= Gustaf Cederström =

Swedish painter

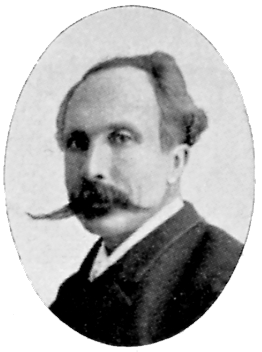
- From the Svenskt Porträttgalleri XX
- Born: 12 April 1845; Stockholm
- Died: 20 August 1933 (aged 88); Stockholm

Signature
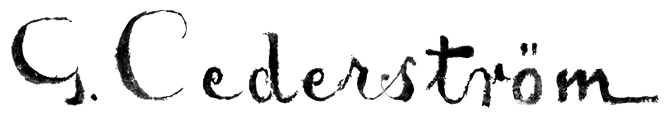

Gustaf Olof Cederström (1845-1933) was a Swedish painter who specialized in historical scenes and portraits.

== Biography ==
His father, Carl Emanuel Cederström (1804-1892) was a naval officer and his mother, Theresine (1815-1873), was an amateur painter. His interest in history began when he was still very young and he discovered that one of his ancestors had participated in the Skirmish at Bender.

At first, he planned to follow in his father's footsteps and pursue a military career. In 1864, he was assigned to an infantry regiment in Värmland as an underlöjtnant but, whenever possible, he also took art classes at the Royal Swedish Academy of Fine Arts. In 1870, he decided to resign his commission and become an artist. Later, he studied with Ferdinand Fagerlin in Düsseldorf and Léon Bonnat in Paris, where he chose to settle in 1873.

His first success came at the Exposition Universelle (1878), where he displayed a somewhat romanticized scene featuring the body of the late Swedish King, Karl XII, being carried home. It brought him a medal and it was purchased by the Russian Grand Duke Konstantin, but was returned to Sweden after the Russian Revolution and is now on display at the Göteborgs konstmuseum. Later that same year, he was elected a member of the Royal Academy and married Amalia Katarina Jaeder. Their daughter, Carola (1878-1954), also became a painter.

He was named a Professor at the Academy in 1887, and served as its Director from 1899 to 1911. In 1894, he became involved in a project to paint historical scenes for the stairwell of the Nationalmuseum, but a conflict over subject matter arose with Carl Larsson, the other artist proposed for the project, and he eventually refused the assignment. In 1906, he did create scenes for the Royal Dramatic Theatre.

He was also an author. His best known works are an autobiography, En gammal konstnärs minnen (An Old Artist's Memories, 1926) and Gammalt och nytt (Old and New, 1929).

== Selected paintings ==
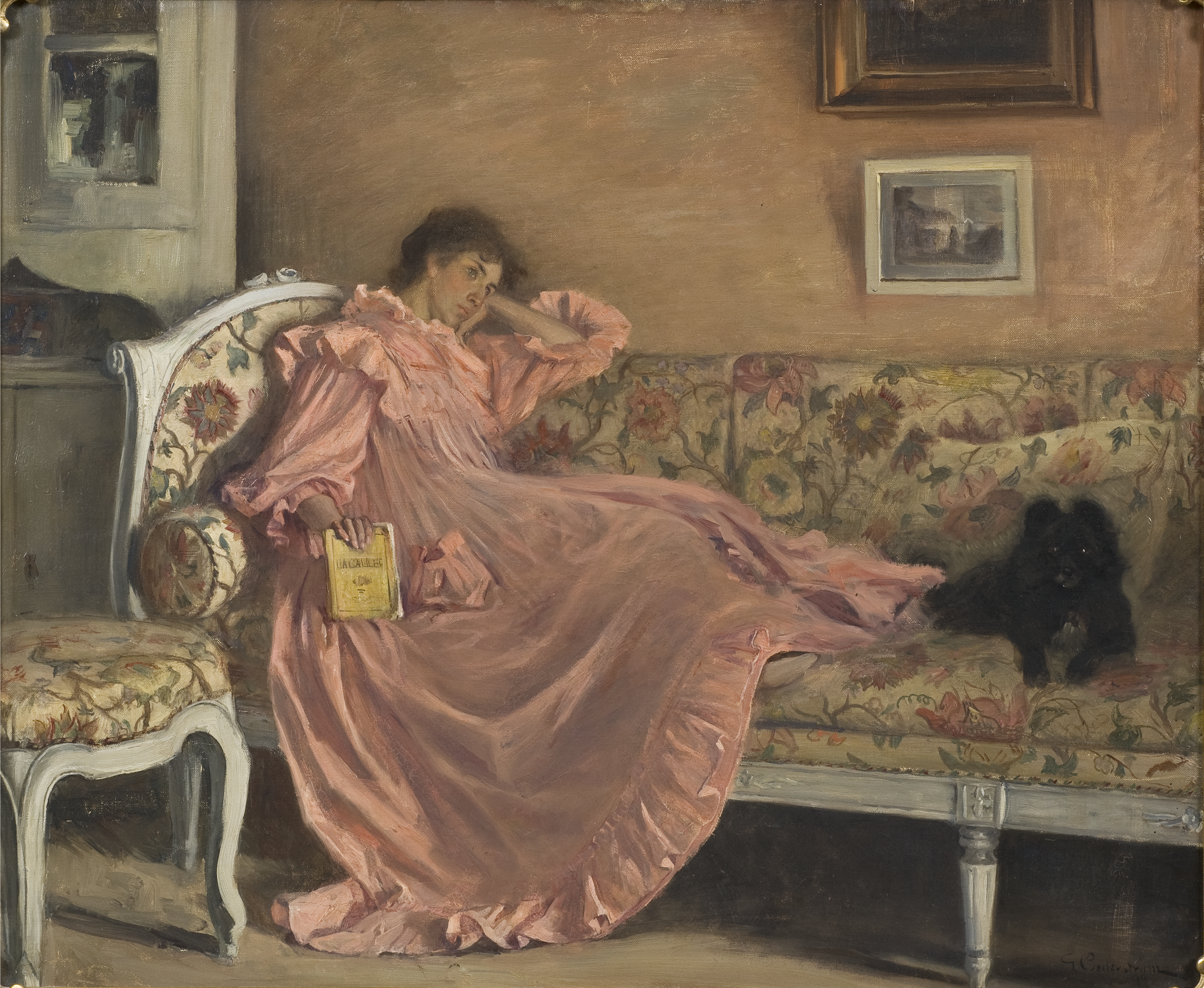
Carola Sitting on the Sofa

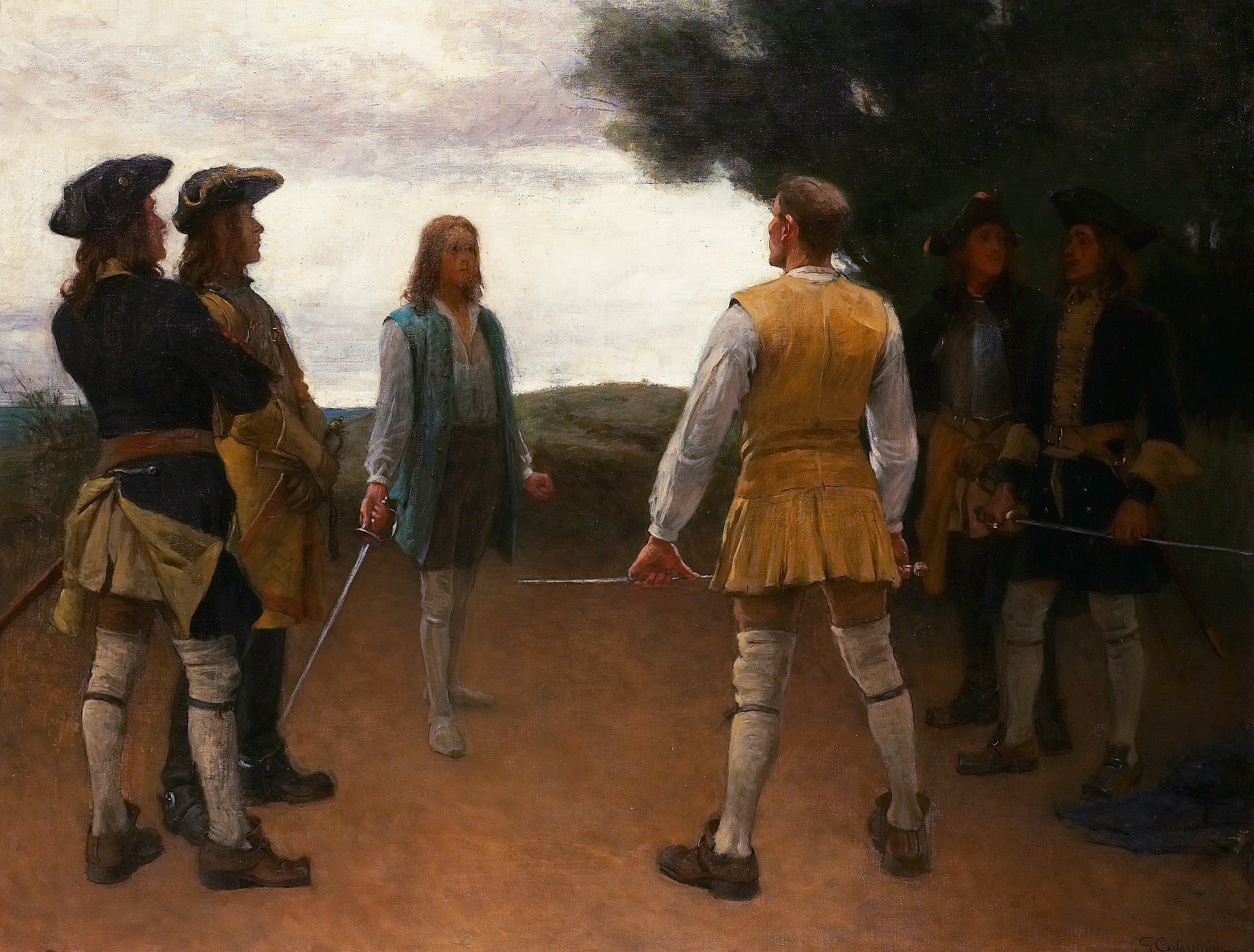
David and Goliath

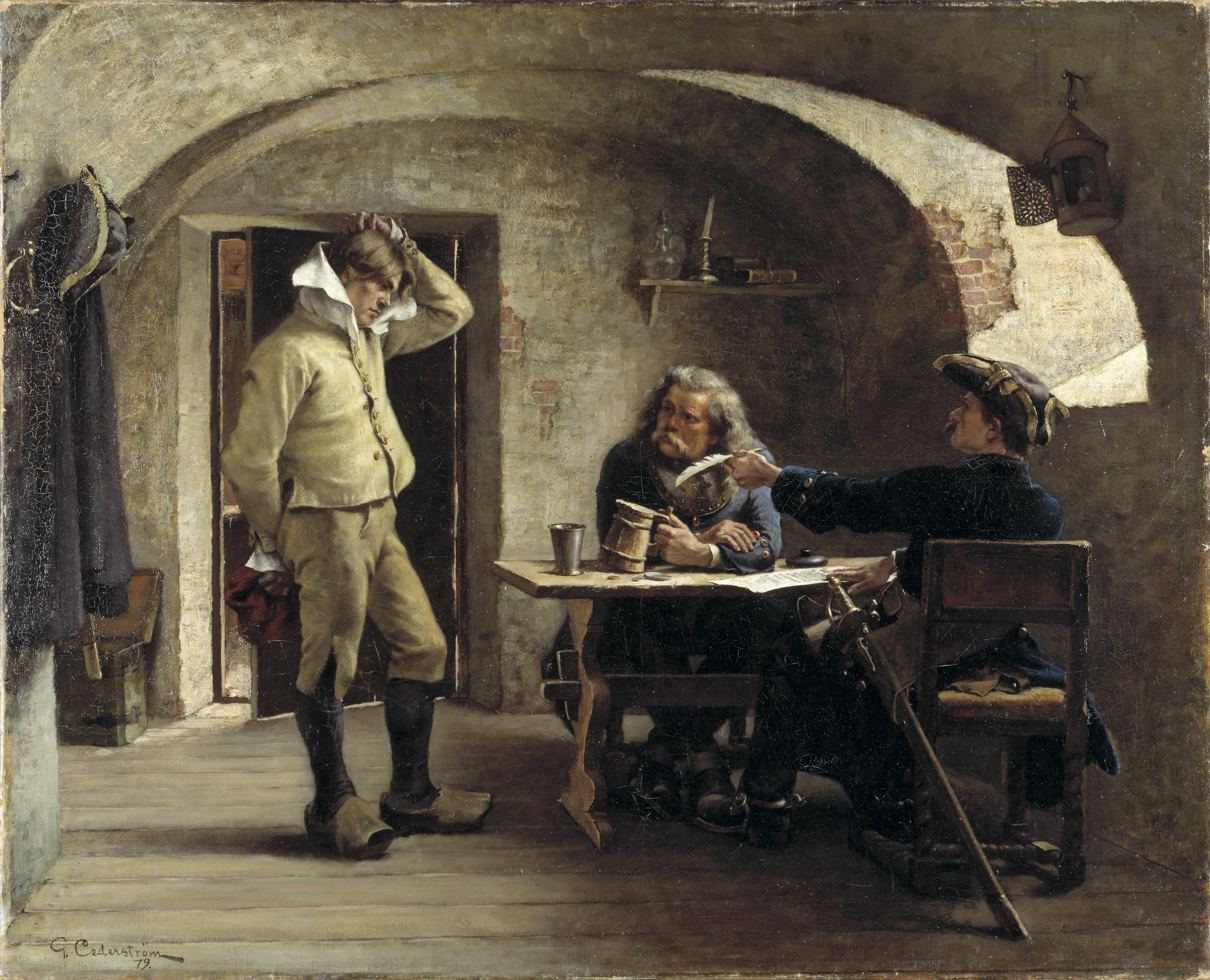
Recruiting Sergeants

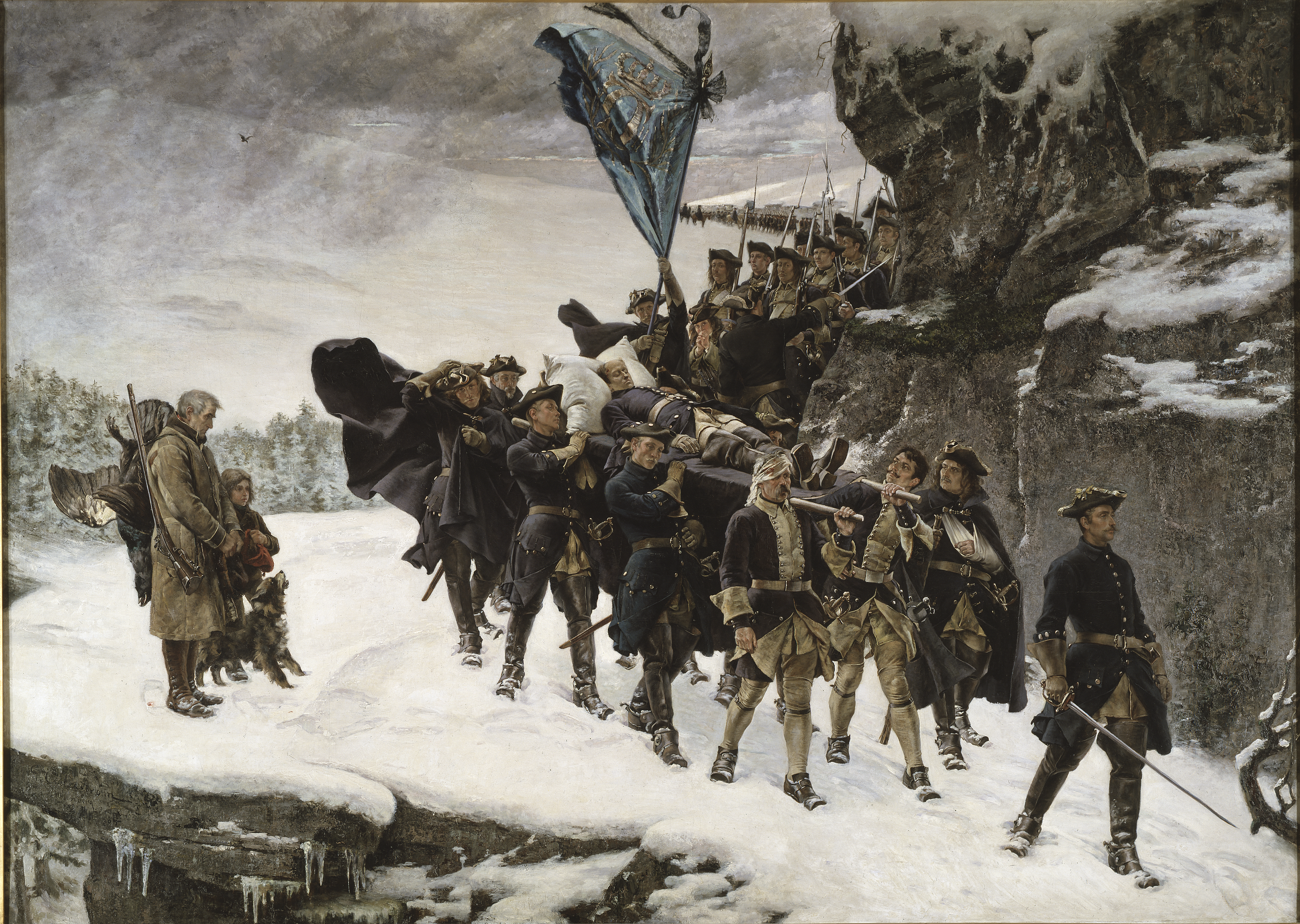
Bringing Home the Body of King Charles XII

== Other sources ==
- Svenskt konstnärslexikon Part I pgs.297-300 Allhems Förlag, Malmö
