= General Industrial Exposition of Stockholm (1866) =

Exposition in Sweden

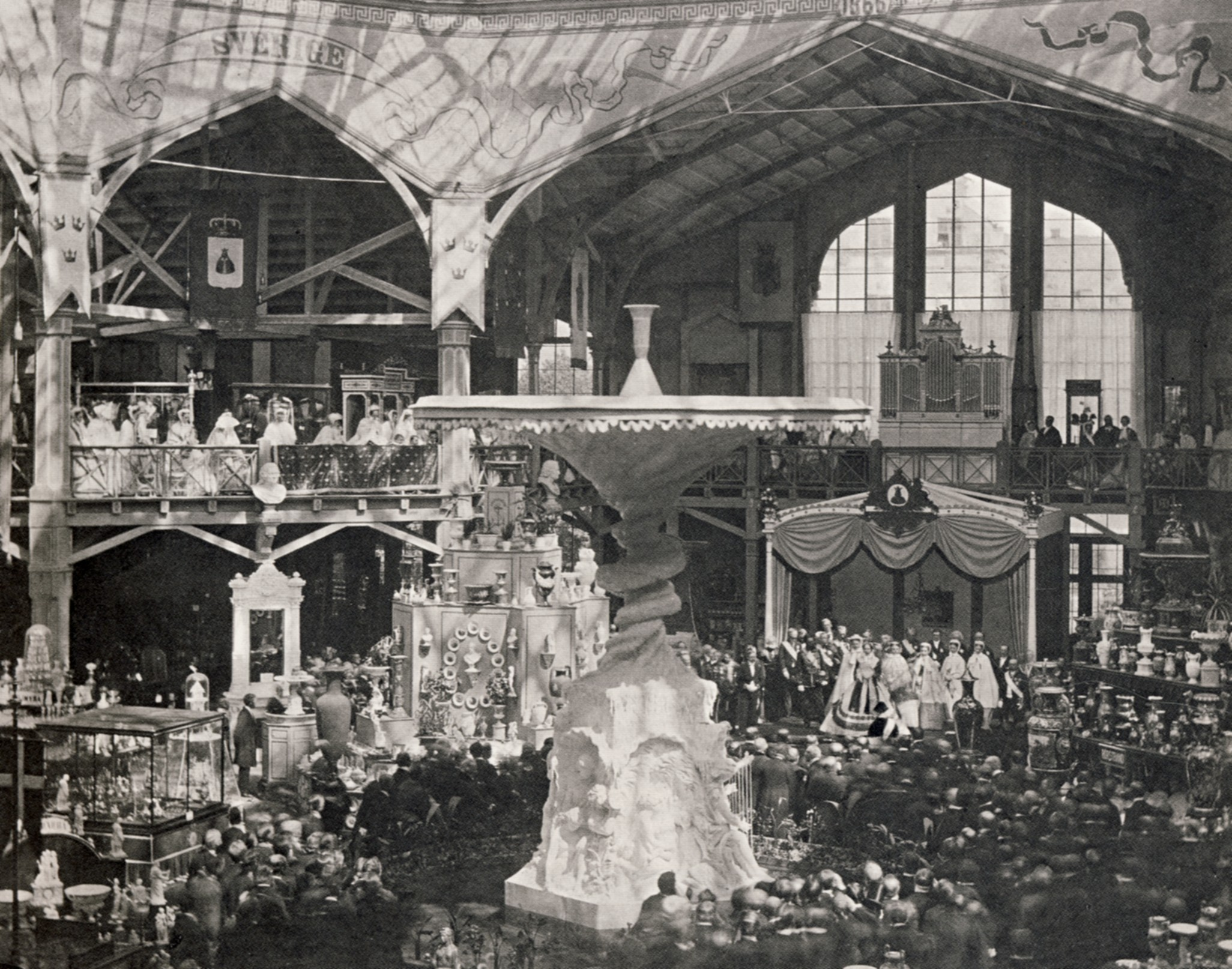
interior showing Molin's fountain

The General Industrial Exposition of Stockholm (1866) (Swedish: 1866 års allmänna industriutställning i Stockholm) or only the Stockholm Exposition of 1866 (Swedish: Stockholmsutställningen 1866) was an international aviation exhibition held in the Swedish capital of Stockholm. It was the first international Art- and Industrial Exposition held after a European pattern in Sweden. Circa 3.800 people from Sweden, Denmark, Norway and Finland participated. The exposition took place in the Industrial Hall at Kungsträdgården and at the Nationalmuseum on Blasieholmen in Stockholm between the 15 June and the 14 October 1866.
