= Nationalmuseum =

National art gallery of Sweden

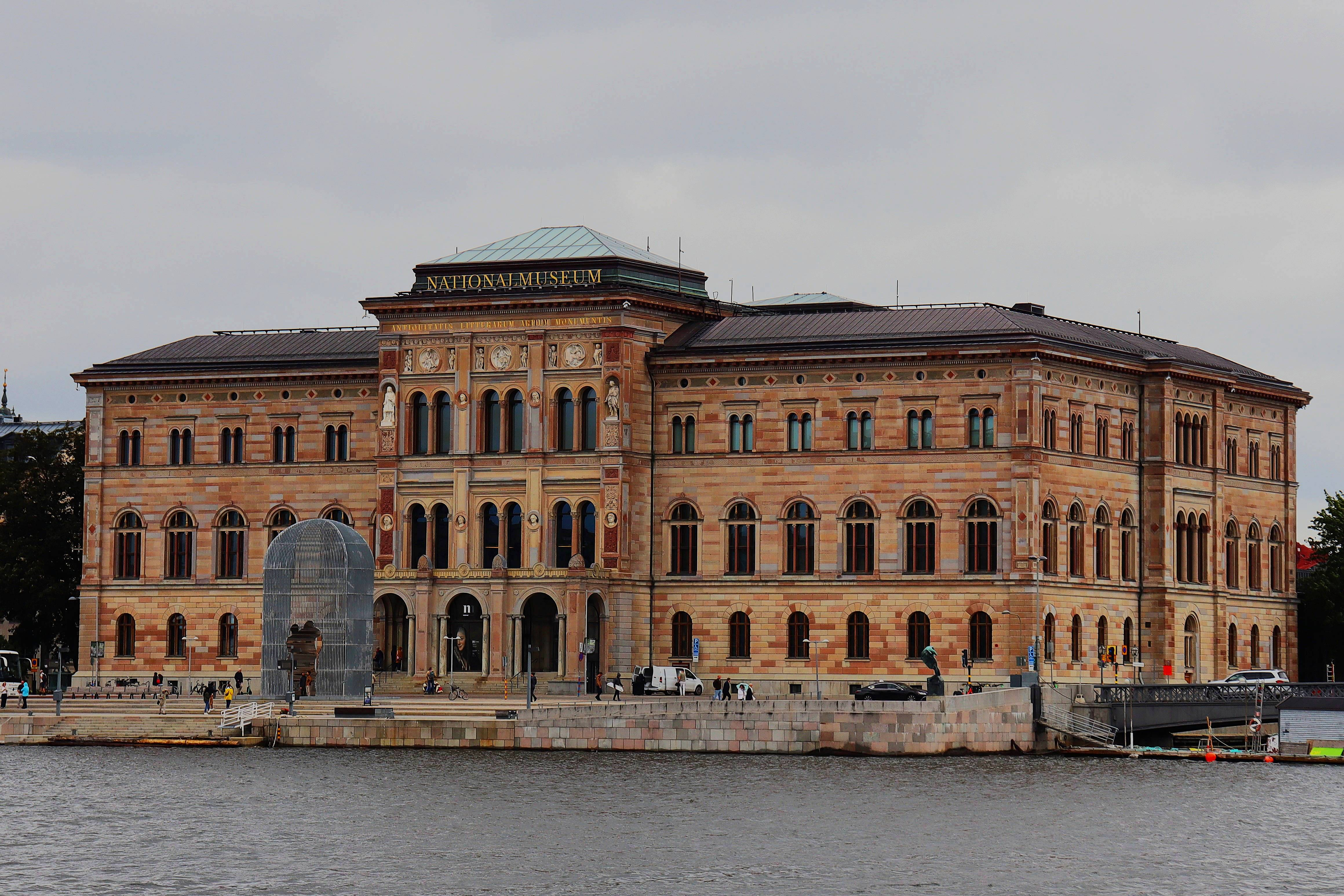
- Nationalmuseum in 2025
- Interactive fullscreen map
- Established: 1792/1866
- Coordinates: 59°19′43″N 18°04′41″E
- Type: National gallery
- Visitors: 122 133 (2017)
- Directors: Patrick Amsellem, Director General, 1 January 2024–
- Website: nationalmuseum.se/en

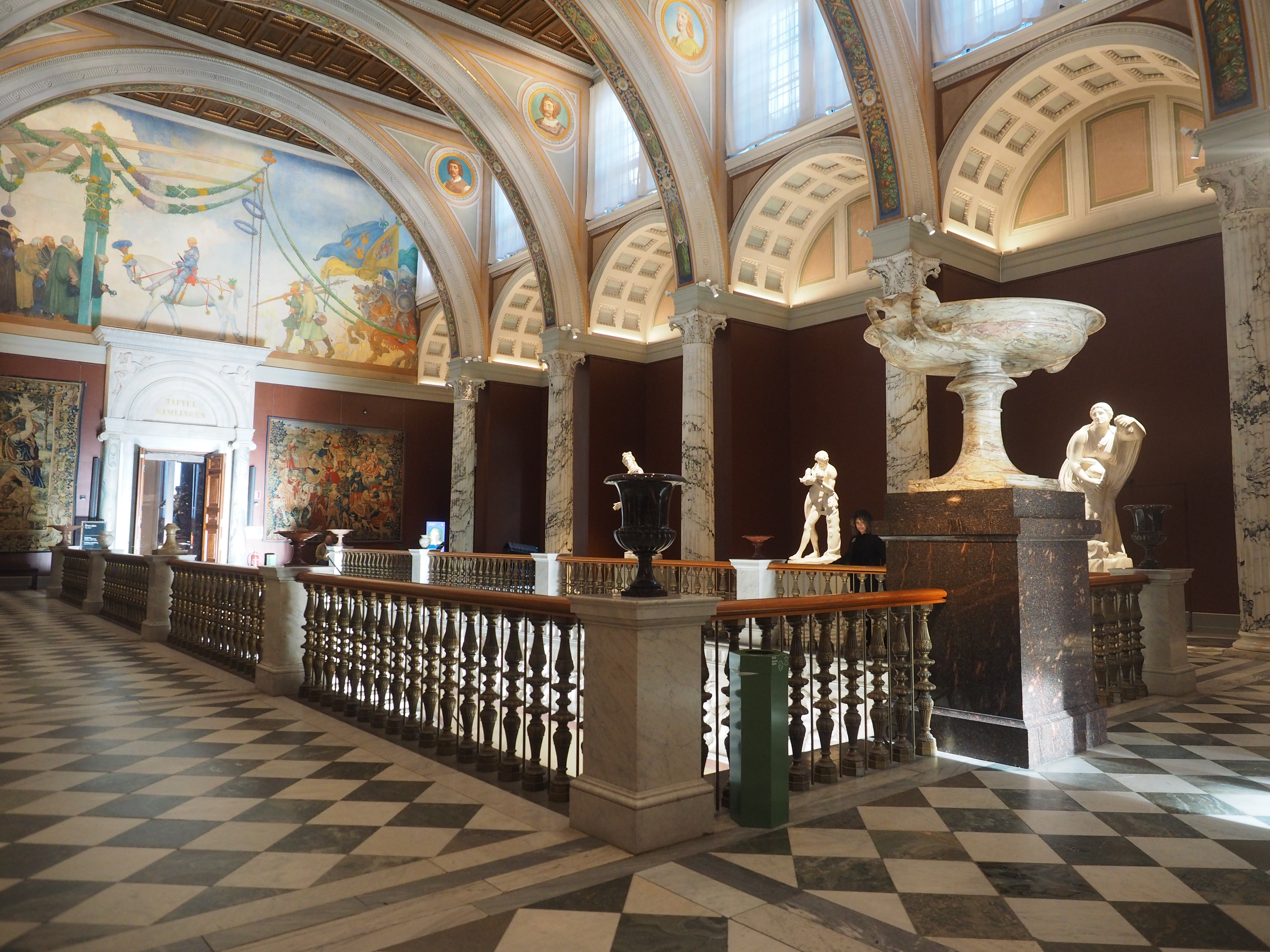
A view of a corridor at the Nationalmuseum

Nationalmuseum is the national gallery of fine arts of Sweden, located on the peninsula Blasieholmen in central Stockholm.

The museum's operations stretch far beyond the borders of Blasieholmen, including the National Portrait Gallery collection at Gripshom, the Gustavsberg porcelain museum, several castle collections and the Swedish Institute in Paris (Institut Tessin). In the summer of 2018, Nationalmuseum Jamtli opened in Östersund to exhibit parts of the collection in the north of Sweden.

The museum's benefactors include King Gustav III and Carl Gustaf Tessin. It was founded in 1792 as Kungliga Museet (Royal Museum). The present building was opened in 1866, when it was renamed the Nationalmuseum, and was among the buildings that hosted the 1866 General Industrial Exposition of Stockholm.

The current building, built between 1844 and 1866, was inspired by northern Italian Renaissance architecture. It is the design of the German architect Friedrich August Stüler, who also designed the Neues Museum in Berlin. Despite its relatively closed exterior, the building has a spacious interior dominated by a large flight of stairs leading to the topmost galleries.

The museum was expanded in 1961 for workshops, and its current restaurant opened in 1996. It closed for renovation in 2013 and reopened on 13 October 2018 after upgrades to its galleries, accessibility, fire safety, security and climate control.

== History ==
=== The museum's early history ===
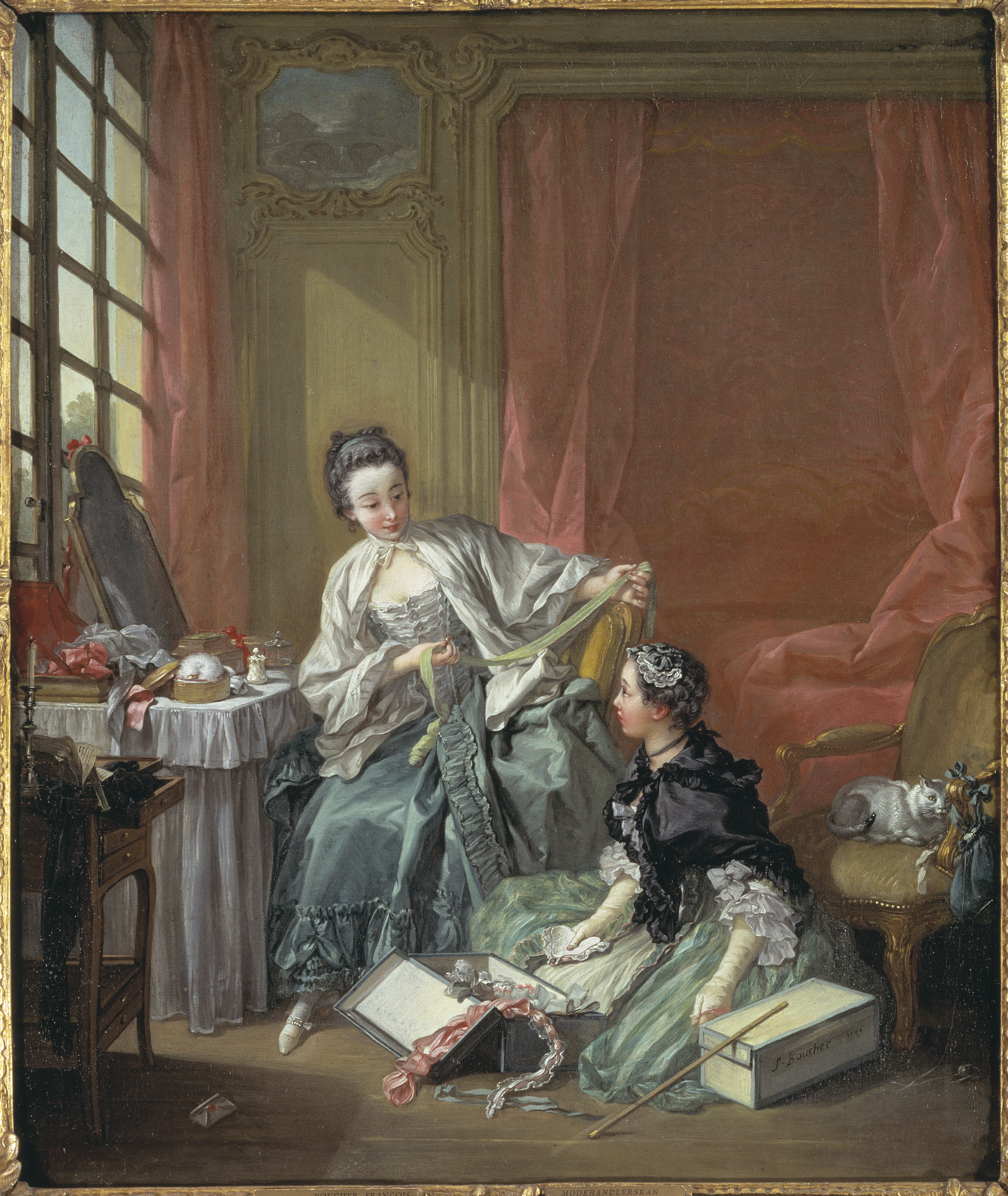
The Milliner, François Boucher, commissioned by Carl Gustaf Tessin for Louisa Ulrika

As with several other European national galleries, the history of the Nationalmuseum involves a transition in ownership from royalty to the state, and by extension publicly available collections. In Sweden, the foundation was laid for today's state art collections in the 18th century. Several of the works included in the Nationalmuseum collection, such as its 18th-century French paintings, were once owned by Queen Lovisa Ulrika. In 1777, the queen's financial situation became unsustainable, partly the result of her ambitious and expensive pursuit of art. The debts were settled by her son King Gustav III when she agreed to surrender her collections and Drottningholm Palace.

For some time, King Gustav III stored the art collections in one of the wings at the Royal Palace, which later resulted in a need for a building dedicated to the collection.

=== Construction of a museum building ===
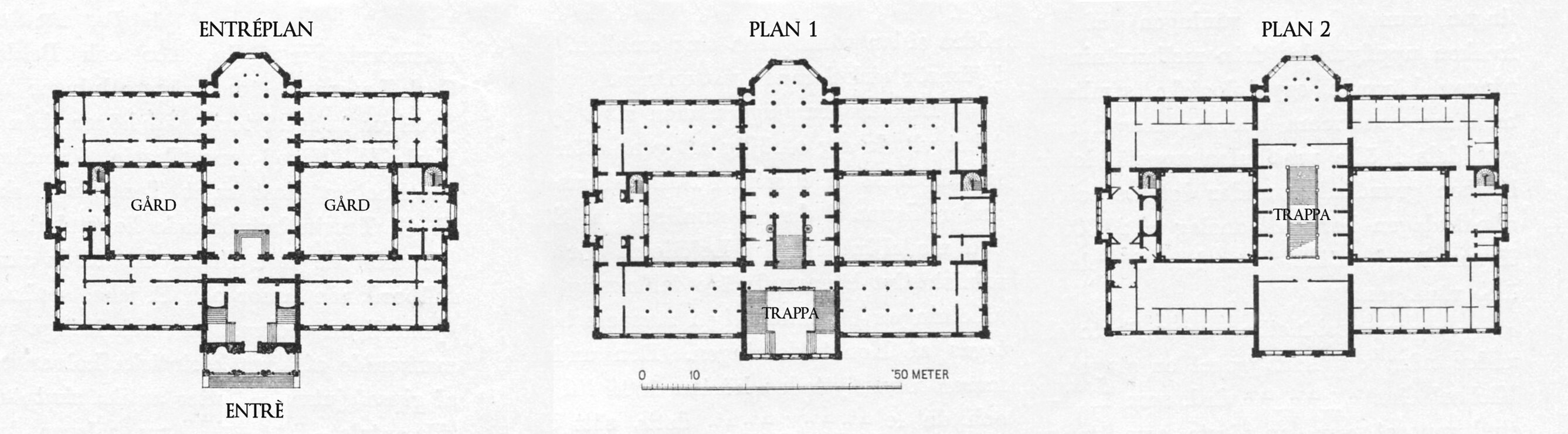
Floor plans for the Nationalmuseum

The project to construct a royal museum in Stockholm was one of the largest and most lavish construction works of all time, taking 12 years to complete with another three years for the interior work. The German architect Friedrich August Stüler was responsible for the design of the building and the Swedish architect Fredrik Wilhelm Scholander was responsible for the interior design. Originally, the building was intended to function as a cultural center, housing a library, auditorium, the Royal Armoury, and wardrobe collections, while only the top floor would display sculptures and paintings. In the end, however, the building primarily became a venue for the exhibition of visual art. Nationalmuseum was inaugurated in 1866 in conjunction with the General Industrial Exposition of Stockholm.

The building consisted of three floors with a façade cladding in Swedish limestone. Perhaps the most impressive feature at the time was the large glass sections, which had been manufactured in a German factory. In the early years, the exhibition halls of Nationalmuseum were not heated; visitors simply had to keep their outerwear on. Until 1915, the museum lacked toilets, and electricity was not installed until 1931.

=== 2010s renovation ===
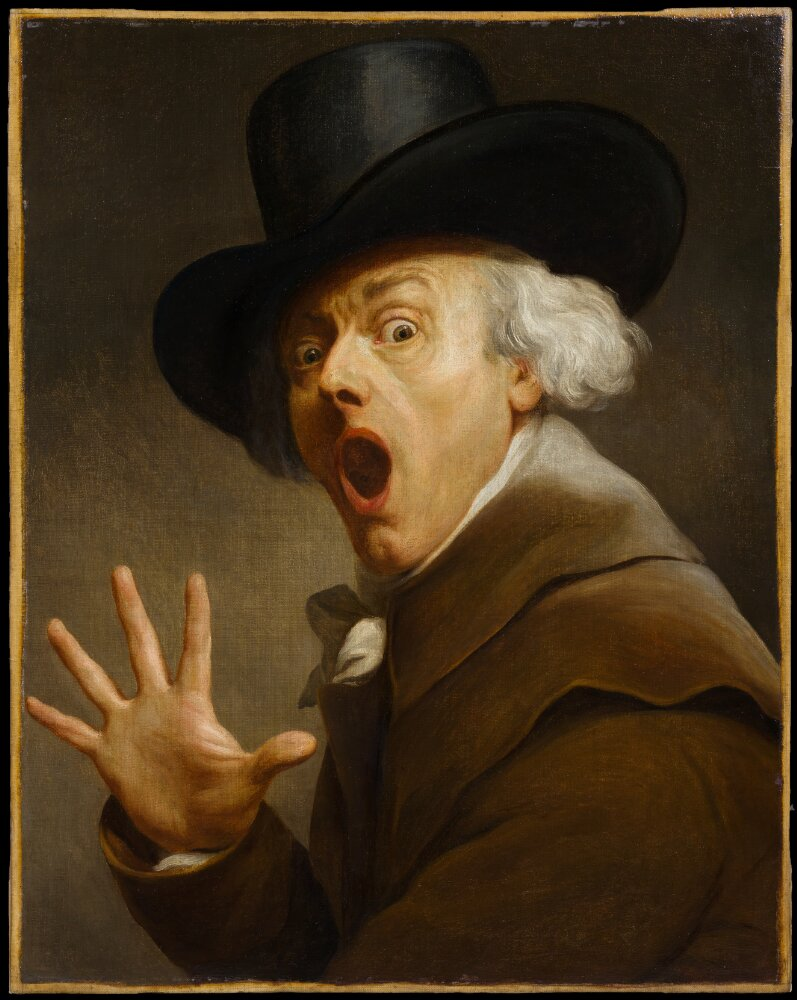
Joseph Ducreux, La surprise, a self-portrait

In 2009, the National Property Board of Sweden was commissioned to study a renovation of the Nationalmuseum building, and a building programme was presented to the government in 2011. Planning began in 2012, and the museum started evacuating the building in February 2013. On 20 February 2014, the government commissioned the National Property Board to renovate and convert the building into a modern museum facility. During the closure, Nationalmuseum continued to show parts of its collection at other venues in Sweden and abroad.

The renovation addressed outdated climate control, safety, ventilation and energy systems.The building had become unsuitable for the long-term display of art, and some windows had been sealed to protect paintings from sunlight. The project also involved repairs to damaged limestone, improved insulation, and changes to meet current safety requirements.

The renovation introduced two main architectural additions: an elevator tower in the southern atrium and a service building behind the museum. The work was designed to preserve the historic character of the building while improving access, circulation and museum infrastructure.

The museum was reinaugurated on 13 October 2018 by King Carl XVI Gustaf, in the presence of members of the royal family, minister of culture Alice Bah Kuhnke and over a thousand visitors. After the renovation, exhibition space increased, the museum could display almost three times as many works, and restored windows and ceiling lanterns brought daylight and city views back into the galleries. The restaurant was moved, a sculpture courtyard was created, and the interiors regained a colour scheme inspired by the building's original palette.

== Legal framework ==
Nationalmuseum is located in central Stockholm, which is classified as a national interest for cultural heritage conservation (swe. riksintresse för kulturmiljövården) under Ordinance (1998:808). The justification for including central Stockholm in this law is about the city's function as an administrative and political center since the Middle Ages, with all eras since then up until today represented in the architecture, as well as the strategic geographical location for trade, communication and defense.

Since 1935, Nationalmuseum has been a State-Owned Listed Building of National Heritage Significance (swe. statligt byggnadsminne) under Ordinance (2013:558). This means that the Swedish National Heritage Board (swe. Riksantikvarieämbetet) determines specific protective regulations for buildings, with the aim of preserving its character and cultural-historical value without distortion. The authority managing the property, in this case the National Property Board of Sweden (swe. Statens Fastighetsverk), is then responsible for adhering to these guidelines.

In parallel, the operations of Nationalmuseum are governed by Ordinance (2007:1175) containing Instructions for Nationalmuseum, which means that the building must accommodate functions such as exhibitions, conservation, and research.

== Collection ==
The museum collection consists of approximately 500,000 drawings from the Middle Ages to 1900, a prominent 17th-century collection of Rembrandt and other Dutch painters and collections of porcelain items, paintings, sculptures and modern art. In total, the collection consists of approximately 700,000 objects. The museum also has an art library that is open to the public and academics.

Nationalmuseum holds the largest collection of portrait miniatures in the world, with more than 5,200 works. The collection features miniatures from many European schools, including works by Nicholas Hilliard, Isaac Oliver and Louis-Marie Autissier. A significant portion of the collection derives from the master collector Carl Dahlgren, while the more exclusive works were donated by Hjalmar Wicander, a cork-factory owner. Wicander also donated funds for additional purchases of miniatures.

== Notable works ==
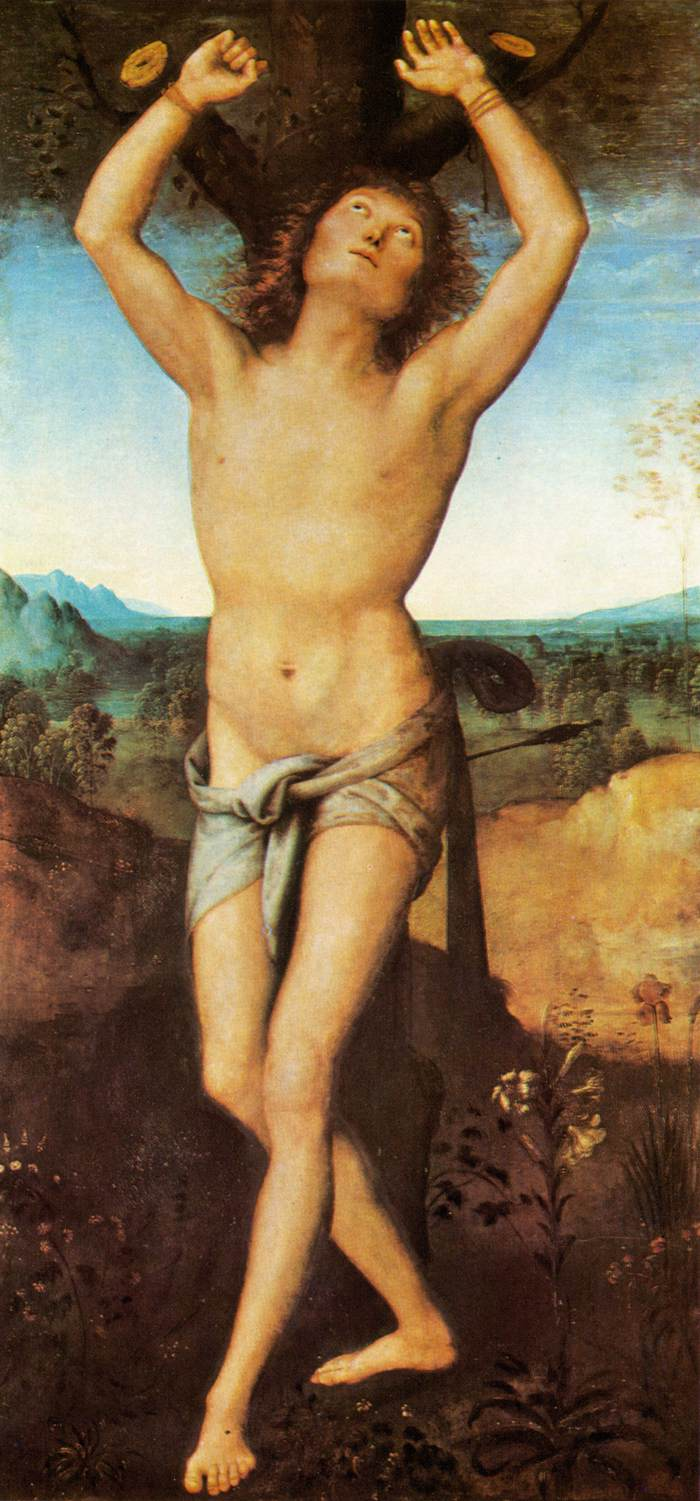
Perugino, St. Sebastian

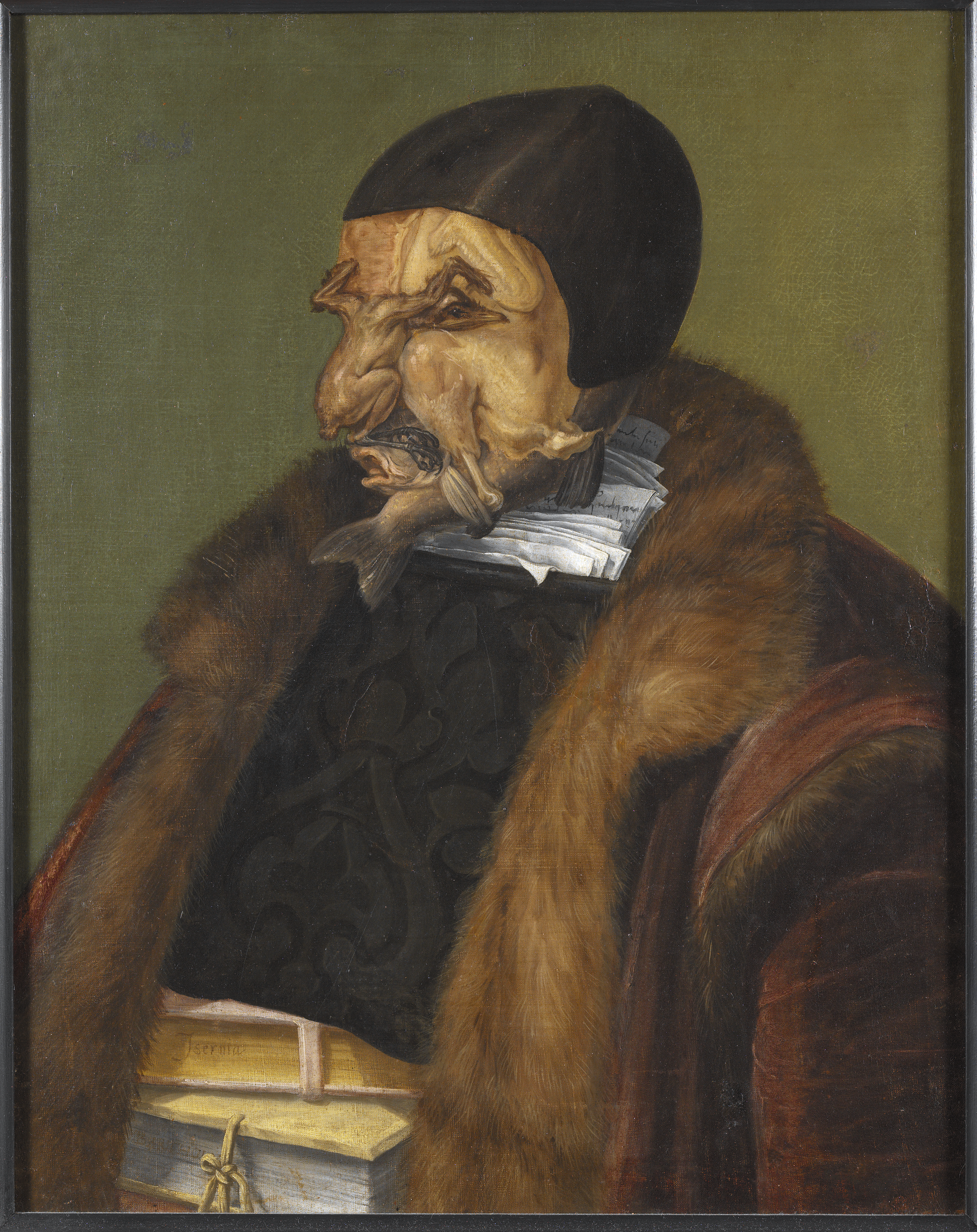
Giuseppe Arcimboldo, The Lawyer, possibly Ulrich Zasius (1461-1536)

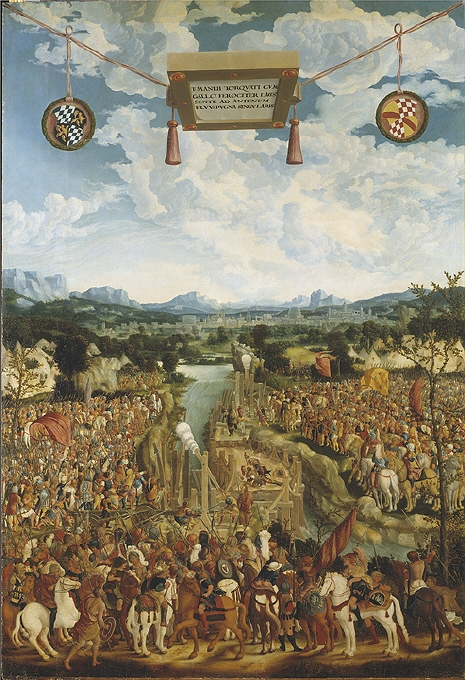
Ludwig Refinger, Manlius Torquatus Fighting a Gaul

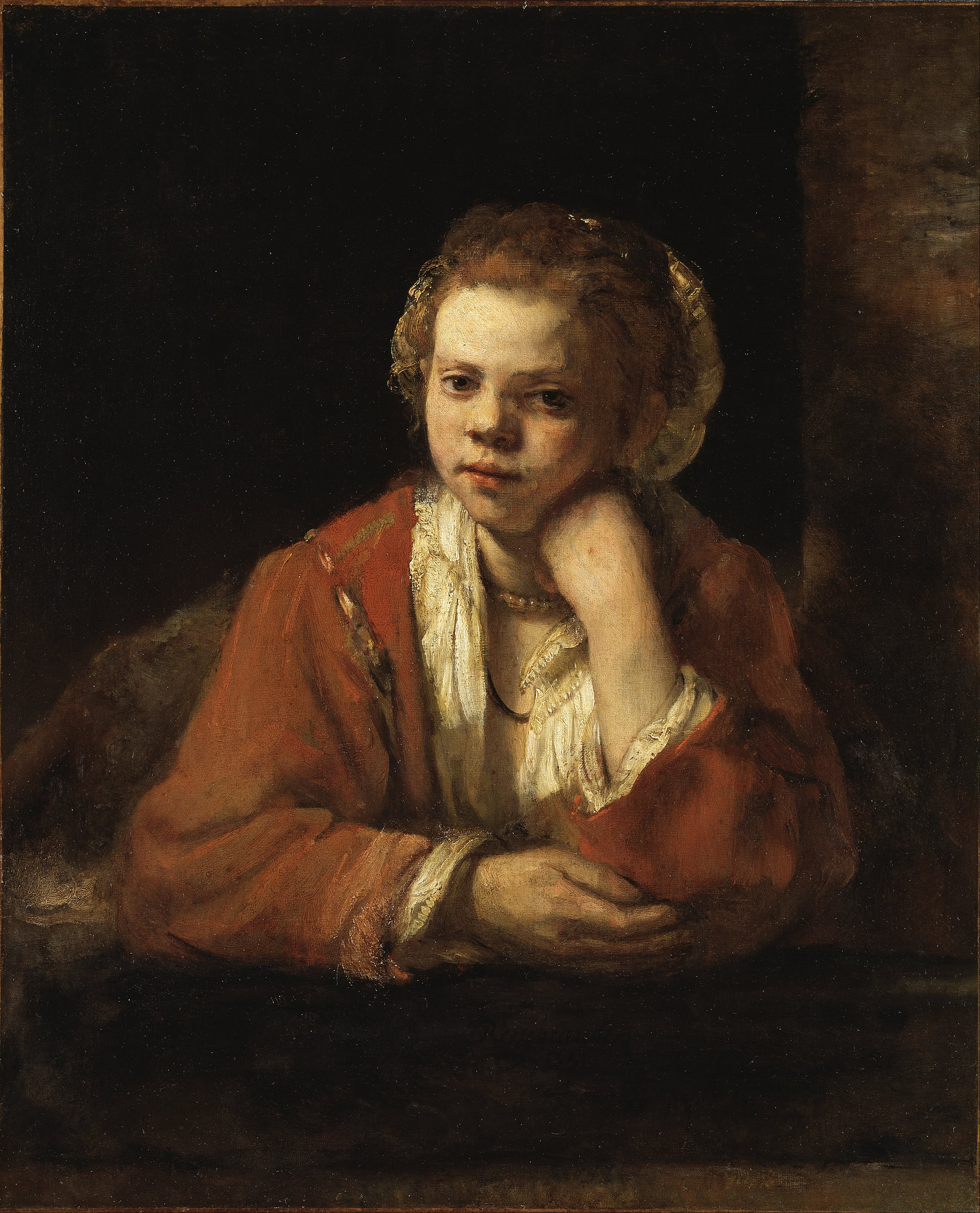
Rembrandt, The Kitchen Maid

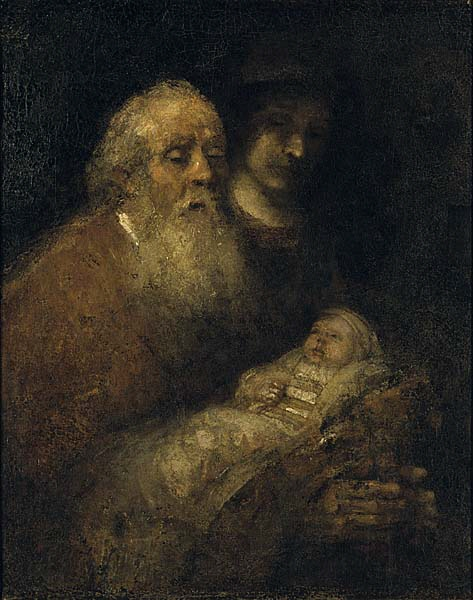
Rembrandt, Simeon's Song of Praise

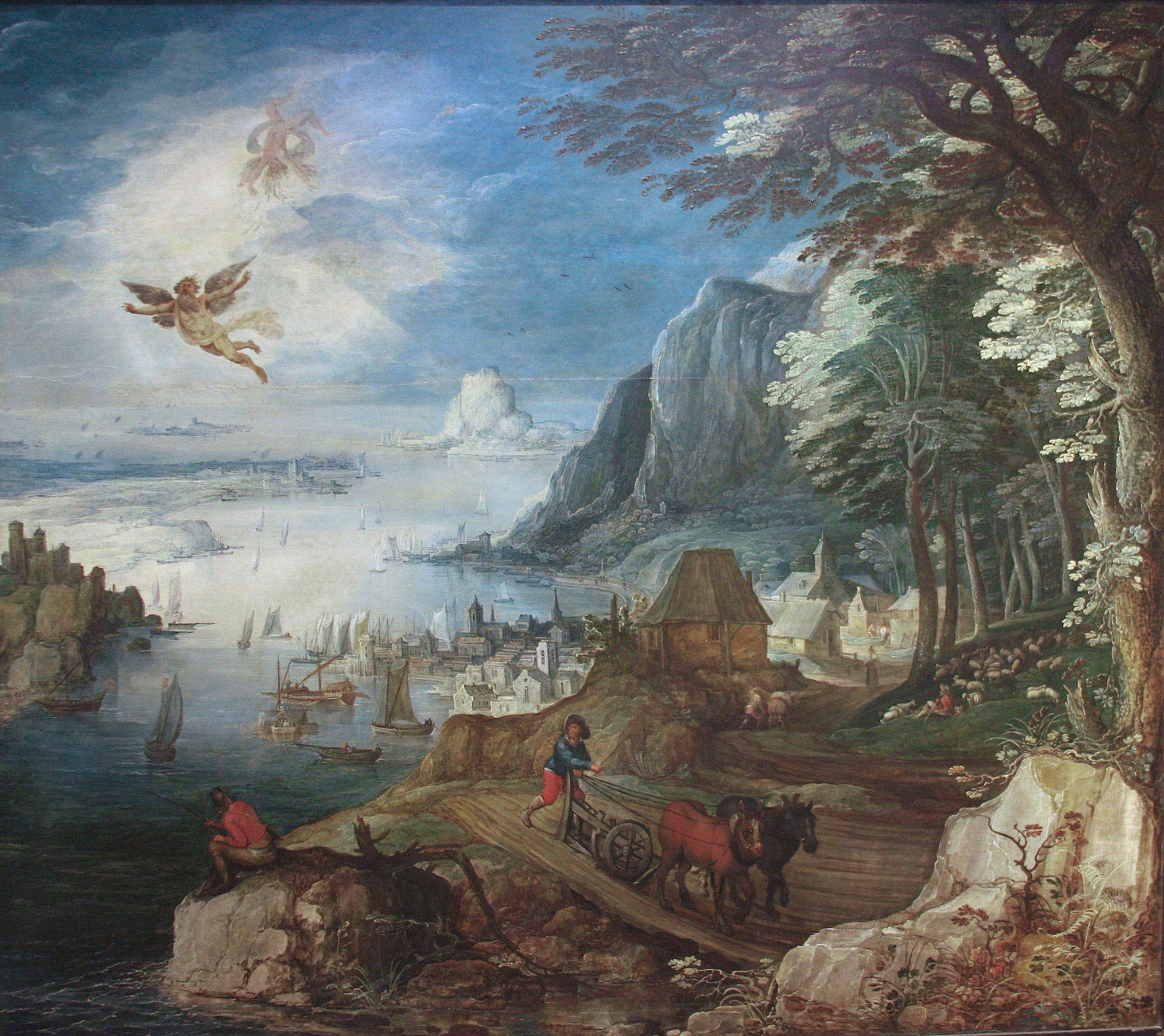
Joos de Momper, Landscape with the Fall of Icarus

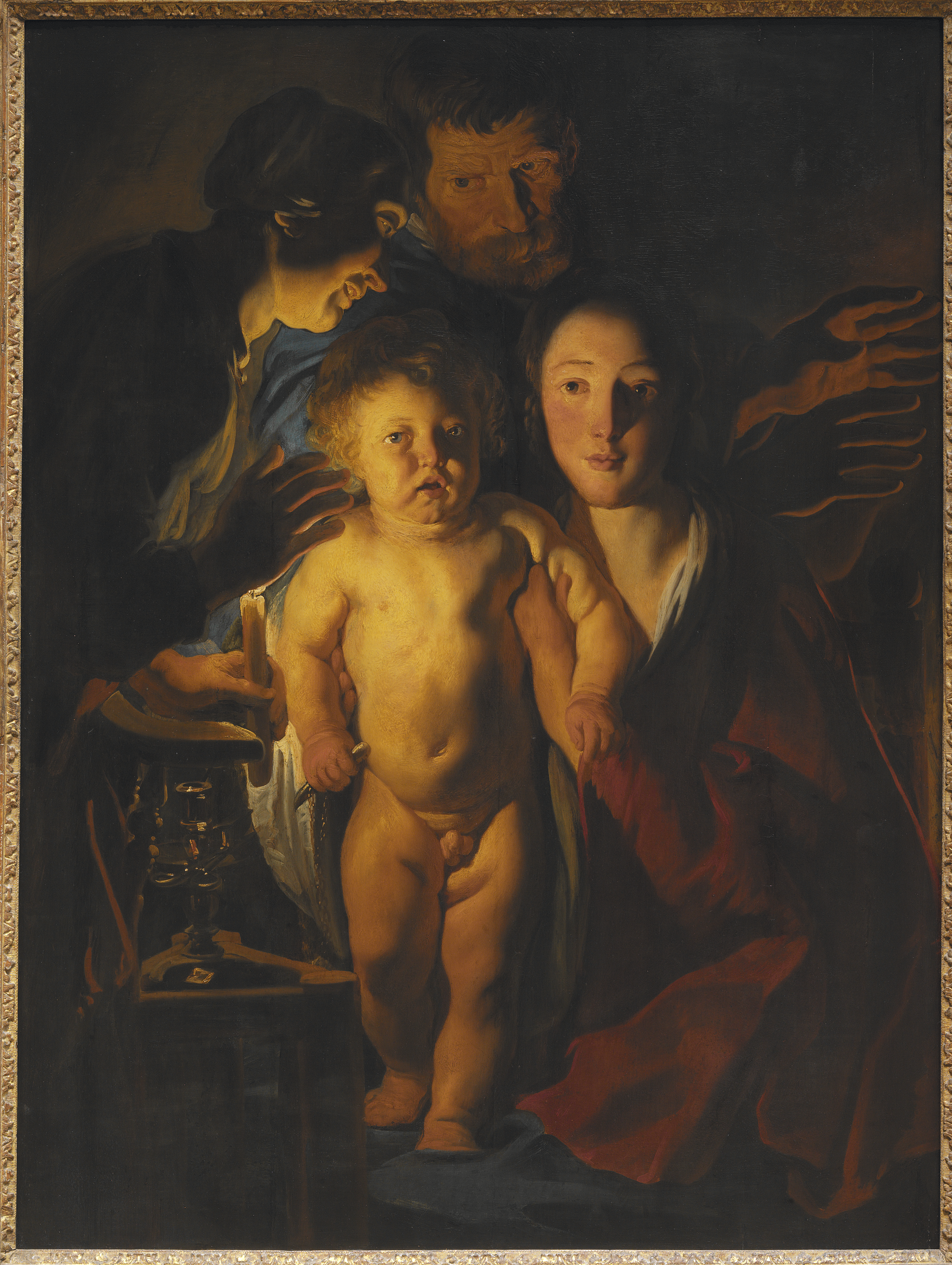
Jacob Jordaens, The Holy Family by Candlelight

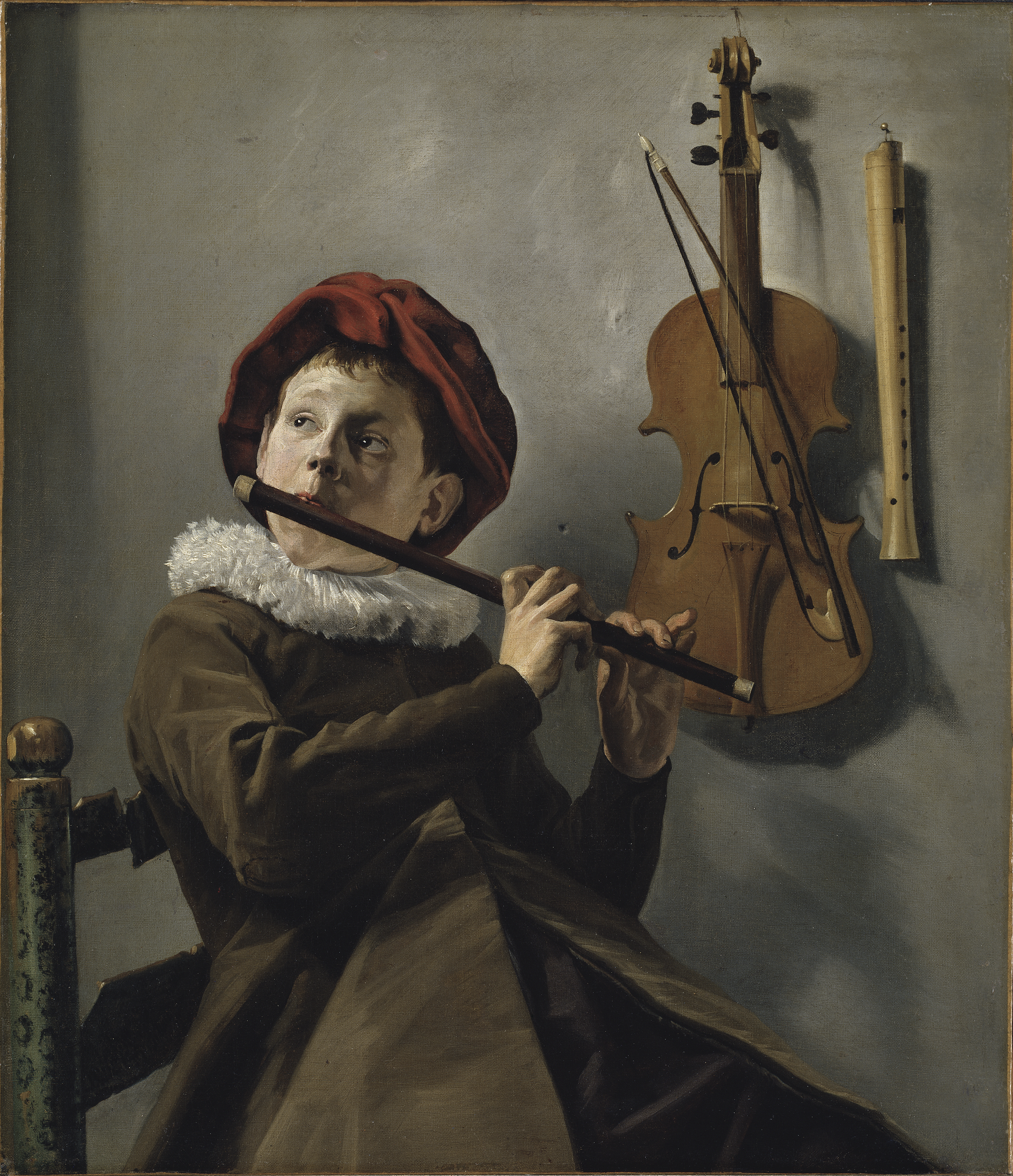
Judith Leyster, Boy Playing the Flute

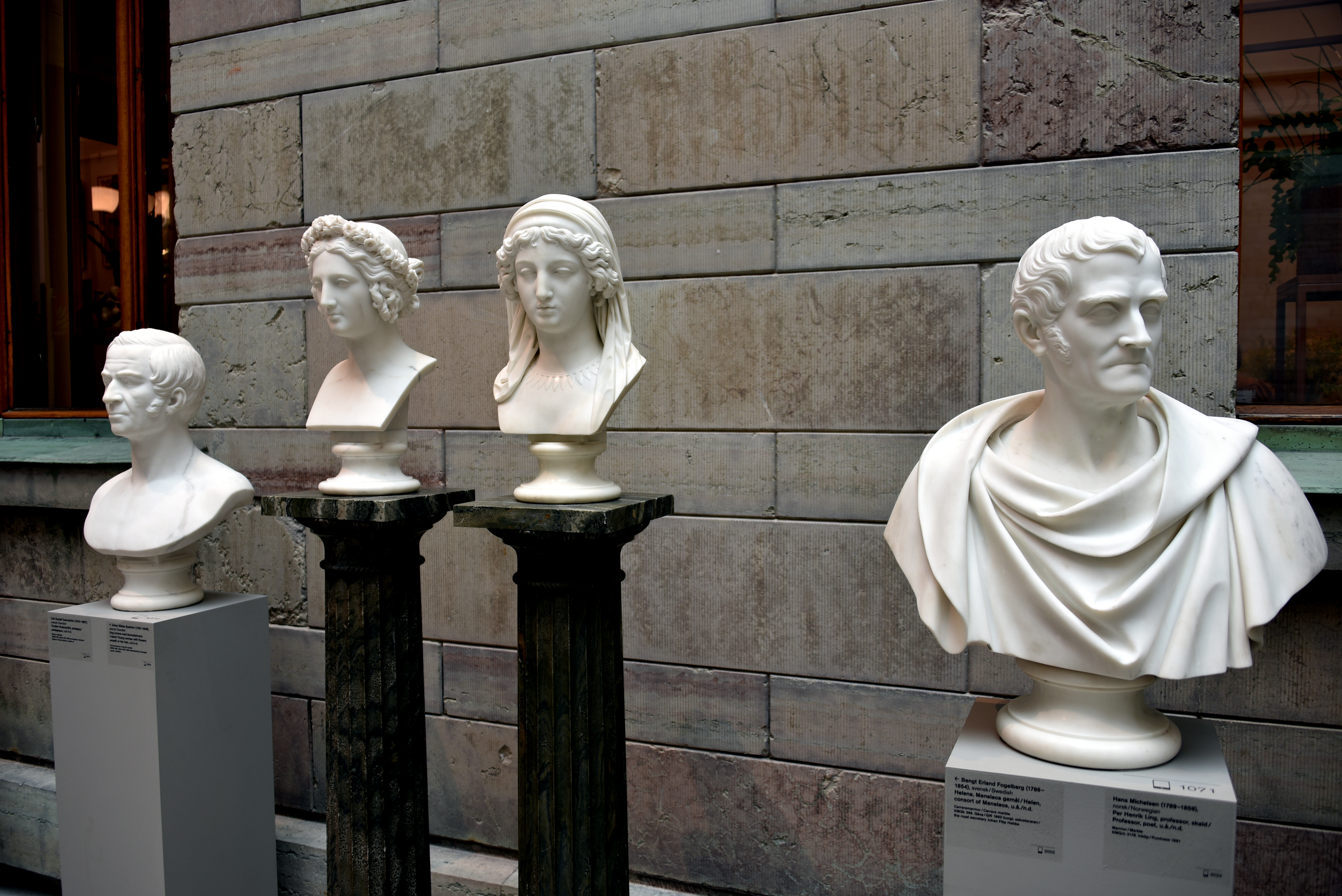
Marble busts in the sculpture courtyard

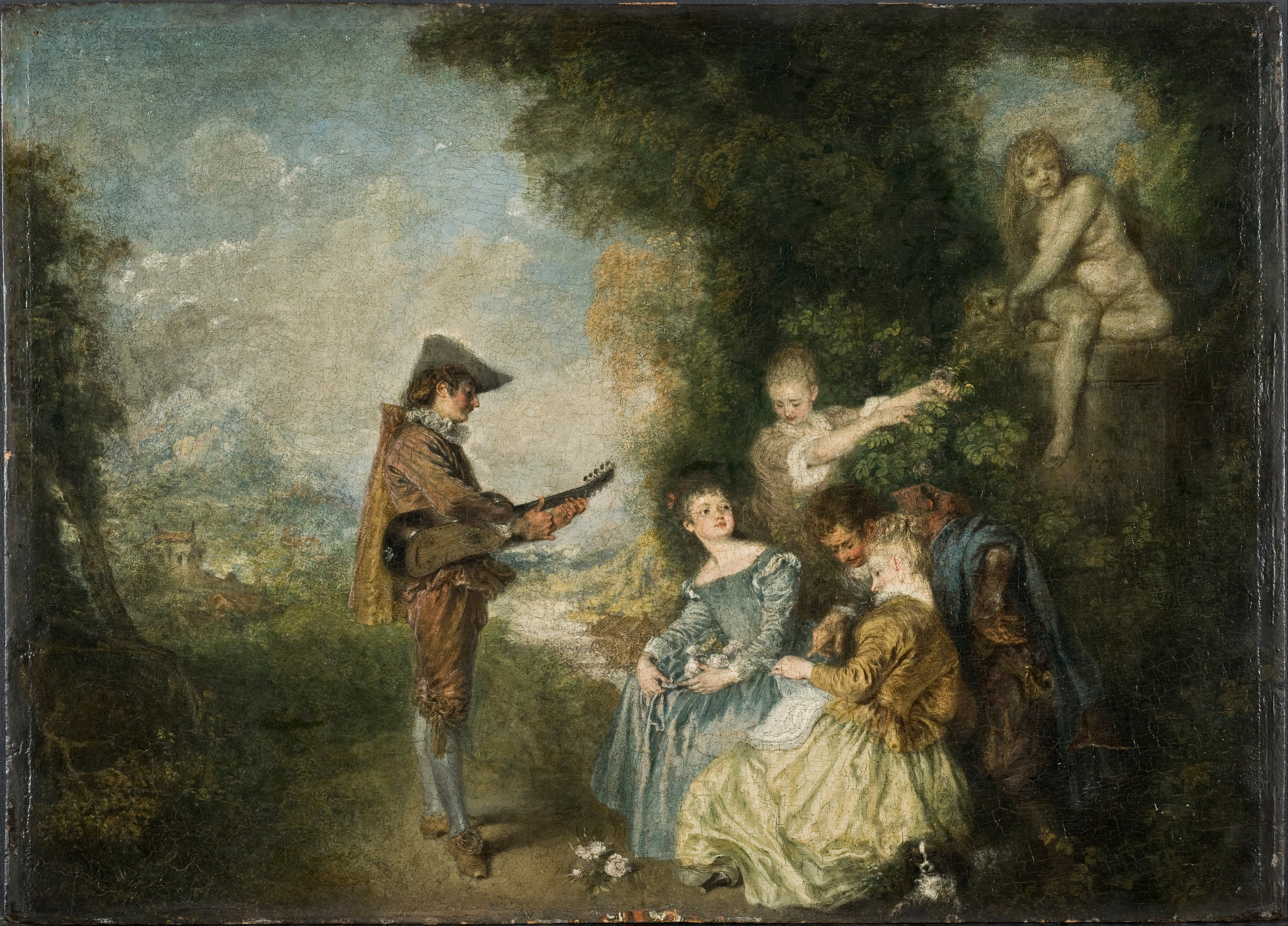
Antoine Watteau, The Love Lesson, c. 1716-1717

Jean Siméon Chardin, Rabbit and Copper Pot

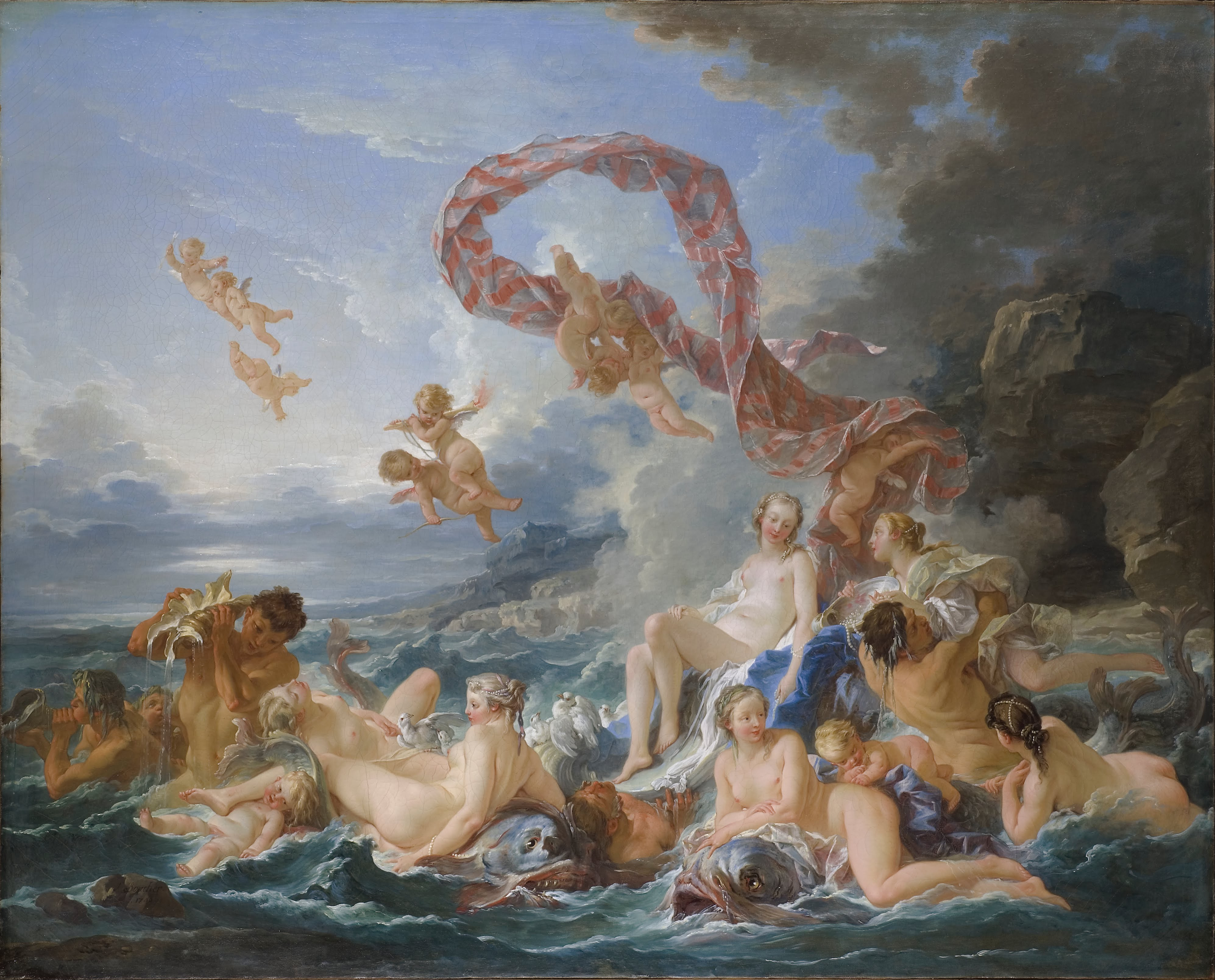
François Boucher, The Triumph of Venus

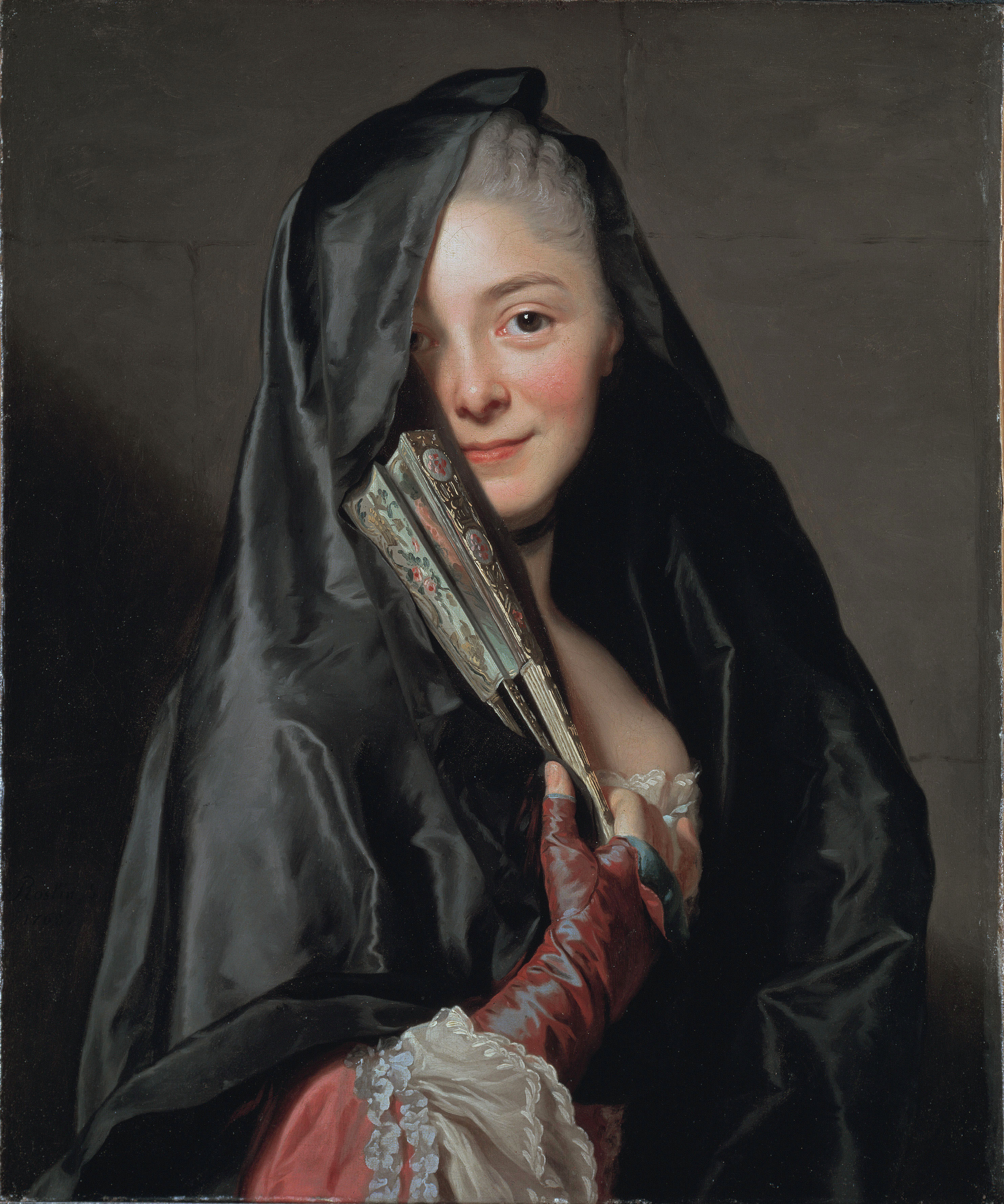
Alexander Roslin, The Lady with the Veil

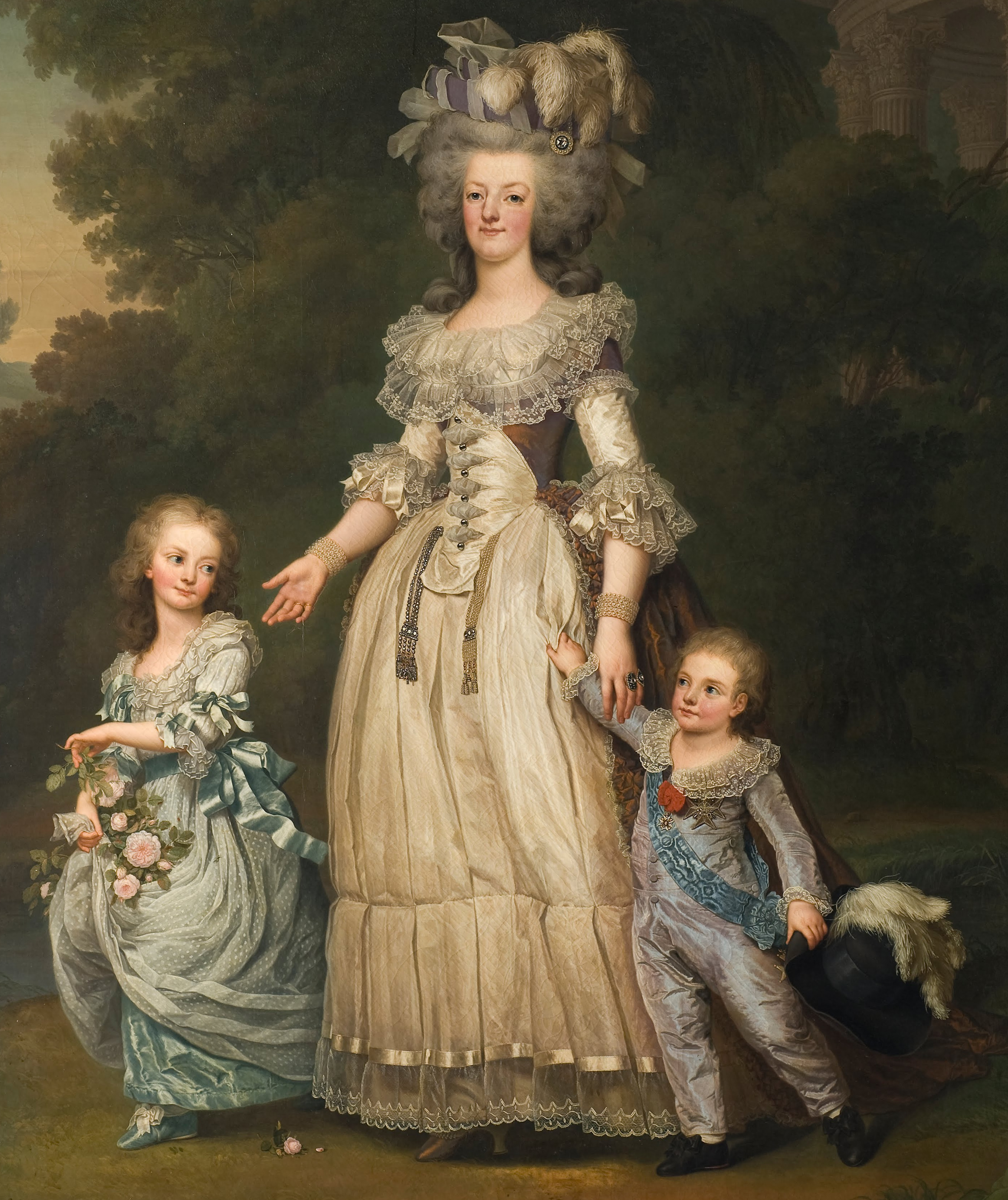
Adolf Ulrik Wertmüller, Queen Marie Antoinette of France and two of her Children Walking in The Park of Trianon, 1785

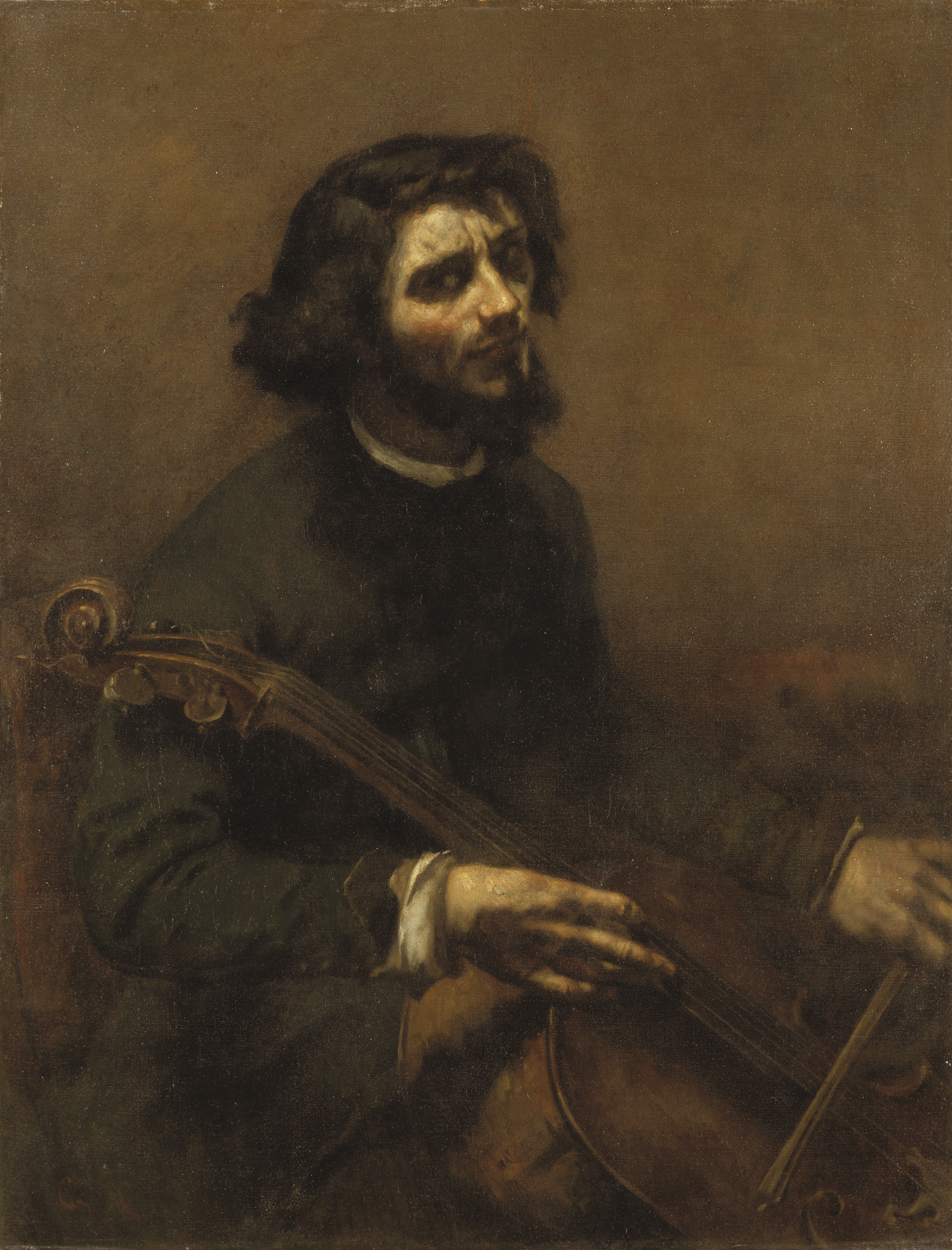
Gustave Courbet,The Cellist (Self-portrait), 1847

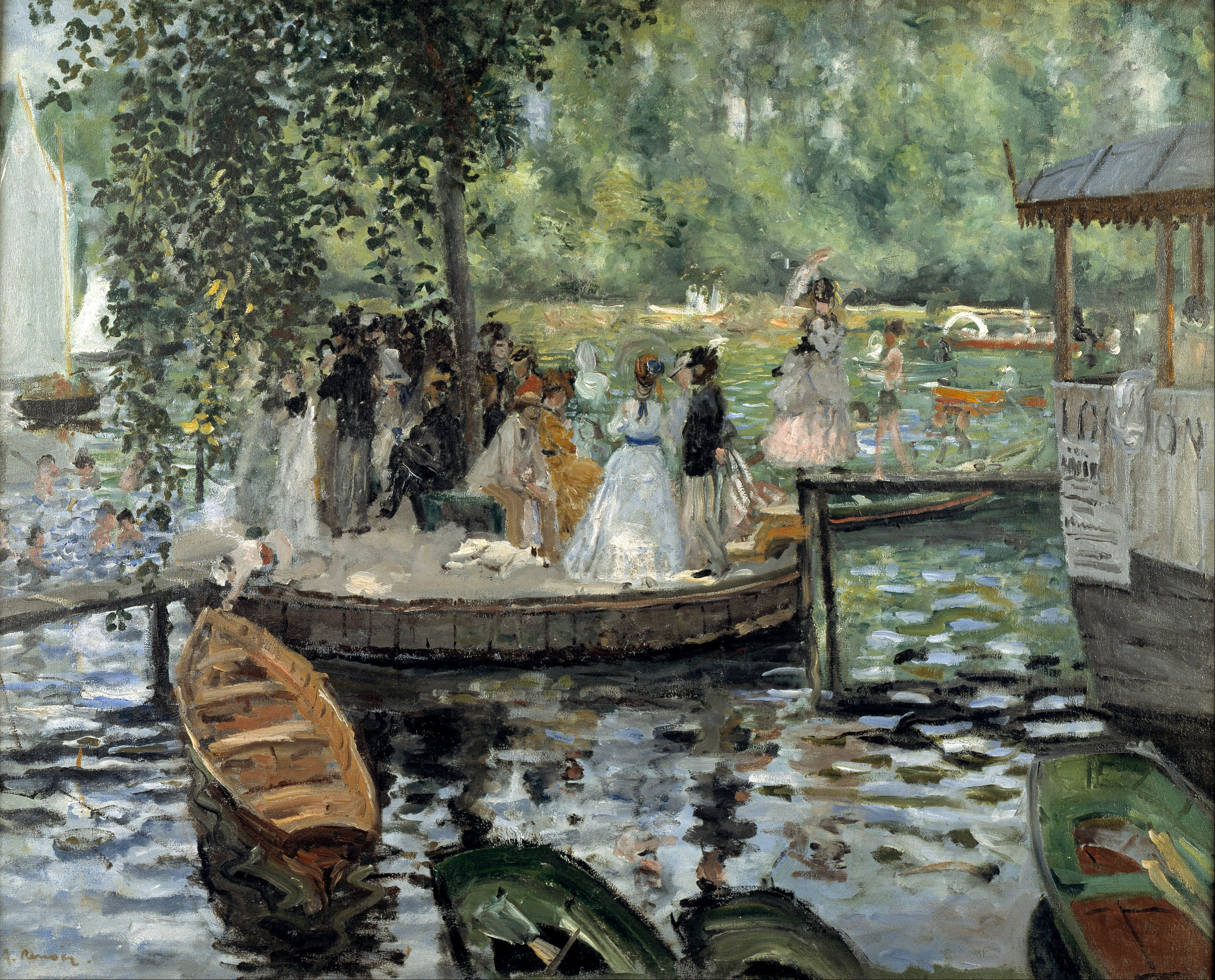
Pierre-Auguste Renoir, La grenouillère

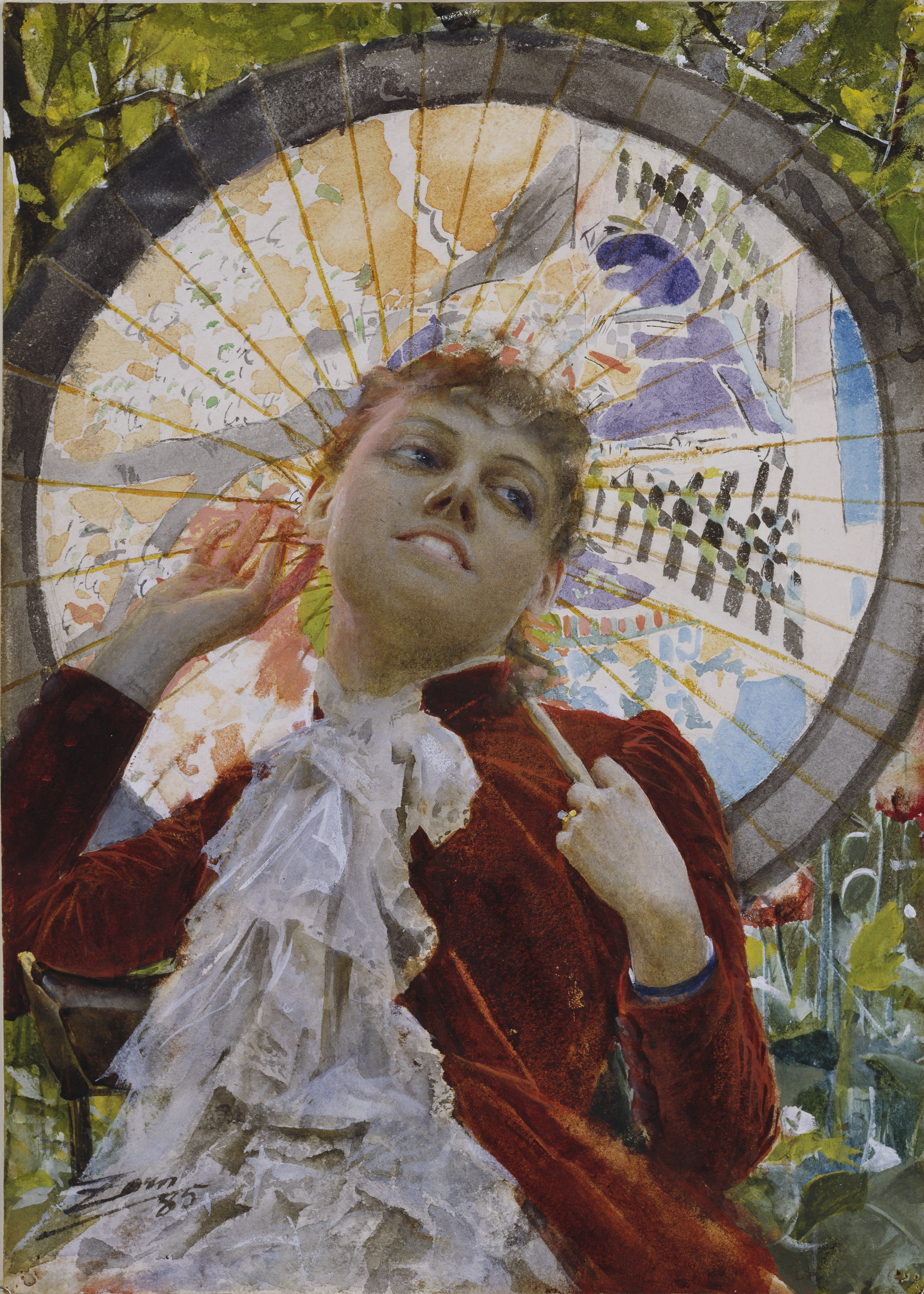
Anders Zorn, Castles in the Air, 1885

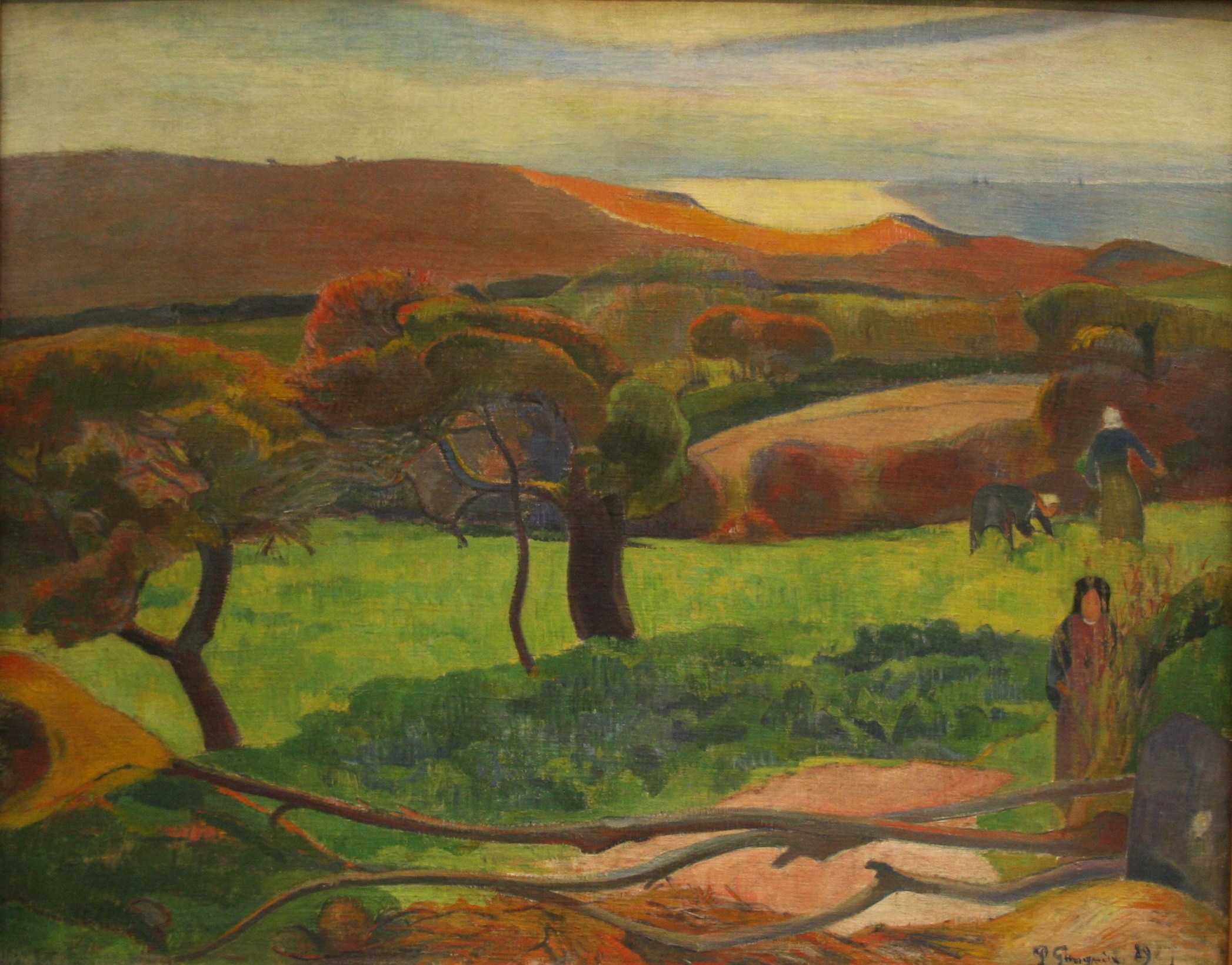
Paul Gauguin, Fields by the Sea, 1889

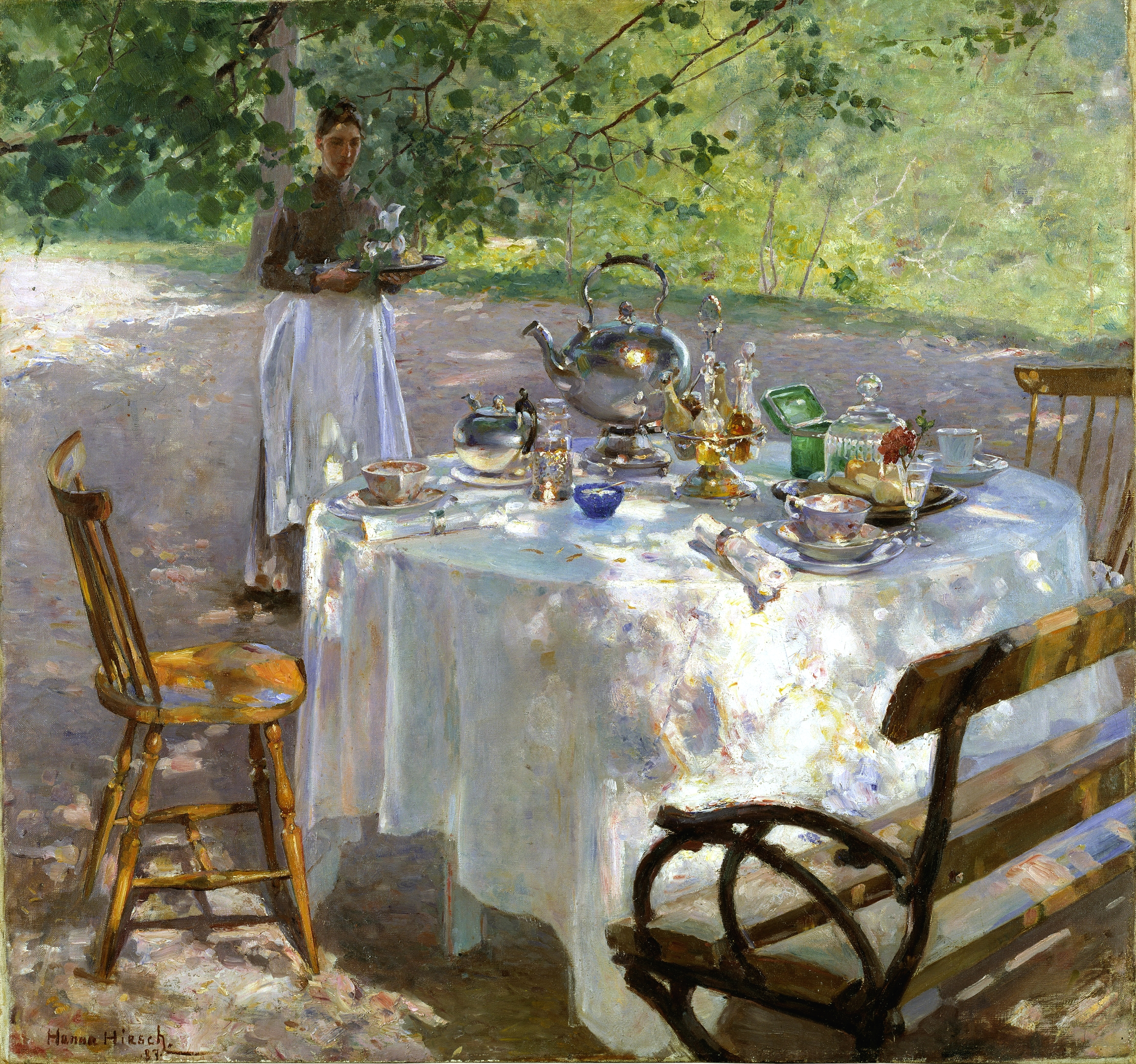
Hanna Pauli, Frukostdags

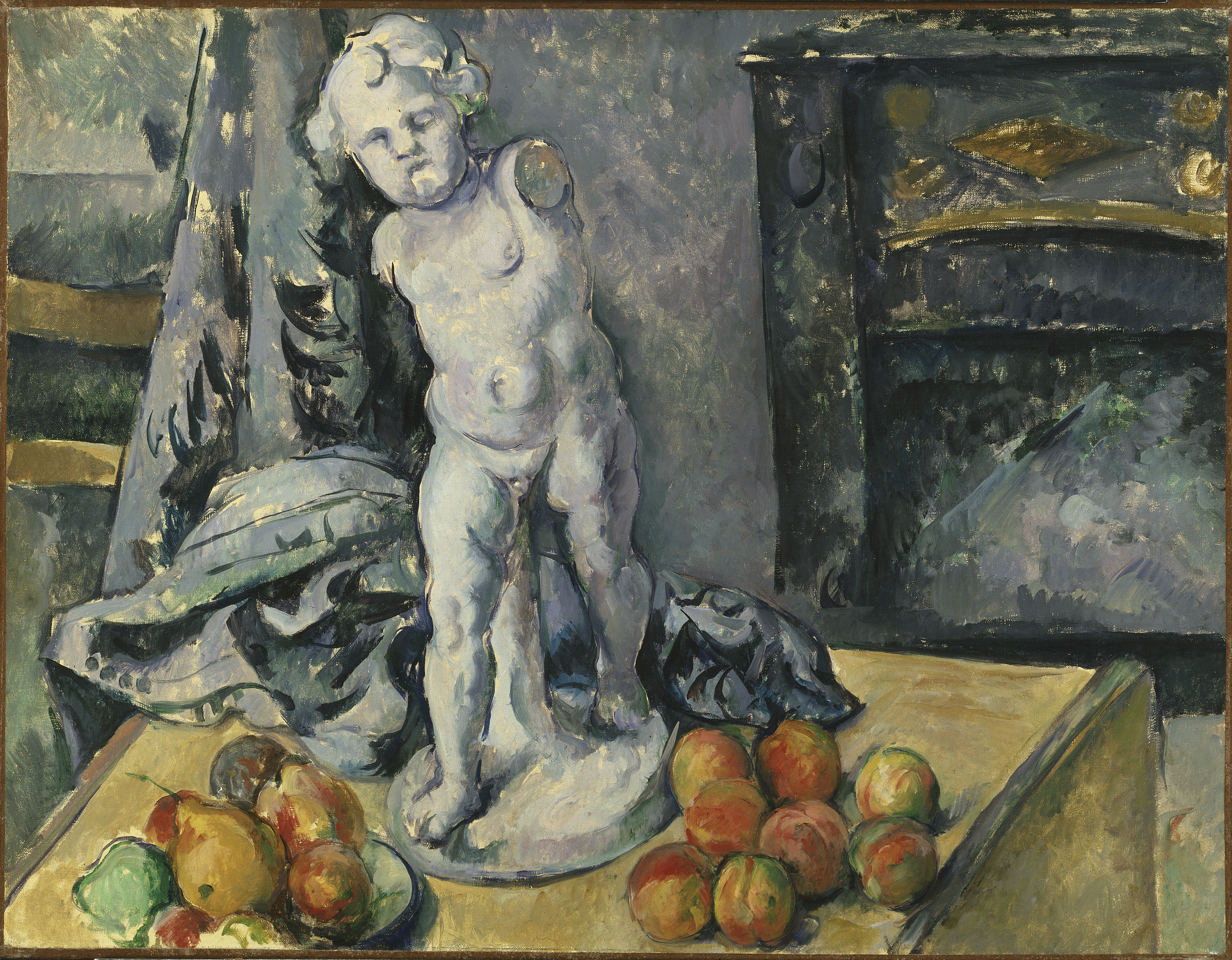
Paul Cézanne, Still Life with Plaster Cupid

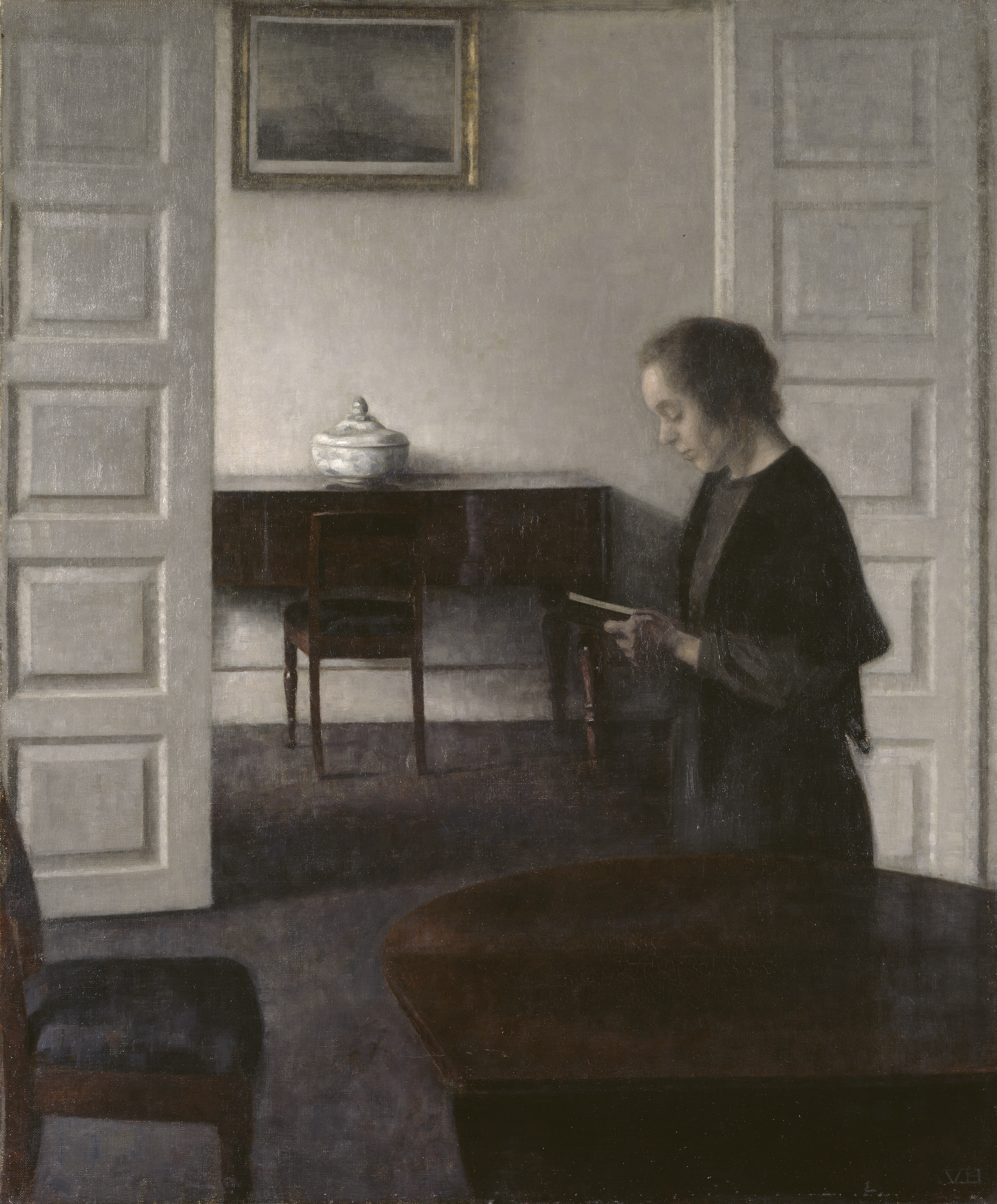
Vilhelm Hammershøi, Interior with a Reading Lady, c. 1900

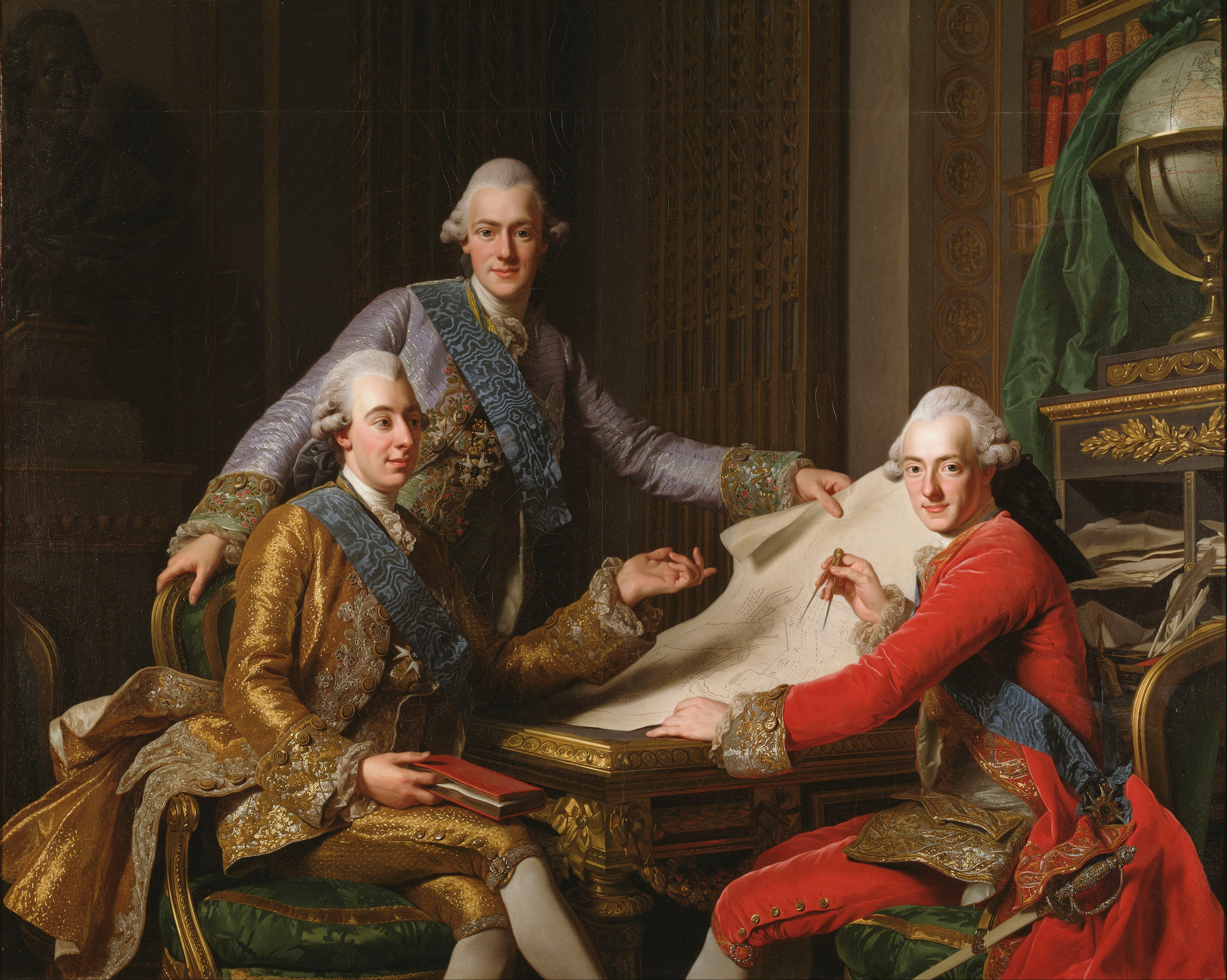
Alexander Roslin, King Gustav III of Sweden and His Brothers

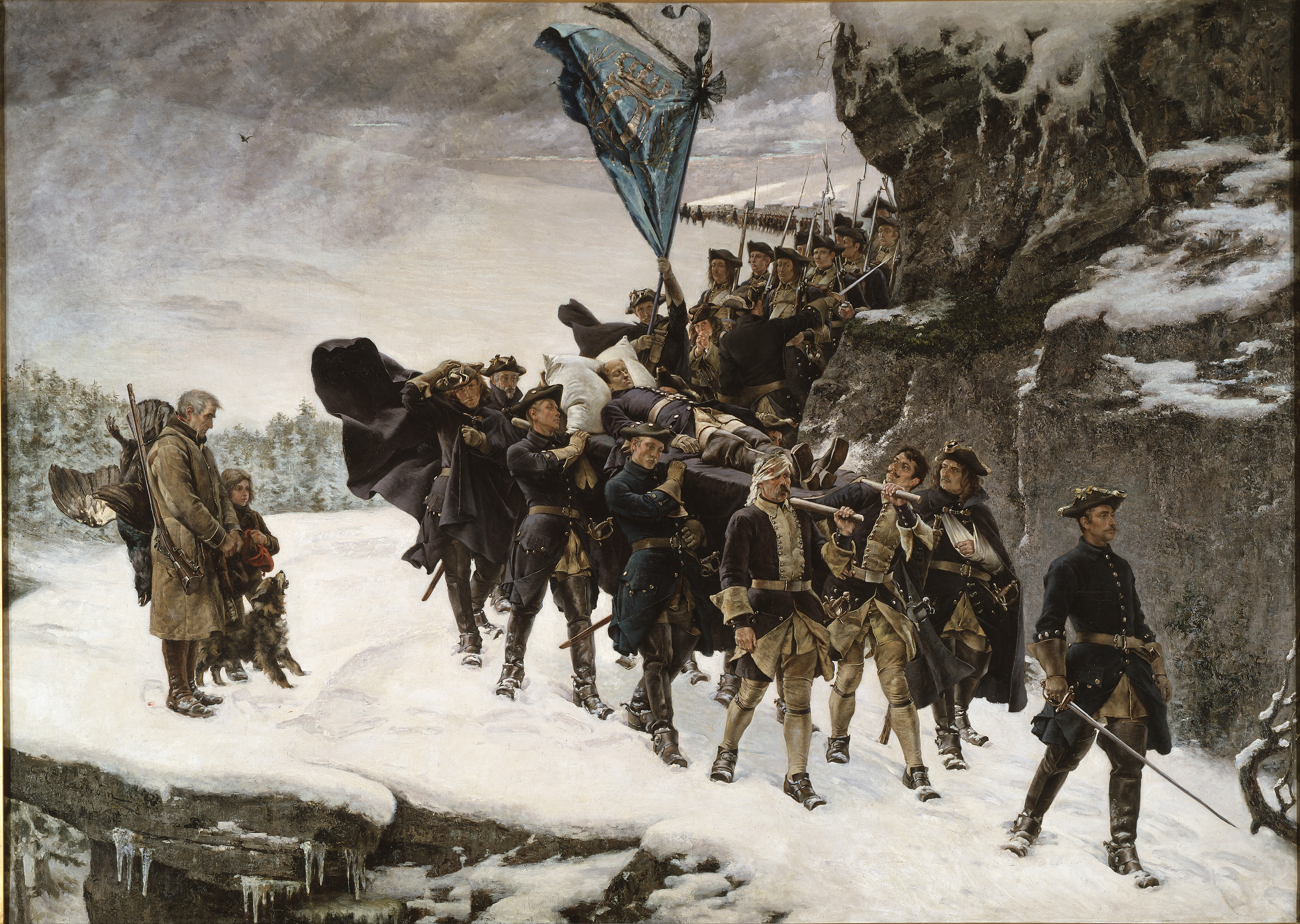
Gustaf Cederström, Bringing Home the Body of King Charles XII

=== Drawings ===
The collection of drawings contains approximately 500,000 sheets spanning the late medieval period to about 1900. The collection includes more than 2,000 Old Master drawings collected by Carl Gustaf Tessin. The sheets were acquired at the sale of the court banker Pierre Crozat in the summer of 1741. Tessin was one of 14 collectors who bought at bargain prices. Because of financial reasons, the collection was sold to King Adolf Fredrik.

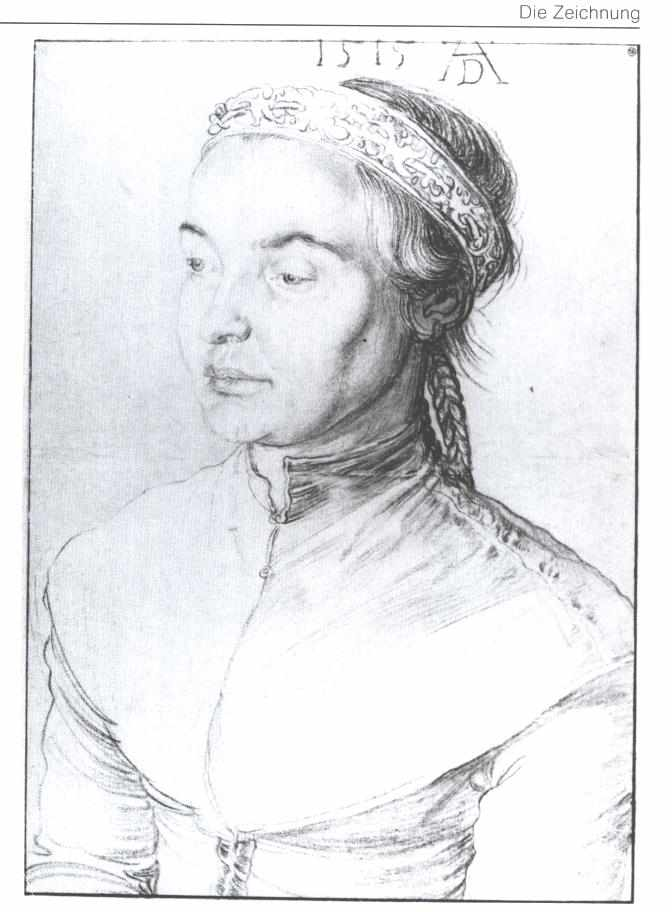
Albrecht Dürer, Portrait of a Young Woman with Braided Hair, 1515

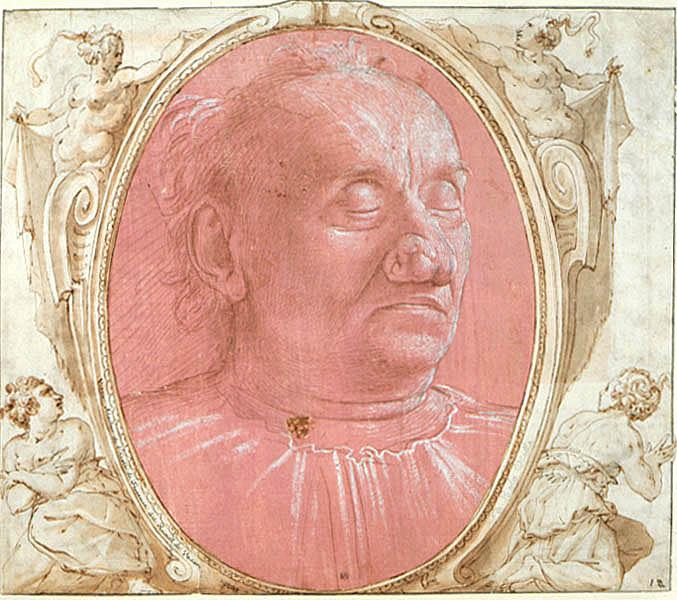
Domenico Ghirlandaio, Head of an Old Man, c. 1490

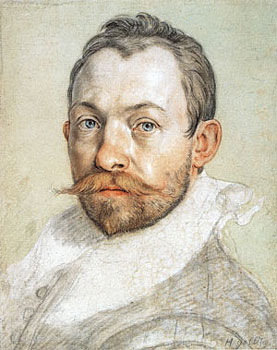
Hendrick Goltzius, Self-Portrait, c. 1590–91

== See also ==
- List of museums in Stockholm
- List of national galleries
- Hallwyl Palace
- Swedish Museum of National Antiquities
