= Bringing Home the Body of King Charles XII =

1878 painting by Gustaf Cederström

- Karl XII:s likfärd (Swedish)
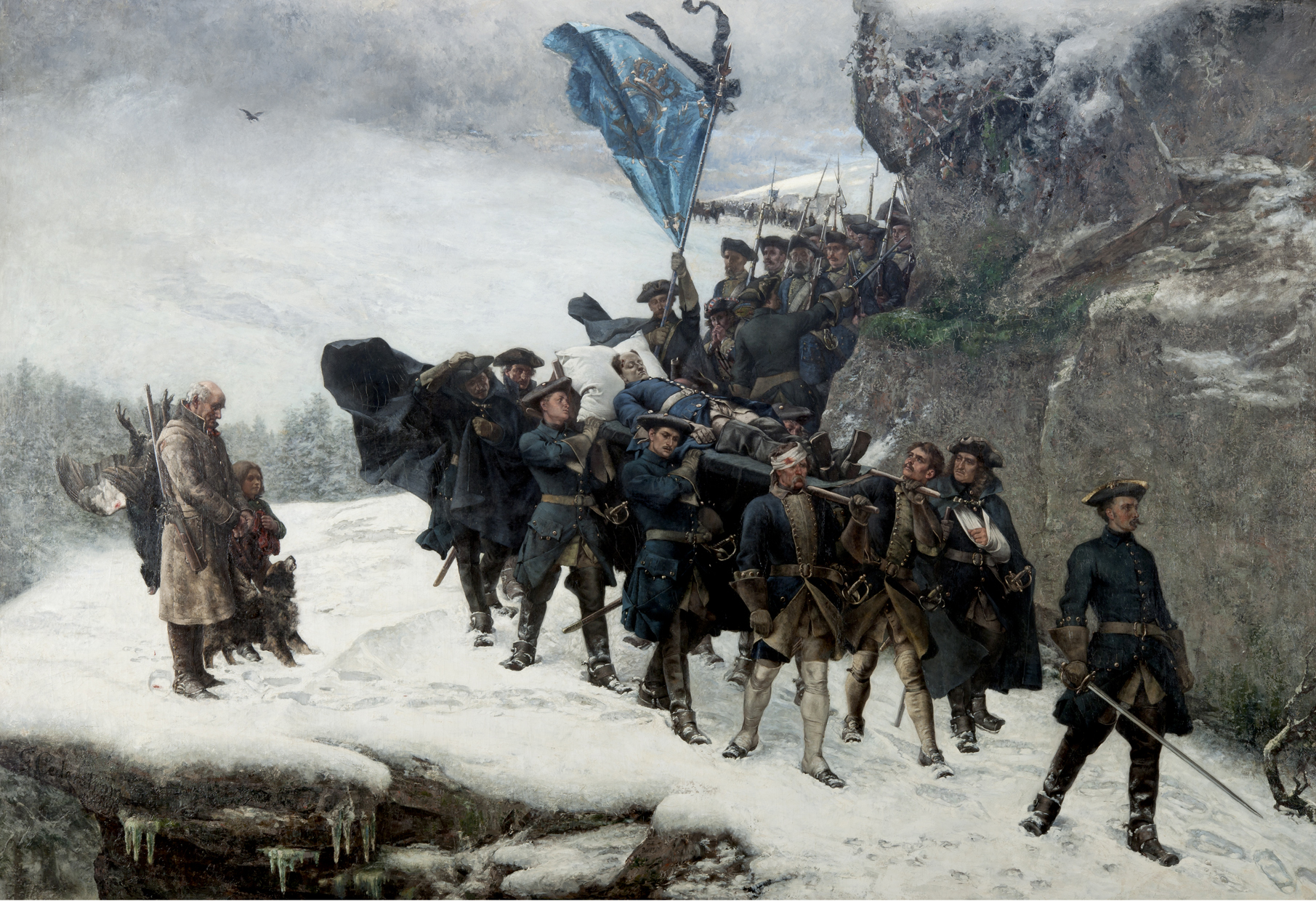
- Artist: Gustaf Cederström
- Year: 1878
- Medium: Oil on canvas
- Subject: Charles XII of Sweden
- Dimensions: 256 cm × 370 cm (101 in × 150 in)
- Location: Gothenburg Museum of Art, Charles XII Hall (room 15), Gothenburg

Bringing Home the Body of King Charles XII
- Karl XII:s likfärd (Swedish)
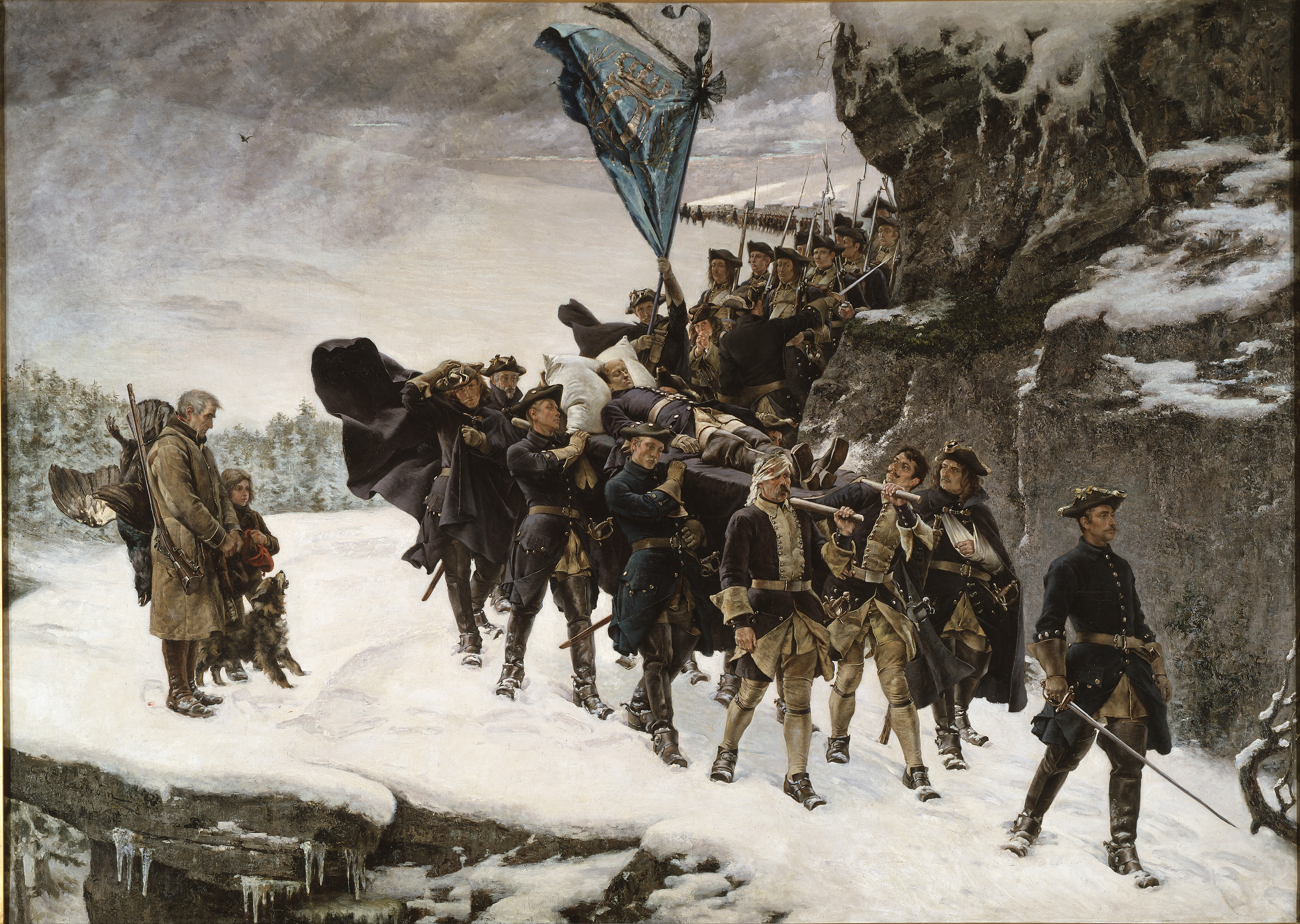
- Artist: Gustaf Cederström
- Year: 1884
- Medium: Oil on canvas
- Subject: Charles XII of Sweden
- Dimensions: 265 cm × 371 cm (104 in × 146 in)
- Location: Nationalmuseum, room 1413, Stockholm

Bringing Home the Body of King Charles XII is a painting by Swedish artist Gustaf Cederström, painted in Paris in 1878, displayed at Gothenburg Museum of Art. The author painted a second version in 1884, which is now on display in the Nationalmuseum in Stockholm. The scene depicts the repatriation of the body of Charles XII of Sweden, who was killed in Norway during the Siege of Fredriksten.

== History ==
The work was conceived to participate in the Exposition Universelle in Paris in May 1878. Cederström was a great admirer of Charles XII and decided to take him as the subject of the work. He had moved to Paris years earlier to study under master Léon Bonnat, who was initially sceptical about his pupil's chosen subject but later, seeing his enthusiasm, encouraged him to try, while warning him not to expect a positive response from the critics:

Essayez, vous êtes imprégné d'amour pour ce sujet, et aucun des autres que vous avez eu en tête ne vous a étreint avec la même chaleur. Je ne pense pas que vous allez atterrir avec, mais essayez, vous pouvez réussir.
Try it, you are filled with love for this subject, and none of the others you have had in mind have embraced you with the same warmth. I don't think you'll get that much out of it, but do try, you might succeed.

— Léon Bonnat

Cederström was therefore determined to make the painting as realistic as possible. He made numerous preliminary sketches (now in the Östergötlands Museum in the city of Linköping) and spared no expense in recreating the scene live before depicting it: he bought a huge amount of salt to simulate snow (otherwise unavailable in Paris in May), had a stretcher built for the model of the King to lie on and also had specially ordered uniforms to be sent from Sweden for the models of the soldiers to wear. The remaining figures not represented by human models were crafted in wax by Cederström himself. During his work, he felt discouraged several times, both by his teacher's warning and by the negative outcome of his previous painting titled Albert of Mecklenburg mocked by Queen Margaret, which received much criticism.

When the painting was acquired and viewed by the gallery before the exhibition opened to the public, he marked this moment in his diary:

Ibland såg jag nog under arbetets gång, att det låg något storslaget över duken, men i sista minuten då den skulle gå till Champ de Mars, kom missmodet över mig, och då den bars in i den svenska avdelningen utan att någon till mig yttrade ett ord, vare sig beröm eller klander, var jag viss om att den var misslyckad, den liksom förut ’Margareta’. Jag gick hem förtvivlad, viss om nederlag. Nu var det att resa hem, slå målningen ur hågen och gräma sig hela sitt liv.
From time to time, during the work, I saw that there was something grand about the canvas, but at the last moment, when it was time to go to the Champ de Mars, discouragement had the best of me, and when the painting was carried into the Swedish department without anyone saying a word to me, neither praise nor blame, I was sure that it was a failure, like 'Margareta' before it. I went home in despair, certain of defeat. Now it was time to go home, knock the painting out of my head and grieve all my life.

—Gustaf Cederström

Contrary to the author's expectations, however, the work was appreciated so much that the artist was awarded the second place medal, thanks to which he was made famous throughout Europe. After the exhibition was over, the painting was bought for 22000 francs by the Grand Duke Konstantin Konstantinovich of Russia, who took it to his home in Saint Petersburg, the Marble Palace. Shortly after, Cederström also received news that his wife gave birth to their daughter. As proof of his admiration for the portrayed king, he named her Carola in his honour. We still read in his diaries:

[...] och så lyste solen upp, och detta år som börjat så tungt slutades i glädje och solsken med födelsen av min dotter, som till minne av striden fick namn efter den, i vart namn striden stått. En hård energisk kamp med stora svårigheter hade jag då i 13 månader bestått, isolerad i min ateljé. Det gällde seger eller undergång och tack vare goda makter, i vilkas hägn jag arbetat, blev det ej det senare
[...] and then the sun shone, and this year, which had begun so heavily, ended in joy and sunshine with the birth of my daughter, who was named in memory of the battle after he in whose name the battle was fought. I had then endured a hard, energy-draining struggle with great difficulty for 13 months, isolated in my studio. It was a question of victory or ruin, and thanks to the good powers in whose shelter I worked, it was not the latter.

—Gustaf Cederström

The painting depicts an extremely important moment in Swedish history, both geopolitically and emotionally. The death of Charles XII marked the end of the Great Northern War, the decline of Sweden as a great European power and the beginning of the Age of Liberty. For these reasons, many of Cederström's compatriots were outraged by the news that the painting had been bought by a Russian, considering it a disgrace that the funerary tribute to the warrior king had ended up in the enemy country he had fought against. To convince the author to paint a new version, his admirers organised a fund-raising campaign that raised 11000 kronas. Cederström was still in Paris when he accepted this commission. He immediately started to work based on sketches of the original painting. He continued it in Florence, where he stayed for a short time, and finished it at home, in his house in Krusenberg, just south of Uppsala. On 30 November 1884, the anniversary of the death of Charles XII, he signed the canvas and delivered it to the museum in Stockholm.
As for the original, it is unclear how it survived the upheavals of the October Revolution, but in 1923 the art dealer Max Molvidson managed to buy it for 7500 roubles and bring it back to Sweden. He then sold it to Gustaf Werner, who subsequently donated it to the Gothenburg Museum of Art in 1939, where it is still exhibited today.

== Style ==
Realist only in intentions and pictorial technique, the painting is actually the result of a highly fictionalised interpretation of the events. In fact, the King was not repatriated in broad daylight on an open stretcher but at night to the camp in Tistedalen and from there in a pine coffin to Uddevalla, where he was embalmed. The most likely route would have been either the one that corresponds to today's state road 220 in Norway (which from the Swedish border is called state road 165) or the state road 884 (which later becomes state road 166 in Sweden). Since both routes are rather flat, the mountains in the background are a very loose reinterpretation of the landscape. This choice was inspired by the Catastrophe on Øyfjellet (also known as the Carolean Death March), in which 3000 soldiers of the contingent led by Carl Gustaf Armfeldt froze to death, caught in a blizzard on their way back home through the northern part of the Sylan mountains in the Tydalen region. Cederström was well aware that he had taken such artistic liberties and in 1919 responded to the criticism by commenting:

Ej bars Carl XII obetäckt över gränsen, men har det stött någon människa att jag framställt honom så? ...Absolut lögn bör man akta sig för, men en väl vald licentia poetica måste vara tillåten.
Charles XII was not carried in broad daylight across the border, but has it wronged anyone that I have represented him so? ...Absolute falsehood must be avoided, but a well-chosen licentia poetica must be allowed.

—Gustaf Cederström

== Differences between the two versions ==
Comparison of the two paintings
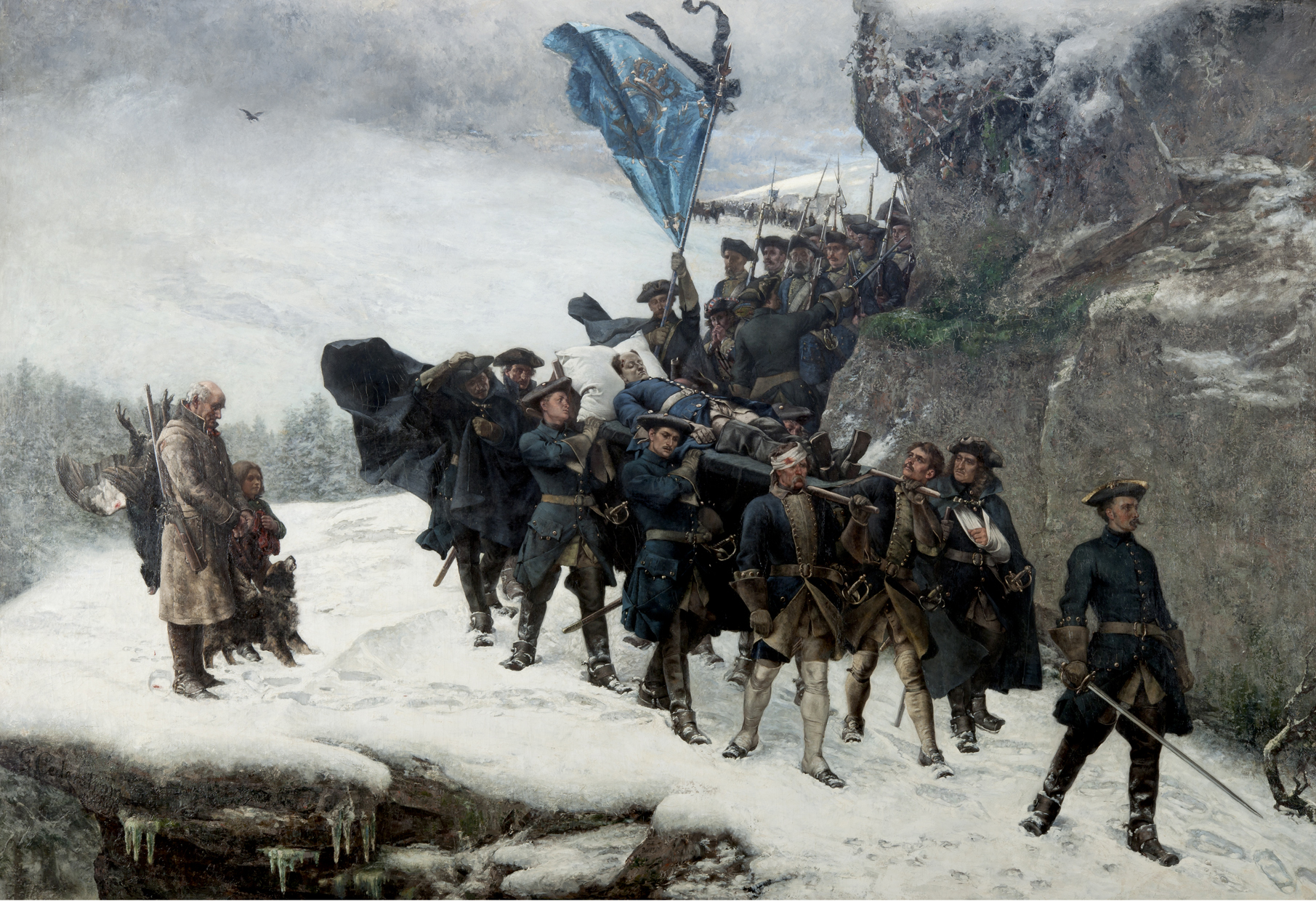
1878 version (Gothenburg)

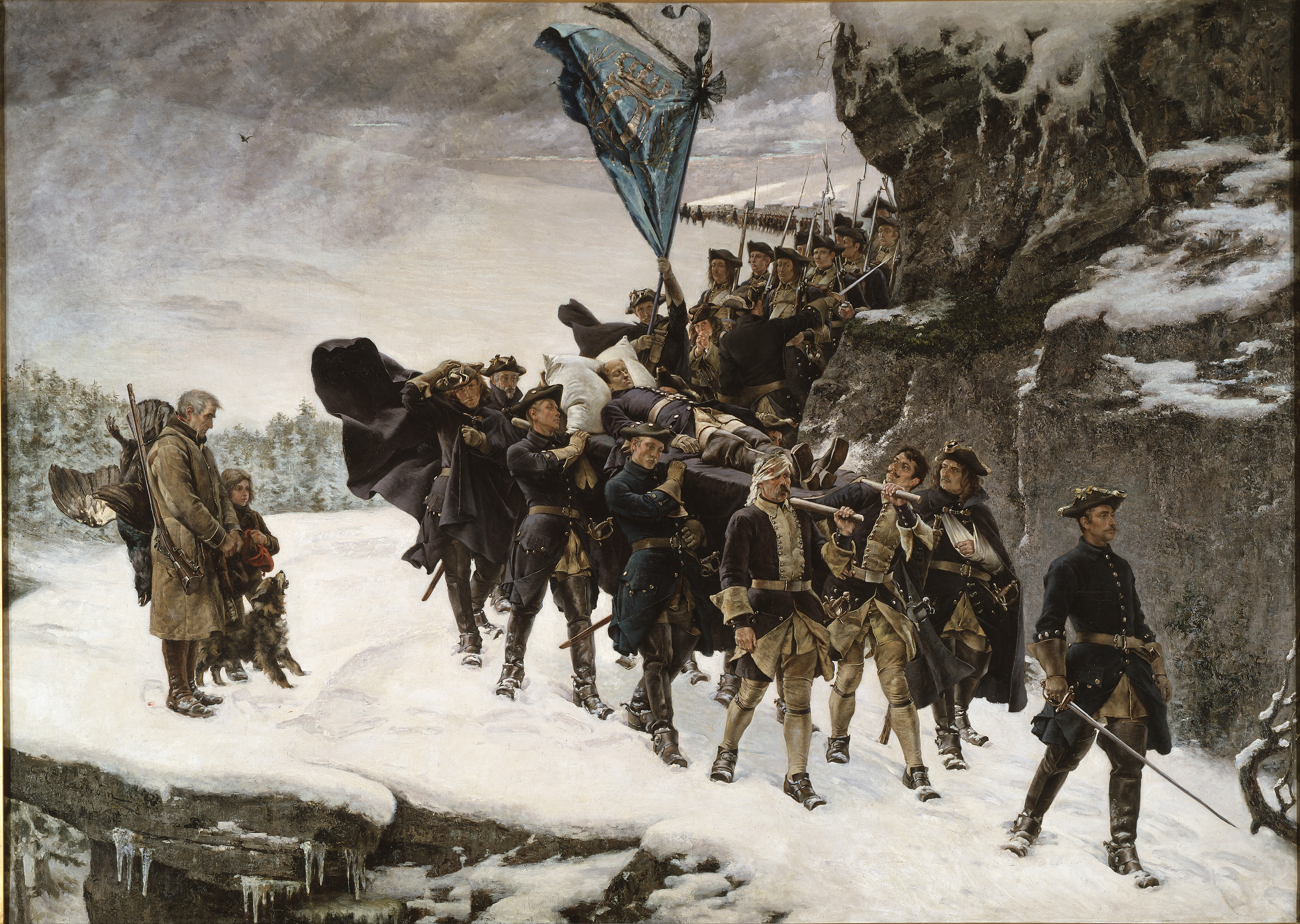
1884 version (Stockholm)

Those who posed as models were always hired locally for obvious practical reasons. The first version was painted entirely in Paris, the models were therefore all French. The second version, on the other hand, was started in France but continued in Italy and finished in Sweden with Swedish models, which is why many characters have lighter hair and eyes than their Parisian counterparts.

Moreover, in the second version, Cederström also decided to portray his friends and relatives. The king is represented by Raffaele Fusco (the only Italian among all the models), the soldier with the bandaged head has the face of Carl Cederström while the little girl next to the hunter has that of Carola Cederström, respectively the author's elder brother and daughter. The soldier at the head of the procession has the face of Gustaf Cederström himself in both versions.

== See also ==
- History painting
