= Siege of Fredriksten =

1718 siege of the Great Northern War

Coordinates: 59.1198°N 11.3963°E

- Part of the Great Northern War
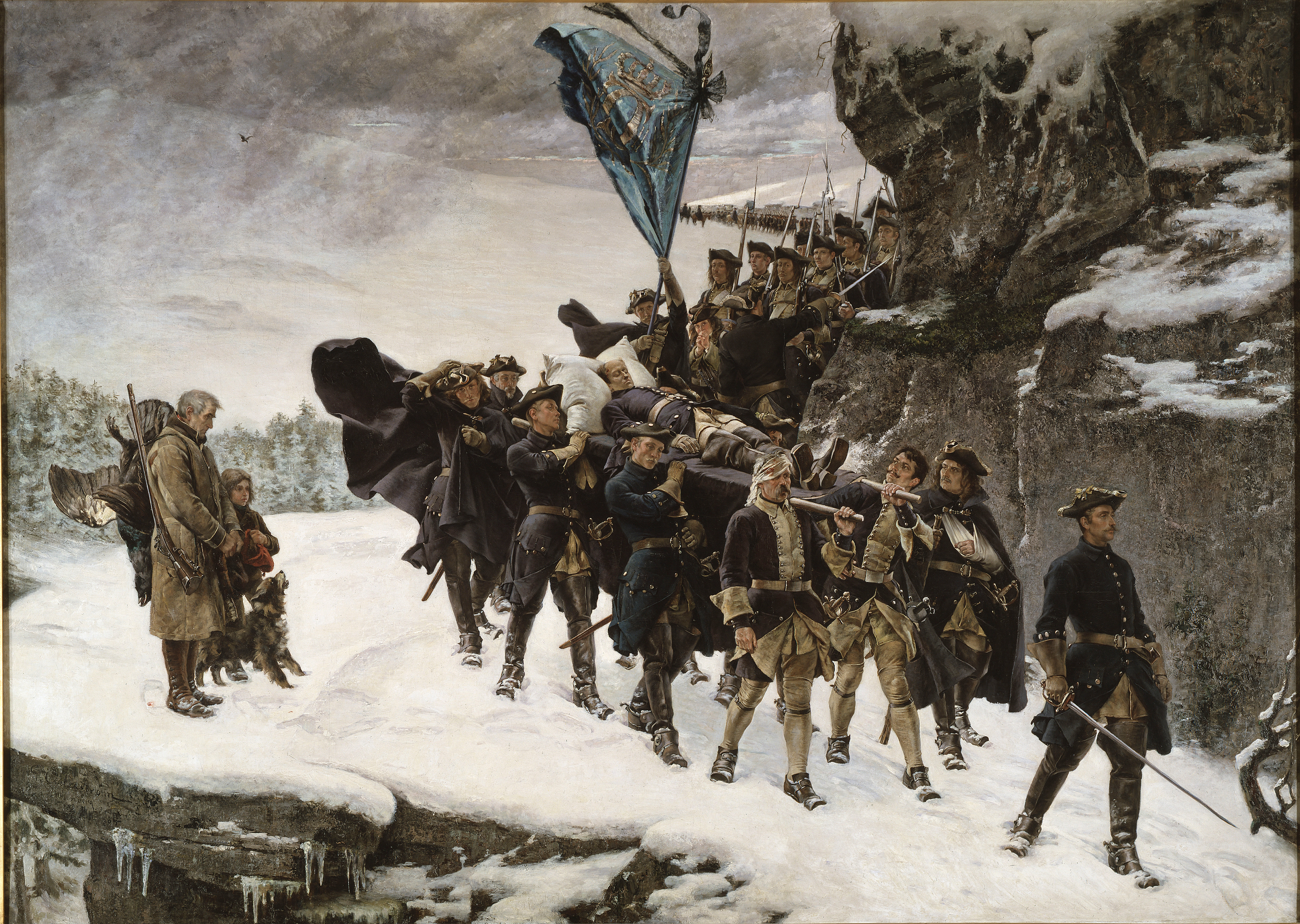
- Bringing Home the Body of King Charles XII by Gustaf Cederström in 1884
Date	11 December [O.S. 30 November] 1718
Location	Fredriksten, Fredrikshald, Denmark–Norway
Result	Dano-Norwegian victory

Belligerents
Denmark–Norway	(yes) Swedish Empire

Commanders and leaders
(Denmark–Norway) Barthold Landsberg	(Swedish Empire) Charles XII †

Strength
1,400–1,800	5,000–6,000

Casualties and losses
9 killed 10 wounded 19 captured	Unknown

The siege of Fredriksten (Norwegian: Beleiringen av Fredriksten festning) was an attack on the Norwegian fortress of Fredriksten in the city of Fredrikshald (now Halden) by King Charles XII of Sweden. While inspecting his troops' lines, Charles XII was killed by a projectile. The Swedes broke off the siege, and the Norwegians held the fortress. Along with the Treaty of Nystad three years later, the death of Charles XII marked the end of the imperial era in Sweden, and the beginning of the Age of Liberty (Swedish: Frihetstiden) in that country.

== Background ==
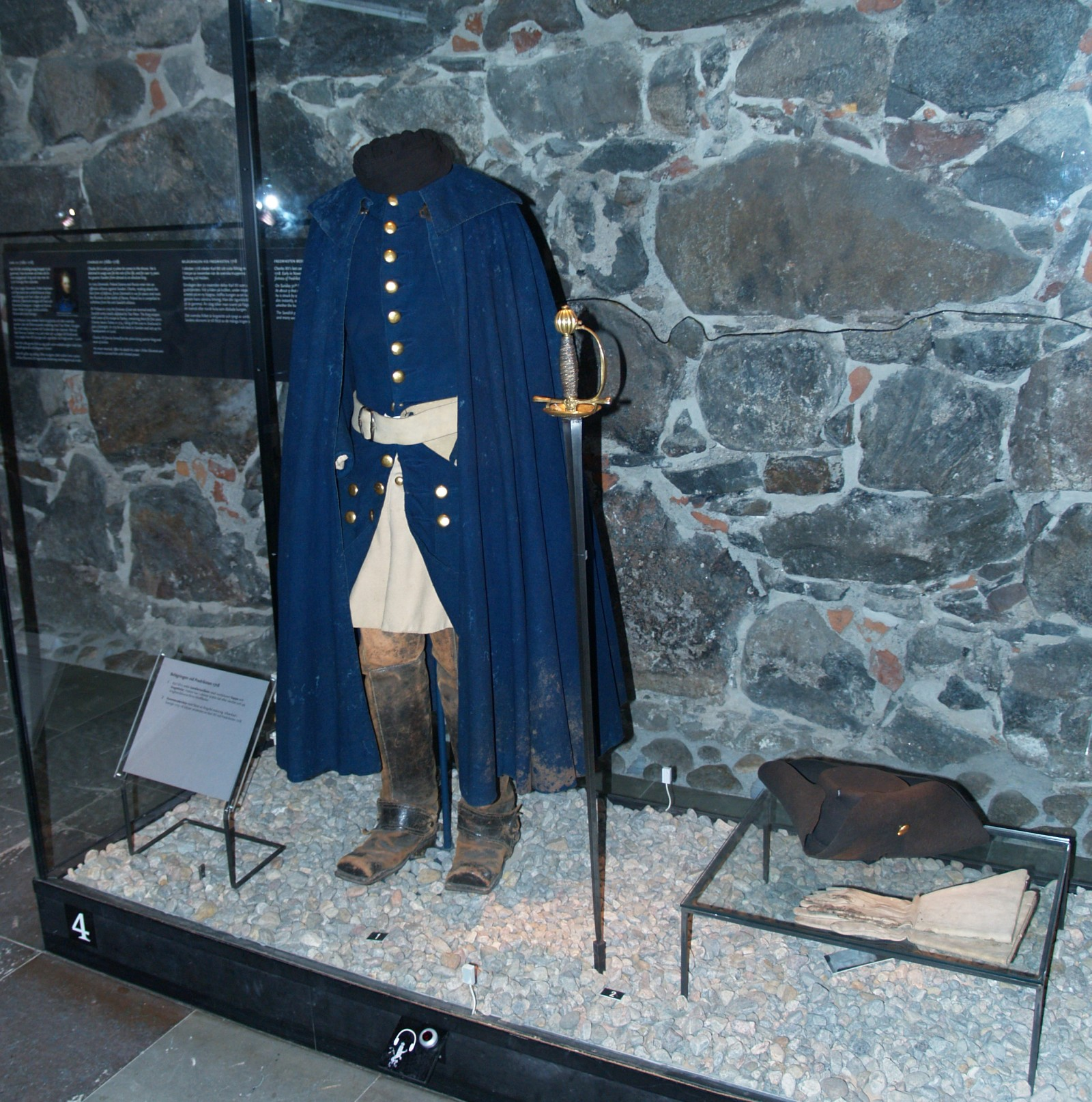
Charles XII of Sweden's uniform, the one he wore when he died at Fredriksten. On display at Livrustkammaren in Stockholm.

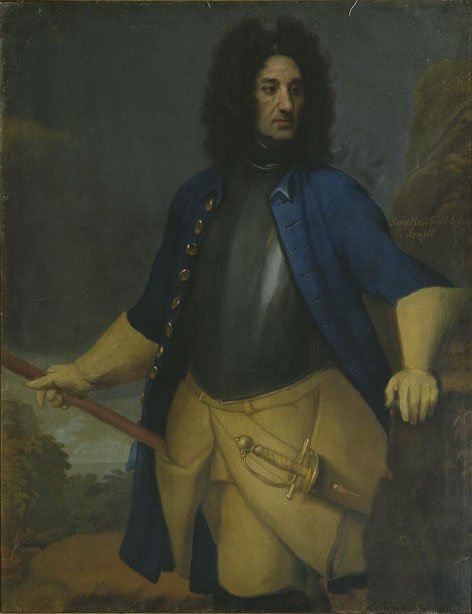
Carl Gustaf Armfeldt

King Charles XII of Sweden made several campaigns into the city during the Great Northern War (Swedish: Stora nordiska kriget) as part of his campaign to capture Norway. At the close of the Great Northern War, the Norwegian Army had been weakened in early 1716 by withdrawal of 5000 of the best troops to Denmark. When rumors reached Christiania (now Oslo) that Charles XII was preparing to invade, all remaining troops in Østerdal and Gudbrandsdal were ordered to the border at Halden and Fredrikstad. The Norwegians expected Swedish forces to invade at Kongsvinger, Basmo and/or Halden.

It was at Basmo Fortress (Basmo festning) where Charles struck, crossing the border on 8 March 1716. The Norwegian scorched earth policy and guerrilla raid interdiction of supply chains by the residents of Bohuslen deprived Charles of supplies, while the fortresses still held by the Norwegians behind his lines threatened his supply chain. Charles took Christiania (now Oslo), but without heavy siege artillery, was unable to take Akershus Fortress.

After a brief occupation, Charles retraced his steps to the Norwegian fortresses in southeastern Norway with the objective of capturing Fredriksten. This would remove the threat at his back, and the fortifications could serve as the base for a renewed offensive later that year. Capturing the harbours at the mouth of the Glomma river would also allow him to land the necessary provisions for a successful siege of Akershus Fortress.

Charles' troops attempted to take Fredriksten by storm on 4 July. His troops took the town after fierce fighting, but the citizens set fire to their own houses, forcing Charles, unable to take the fortress, to retreat and await the arrival of heavy siege guns. Unfortunately for the invading army the entire Swedish transport fleet was captured or destroyed by the Norwegian naval commander Peter Wessel Tordenskjold (1690-1720) at the Battle of Dynekilen (Slaget om Dynekilen) in Bohuslen. Running low on supplies, Charles retreated hastily across the Svinesund and burned the bridges behind him. By 12 July 1716 all Swedish troops had been withdrawn from the area around Fredriksten.

== Siege ==
Leaving some 14,000 men in the defense of southern Sweden, Charles XII once again invaded southern Norway in the autumn of 1718, this time with 36,000 men, which were divided into 3 armies. He did this intending to first capture Fredriksten fortress to be able to sustain a siege of Akershus. By first taking the border areas, Charles wished to avoid a repeat of the fiasco he had suffered two years before. The Frederiksten garrison, of between 1,400 and 1,800 men, fought ferociously to hold back the besieging force of some 5,000–6,000 Swedes under the personal command of their king. The defenders, however, suffered a severe setback when, on 8 December the forward fortification, Gyldenløve fort, at Fredriksten fell. Encouraged by their very hard-fought success the Swedish army intensified their efforts against the main fort.

The Swedish trenches had almost reached the main fortification walls when on the evening of 11 December [O.S. 30 November], a projectile (probably a large musket ball or grapeshot) struck Charles XII through the left temple while he inspected the trench-works and killed him. The death of the king effectively ended the attack on Fredriksten and the invasion was called off, leading to the conclusion of the war.

== Sources ==
- Petri, Gustaf (1937). "Karakteristiska drag i Karl XII:s fältherrekonst" [Characteristics of Charles XII's Art of War]. Karolinska Förbundets Årsbok (in Swedish). Stockholm: 131–163. OCLC 1418970164.
