= Barthold Nicolai Landsberg =

Norwegian Army general (1668–1740)

Barthold Nicolai von Landsberg
- Born: c. 1668; Holstein
- Died: 18 February 1740; Fredrikstad
- Occupations: Military officer, commander of the Fredriksten Fortress

Barthold Nicolai von Landsberg (c. 1668 – 18 February 1740) was a Dano-Norwegian military officer. He was born in Holstein. He was a lieutenant colonel and in command of the Fredriksten Fortress from 1717, during the Great Northern War, and was responsible for defending the fortress against attacks from Charles XII in 1718. Charles XII was killed during the siege of the fortress, and this effectively ended the Swedish campaign in Norway. Landsberg was assigned the rank of Lieutenant General in 1739. He died in Fredrikstad in 1740. A memorial of Landsberg was raised at the Fredriksten Fortress, and a square in Halden is named after him.

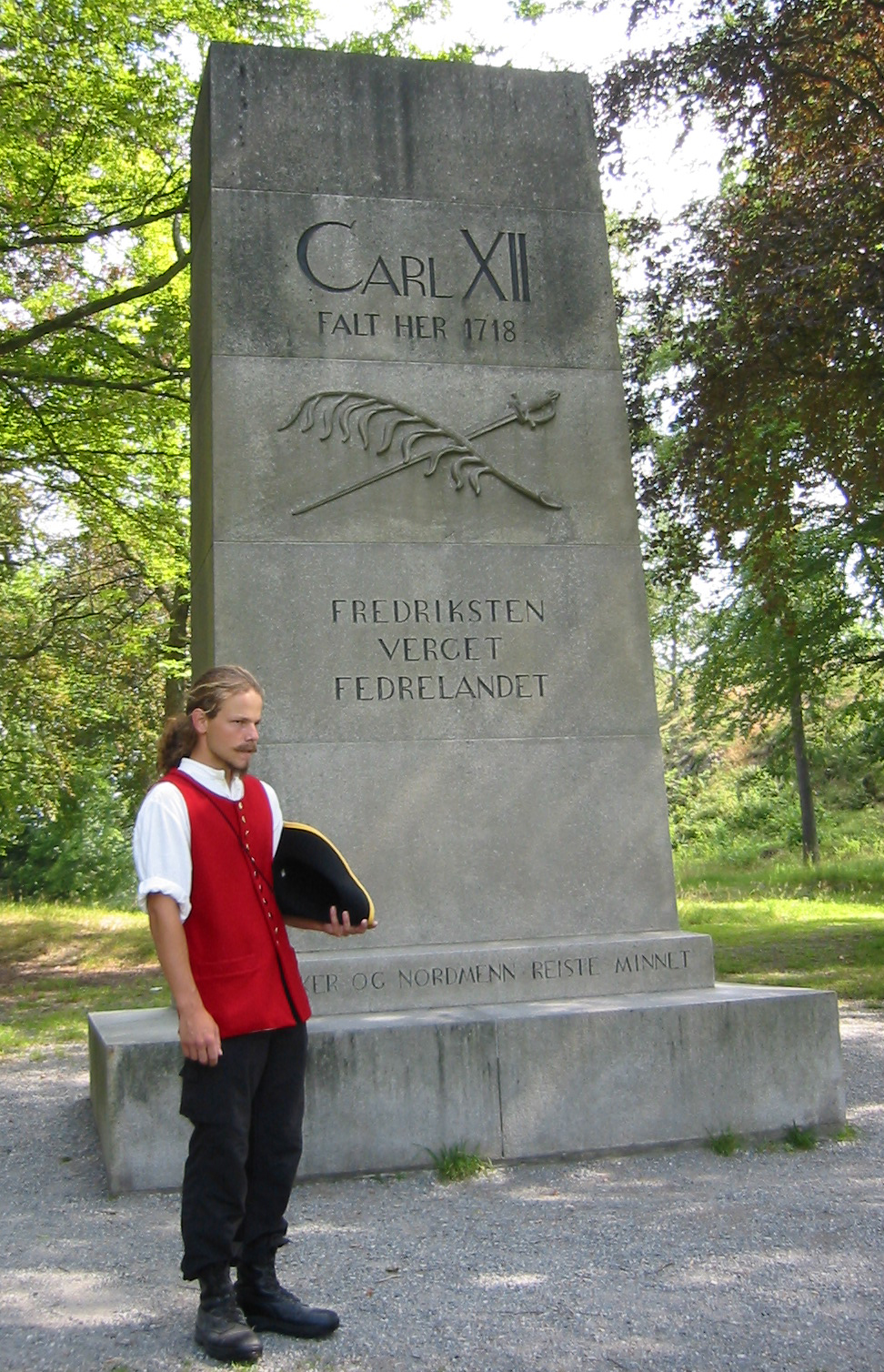
Charles XII memorial at Fredriksten Fortress, where he was killed in 1718.
