= André Sicre =

French military engineer

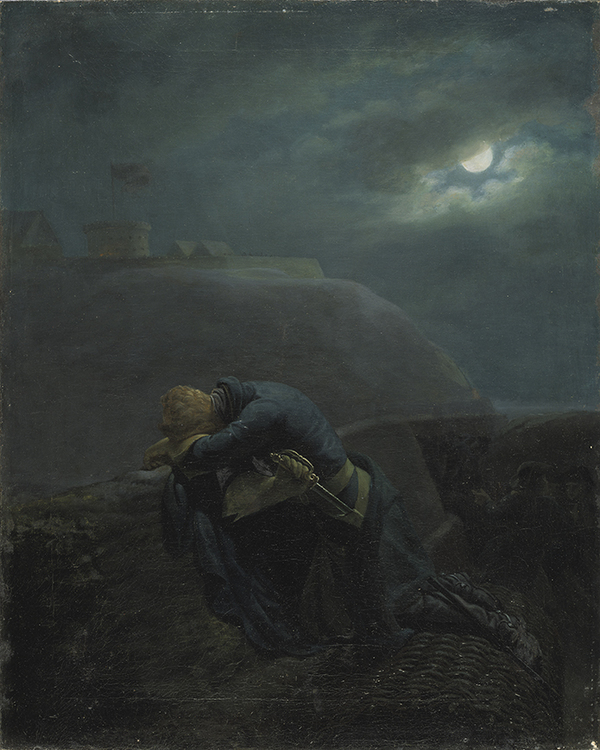
The death of the king as shown in Voltaire's biography of Charles XII

André Sicre (died 1733 in Paris) was a French military engineer who also was aide-de-camp to Frederick of Hesse and often has been named as the hired assassin of King Charles XII of Sweden.

== Career ==
After being shipwrecked on the island of Chios in 1712, Sicre began to serve Charles XII in Bendery. He went with the Swedes to Stralsund and subsequently took part in the siege of that town. He was captured but managed to flee to Sweden in 1716.

Sicre was hired by Charles’s brother-in-law and generalissimus Frederick of Hesse in a Scanian cavalry regiment and eventually became Frederick’s top aide-de-camp. During King Charles’s second invasion of Norway in 1718, Sicre was in his troops at Fredriksten. Late in the evening of 30 November, Sicre was positioned in the dugout near the king. He disappeared just before Charles was shot, but soon reappeared and placed his wig and hat over the dead king’s face, while himself donning Charles’s hat perforated by the gunshot. He then rode at once to Frederick’s command center at Torpum to announce the king’s death, and immediately rode on all the way to Stockholm to inform Ulrica Eleonora of Sweden, Charles's sister and Frederick's wife, of what had transpired at Fredriksten.

After the invasion of Norway had been called off due to Charles’s death, and Ulrica Eleonora had ascended to the Swedish throne, Frederick promoted Sicre again, but rumors of his involvement in the king’s demise made Frederick send him abroad. A Lieutenant Schultz came forward and claimed to know that Sicre had been offered a large sum of money to assassinate Charles.

Sicre returned to Stockholm already in 1722 but then had contracted typhoid fever. In 1723, it was blamed on mental illness when he opened a window of his house and shouted to people passing below that it was he who had killed Charles. Frederick had now become King of Sweden himself and tried to put a stop to the rumors, having Sicre take back his confession, but to no avail.

By 1728 Sicre’s health had begun to improve and he moved back to France. His financial situation was very bad, and he constantly wrote to King Frederick and Queen Ulrica Eleonora who sent him money.

== Death ==
André Sicre died a poor man in Paris in 1733.

Some Swedish historians have concluded that substantial evidence points to Sicre, acting on behalf of Frederick, as the assassin of Charles XII, however acknowledging that definite proof cannot to be ascertained.
