= Norway during the Great Northern War =

Role of Norway in the Great Northern War

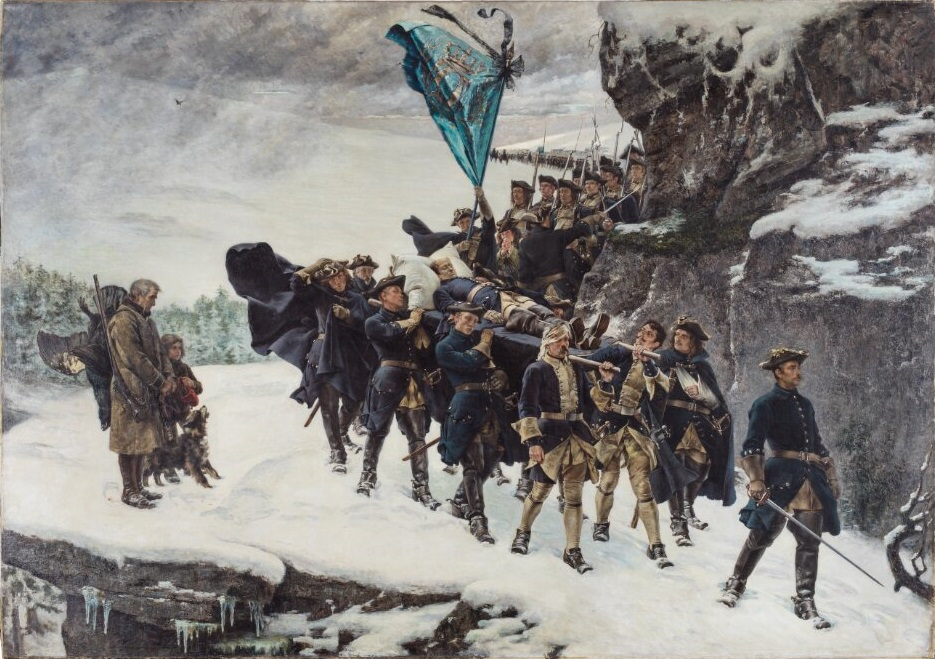
Bringing Home the Body of King Karl XII of Sweden (Gustaf Cederström. 1884)

The Great Northern War was the war fought between a coalition of Denmark–Norway, Russia and Saxony-Poland (from 1715 also Prussia and Hanover) on one side and Sweden on the other side from 1700 to 1721. It started by a coordinated attack on Sweden by the coalition in 1700, and ended 1721 with the conclusion of the Treaty of Nystad, and the Stockholm Treaties. As a result of the war, Russia supplanted Sweden as the dominant power on the shores of the Baltic Sea, becoming a major player in European politics.

== Setting the stage for war ==
Between 1561 and 1658, Sweden fought a series of wars in the Baltic, establishing an empire. During this period Sweden had occupied the Danish provinces of Skåne, Blekinge and Halland and the Norwegian provinces of Jämtland, Härjedalen, Trøndelag and Bohuslän. For Denmark, even more than the loss of territory, the continuous Swedish interference in Holstein (supporting claims for lands in Danish held Schleswig) was a major bone of contention.

In the late 1690s Russia, who had also lost territory to Sweden, allied with Denmark–Norway, together with the Elector of Saxony, who was King of Poland who expected a reconquest of territory lost by his kingdom to strengthen his domestic position. When the young Charles XII ascended Sweden's throne in 1697, the opportunity appeared ripe for recapturing lost territory.

== Battle of Narva ==
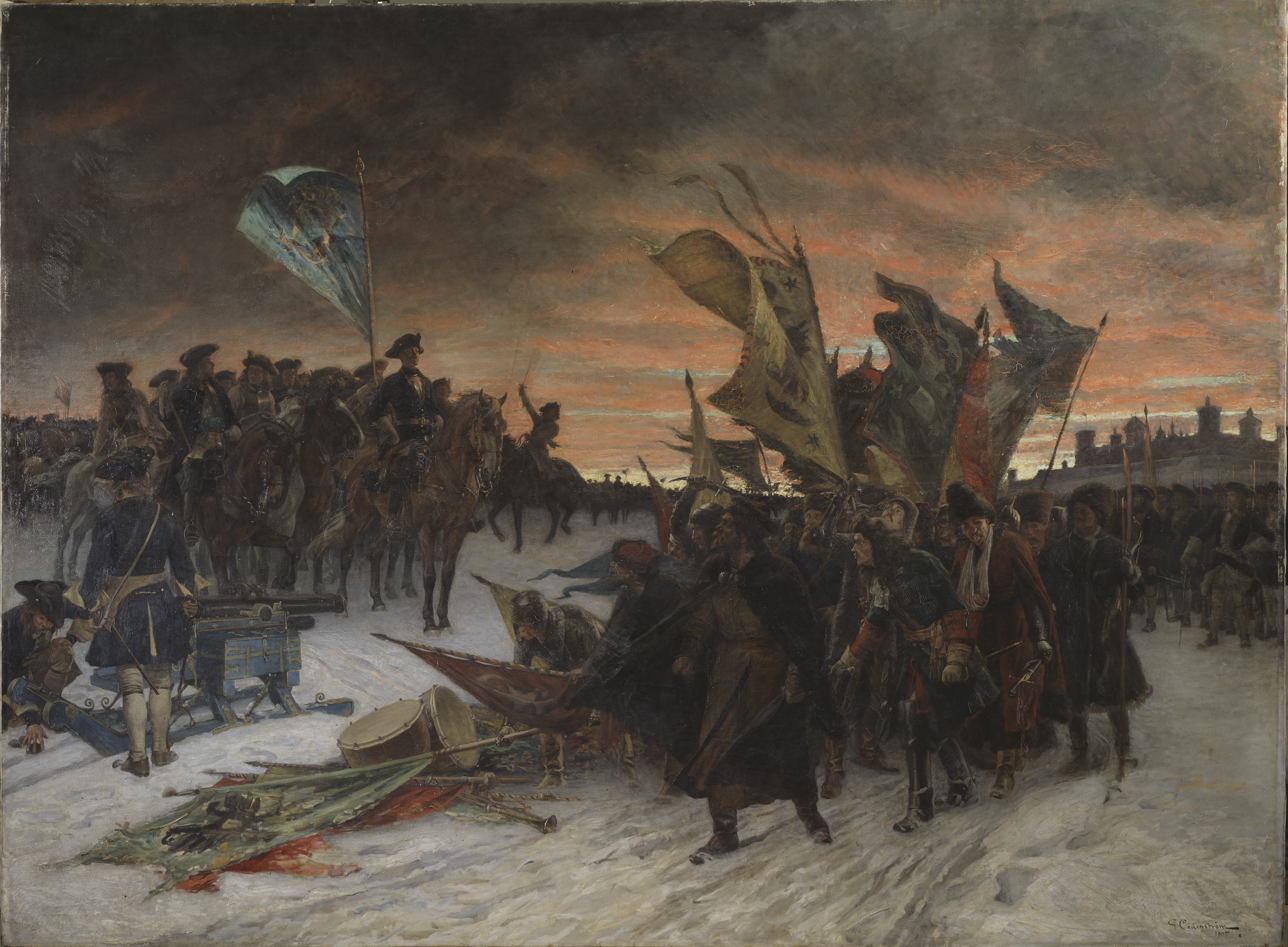
Victory at Narva (Gustaf Cederström, 1905)

In 1700 the three powers attacked and for Sweden the difficulty of a three front war had to be faced. No one expected what followed. The early part of the war consisted of a continual string of Swedish victories under Charles XII. Denmark was defeated in the summer of 1700 and withdrew until 1709. Russia suffered a defeat in the Battle of Narva in November, but regained the offensive and the city of St. Petersburg was founded between 1703 and 1707. Then Charles XII defeated Augustus the Strong in 1706-07, temporarily deposing him from the Polish throne.

=== In Norway ===
Frederick IV of Denmark and Norway distrusted the nobility and gentry and surrounded himself with ministers and advisers of humble origin. The one exception was the king's half-brother, Ulrich Christian Gyldenløve, who at the age of 24 was General-Admiral and Commander in Chief of the Navy. Frederick toured Norway in 1704 to assess the condition of his army and his second kingdom. In the morning, at the noon stop, and in the evenings the king held audiences with all who wanted to speak to him, from wealthy landowners to lowly peasants.

== Battle of Poltava ==
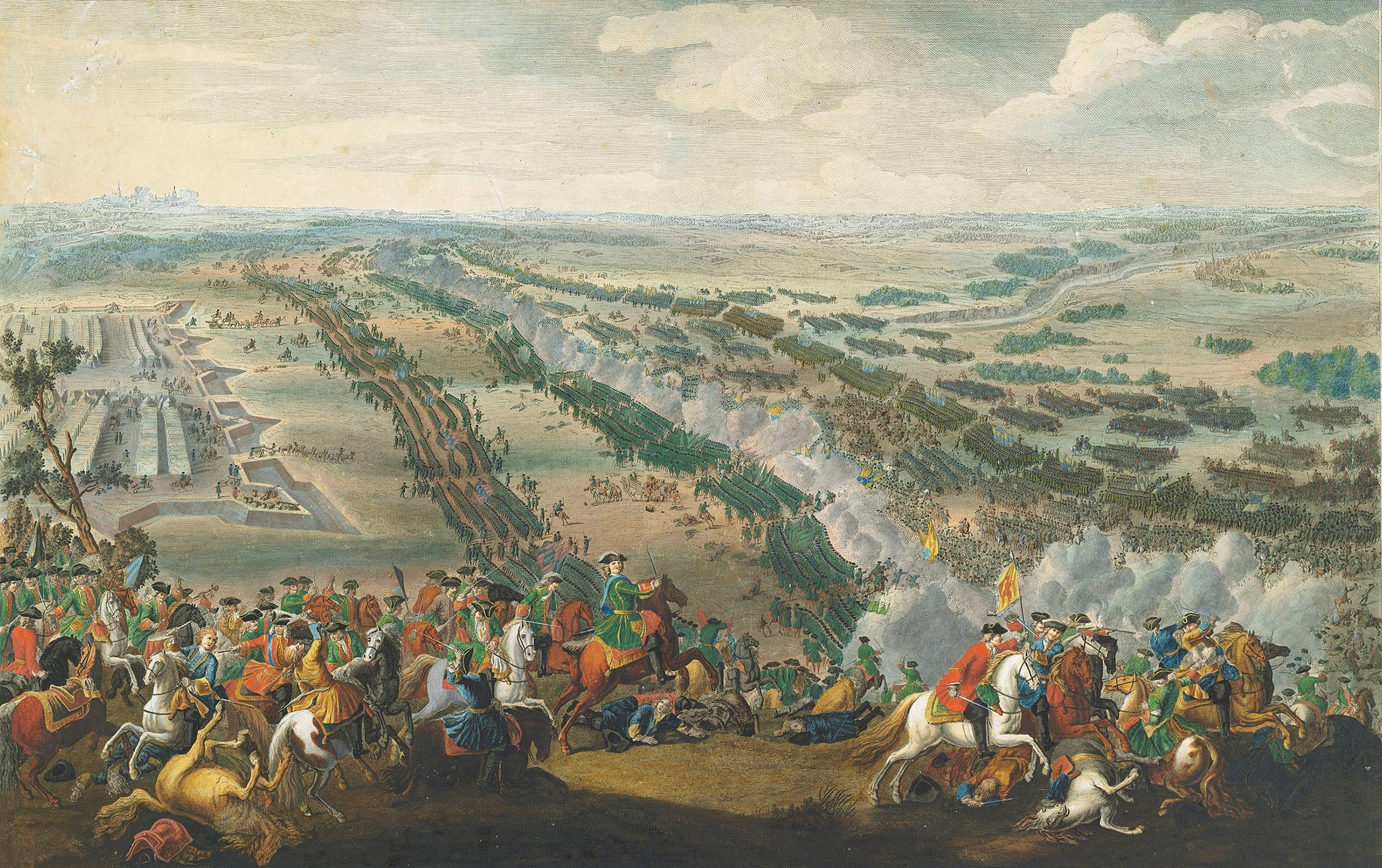
Battle of Poltava (Pierre-Denis Martin, 1726)

Charles XII was defeated by Peter in the Battle of Poltava (located in modern day Ukraine) in June 1709, and his army was virtually annihilated. He fled to the Ottoman Empire and spent five years in exile there.

== On the Western Front ==
In November 1709 Denmark invaded Skåne and Count Magnus Stenbock, charged with the defense of Sweden, succeeded in defeating Denmark at the Battle of Helsingborg in 1710. Meanwhile Russia captured Livonia and Estonia in the east. Despite another Swedish victory over the Danes at Gadebusch in December 1712, Stenbock's army was forced to surrender of the fortress of Tönning in May 1713.

=== In Norway ===
During September 1709 Norwegian forces were ordered to mobilise, and by the end of October 6,000 men were assembled on the Swedish border at Svinesund while 1,500 were congregated near the border at Kongsvinger Fortress.

In August, 1710 Baron Waldemar Løvendal returned in Norway as governor and commander of a country much drained in resources by the wars of the past century. The governor threw himself into building the civil and military leadership in the country just a short march from Sweden. When he left Norway in 1712, he had instituted reforms that served to create a civil service in Norway, and proceeded to document state activities to a degree never before seen in Norway, as well as being a strong military leader.

Baron Løvendal raised and equipped a Norwegian Army to invade and recapture the former Norwegian province of Bohuslän under the leadership of General-Lieutenant Caspar Herman Hausmann. In parallel he proposed a strong fleet to provide protection and transportation to seaward, and Frederick IV committed to providing such a force under Vice Admiral Sehested in June 1711. In August, the Norwegian army marched into Bohuslän, warmly welcomed by their former countrymen. But by late summer the fleet Vice Admiral Sehested's fleet had not appeared offshore, having been ordered by Frederick IV to return to Baltic waters. Without naval support, the Norwegian Army was forced to return to Norway.

In the autumn of 1711 the plague struck Denmark, and Copenhagen alone lost 70,000 occupants.

1712 was a disappointing year in Norway, as Frederick IV directed Løvendal not to use the Norwegian Army in offensive actions, reserving it for defense and for supplementing Danish troops elsewhere. General Hausmann was named head of all Norway's land and sea defenses.

=== Public rebellion ===
The taxations that followed from warfare and the forced mobilization of Norwegian farm boys led to uprising and riots in some parts of Norway. Among the most known cases are the farmer's tax rebellion in 1713 (Hallingdal), and a soldier's strike in 1720 (Telemark). In 1713, two leading farmers in Hallingdal spoke against the Danish authorities, demanding an end to war taxation, because the farmers could not bear the costs. Eventually, the tax collectors found doors shut all over the region, and had to call in a public meeting. The two leaders were tried and sentenced to labour in the fortress of Akershus. One of them, Elling Villand, who also was sentenced to give away his farm, was freed less than half a year later, and sat on his farm until he died.

In Telemark, Olav Olavsson Hovdejord a local sheriff and leading farmer stood up against the German captain in 1720, demanding an end to the forced mobilization of farmer's sons. At this point, Norwegians were tired of the war. The case was tried in favour of the farmer, Olav Hovdejord, and the captain was called back to Denmark for his coarse behaviour. He had at this point chopped Olav's right hand off for interfering.

== The Fall of Stralsund ==
Only the firmness of the chancellor, Count Arvid Horn, held Sweden in the war until Charles finally returned from the Ottoman Empire, arriving in Swedish held Stralsund in November 1714 on the south shore of the Baltic. Charles was by now at war with most of Northern Europe, and Stralsund was doomed. Charles remained there until December, 1715, escaping only days before Stralsund fell. By this point, Charles was considered mad by many, as he would not consider peace and the price Sweden had paid was already dear, with no hope in sight. All of Sweden's Baltic and German possessions were lost.

== The Norwegian Campaigns ==
=== The 1716 Campaign in Norway ===
Not one to consider peace, upon his return to Sweden Charles began gathering materials and men for another campaign, this time against Copenhagen, attacking across the frozen Øresund from Skåne. But the ice went out before he could launch his attack, so he redirected his focus. Charles XII chose then to invade Norway through Bohuslän. Getting intelligence of this intent, General Caspar Herman Hausmann warned Frederick IV, who didn’t believe the General and dismissed him summarily.

The Norwegian Army had been weakened in early 1716 by withdrawal of 5000 of the best troops to support the defense of Denmark; further, Norwegian commander-in-chief Barthold Heinrich von Lützow was not famous as a visionary leader. When rumors reached Christiania that Charles XII was preparing to invade, all remaining troops in Østerdal and Gudbrandsdal were ordered to the border at Halden and Fredrikstad. The Norwegians anticipated attack from Sweden might occur at Kongsvinger, Basmo or Halden. It was Basmo where Charles XII struck, crossing the border and establishing his headquarters at the Høland parsonage on March 8, 1716. The Norwegian commander of the district did not lack courage, and without waiting for his full forces to assemble, he attacked Charles’ superior forces with only 200 dragoons, fighting valiantly but suffered serious losses including his own capture.

Upon hearing of this defeat, General Lützow withdrew his forward troops and established a defensive position at Christiania. The Swedish forces advanced and, leaving a greatly strengthened garrison in Akershus fortress at Christiania, on March 19 Lützow withdrew to Bragernes in Drammen. The Norwegian scorched earth policy and guerrilla raid interdiction of supply chains by the residents of Bohuslän denied Charles of supplies. Further, the Norwegian fortresses behind his lines threatened his retreat if he became seriously weakened in combat. Charles took the city of Christiania, but without heavy siege artillery was unable to take Akershus Fortress.

After a brief occupation of Christiania, Charles retraced his steps to the Norwegian fortresses in south-eastern Norway with the objective of capturing them, particularly Fredriksten. This would remove the threat at his back, and they were to serve as the base for his offensive later that year, as well as capture of the harbours at mouth of the Glomma river, which would allow him to land the necessary provisions for a successful siege of Akershus.

Charles' troops attempted to take Fredriksten by storm on July 4. His troops took the town after fierce fighting, but the citizens set fire to their homes and Charles, unable to take the fortress, was forced to retreat and await the arrival of heavy guns in the aftermath of the Battle of Dynekilen.

Commodore Johan Vibe of the Dano-Norwegian fleet off Bohuslän was charged with interdicting supplies. Peter Wessel, a Norwegian captain serving in the fleet had distinguished himself in numerous engagements off the coast of Swedish Pomerania. In the beginning of 1716 he was ennobled by Frederick IV under the name of Tordenskiold. Captain Peter Wessel Tordenskiold led a daring cutting-out raid at Dynekil Fjord in Bohuslän which captured or destroyed the entire Swedish transport fleet, and, more importantly, the Swedish supplies at Dynekilen. Running low on supplies, Charles retreated hastily across the Svinesund and burned his bridges behind him. By July 12, not a Swedish soldier remained in Norway. For this feat, Frederick IV promoted Tordenskiold to commodore. In October 1716 Commodore Tordenskjold was given charge of a North Sea Squadron and placed at the head of Norway's Sea Force over the protests of Baron Wedel, Norway's new general in chief.

=== The 1717 Norwegian Hiatus ===
Even with his defeat, Charles still planned to redeem himself by a Norwegian invasion. 1717 became a year of rebuilding for both sides. Action was limited to unsuccessful attacks by Commodore Tordenskjold's squadron on Gothenburg and Strömstad. As a result of the failures, Commodore Tordenskjold was relieved of command of the North Sea fleet.

=== The 1718 Campaign in Norway ===
Commodore Tordenskjold was reassigned to the Baltic Fleet, in command of the 64-gun ship of the line, Ebenezer. The North Sea fleet under Rear Admiral Andreas Rosenpalm pursued an unaggressive patrol strategy along the Bohuslän coast. With the Danish fleet diverted to the Baltic and the lightening of patrols from the North Sea fleet, throughout the summer of 1718, steady streams of supplies were carried up through the Bohuslän skerries and to the Norwegian border. Armaments emphasized the heavy guns, ammunition and supplies that would be necessary to take the strong border fortresses at Fredriksten in Fredrikshald. In the autumn of 1718 Charles again invaded Norway with an army of 36,000 men. He was killed while inspecting the front trenches of the siege-works against Fredriksten. This precipitated an immediate retreat of his war-weary forces back to Sweden, effectively terminating the Norwegian campaigns.

== Conclusion ==
The war was finally concluded in 1721. Sweden had lost almost all of her overseas holdings gained in the 17th century, and was no longer a major power. Russia took the Baltic territories, and from then on was the major power in the east. The balance of power between Sweden and Denmark-Norway was restored.
