= Charles XII of Sweden =

King of Sweden from 1697 to 1718

Charles XII
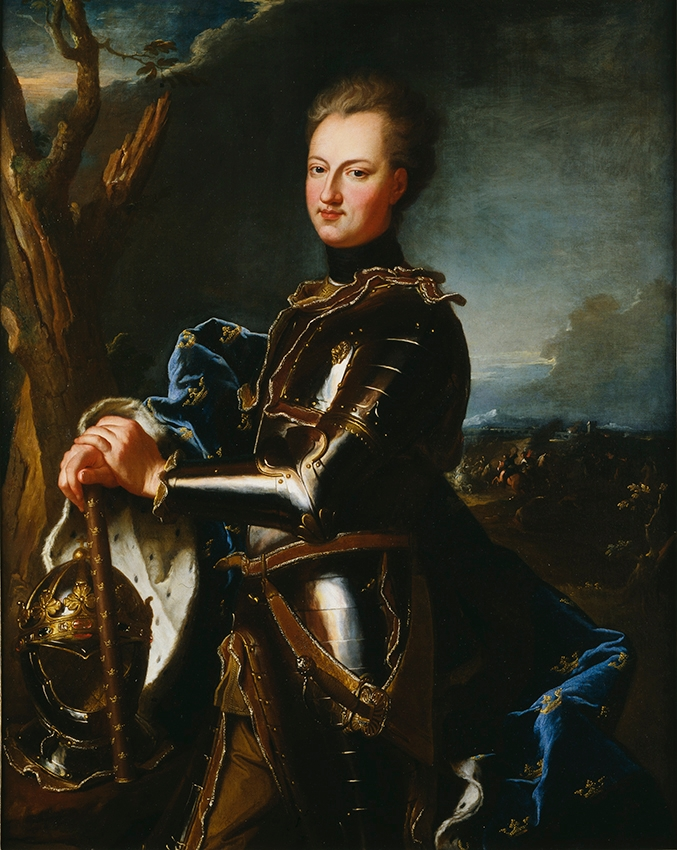
- Portrait by Hyacinthe Rigaud, c. 1715

King of Sweden
- Reign: 5 April 1697 – 30 November 1718 O.S.
- Coronation: 14 December 1697
- Predecessor: Charles XI
- Successor: Ulrika Eleonora
- Regent: Hedwig Eleonora of Holstein-Gottorp (5 April – 15 December 1697)
- Born: 17 June 1682; Tre Kronor, Stockholm, Sweden
- Died: 30 November 1718 (aged 36); Fredrikshald, Norway
- Burial: 26 February 1719; Riddarholmen Church, Stockholm
- House: Wittelsbach (Note: A member of the House of Palatinate-Zweibrücken (Kleeburg line))
- Father: Charles XI of Sweden
- Mother: Ulrika Eleonora of Denmark
- Religion: Lutheran
- Military career
- Allegiance: Sweden
- Branch: Swedish Army
- Conflicts: § Battles of Charles XII

Charles XII, (Note: Also known in Latin as Carolus Rex (lit. 'King Charles').) sometimes Carl XII (Swedish: Karl XII; 17 June 1682 – 30 November 1718 O.S.), was King of Sweden from 1697 to 1718. He belonged to the House of Palatinate-Zweibrücken, a branch line of the House of Wittelsbach. Charles was the only surviving son of Charles XI and Ulrika Eleonora the Elder. He assumed power, after a seven-month caretaker government, at the age of fifteen.

In 1700, a triple alliance of Denmark–Norway, Saxony–Poland–Lithuania and Russia launched a threefold attack on the Swedish protectorate of Holstein-Gottorp and provinces of Livonia and Ingria, aiming to take advantage of the Swedish Empire being unaligned and ruled by a young and inexperienced king, thus initiating the Great Northern War. Leading the Swedish army against the alliance, Charles won multiple victories despite being significantly outnumbered. A major victory over a much larger Russian army in 1700, at the Battle of Narva, compelled Peter the Great to sue for peace, an offer that Charles subsequently rejected. By 1706, Charles, now 24 years old, had forced all of his foes into submission. That year, Swedish forces under general Carl Gustav Rehnskiöld won a decisive victory over a combined army of Saxony and Russia at the Battle of Fraustadt. Russia was now the sole remaining hostile power.

Charles's subsequent march on Moscow experienced victory followed by victory, the most significant the Battle of Holowczyn where the smaller Swedish army routed a Russian army twice its size. The campaign ended with disaster when the Swedish army suffered heavy losses to a Russian force more than twice its size at Poltava. Charles had been incapacitated by a wound prior to the battle, rendering him unable to take active command. The defeat was followed by the Surrender at Perevolochna. Charles spent the following years in exile in the Ottoman Empire before returning to lead an assault on Norway, in a continuing attempt to remove the Danish king from the war and aim all his forces at the Russians. Two campaigns met with frustration and ultimate failure, concluding with his death at the Siege of Fredriksten in 1718. At the time, most of the Swedish Empire was under foreign military occupation, though Sweden itself was still free. This situation was later formalized, albeit moderated in the subsequent Treaty of Nystad. The result was the end of the Swedish Empire, and also of its effectively organized absolute monarchy and war machine, commencing a parliamentary government unique for continental Europe, which would last for half a century until royal autocracy was restored by Gustav III.

Charles was an exceptionally skilled military leader and tactician as well as an able politician, credited with introducing important tax and legal reforms. As for his famous reluctance towards peace efforts, he is quoted by Voltaire as saying upon the outbreak of the war: "I have resolved never to start an unjust war but never to end a legitimate one except by defeating my enemies". With the war consuming more than half his life and nearly all his reign, he never married and fathered no children. He was succeeded by his sister Ulrika Eleonora, who in turn was coerced to hand over all substantial powers to the Riksdag of the Estates and opted to surrender the throne to her husband Friedrich of Hesse-Kassel, who became King Frederick I of Sweden.

== Royal title ==
Coat of Arms of the House of Palatinate-Zweibrücken

His title in full as the king of Sweden was as follows:

We Charles, by the Grace of God, King of Sweden, the Goths and the Wends, Grand Prince of Finland, Duke of Scania, Estonia, Livonia, Karelia, Bremen, Verden, Stettin-Pomerania, Kashubia and Wenden, Prince of Rügen, Lord of Ingria and Wismar; as well as Count Palatine of the Rhine, Duke in Bavaria, of Jülich, Cleves and Berg.

The fact that Charles was crowned as Charles XII does not mean that he was the twelfth king of Sweden by that name. Swedish kings Erik XIV (r. 1560–1568) and Charles IX (r. 1604–1611) gave themselves numerals after studying a mythological history of Sweden. He was actually the sixth King Charles.

== Early life ==
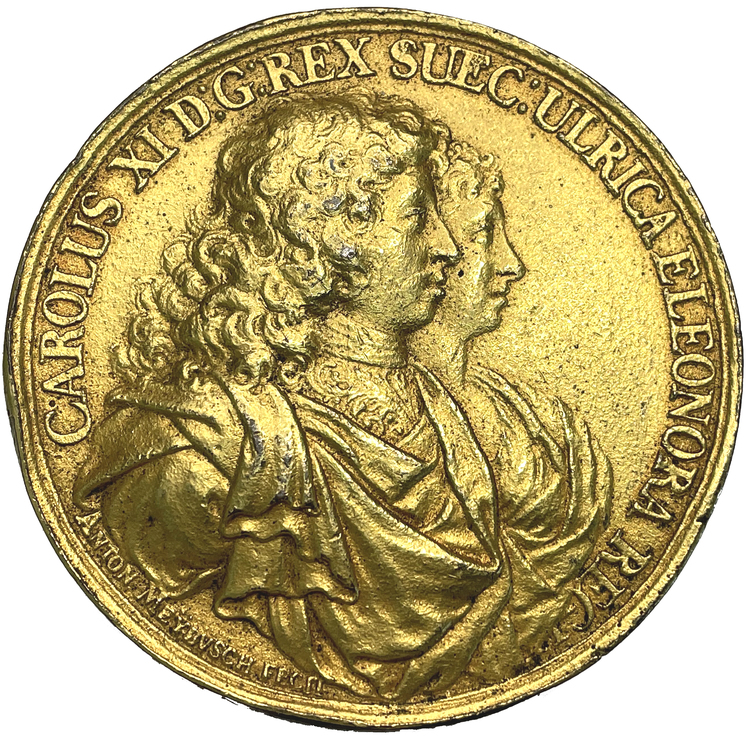
Charles's parents King Charles XI and Queen Ulrika Eleonora

Prince Charles of Sweden was born on 17 June 1682 O.S. in the royal castle of Tre Kronor in Stockholm. He was the first son born to King Charles XI of Sweden and his wife, the Danish princess Ulrika Eleonora. He had an older sister, Hedvig Sophia, born in 1681. He spent more time with his parents than would be typical in a European royal court of the time and traveled with them from a very early age. Four more sons were born to the royal couple in the years following Charles's birth: Gustav in 1683, Ulrik in 1684, Frederick in 1685, and Charles Gustavus in 1686. However, all of these four died in infancy. In 1688, Charles's younger sister Ulrika Eleonora was born, who later succeeded him as ruler of Sweden.

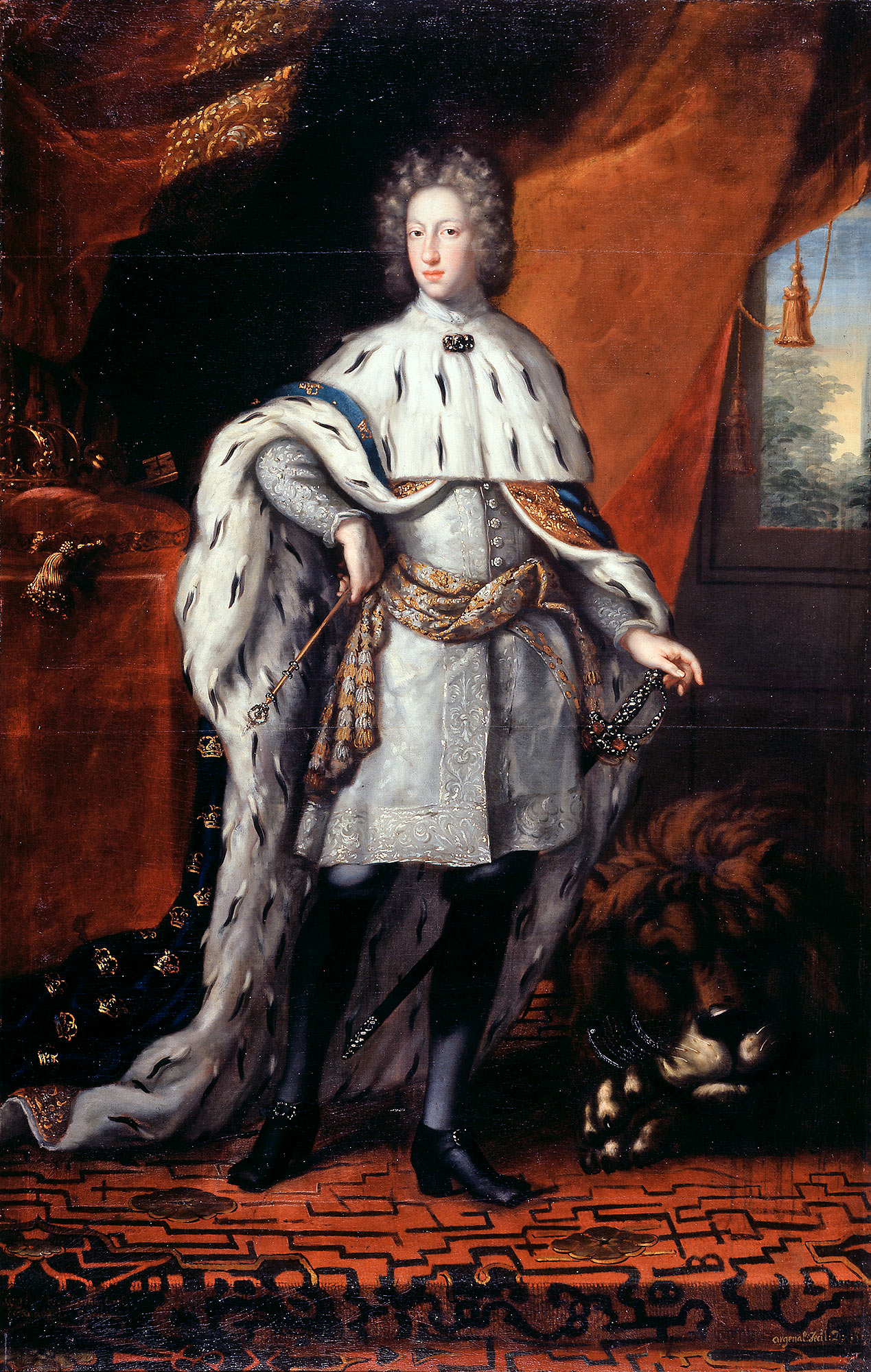
The 15-year-old Charles in 1697 as king of the Swedish Empire, painting belonging to the workshop of David Klöcker Ehrenstrahl

In 1693, Charles's mother died, and his father found consolation in spending more time with his son and heir. Charles XI brought his son with him to inspections and on other official business. Charles received an excellent education and was conscientiously prepared for the throne. He learned to ride by the age of four and engaged in rigorous physical training in his adolescence. He was very strong-willed and as king often stubbornly stuck to the standards which had been instilled in him by his moral and religious education. In April 1697, Charles XI died, and Prince Charles ascended the Swedish throne. Charles XI had provided for a regency for his teenaged heir, but already in November 1697 the Riksdag (Sweden's assembly of the Estates) recognized the fifteen-year-old Charles's majority. Charles XII was the first (and the last) Swedish ruler to inherit absolute monarchical authority from his predecessor.

== Great Northern War ==
=== Early campaigns ===
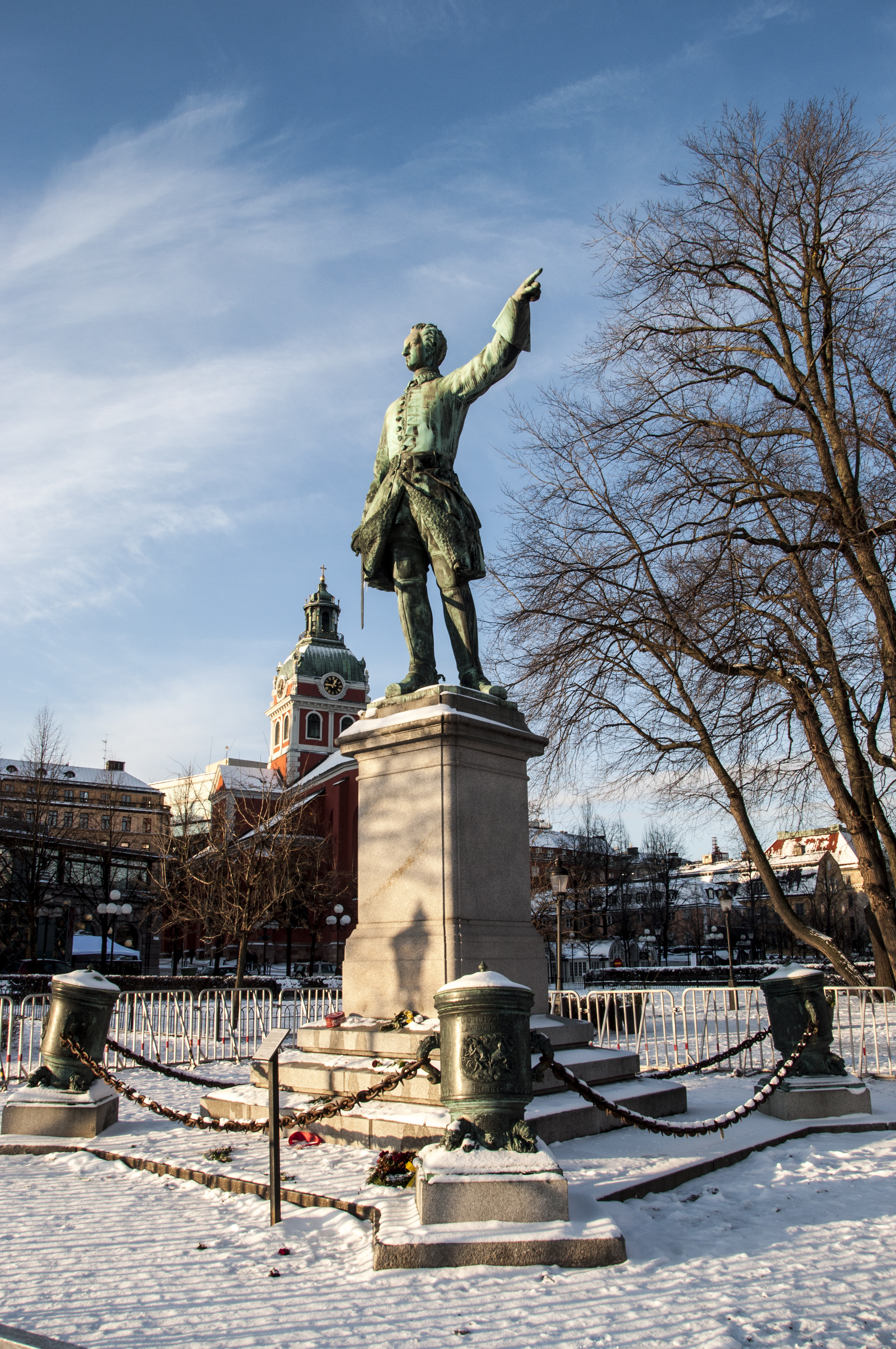
Monument to Charles XII in Stockholm, with Charles pointing towards Russia. Stockholmers call this statue "the lion among four pots" ("Lejonet mellan fyra krukor") referring to the mortars. This contrasts with a nearby statue of Charles XIII, which has lions similarly arranged; that statue is known as "the pot among four lions" ("Krukan mellan fyra lejon").

Around 1700, the monarchs of Denmark–Norway, Saxony (ruled by elector August II of Poland, who was also the king of Poland-Lithuania) and Russia united in an alliance against Sweden, mainly through the efforts of Johann Reinhold Patkul, a Livonian nobleman who turned traitor when the "great reduction" of Charles XI in 1680 stripped much of the nobility of lands and properties. In late 1699, Charles sent a minor detachment to reinforce his brother-in-law Duke Frederick IV of Holstein-Gottorp, who was attacked by Danish forces the following year. A Saxon army simultaneously invaded Swedish Livonia, and in February 1700 surrounded Riga, the most populous city of the Swedish Empire. Russia also declared war (August 1700), but stopped short of an attack on Swedish Ingria until September 1700.

Charles's first campaign was against Denmark–Norway, ruled by his cousin Frederick IV of Denmark. For this campaign Charles secured the support of England and the Netherlands, both maritime powers concerned with Denmark's threats to close the Sound. Leading a force of 8,000 and 43 ships in an invasion of Zealand, Charles rapidly compelled the Danes to submit to the Peace of Travendal in August 1700, which indemnified Holstein. Having forced Denmark–Norway to make peace within months, King Charles turned his attention upon the two other powerful neighbors, King August II (cousin to both Charles XII and Frederick IV of Denmark–Norway) and Peter the Great of Russia, who also had entered the war against him, ironically on the same day that Denmark came to terms.

Russia had opened their part of the war by invading the Swedish-held territories of Livonia and Estonia. Charles countered this by attacking the Russian besiegers at the Battle of Narva (November 1700). The Russians outnumbered the Swedish army of ten thousand men by almost four to one. Charles attacked under cover of a blizzard, effectively splitting the Russian army in two and won the battle. Many of Peter's troops who fled the battlefield drowned in the Narva River. The total number of Russian fatalities reached about 10,000 at the end of the battle, while the Swedish forces lost 667 men.

Charles did not pursue the Russian army. Instead, he turned against Poland-Lithuania, which was formally neutral at this point, thereby disregarding Polish negotiation proposals supported by the Swedish parliament. Charles defeated the Polish king Augustus II and his Saxon allies at the Battle of Kliszow in 1702 and captured many cities of the Commonwealth. After the deposition of Augustus as king of the Polish–Lithuanian Commonwealth, Charles XII put Stanisław Leszczyński as his puppet on the Polish throne (1704).

=== Russian resurgence ===
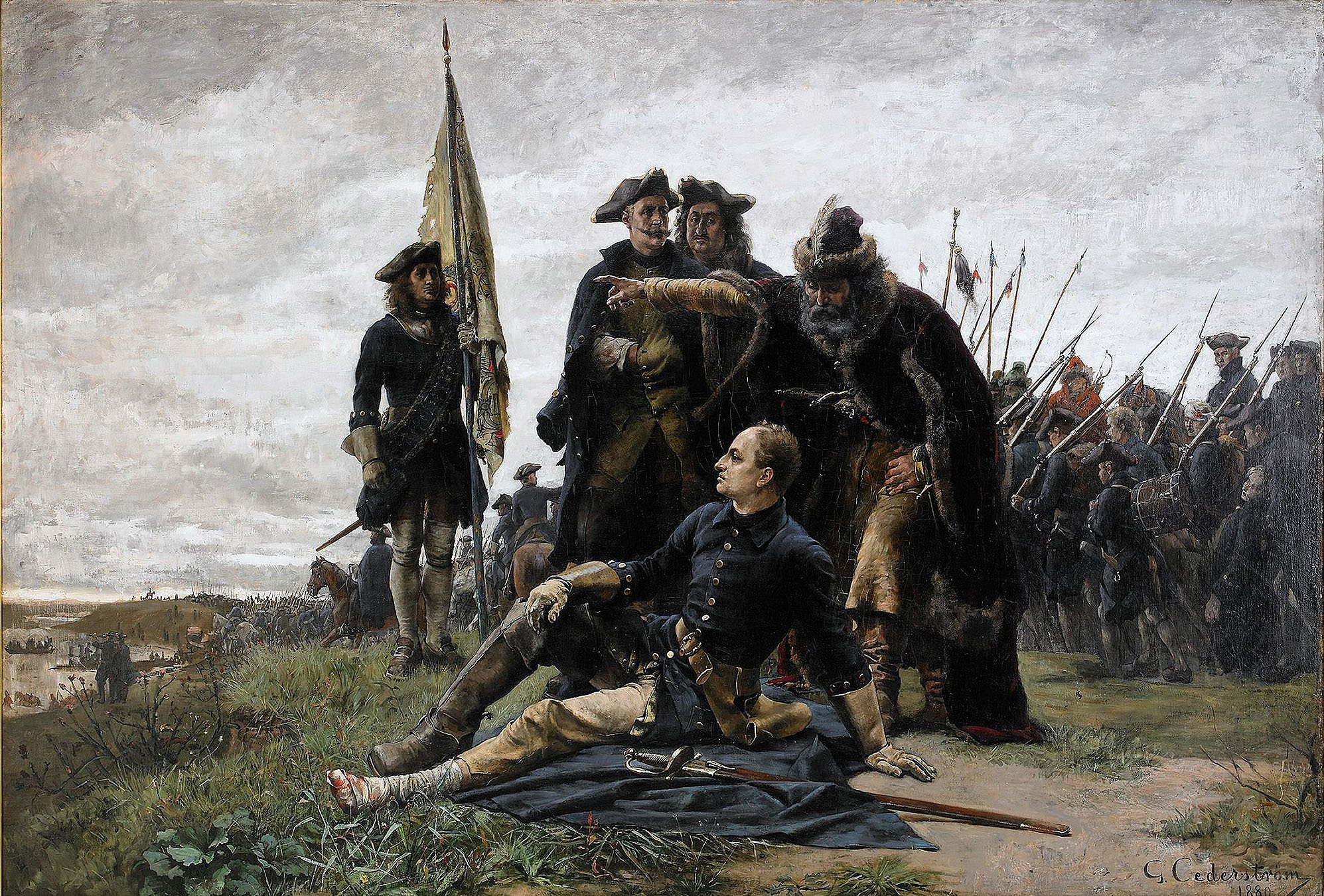
Charles XII and Ivan Mazepa at the Dnieper River after Poltava by Gustaf Cederström

While Charles won several decisive battles in the Commonwealth and ultimately secured the coronation of his ally Stanisław Leszczyński and the surrender of Saxony, the Russian Tsar Peter the Great embarked on a military reform plan that improved the Russian army, using the effectively organized Swedes and other European armies as role models. Russian forces managed to penetrate Ingria, where they established a new city, Saint Petersburg. Charles planned an invasion of the Russian heartland, allying himself with Ivan Mazepa, Hetman of the Ukrainian Cossacks. The size of the invading Swedish army was peeled off as Charles left Leszczyński with some 24,000 German and Polish troops, departing eastwards from Saxony in late 1707 with some 35,000 men, adding a further 12,500 under Adam Ludwig Lewenhaupt marching from Livonia. Charles left the homeland with a defense force of approximately 28,800 men, with a further 14,000 in Swedish Finland, as well as other garrisons in the Baltic and German provinces.

After securing his "favorite" victory in the Battle of Holowczyn, despite being outnumbered over three to one by the new Russian army, Charles opted to march eastwards on Moscow rather than try to seize Saint Petersburg, founded from the Swedish town of Nyenskans five years earlier. Peter the Great managed, however, to ambush Lewenhaupt's army at Lesnaya before Charles could combine his forces, thus losing valuable supplies, artillery and half of Lewenhaupt's men. Charles's Polish ally, Stanisław Leszczyński, was facing internal problems of his own. Charles expected the support of a massive Cossack rebellion led by Mazepa in Ukraine, with estimates suggesting Mazepa was able to muster about 40,000 troops. However, the Russians subjugated the rebellion and destroyed its capital, Baturin, before the arrival of the Swedish troops. The harsh climate took its toll as well, because Charles marched his troops to winter camp in Ukraine.

By the time of the decisive Battle of Poltava, in July 1709, Charles had been wounded, one-third of his infantry was dead, and his supply train had been destroyed. The king was incapacitated by a gunshot wound to the foot and was unable to lead the Swedish forces. With the numbers of Charles's army reduced to some 23,000, with many wounded or involved on the siege of Poltava, his general Carl Gustav Rehnskiöld had a clearly inferior force to face the fortified and modernized army of Tsar Peter, with some 45,000 men. The Swedish assault ended in disaster, and the king fled south to the Ottoman Empire with a small entourage, and set up camp at Bender with some 1,000 of his Caroleans ("Karoliner" in Swedish). The remainder of the army at Perevolochna would under Lewenhaupt's command surrender; many including Lewenhaupt would live out their lives in Russian captivity.

The Swedish defeat at Poltava marked the downfall of the Swedish Empire, as well as the founding of the Russian Empire.

=== Exile in the Ottoman Empire ===
Royal Monogram

The Ottomans initially welcomed the Swedish king when he went to Abdurrahman Pasha, commander of Özü Castle, as he was about to fall into the hands of the Russian army, and he was able to take refuge in the castle at the last moment. Afterward, he settled in Bender at the invitation of its governor, Ağa Yusuf Pasha.

In the meantime, Charles sent Stanisław Poniatowski and Thomas Funck as his messengers to Constantinople. They managed to indirectly contact Gülnuş Sultan, mother of Sultan Ahmed III, who became intrigued by Charles, and took an interest in his cause, and even corresponded with him in Bender.

During his stay in the Ottoman Empire, Charles earned the nickname demirbaş (literally "iron-head"). This word can mean stubborn or persistent, and it is usually assumed that this is why the Turks called Charles by this nickname. However, the term demirbaş commonly referred to state-owned articles in general and the furniture, equipment, etc. in state offices in particular. Thus, the nickname may be an ironic reference to Charles's visits to Ottoman government offices over a prolonged period.

Eventually, a small village named Karlstad (Varnița) had to be built near Bender to accommodate the ever-growing Swedish population there.

Gülnuş Sultan convinced her son to declare war against Russia, as she thought that Charles was a man worth taking a risk for. Later on, the Ottomans and Russians signed the Treaty of the Pruth and Treaty of Adrianople to end the hostilities between them. The treaties dissatisfied the pro-war party supported by King Charles and Stanislaw Poniatowski, who failed to reignite the conflict.

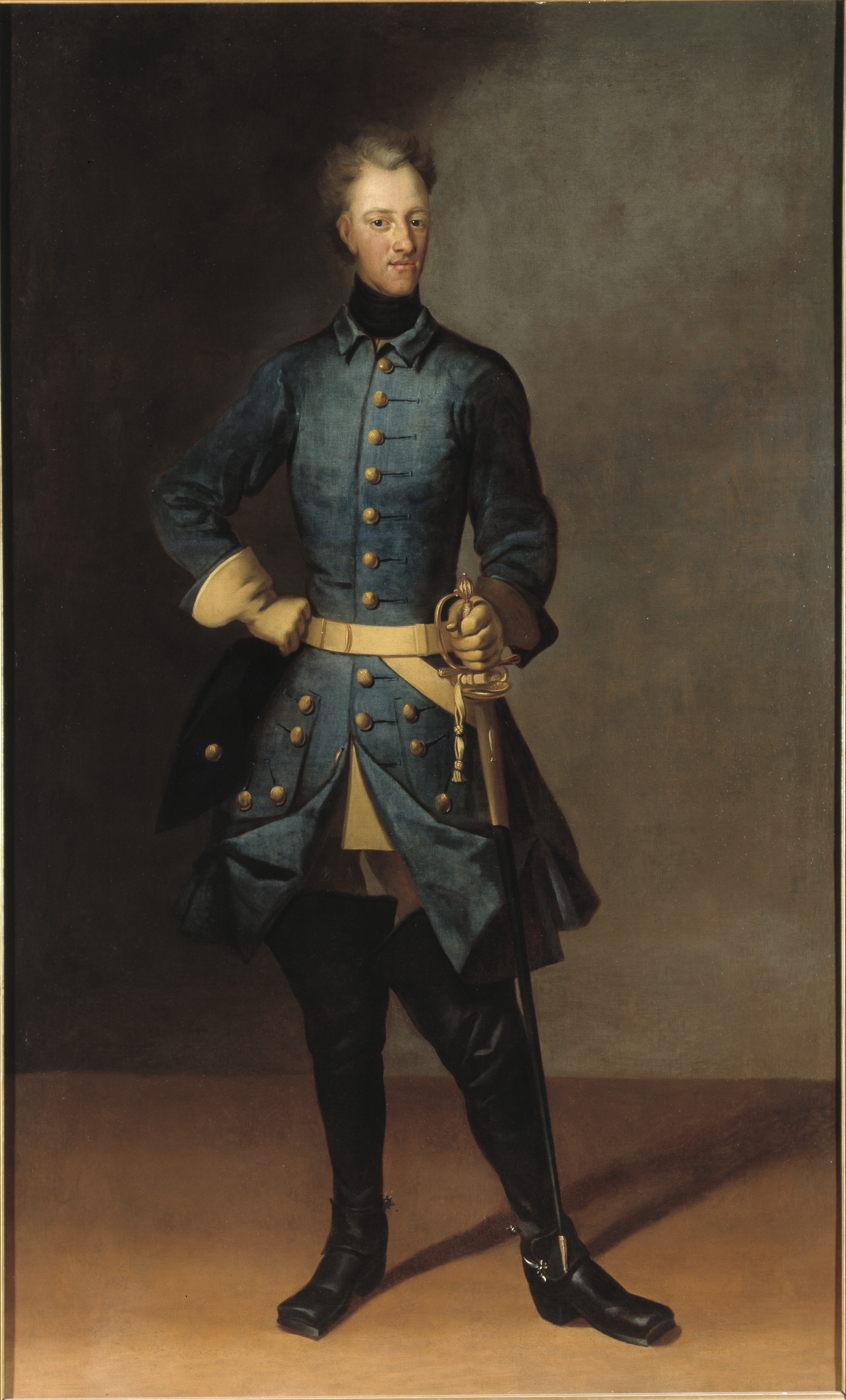
Portrait of Charles XII by David von Krafft, 1707.

Charles XII at Altranstädt, 1707; copy by David von Krafft after Johan David Swartz.

However, the Sultan Ahmed III's subjects in the empire eventually got tired of Charles's scheming. His entourage also accumulated huge debts with Bender merchants. Eventually, "crowds" of townspeople attacked the Swedish colony at Bender and Charles had to defend himself against the mobs and the Ottoman janissaries involved. This uprising was called kalabalık (Turkish for crowd) which afterward found a place in Swedish lexicon referring to a ruckus. The janissaries did not shoot Charles during the skirmish at Bender, but captured him and put him under house-arrest at Dimetoka (nowadays Didimoticho) and Constantinople. During his semi-imprisonment the King played chess and studied the Ottoman Navy and the naval architecture of the Ottoman galleons. His sketches and designs eventually led to the famous Swedish war ships Jarramas (Yaramaz) and Jilderim (Yıldırım).

Meanwhile, Russia and Poland regained and expanded their borders. Great Britain, an adversary of Sweden, defected from its alliance obligations while Prussia attacked Swedish holdings in Germany. Russia occupied Finland (the Greater Wrath 1713–1721). After defeats of the Swedish army, consisting mainly of Finnish troops in the Battle of Helsinki (1713), the Battle of Pälkäne 1713 and the Battle of Storkyro 1714, the military, administration and clergymen escaped from Finland, which fell under Russian military regime.

During his five-year stay in the Ottoman Empire, Charles XII corresponded with his sister (and eventual successor), Ulrika Eleonora. According to Ragnhild Marie Hatton, a Norwegian-British historian, in some of those letters Charles expressed his desire for a peace treaty which would be defensible in the future Swedish generations' eyes. However, he emphasized that only a greater respect for Sweden in Europe would enable him to achieve such a peace treaty. Meanwhile, the Swedish Council of State (government) and Estates/Diet (Parliament) tried to keep the beleaguered Sweden somehow organized and independent. Eventually, in the autumn of 1714, their warning letter reached him. In it, those executive and legislative bodies told the absentee King that unless he quickly returned to Sweden, they would independently conclude an achievable peace treaty with Russia, Poland and Denmark. This stark admonition prompted Charles to rush back to Sweden.

Charles traveled back to Sweden with a group of Ottomans, soldiers such as escorts and businessmen to whom he promised to repay his debts during his stay in the Ottoman Empire, but they had to wait several years before that happened. According to the prevailing church law in Sweden at that time, all who lived in the country, but were not members of the Swedish state church, would be baptized. In order for the Jewish and Muslim creditors to avoid this, Charles wrote a "free letter" so that they could practice their religions without being punished. The soldiers chose to remain in Sweden instead of making difficult trips home. They were called "Askersson" (the word asker in Turkish means soldier). However, there are accounts implying that following the long stay for Charles to repay his debts, they got paid and left the country.

=== Pomerania and Norway ===
Uniform worn by Charles XII in Frederikshall on 30 November 1718. Shown in The Royal Armoury in Stockholm.

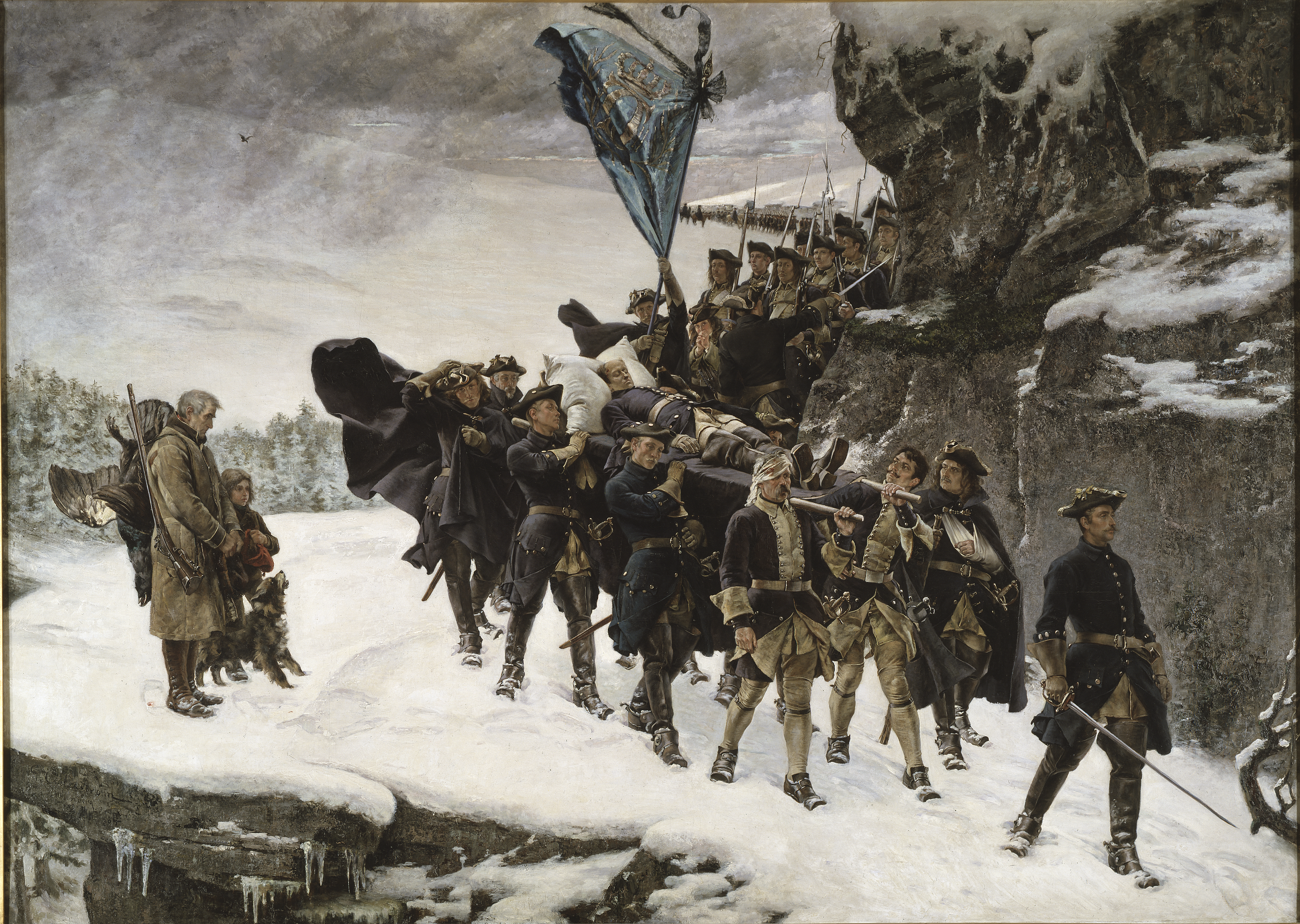
Bringing Home the Body of King Charles XII. A romanticized painting by Gustaf Cederström, 1884

Charles agreed to leave Constantinople and returned to Swedish Pomerania. He made the journey on horseback, riding across Europe in just fifteen days. He traveled across the Habsburg Kingdom of Hungary to Vienna and arrived at Stralsund. A medal with Charles on horseback, his long hair flying in the wind, was struck in 1714 to commemorate the speedy ride. It reads Was sorgt Ihr doch? Gott und Ich leben noch. ("What worries you so? God and I live still").

After five years away, Charles arrived in Sweden to find his homeland at war with Russia, Saxony, Hannover, Great Britain and Denmark. Sweden's western enemies attacked southern and western Sweden while Russian forces traveled across Finland to attack the Stockholm district. For the first time, Sweden found itself in a defensive war. Charles planned to attack Denmark by striking at its possessions in Norway. It was hoped that by cutting Denmark's Norwegian supply lines, the Danes would be compelled to withdraw forces for a possible invasion of Sweden itself.

Charles invaded Norway in 1716 with a combined force of 7,000 men. He occupied the capital of Christiania, (modern Oslo), and laid siege to the Akershus fortress there. Due to a lack of heavy siege cannons he was unable to dislodge the Norwegian forces inside. After suffering significant losses of men and materiel, Charles was forced to retreat from the capital on 29 April. In the following mid-May, Charles invaded again, this time striking the border town of Fredrikshald, now Halden, in an attempt to capture the fortress of Fredriksten. The attacking Swedes came under heavy cannon fire from the fortress and were forced to withdraw when the Norwegians set the town of Fredrikshald on fire. Swedish casualties in Fredrikshald were estimated at 500 men. While the siege at Fredrikshald was underway, the Swedish supply fleet was attacked and defeated by Tordenskjold in the Battle of Dynekilen.

In 1718, Charles once more invaded Norway. With a main force of 40,000 men, he again laid siege to the fortress of Fredriksten overlooking the town of Fredrikshald. Charles was shot in the head and killed during the siege, while he was inspecting trenches. The invasion was abandoned, and Charles's body was returned to Sweden. A second force, under Carl Gustaf Armfeldt, marched against Trondheim with 10,000 men but was forced to retreat. In the march that ensued, many of the 5,800 remaining men perished in a severe winter storm.

== Death ==
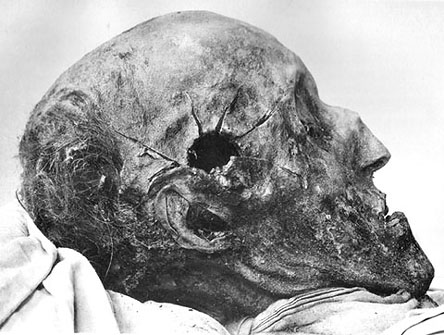
From the autopsy of Charles XII, July 1917

While in the trenches close to the perimeter of the fortress on 30 November (11 December New Style), 1718, Charles was struck in the head by a projectile and killed. The shot struck the left side of his skull and exited from the right. He died instantly.

The definitive circumstances around Charles's death remain unclear. Despite multiple investigations of the battlefield, Charles's skull and his clothes, it is not known where and when he was hit, or whether the shot came from the ranks of the enemy or from his own men. There are several hypotheses as to how Charles died, though none have strong enough evidence to be deemed true. Although there were many people around the king at the time of his death, there were no known witnesses to the actual moment he was hit. A likely explanation has been that Charles was killed by Dano-Norwegians as he was within reach of their guns. There are two possibilities that are usually cited: that he was killed by a musket shot, or that he was killed by grapeshot from the nearby fortress.

More theories claim he was assassinated: one is that the killer was a Swedish compatriot and asserts that enemy guns were not firing at the time Charles was struck. Suspects in this claim range from a nearby soldier tired of the siege and wanting to put an end to the war, to an assassin hired by Charles's own brother-in-law, who profited from the event by subsequently taking the throne himself as Frederick I of Sweden, that person being Frederick's aide-de-camp, André Sicre. Sicre confessed during what was claimed to be a state of delirium brought on by fever, but later recanted. Others suspect a plot to kill Charles by a group of wealthy Swedes who would benefit from blocking a 17% wealth tax that Charles intended to introduce. The Varberg Fortress museum displays a lead-filled brass button of Swedish origin that some claim was the projectile that killed the king.

Another odd account of Charles's death comes from Finnish writer Carl Nordling, who states that the king's surgeon, Melchior Neumann, dreamed the king had told him that he was not shot from the fortress but from "one who came creeping".

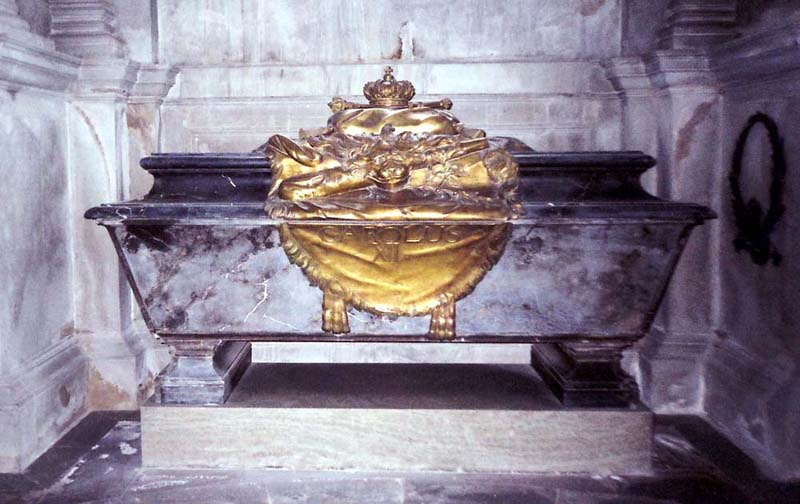
Charles XII's sarcophagus in Riddarholmen Church, Stockholm

Charles's body has been exhumed on three occasions to ascertain the cause of death; in 1746, 1859 and 1917. The 1859 exhumation found that the wound was in accordance with a shot from the Norwegian fort. In 1917, his head was photographed and x-rayed. Peter Englund asserted in his essay "On the death of Charles XII and other murders" that the mortal wound sustained by the King, with a smaller exit wound than entry wound, would be consistent with being hit by a bullet with a speed not exceeding 150 m/s, concluding that Charles was killed by stray grapeshot from the nearby fortress. A 2022 study by the University of Oulu and the University of Helsinki also found that iron grapeshot was likely to have killed the king, citing evidence from ballistic experiments as well as the absence of lead fragments in Charles's skull.

Charles was succeeded to the Swedish throne by his sister, Ulrika Eleonora. As his duchy of Palatine Zweibrücken required a male heir, Charles was succeeded as ruler there by his cousin Gustav Leopold. Georg Heinrich von Görtz, Charles's minister, was beheaded in 1719.

== Personal life ==
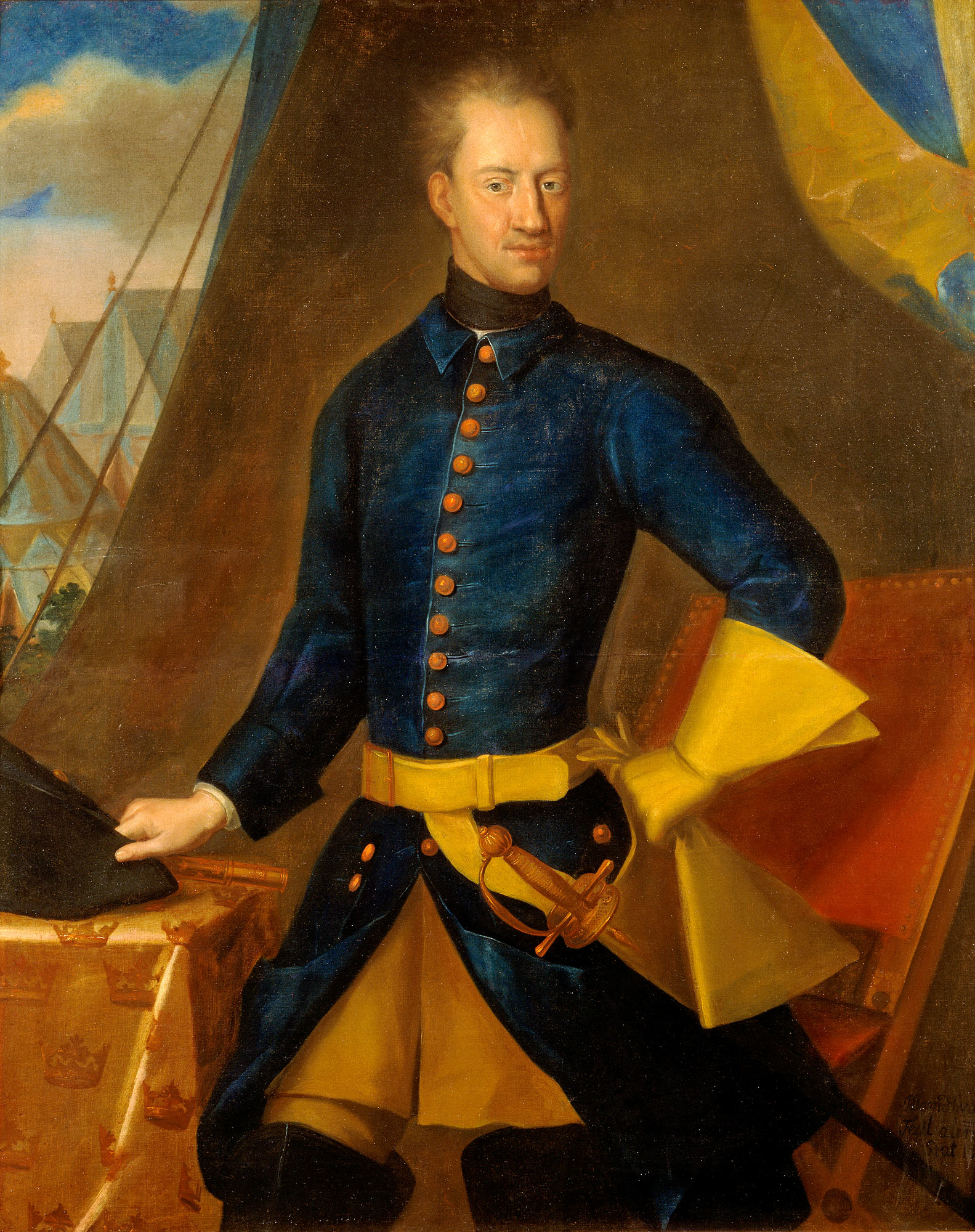
Portrait of King Charles XII (1706) by Johan David Schwartz

Charles never married and fathered no children of whom historians are aware. In his youth, he was particularly encouraged to find a suitable spouse in order to secure the succession, but he would frequently avoid the subject of sex and marriage. Possible candidates included Princess Sophia Hedwig of Denmark, Louisa Maria Stuart and Princess Maria Elisabeth of Holstein-Gottorp – but of the latter he pleaded that he could never wed someone "as ugly as Satan and with such a devilish big mouth". Instead, he made it clear that he would marry only someone of his own choice, and for love rather than dynastic pressures. His lack of mistresses may have been due to a strong religious faith. Charles himself suggested in conversation with Axel Löwen that he actively resisted any match until peace could be secured and was in some sense "married" to the military life. But that he was "chaste" occasioned speculation in his lifetime. Much later speculation that he was a hermaphrodite was quelled in 1917 when his coffin was opened and he was shown to have beard growth.

In his conversations with Löwen, he also stated that he did not lack taste for beautiful women, but that he held in his sexual desires for fear that they would get out of control if unchecked, and that if he committed to something like that, it would be forever. Some historians suggest that he resisted a marriage with Denmark which could have caused a family rift between those who dynastically favoured Holstein-Gottorp. Historians such as Blanning and Montefiore believe he was in fact homosexual. Certainly a letter from Reuterholm suggested that Charles had indicated a closeness to Prince Maximilian Emanuel of Württemberg-Winnental, whom Charles described as "very pretty". But writing in the 1960s, Hatton argues that Württemberg was very much heterosexual and the relationship is just as likely to have been that of teacher-pupil.

== Legacy ==
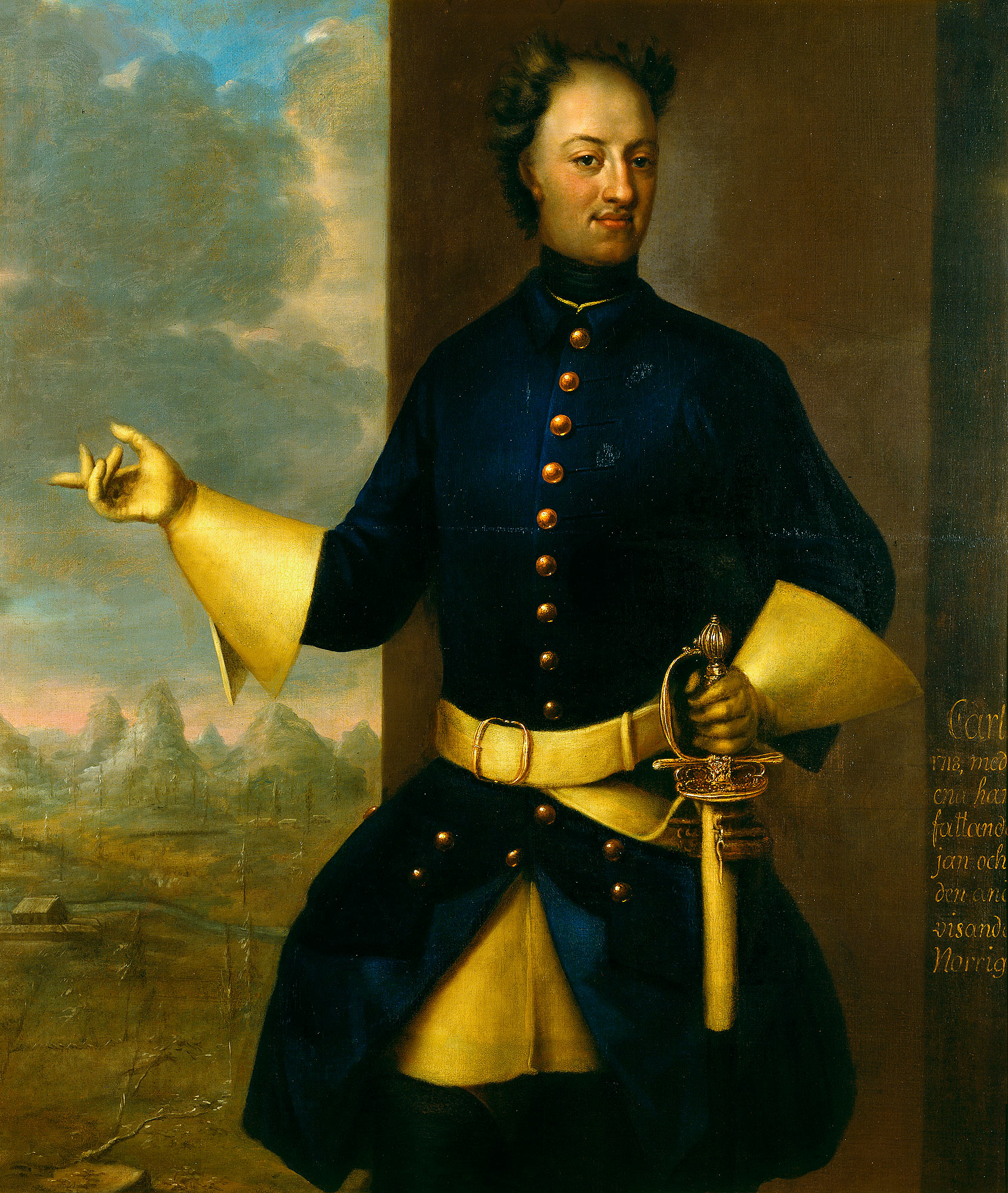
Portrait by Johann Heinrich Wedekind, 1719

Exceptional for abstaining from alcohol and sex, he felt most comfortable during warfare. Contemporaries report of his seemingly inhuman tolerance for pain and his utter lack of emotion. His brilliant campaigning and startling victories brought his country to the pinnacle of her prestige and power, although the Great Northern War resulted in Sweden's defeat and the end of the empire within years of his own death. In his youth, renowned Russian general Alexander Suvorov considered Charles XII his hero together with Julius Caesar. Like Charles XII, Suvorov adopted an aggressive style of tactics and campaigning, seemingly inspired by the Swedish king.

Charles's death marked the end of a period of autocratic kingship and absolutist rule in Sweden, and the subsequent Age of Liberty saw a shift of power from the monarch to the parliament of the estates. Historians of the late 18th and early 19th centuries viewed Charles's death as the result of an aristocratic plot, and Gustav IV Adolf, the king who refused to settle with Napoleon Bonaparte, "identified himself with Charles as a type of righteous man struggling with iniquity" (Roberts). Throughout the 19th century's romantic nationalism Charles XII was viewed as a national hero. He was idealized as a heroic, virtuous young warrior king, and his fight against Peter the Great was associated with the contemporary Swedish-Russian enmity. Examples of the romantic hero idolatry of Charles XII in several genres are Esaias Tegnér's song Kung Karl, den unge hjälte (1818), Johan Peter Molin's statue in Stockholm's Kungsträdgården (unveiled on 30 November 1868, the 150th anniversary of Charles's death) and Gustaf Cederström's painting Karl XII:s likfärd ("Funeral procession of Charles XII", 1878). The date of Charles's death was chosen by a student association in Lund for annual torch marches beginning in 1853.

In his 1901 play Karl XII, August Strindberg broke with the heroization practice by showing an introverted Charles XII in conflict with his impoverished subjects. In the so-called Strindberg feud (1910–1912), his response to the "Swedish cult of Charles XII" (Steene) was that Charles had been "Sweden's ruin, the great offender, a ruffian, the rowdies' idol, a counterfeiter." Verner von Heidenstam however, one of his opponents in the feud, in his book Karolinerna instead "emphasized the heroic steadfastness of the Swedish people in the somber years of trial during the long-drawn-out campaigns of Karl XII" (Scott).

In the 1930s, Swedish Nazis held celebrations on the date of Charles XII's death, and shortly before the outbreak of World War II, Adolf Hitler received from Sweden a sculpture of the king at his birthday. In the late 20th century, Swedish nationalists and neo-Nazis again used 30 November as a date for their ceremonies, which were regularly interrupted by larger counter-demonstrations, and abandoned.

=== Scientific contributions ===
Apart from being a monarch, the King's interests included mathematics, and anything that would be beneficial to his warlike purposes. He is credited with having invented an octal numeral system, as well as a more elaborate one with the base 64, which he considered more suitable for war purposes because all the boxes used for materials such as gunpowder were cubic. According to a report by contemporary scientist Emanuel Swedenborg, the King had sketched a model of his thoughts on a piece of paper and handed it to him at their meeting in Lund in 1716. The paper was reportedly still in existence a hundred years later but has since been lost.

=== Literature ===
Charles fascinated many in his time. In 1731, Voltaire wrote a biography of Charles XII, History of Charles XII. Voltaire portrays the Swedish king in a positive light, against the brutal nature of Peter the Great. The English man of letters Samuel Johnson wrote of Charles in his poem "The Vanity of Human Wishes":

On what Foundation stands the warrior's pride,

How just his hopes let Swedish Charles decide;
A frame of adamant, a soul of fire,
No dangers fright him, and no labours tire;
O'er love, o'er fear, extends his wide domain,
Unconquered lord of pleasure and of pain;
No joys to him pacific sceptres yield;
War sounds the trump, he rushes to the field;
Behold surrounding kings their power to combine,
And one capitulate, and one resign;
Peace courts his hand, but spreads her charms in vain;
"Think nothing gained", he cries, "till nought remain,
On Moscow's walls till Gothic standards fly,
And all be mine beneath the polar sky."
The march begins in military state,
And nations on his eye suspended wait;
Stern Famine guards the solitary coast,
And Winter barricades the realms of Frost;
He comes, not want and cold his course delay; -
Hide, blushing Glory, hide Pultowa's day:
The vanquished hero leaves his broken bands,
And shows his miseries in distant lands;
Condemned a needy supplicant to wait,
While ladies interpose, and slaves debate.
But did not Chance at length her error mend?
Did no subverted empire mark his end?
Did rival monarchs give the fatal wound?
Or hostile millions press him to the ground?
His fall was destined to a barren strand,
A petty fortress, and a dubious hand;
He left the name, at which the world grew pale,
To point a moral or adorn a tale.

Swedish author Frans G. Bengtsson and Professor Ragnhild Hatton have written biographies of Charles XII of Sweden.

In 1938, E. M. Almedingen wrote The Lion of the North: Charles XII, King of Sweden.

Charles XII figures quite prominently in Robert Massie's magnum opus Peter the Great.

== Ancestors ==
Ancestors of Charles XII of Sweden

8. John Casimir, Count Palatine of Zweibrücken-Kleeburg
4. Charles X Gustav of Sweden
9. Catharina of Sweden
2. Charles XI of Sweden
10. Frederick III, Duke of Holstein-Gottorp
5. Hedvig Eleonora of Holstein-Gottorp
11. Marie Elisabeth of Saxony
1. Charles XII of Sweden
12. Christian IV of Denmark
6. Frederick III of Denmark
13. Anne Catherine of Brandenburg
3. Ulrike Eleonora of Denmark
14. George, Duke of Brunswick-Lüneburg
7. Sophie Amalie of Brunswick-Lüneburg
15. Anne Eleonore of Hesse-Darmstadt

== In popular culture ==
He is referred to in the anime Legend of the Galactic Heroes as the Swedish Meteor; whose similarity to Reinhard von Lohengramm may portend the dynasty dying out without a successor.

August Strindberg's 1901 play Carl XII is about him.

The 1925 Swedish film Charles XII is a two-part silent epic starring Gösta Ekman the Elder portraying his reign.

In the 1968 Polish film Hrabina Cosel, Charles XII is portrayed by Daniel Olbrychski.

In the 1983 Swedish comedy film Kalabaliken i Bender, Charles XII is portrayed by Gösta Ekman the Younger.

In 2007, Charles XII was portrayed by Eduard Flerov in the Russian drama The Sovereign's Servant.

Charles XII appears in the absurdist comedy A Pigeon Sat on a Branch Reflecting on Existence (2014), in which his army passes a modern-day cafe on their way to, and retreating from, the Battle of Poltava. He is played by Viktor Gyllenberg.

The Swedish power metal band Sabaton wrote an album named after him, which includes several songs about his life.

George R. R. Martin has cited Charles XII as one of the inspirations for Robb Stark in his A Song of Ice and Fire series.

== Battles of Charles XII ==
| Denmark–Norway | Tsardom of Russia | Electorate of Saxony | Polish–Lithuanian Commonwealth | Cossack Hetmanate | Kalmyk Khanate | Ottoman Empire | Kingdom of Prussia |

| № | Date | Action | Type (Note: In this table, the following criteria applies: "Landing" refers to a contested amphibious operation; "skirmish" refers to a limited engagement, either by parts of an army or a smaller force, with minor strategic impact or losses; "battle" refers to a larger engagement in which one or both sides fights in battle-formation to defeat the other army, with considerable strategic impact or losses; "siege" refers to a contested fortification or larger settlement, where any attempts to storm were indecisive; "assault" refers to a contested or uncontested fortification or larger settlement, where an assault played the decisive role; "blockade" refers to an attacker's attempt to starve out the garrison of a fortification or larger settlement; "operation" refers to a pre-planned military operation to seize a larger area of strategic value, in which several minor engagements are fought.) | Location (Note: Contemporary location written at the top; present-day location written inside parentheses.) | Warring | Opponent/s | Outcome |
Danish–Holstein War of 1700
| 1. | 4 Aug 1700 | Humlebæk | Landing | Denmark–Norway (Denmark) | (Denmark–Norway) | Jens Rostgaard | Victory |
Baltic campaigns of 1700–1701
| 2. | 27 Nov 1700 | Pühhajoggi | Skirmish | Swedish Estonia (Estonia) | Oryol ship | Boris Sheremetev | Victory |
| 3. | 30 Nov 1700 | Narva | Battle | Swedish Estonia (Estonia) | Oryol ship | Charles de Croÿ | Victory |
| 4. | 19 Jul 1701 | Düna | Battle | Swedish Livonia (Latvia) | (Electorate of Saxony) | Adam von Steinau; Anikita Repnin | Victory |
Polish–Lithuanian campaigns of 1701–1706
| 5. | 15–16 Nov 1701 | Tryszki | Skirmish | Duchy of Lithuania (Lithuania) | | Grzegorz Ogiński | Victory |
| 6. | 19 Jul 1702 | Kliszów | Battle | Kingdom of Poland (Poland) | (Electorate of Saxony) | Augustus II; Adam von Steinau; Hieronim Lubomirski | Victory |
| 7. | 1 May 1703 | Pułtusk | Battle | Kingdom of Poland (Poland) | (Electorate of Saxony) | Adam von Steinau | Victory |
| 8. | 26 May – 14 October 1703 | Thorn | Siege | Kingdom of Poland (Poland) | (Electorate of Saxony) | Christoph von Kanitz | Victory |
| 9. | 6 Sep 1704 | Lemberg | Assault | Kingdom of Poland (Ukraine) | (Electorate of Saxony) | Franciszek Gałecki | Victory |
| 10. | 7 Nov 1704 | Poniec | Battle | Kingdom of Poland (Poland) | (Electorate of Saxony) | Johann von Schulenburg | Victory |
| 11. | 9 Nov 1704 | Oderbeltsch | Battle | Lower Silesia (Poland) | (Cossack Hetmanate) | Danylo Apostol | Victory |
| 12. | 26 Jan – 10 April 1706 | Grodno | Blockade | Duchy of Lithuania (Belarus) | Oryol ship | Georg von Ogilvy | Victory |
Russian invasion of 1708–1709
| 13. | 6–7 Feb 1708 | Grodno | Skirmish | Duchy of Lithuania (Belarus) | Oryol ship | Peter I | Victory |
| 14. | 14 Jul 1708 | Holowczyn | Battle | Duchy of Lithuania (Belarus) | (Cossack Hetmanate) (Kalmyk Khanate) | Boris Sheremetev | Victory |
| 15. | 10 Sep 1708 | Malatitze | Battle | Duchy of Lithuania (Belarus) | (Cossack Hetmanate) (Kalmyk Khanate) | Peter I Mikhail Golitsyn | Victory |
| 16. | 20 Sep 1708 | Rajovka | Skirmish | Duchy of Lithuania (Russia) | (Cossack Hetmanate) (Kalmyk Khanate) | Peter I Christian Bauer | Victory |
| 17. | 11–13 Nov 1708 | Desna | Operation | Cossack Hetmanate (Ukraine) | Oryol ship | Ludwig von Hallart | Victory |
| 18. | 17 Jan 1709 | Veprik | Assault | Cossack Hetmanate (Ukraine) | (Cossack Hetmanate) | William Fermor | Victory |
| 19. | 8 Feb 1709 | Oposhnya | Skirmish | Cossack Hetmanate (Ukraine) | (Cossack Hetmanate) | Otto von Schaumburg | Victory |
| 20. | 19 Feb 1709 | Khukhra | Skirmish | Tsardom of Russia (Ukraine) | Oryol ship | Unknown | Victory |
| 21. | 21 Feb 1709 | Krasnokutsk–Gorodnoye | Battle | Tsardom of Russia (Ukraine) | (Cossack Hetmanate) (Kalmyk Khanate) | Carl von Rönne | Victory |
| 22. | 8 Jul 1709 | Poltava | Battle | Cossack Hetmanate (Ukraine) | (Cossack Hetmanate) (Kalmyk Khanate) | Peter I Boris Sheremetev | Defeat |
Turkish exile in 1709–1714
| 23. | 31 Jan – 1 February 1713 | Bender | Assault | Ottoman Empire (Moldova) | | Ismail Pasha | Defeat |
German campaigns of 1714–1715
| 24. | 21–27 Apr 1715 | Usedom I | Operation | Swedish Pomerania (Germany / Poland) | (Kingdom of Prussia) | Captain Rohr | Victory |
| 25. | 31 Jul – 22 August 1715 | Usedom II | Operation | Swedish Pomerania (Germany / Poland) | (Kingdom of Prussia) (Electorate of Saxony) | Georg von Arnim; Louis of Württemberg-Winnental | Defeat |
| 26. | 12 Jul – 24 December 1715 | Stralsund | Siege | Swedish Pomerania (Germany) | (Kingdom of Prussia) (Electorate of Saxony) (Denmark–Norway) | Leopold of Anhalt-Dessau; August von Wackerbarth; Jobst von Scholten | Defeat |
| 27. | 16 Nov 1715 | Stresow | Battle | Swedish Pomerania (Germany) | (Kingdom of Prussia) (Denmark–Norway) (Electorate of Saxony) | Leopold of Anhalt-Dessau | Defeat |
Norwegian campaigns of 1716 and 1718
| 28. | 9 Mar 1716 | Høland | Skirmish | Denmark–Norway (Norway) | (Denmark–Norway) | Ulrik Kruse | Victory |
| 29. | 21 Mar 1716 | Christiania | Skirmish | Denmark–Norway (Norway) | (Denmark–Norway) | Jørgen von Klenow | Victory |
| 30. | 22 Mar – 30 April 1716 | Akershus Fortress | Siege | Denmark–Norway (Norway) | (Denmark–Norway) | Jørgen von Klenow | Defeat |
| 31. | 3–5 Jun 1716 | Sponvika Redoubt | Siege | Denmark–Norway (Norway) | (Denmark–Norway) | Hans Günter | Victory |
| 32. | 3–4 Jul 1716 | Fredrikshald | Assault | Denmark–Norway (Norway) | (Denmark–Norway) | Hans Brun | Defeat |
| 33. | 15 Jul – 16 November 1718 | Iddefjord | Operation | Denmark–Norway (Norway) | (Denmark–Norway) | Barthold Landsberg | Victory |
| 34. | 20 Nov – 14 December 1718 | Fredriksten | Siege | Denmark–Norway (Norway) | (Denmark–Norway) | Barthold Landsberg | Defeat † |

== See also ==
- List of unsolved murders
- Gottorp Fury

== Notes ==
Charles XII of Sweden House of Palatinate-Zweibrücken Cadet branch of the House of Wittelsbach Born: 17 June 1682 Died: 30 November 1718
Regnal titles
| Preceded by Charles XI | King of Sweden; Duke of Bremen and Verden; 1697–1718 | Succeeded by Ulrika Eleonora |
| Preceded by Charles XI | Duke of Palatine Zweibrücken; 1697–1718 | Succeeded by Gustav Samuel Leopold |
