= Basmo Fortress =

Fortification in Norway

Coordinates: 59°35′48.93″N 11°32′23.15″E

Basmo festning
- Marker, Norway
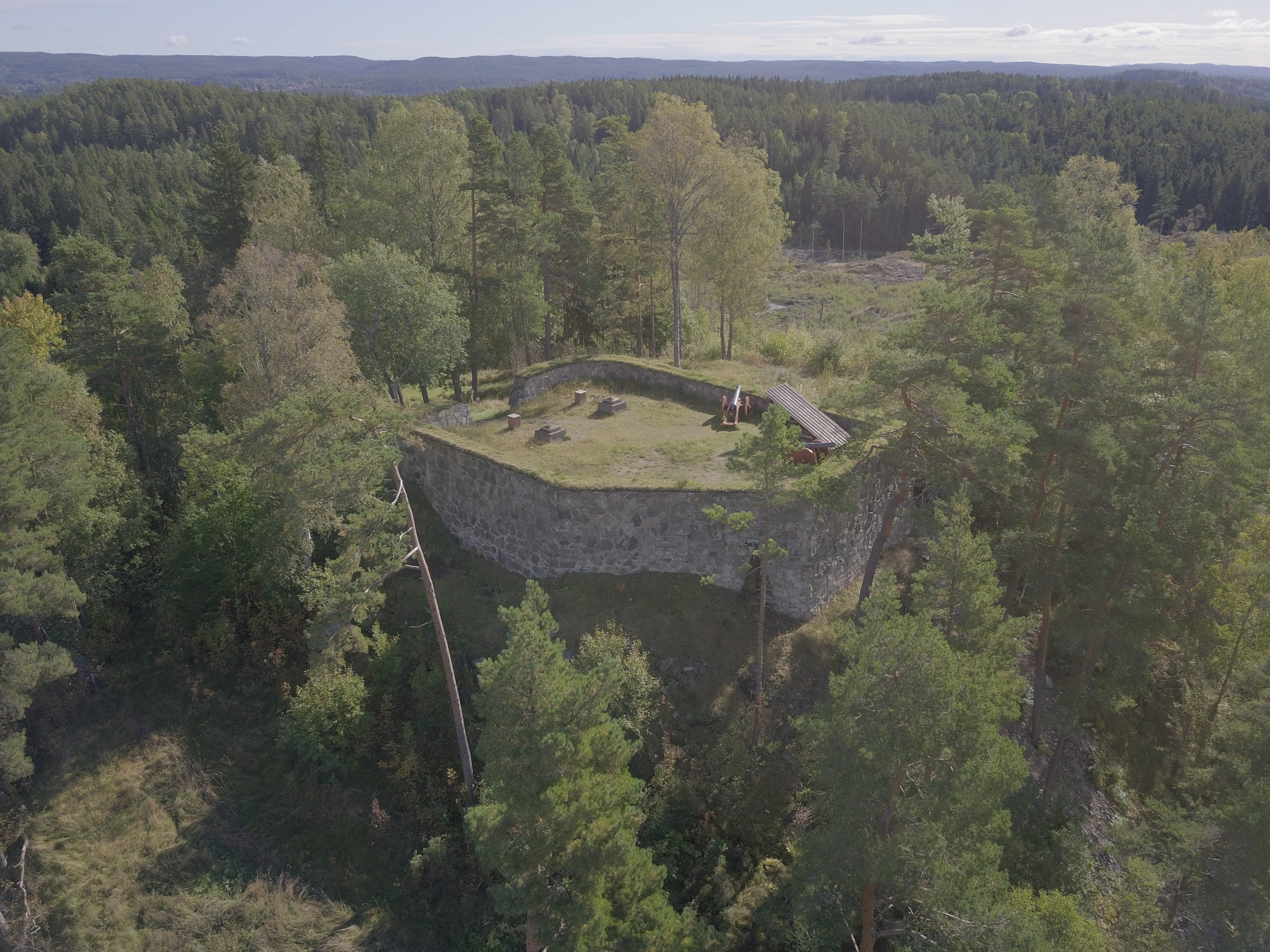
- Stone base of former tower

Site information
- Type: Land fortress
- Controlled by: Norway

Site history
- Built: 1680s
- In use: 1683-1745
- Materials: stone
- Battles/wars: Swedish invasion 1716; Swedish invasion 1718

Basmo fortress (Basmo festning) is a former fortification located in the north-western part of Marker municipality in Østfold county, Norway. The fortress was placed on the main road from Ørje. The site is situated near the Swedish border on an isolated mountain outcropping between lakes Rødenessjøen and Hemnessjøen.

It was constructed in the 1680s and saw 62 years of service. The first mention of this Norwegian fortress is in a letter from Field Marshal Gustav Wilhelm von Wedel-Jarlsberg, Count of Wedel-Jarlsberg to the King Christian V of Denmark in 1683. Major General Johan Caspar von Cicignon developed the plans. During the Great Northern War it was manned by up to 1,350 men.

On the night of March 9, 1716, the pyres on the mountaintops announced that Swedish King Charles XII had crossed the border with 1,000 men. Moving rapidly, he found the border poorly guarded and moved with cavalry to Høland parsonage. Norwegian troops stationed in the district were assembled by the Basmo commander, Colonel Kruse, who attacked the Swedes in a bloody battle. Charles XII barely escaped capture, but the tide was soon turned against the outnumbered Norwegians, and Kruse, badly wounded, was captured. The Swedes went on to occupy Christiania (now Oslo) without resistance on March 21, 1716, but were ultimately repulsed. Basmo was also in the path of invading Swedish troops during Charles XII's second unsuccessful invasion in 1718.

Basmo was shut down and de-commissioned during 1744–45. Today there is a ruin with barely visible defense works and the stone base of the former tower. In 1987, work was started on restoration of the site.

== See also ==
- Blaker Fortress
- Christiansfjell Fortress

== Other sources ==
- Norges festninger by Guthorm Kavli; Universitetsforlaget; 1987; ISBN 82-00-18430-7
- History of the Norwegian People, by Knut Gjerset, MacMillan, 1915.
- The Struggle for Supremacy in the Baltic: 1600-1725 by Jill Lisk; Funk & Wagnalls, New York, 1967.
- The Northern Wars, 1558-1721 by Robert I. Frost; Longman, Harlow, England; 2000 ISBN 0-582-06429-5
