= Terningen skanse =

Building in Elverum, Innlandet, Norway

Coordinates: 60°53′00″N 11°30′30″E

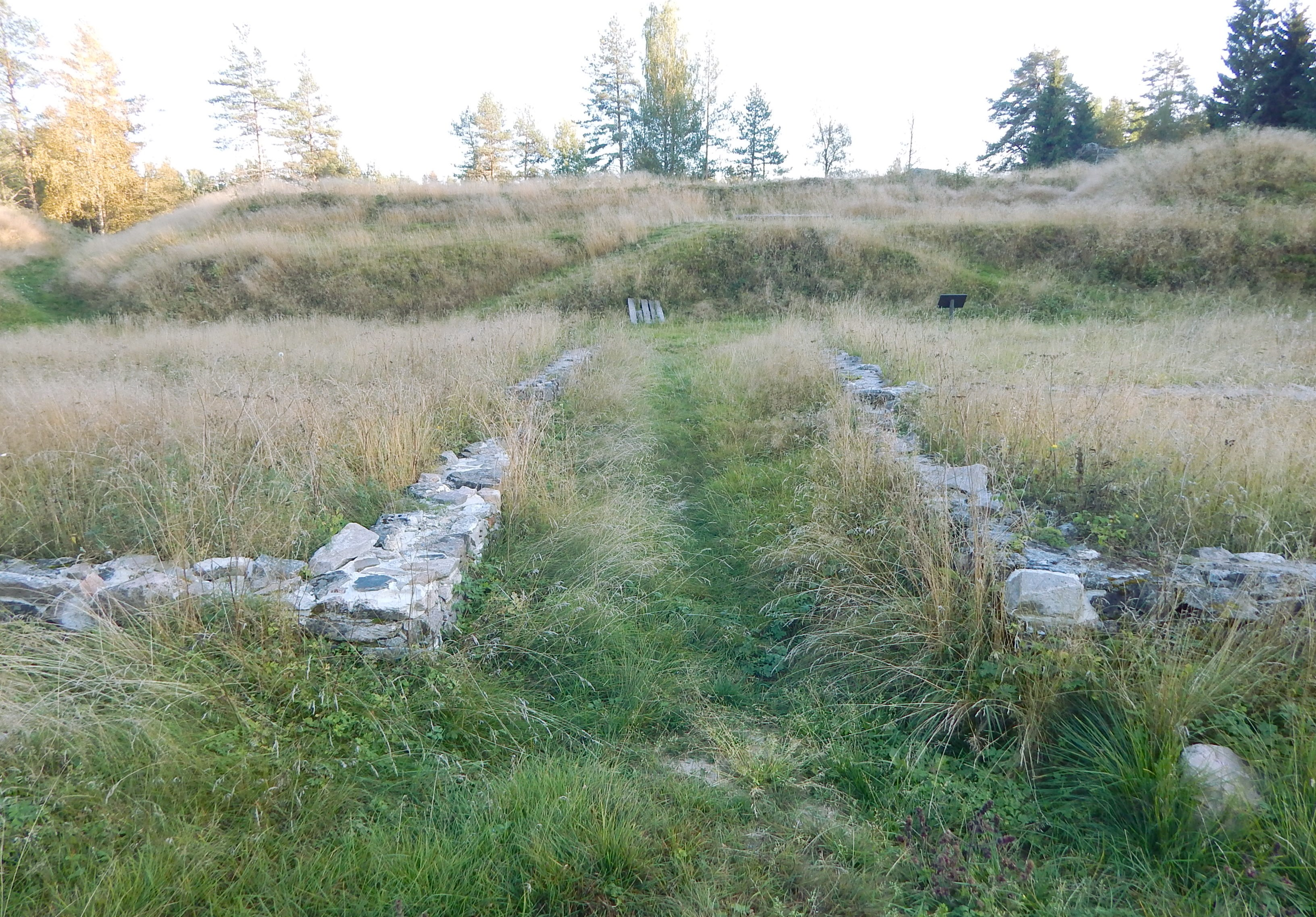
Remains of barracks. Rampart in the background

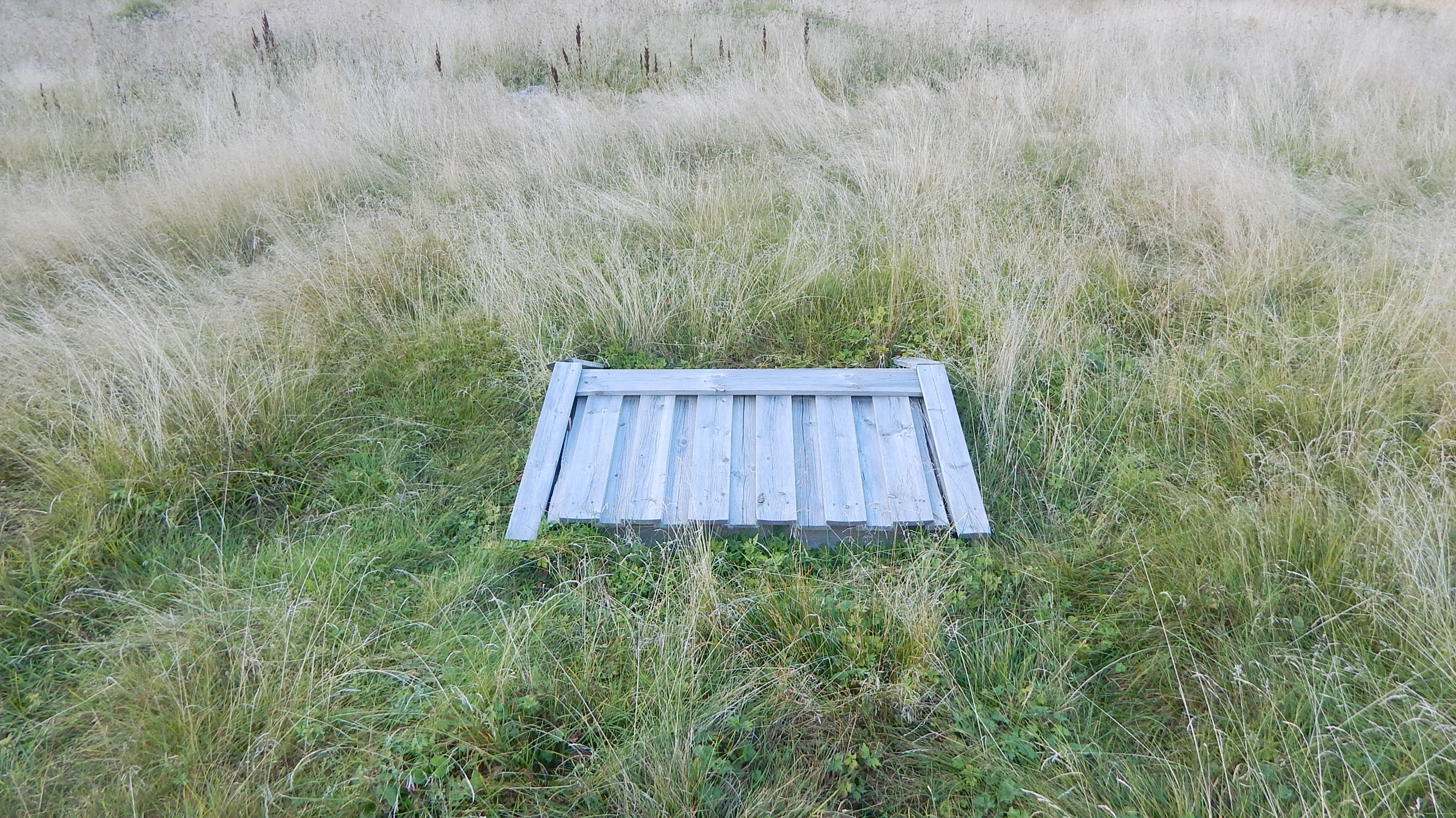
The well

Terningen Skanse is a small fortification, a schanze. It is situated approximately 2 kilometres (1.2 mi) west of the town of Elverum, Elverumsleiret, in Innlandet county in eastern Norway. It guards the small river "Terningen", and was constructed as a defence against the Swedes. River Terningen and Terningen Skanse also lends its name to the current Norwegian army camp, situated about 50 m away; Terningmoen.

== History ==
=== 1673–1742 ===
The fortification was planned by King Christian V of Denmark-Norway and Statholder (viceroy) to Norway, Ulrik Fredrik Gyldenløve. Generalløytnant (Lieutenant-General) Rusenstein was in 1671 appointed the task of planning fortifications in the Elverum aeria. In 1673 Lieutenant Anthony Coucheron got the task of detail planning of two schanzes west of Elverum. One of these being Terningen skanse which should control the crossing of Terningen river and a nearby crossroad. The fortification was finished in 1675 being about 25*25m with a defense line of 250 m closer to the river. In addition to infantry, the schanze received three 3-pound cannons from Akershus fortress. The first commander was kaptein Jacob Michelet from Opplandske infanteriregiment. After the end of the Scanian War, the fortification was manned until April 1680. In 1683 the work with a stronger fortification, Hammersberget skanse in Elverum started, and Terningen decaded. In 1742 it was abandoned.

=== 1811–1814 ===
During the Napoleonic Wars there was some hostilities between Denmark–Norway and Sweden in 1808 and Terningen was again commissioned. The reconstruction was under the direction of Frederik of Hesse and the size now grew to 125*125m. The construction was a square with a bastion in each corner forming a star fort with ramparts and a dry moat. Along the Contrescarpe there was a palisade. The bridge over the moat could be withdrawn. Inside the rampart was set up four log buildings around an inner court yard with a well in the center. The buildings held barracks for officers and men, stables, kitchen and storehouse. The work in the area started in 1811 under lieutenant (ing) Vosgraff. Later under kaptein (ing) von Purgau. The work was finished in 1814. Terningen also has two redoubts. One is named Størch-Glads redoubt, now within Terningmoen camp. The other is situated on a height, 334 ell west of the Terningen. After the Napoleonic Wars Terningen was again abandoned.

On 2. August 2014 the Terningen skanse was given Heritage protection.
