= Fredriksberg Fortress =

Coordinates: 60.3964°N 5.3091°E

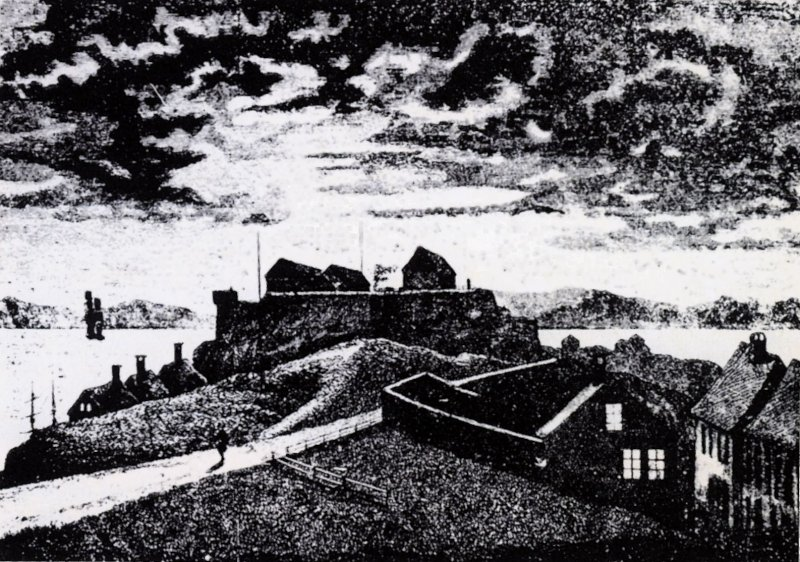
Fredriksberg, drawing from 1875 by Nicolay Nilsen

Fredriksberg fort is a Norwegian fortification located at the highest point of Nordnes in Bergen.

== History ==
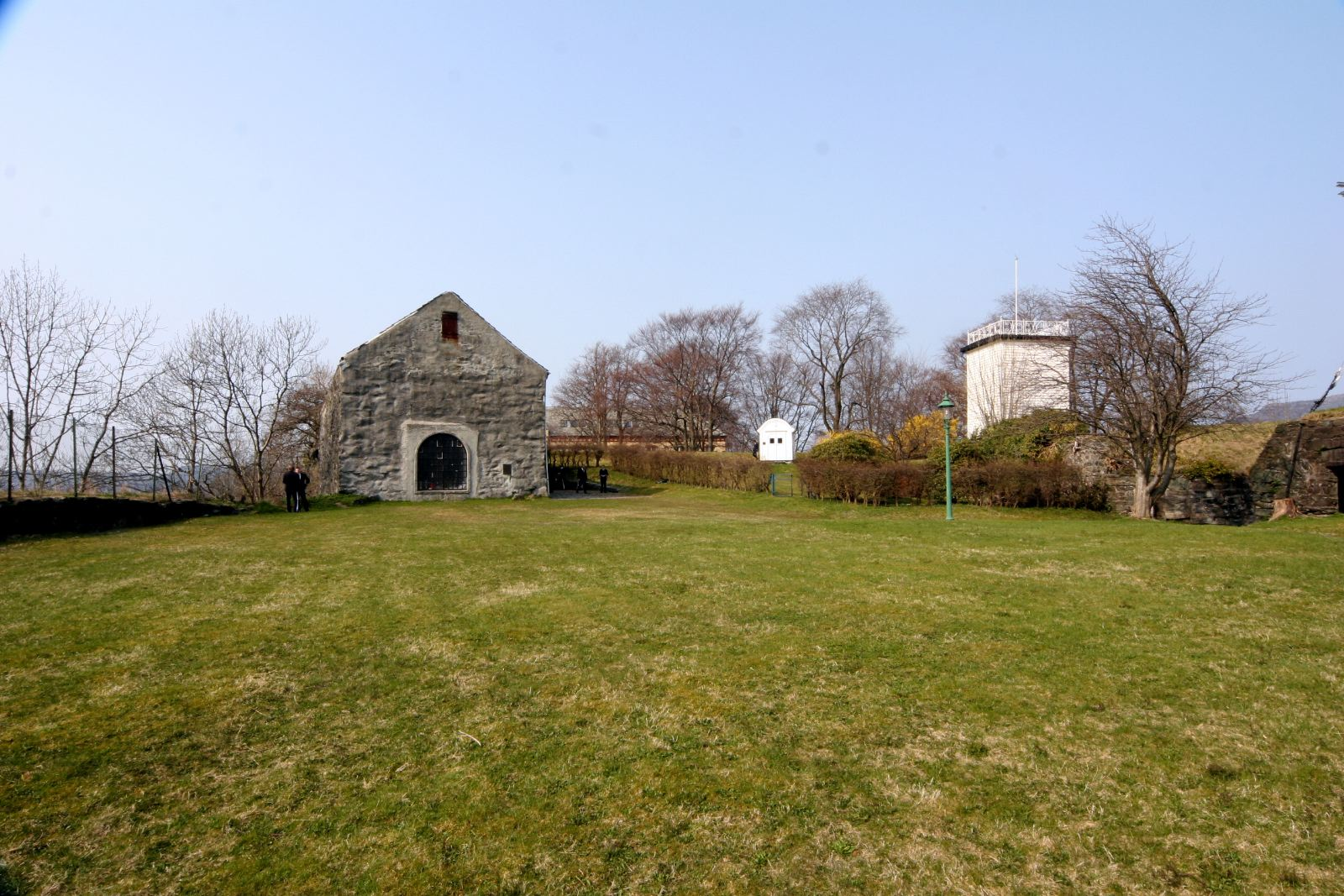
Inside Fredriksberg fortress in 2005

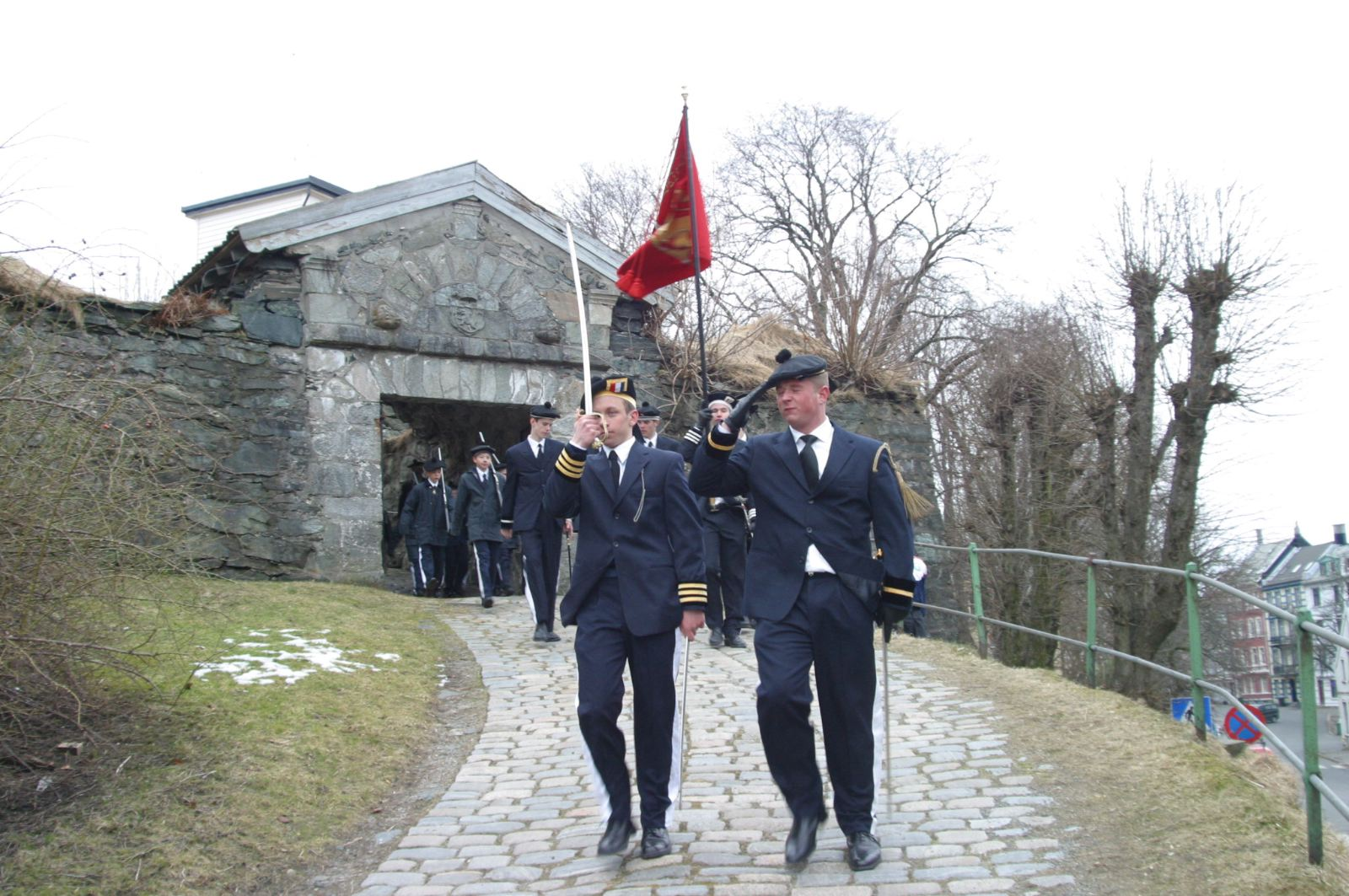
Nordnæs Bataillon

The Norwegian fortress Fredriskberg lay strategically placed on Nordnes’ highest point with a precipitous cliff face to the sea on the west side. Dutch Engineer Major General Henrik Ruse (1624-79) initiated the fortress construction, planned with three bastions and a half bastion on the land side and a wall on the side adjacent to the cliff. The fort was built between 1666 and 1667. It was built after and in many respects because of the Battle of Vågen. It is named after King Fredrik III of Norway.

The construction stalled and the fortifications decayed. A 1695 inspection of Bergen by Christian V of Denmark’s son, Christian Gyldenløve was the impetus which restarted work on the fortifications. By 1706 construction had been completed, albeit in a less complicated layout than originally planned.

Fredriksberg served among other things as a place of execution. Katten, the bastion, was also built in 1666 in what today is the Nordnes Park. The Lavette houses were built in 1810 and 1843 as military storages. After the city fire in 1916 they were used as temporary housing.

The grounds in front of the Lavette houses were used as a place of execution until the Swedish counterfeiter Jacob Wallin was executed in 1876.

The Nordnes Park was built 1888-1898 partly on some of the old fortifications.

The fortress has also been part of the Bergen Fire Fighting Service. It was a fire watch station from 1667 and a fire station from 1905 to 1926.

Today part of the fort is rented by Nordnæs Bataillon—a social club/buekorps.
