= Blaker Fortress =

Former defense facility in the village of Blaker, Norway

Coordinates: 60°00′13″N 11°18′22″E

Blaker skanse
- Blaker, Norway
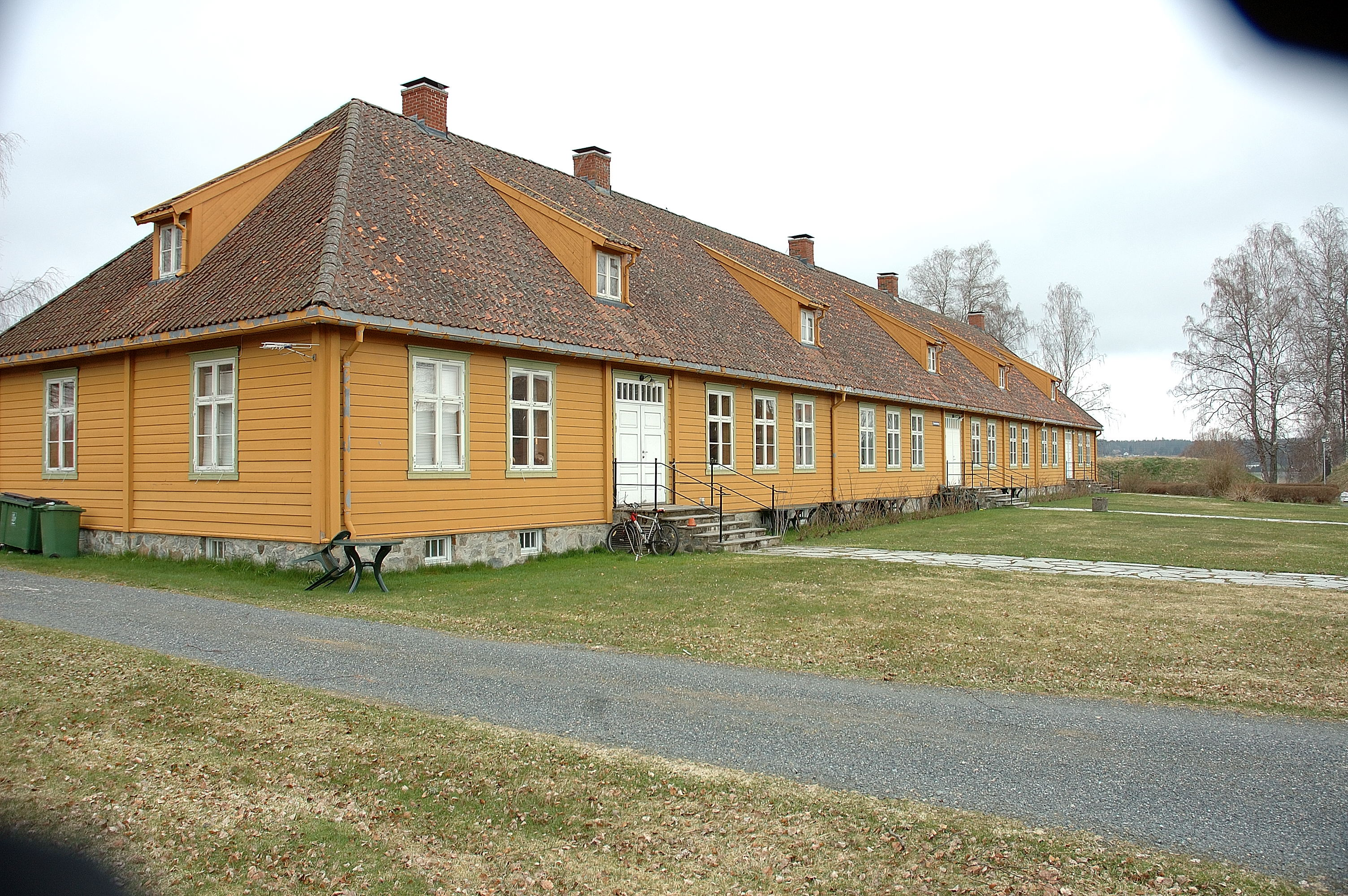

Site history
- Built: 1675
- Materials: wood
- Battles/wars: Swedish invasion 1718

Blaker Fortress (Blaker skanse) is a former defense facility located at the village of Blaker in Akershus country, Norway.

It was one of the Norwegian fortresses which were constructed in the period of intense competition among the Baltic powers (Denmark-Norway, Sweden, Russia, Poland and the German states) for northern supremacy. In 1675 Ulrik Frederik Gyldenløve, Governor-general of Norway, indicated an intent to construct a fortress in the Glomma river where Blaker lies as part of his general program of Norwegian fortification upgrades. His objective was a stronghold available both to serve as a safe defensive position when necessary and a location to station troops who could take the offensive against invaders when the opportunity availed itself. Blaker Fortress saw action in 1718, when it was surrounded by the invading Swedish army, but the siege collapsed upon the death of King Charles XII of Sweden in front of Fredriksten Fortress.

The 17th and beginning of the 18th century was a period of virtually continuous war or preparation for war, as follows:

- 1611 to 1613 - Kalmar War
- 1618 to 1648 - Thirty Years' War
- 1655 to 1658 – Northern Wars
- 1673 to 1675 – Fortification Upgrades
- 1675 to 1679 – Gyldenløve War
- 1700 to 1721 – Great Northern War

Blaker Fortress was de-commissioned as a fortress in 1820, but remained a military area until 1893. From 1917 to 2003, Statens Husflidsskole (now University College of Akershus conducted classes on site.

== Other sources ==
- Norges festninger by Guthorm Kavli; Universitetsforlaget; 1987; ISBN 82-00-18430-7
