= Løvstakksiden =

Coordinates: 60.3688°N 5.3359°E

- Neighbourhood
- Interactive map of Løvstakksiden
- Country: Norway
- County: Vestland
- District: Midhordland
- Municipality: Bergen
- Borough: Årstad

Population (2008)
  - Total: 7,965
- As an unofficial area the population can't be fully determined

Løvstakksiden, commonly shortened to Løvstakken or simply Stakken, is a neighbourhood in the city of Bergen in Vestland county, Norway. Currently it is part of the borough of Årstad, but before 2000 it was part of a borough called "Løvstakken" which covered the eastern and western sides of the mountain Løvstakken, consisting of Fyllingsdalen in the west and Løvstakksiden in the east.

Although the neighbourhood has no official boundaries, it can be said to cover the urban area to the northeast of the mountain Løvstakken, or parts of western Årstad. Løvstakksiden is not considered a "traditional" neighbourhood of Bergen, because it is located outside the core borough of Bergenhus. However it remains inside Bergen's urban area, in the borough of Årstad.

Løvstakksiden is also a local parish in Bergen with two churches, Solheim Church and St. Markus Church.

== History ==
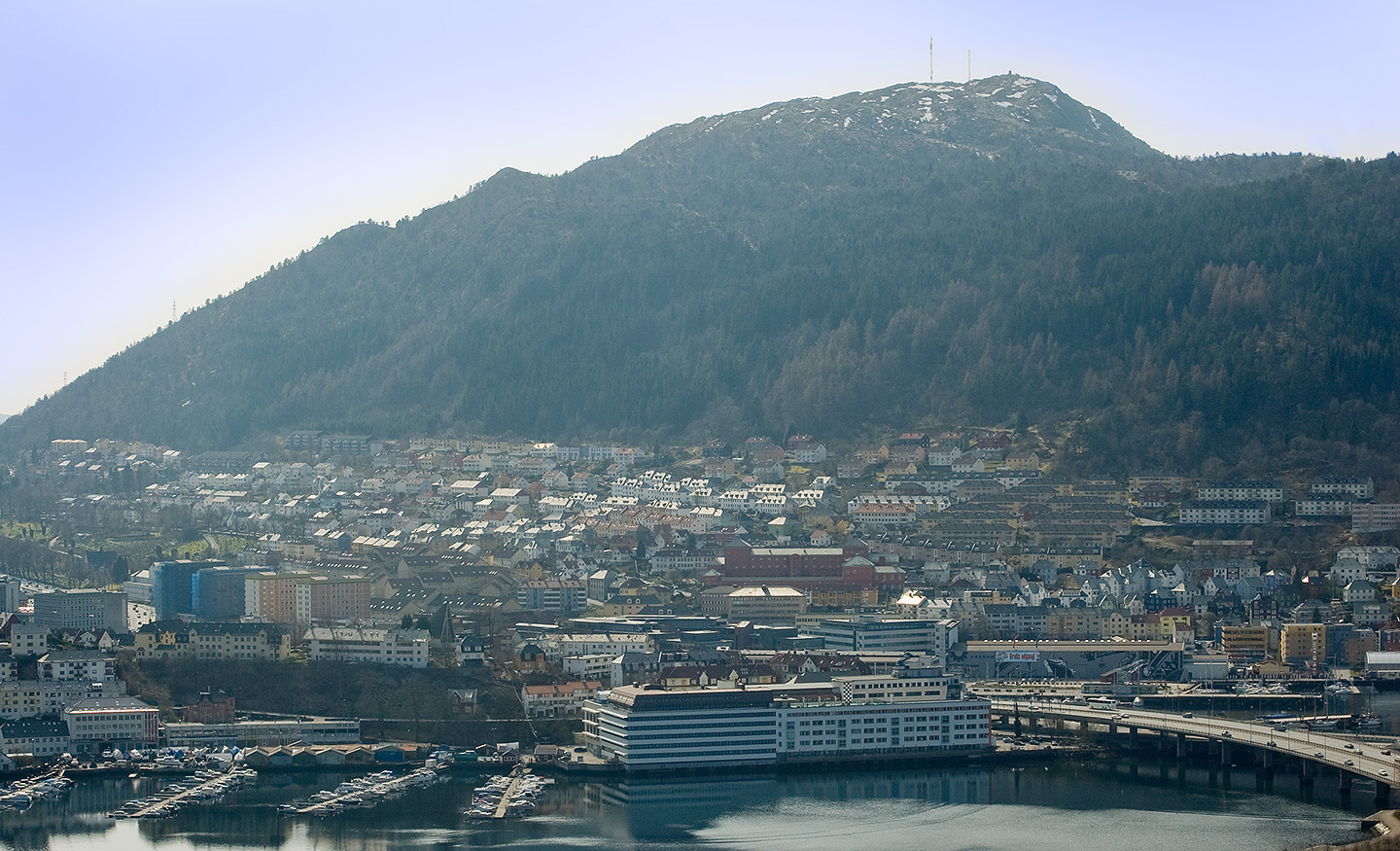
Løvstakksiden, with the mountain Løvstakken in the background.

In the early 20th century, Løvstakksiden was predominantly a traditional working class neighbourhood. However, in the 1970s many industrial work places closed down, and so the character of the neighbourhood changed. With many smaller apartments in the area, it became more attractive for senior citizens and low-income families, and other young single people.

Until recently housing was inexpensive. However, with the northern parts being close to the university and other schools, a number of students have moved into the area, thus increasing the rental prices. Løvstakksiden has a large amount of housing projects, with one third of buildings in the area being owned by the municipality, the highest concentration in all of Bergen. When working-class families started moving out of these, the municipality placed more needy individuals in them, many with drug-related problems.

In the local newspaper Bergensavisen in the 1990s, the leader of the child protection services was quoted as saying that children should not live in the neighborhood. He meant there was too much drug abuse, violence, and police action there. Local residents protested at this, saying the whole neighbourhood was being stigmatized, when only part of it had such problems.

In recent years, the neighbourhood has received a number of immigrants. The proportion of immigrants increased from 4.1% in 1990 to 11.7% in 2000. In 1990 the largest immigrant group came from Chile; in 2000 the majority came from Bosnia-Herzegovina and Iraq.

== Demographics ==
The population of the neighbourhood was claimed to be about 3,435 in 2000, although this figure depends on how the neighbourhood is defined. Løvstakksiden is an unofficial area, and is often considered to extend somewhat further south than in this example. In the Municipality Living Standards Report of 2008 the areas named "Solheim nord" and "Solheim sør" (identified as roughly corresponding to Løvstakksiden) had a combined population of 7965 (5422 and 2543 respectively).

It is also the neighbourhood in Bergen which has the largest immigrant population. In 2000 one third of all arriving refugees to Bergen were placed in the neighbourhood.

== Education ==
The main school of Løvstakksiden is the combined elementary and lower secondary school, Ny Krohnborg skole. Because of the relatively large immigrant population of Løvstakksiden, Ny Krohnborg is home to a large diversity of pupils. In 1998 the proportion of pupils from minority backgrounds was 34%. In 2005, about 75% of the pupils in the first grade were from a minority background.

== Economy ==
The average income of the inhabitants of Løvstakksiden was 138,526 kr in 1999, which was clearly lower than for the city of Bergen as a whole at that time. In the Municipality Living Standards Report of 2008 the area Solheim nord had an average income of 194,800 kr, while Solheim sør had an average income of 220,100 kr. These areas had practically the lowest average incomes for the whole city.

== Crime ==
In 2013, the police decided to close down the local police station, Løvstakken Nærpoliti.

Løvstakksiden is also home to Løvstakken Nærpoliti, which is a local police force, the only one in Bergen other than the main police force. This was moved from Landås to Løvstakksiden in 1999 due to the higher crime rates in the area. For two years this was a very effective move which helped reduce the crime rates, however after 2001 crime again started to increase. Most criminal activity is in the areas of drugs, robbery, and violence.

== "Archery brigades" (buekorps) ==
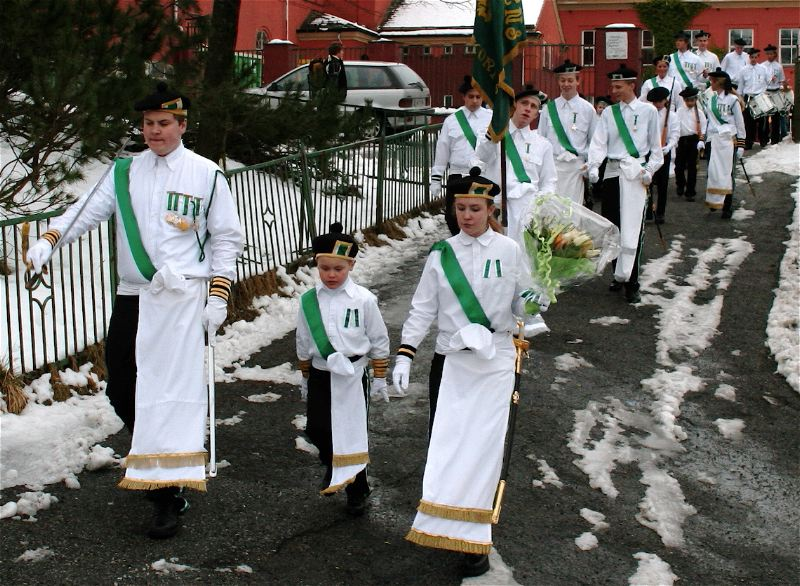
The local neighbourhood buekorps of Løvstakksiden, "Løvstakkens Jægerkorps".

The neighborhood has an "archery brigade" (or buekorps)—Løvstakkens Jægerkorps—founded in 1903. Krohnvikens Bataljon, a now defunct buekorps probably founded before 1854, was a predecessor of Løvstakkens Jægerkorps.

== In Culture ==
Stig Holmås' Norwegian novel "Regn" published in 2008 (ISBN 978-82-05-39515-2) is set in Løvstakksiden during the 1950s. The shipyard Bergen Mekaniske Verksted, Kronsminde sports stadium and Ny Krohnborg school and are all important locations in the story. The buekorps is mentioned as well as several streets and Solheim kirke.
