= Jonas Budde =

Danish-Norwegian army officer (1644–1710)

- Born: 23 January 1644
- Died: 1710 (aged 65–66)
- Allegiance: Denmark-Norway
- Rank: Lieutenant Colonel
- Commands: Christiansfjell Fortress; Stavern Fortress
- Spouse: Alhed Wiborg

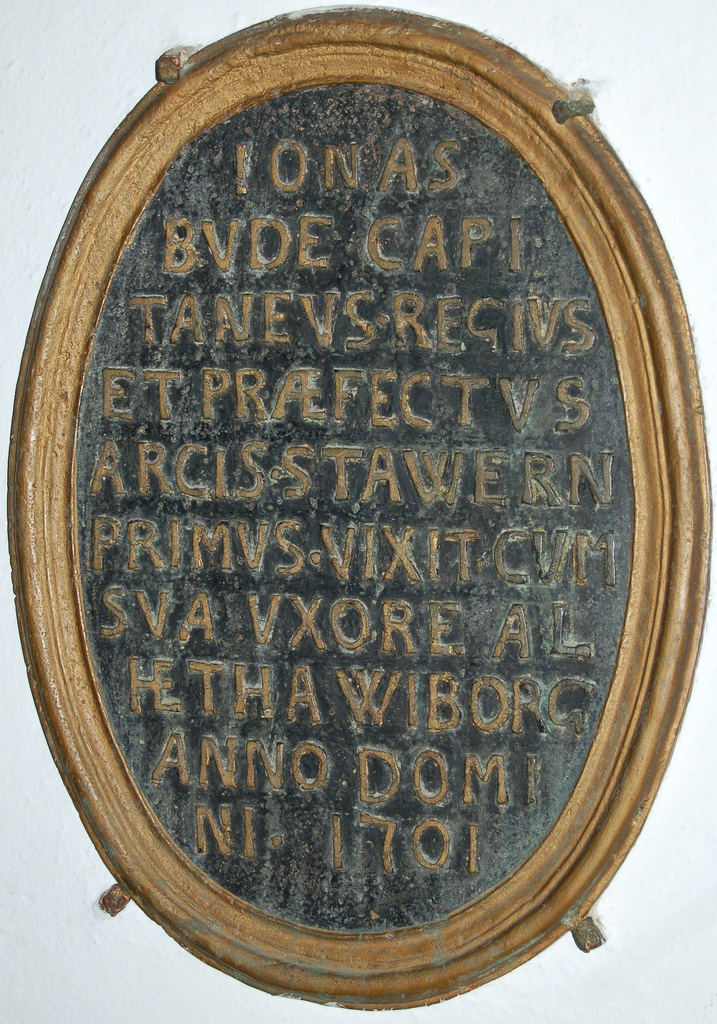
Hanging in Tanum Church, Larvik, Norway

Jonas Budde or Jonas Olufsen Bude, (23 January 1644 – 1710) served a distinguished career in the military of Denmark-Norway, including service at various Norwegian fortresses during the extended period of hostility between Sweden and Denmark-Norway. He served as an officer of Fredrikstad Fortress garrison from 1676 through 1681 (including the period of the Gyldenløve War), was the commanding officer of Christiansfjeld fortress from October 24, 1684, to February 2, 1688, and was lieutenant colonel (Oberstløjtnant) and commanding officer of Stavern Fortress from November 3, 1689, until his death in 1710 at sixty six years of age.

== Family ==
Jonas Budde was married in 1670 in Fredericia, Denmark with Alhed Wiborg, born 29 September 1633 in Malmø, Denmark (modern Sweden), daughter of mayor (borgermester) Niels Wiborg and Karen Hendrichsdatter Franche. She died 19 April 1701 in Stavern with no surviving children.
