= List of forts in Norway =

Norwegian fortresses or fortifications have been constructed from some of the earliest recorded periods, down through the 20th century. The geography and topography of glacially carved, mountainous Norway constrain both the sea and the land routes which an aggressor must follow. Natural strong-points, such as rock outcroppings at Halden, Tønsberg and Trondheim make excellent bases for fortification (i.e., natural fortresses).

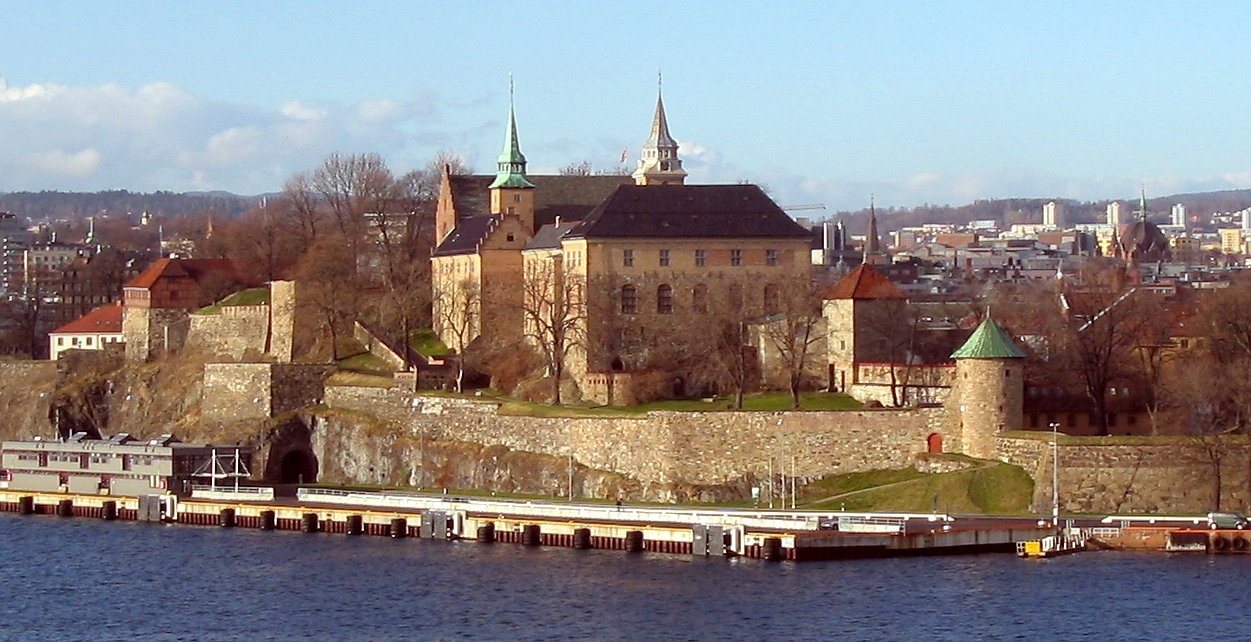
Akershus Fortress

Fortifications evolved to accommodate the offensive threat which they guard against. Early castles provided a strong defense against the attack of the day, and were normally taken by duplicity or siege. In the age of black powder, cannon allowed breaching of the fortress walls and subsequent taking by storm. As a result, fortresses changed form, now incorporating design features like the bastion, ravelin, and glacis to allow cannon within the fortress to be effective while protecting the walls and defenders from external attack. This evolution of technology continued into the 20th century as weaponry continued to evolve.

== Historical context for Norwegian fortresses ==
=== Baltic Power Wars ===
Most Norwegian fortresses were constructed in the period of intense competition among the Baltic powers (Denmark-Norway, Sweden, Russia, Poland and the German states) for northern supremacy. The 16th, 17th and beginning of the 18th Century was a period of virtually continuous war or preparation for war:

- 1563 to 1570 - Nordic Seven Years' War
- 1611 to 1613 - Kalmar War
- 1618 to 1648 - Thirty Years' War (See also Hannibal War)
- 1655 to 1658 – Northern War
- 1673 to 1675 – Fortification Upgrades
- 1675 to 1679 – Gyldenløve War
- 1700 to 1721 – Great Northern War

In 1600 Denmark controlled virtually all land bordering on the Skagerrak, Kattegat, Store Bælt and the restricted Sound (Øresund). The current Swedish provinces of Skåne and Halland were Danish and the province of Bohuslän was then Norwegian.

== Norwegian fortresses ==
=== The Castle Period (1600 and earlier) ===
- Akershus Fortress in Oslo
- Audunborg in Ålhus (in Sunnfjord Municipality)
- Bergenhus Fortress in Bergen
- Broberg in Bohuslen
- Båhus Fortress
- Dyngehus in Bohuslen
- Hamarhus Castle in Hamar
- Isegran in Fredrikstad
- Kirkwall Bishop's Palace
- Mjøskastellet on Steinsholmen.
- Olsborg Castle in Bohuslen
- Oslo Kongsgård estate
- Oslo Bishop's Palace
- Steinvikholm Castle in Stjørdal Municipality
- Sverresborg Castle in Trondheim
- Sverresborg Castle in Bergen
- Tønsberg Fortress
- Vardøhus Fortress
- Valdisholmborg
- Valkaberg castle in Oslo

=== The Age of Black Powder (1600 - 1900) ===
- Fredriksberg fortress
- Fredriksholm Fortress (Kristiansand)
- Fredrikstad Fortress
- Fredriksten Fortress
- Fredriksværn
- Kongsvinger Fortress
- Basmo Fortress
- Blaker Fortress
- Christiansfjeld Fortress (Elverum)
- Munkholmen Fortress (Trondheim)
- Staverns Fortress
- Christiansholm Fortress (Kristiansand)
- Christiansø Fortress
- Kristiansten Fortress (Trondheim)
- Altenhus Fortress (Alta)

=== Modern fortresses ===
- Hegra Fortress
- Helgøya Fortress
- Kvarven Fort
- Odderøya Fortress
- Oscarsborg Fortress
- Trondenes Fort
- Meløyvær Fortress
- Møvik Fortress

== Bibliography ==
- Norges festninger by Guthorm Kavli; Universitetsforlaget; 1987; ISBN 82-00-18430-7
- The Struggle for Supremacy in the Baltic: 1600-1725 by Jill Lisk; Funk & Wagnalls, New York, 1967
- The Northern Wars, 1558-1721 by Robert I. Frost; Longman, Harlow, England; 2000 ISBN 0-582-06429-5
