= Solheims Bataljon =

Buekorps in Bergen

Solheims Bataljon was a buekorps in Bergen which existed from 1927 to shortly after 1950, though some claim it was founded already in the 1890s. It is certain however, that the brigade came into existence because of the barracks which was raised after the city-fire in 1916. The boys made and took care of their rifles themselves. The working-class area in which the brigade had their headquarters was commonly called "Blodbyen" ("The city of blood").

The brigade came into decline when the barrackses at Solheim was torn down, and was discontinued some time during the 1930s. However, after the war the brigade was re-established, and they marched for the first time on May 22, 1946 when they joined the 86-year celebration of another brigade, Skansens Bataljon. Arne Brakstad was the chief in 1950 but a few years later Solheims Bataljon were discontinued, probably for its last time.

== Sources ==
- Buekorps - Solheims Bataljon

== Bibliography ==
- Sletten, Torstein (1972), Buekorpsene i Bergen: i tekst og bilder gjennom hundre år, ED.B. GIERTSENS FORLAG, ISBN 82-90073-00-3
