= Løvstakkens Jægerkorps =

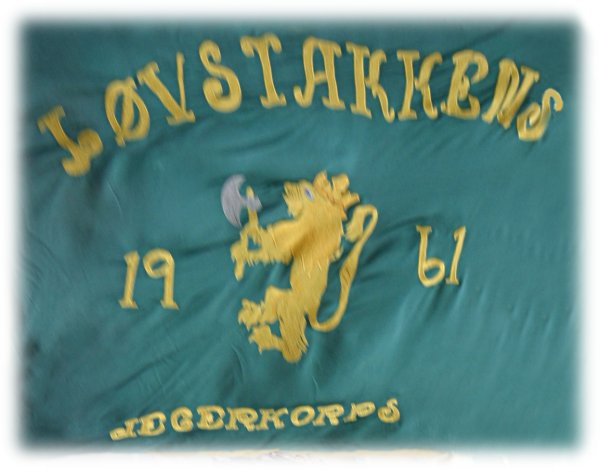
Official banner.

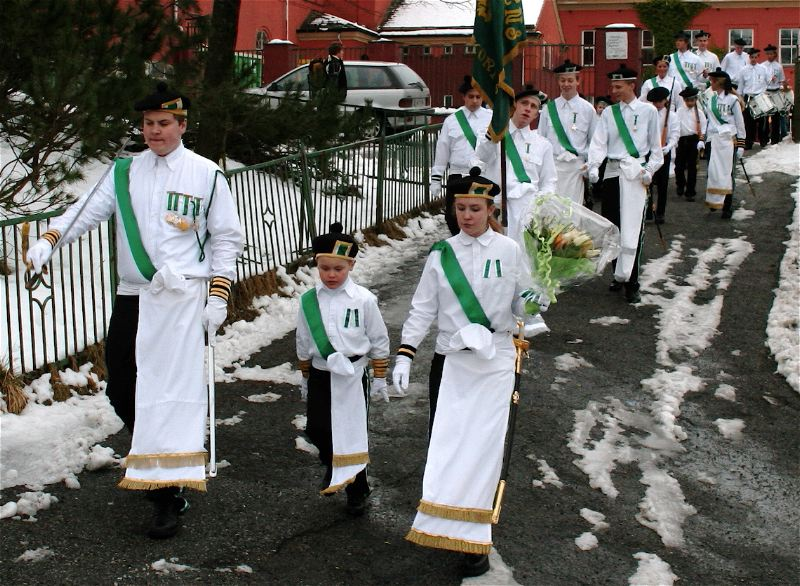
Løvstakkens Jægerkorps first day in uniform, 2005.

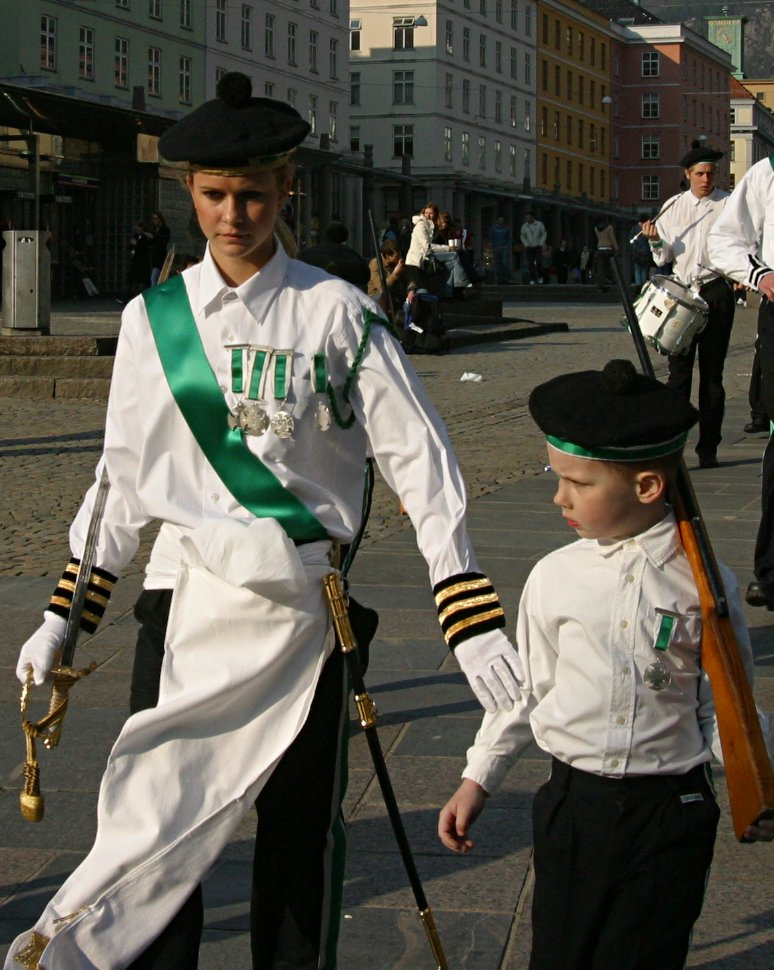
Løvstakken-boy in deep concentration.

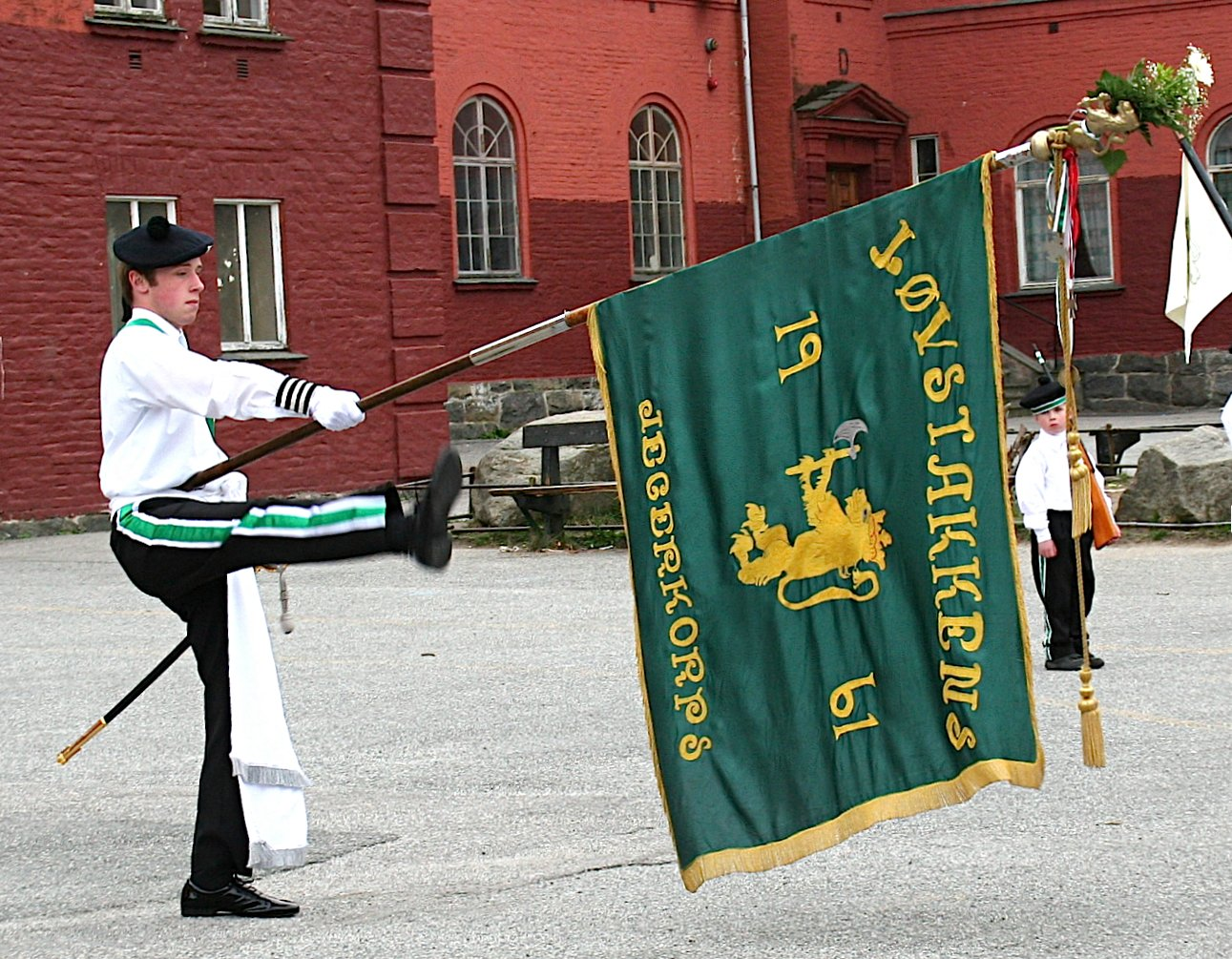
Parade.

Løvstakkens Jægerkorps is a buekorps in Bergen, Norway. It is mainly the buekorps for the neighbourhood of Løvstakksiden. It was founded for the first time in 1903, then for boys only. On May 11, 1999 it was founded again as a "mixed brigade", allowing both boys and girls as members. Their current motto is: "Vennskap og samhold gir styrke" ("Friendship and unity gives strength").

== History ==
Among the predecessors of Løvstakkens Jægerkorps was Krohnvikens Bataljon (founded before 1854). The first Løvstakkens Jægerkorps was founded on May 11, 1903 but lasted only until 1918.

Ten years later, on April 30, 1928, it was however re-established after initiative by Johannes Ludvigsen who collected all that was of effects from the two earlier brigades. Another brigade that had competed with the first Løvstakkens Jægerkorps were Skytterbanens Bataljon which the bickerings still continued with. When the boys started up again they were poorly equipped. They received some old tree-rifles, and one drum was all they had available for use. They had a modest first march with 15–20 privates and one drummer, banner-carrier and chief.

But as of 1929 older boys from Solheimsviken joined in, and the year after they expanded greatly; 130 privates, 24 axe-carriers and 10 drummers was the impressive result. In 1933 the brigade celebrated its 5-year anniversary, and the first issue of their newsletter "Løvstakkgutten" ("the Løvstakken-boy") was published.

In 1934 the brigade was probably the first to get a leisure-center when a related organization rented for them a room where various games, a radio and a gramophone were made available to them. During the same year a co-operation with Skutevikens Buekorps and Sydnæs Bataljon were initiated.

When "Guttekorpsenes Allianse" ("the Boy-brigades' Alliance") was founded in 1957 by 12 of the then 18 brigades of the city Løvstakkens Jægerkorps immediately joined in. The members of this alliance participated at amongst other events at the opening of Bergen International Festival.

Interest for the brigade lasted well up until 1964 when the recruitment vanished, and the following year it wasn't possible to keep it up. The main reason for the decline went to the great traffic-increase at Danmarksplass which made it impossible to move around in their practice-area without help from the police.

At the end of the 90s work started for re-establishing the buekorps as a leisure-organization for both boys and girls. The brigade was founded in April 1999, and marched for the first time on 17 May (national day of Norway), 1999. Løvstakkens Jægerkorps has numerous activities for its own members in a building in the neighbourhood.

== Løvstakkens marsj ==
The official song of Løvstakkens Jægerkorps, written in 1938, is called "Løvstakkens marsj":

Løvstakkens marsj:
Composition by Odd Walle, Text by Sigurd Steffensen

Vi heve vil vårt løveflagg, så fritt det kan få vaie,
Få vaie fritt for hver en vind og samle sine gutter inn.
Din løve kraft - den gir oss makt, om den vi vil oss samle.
Den fri som fuglen over fjellet sin flukt imot det mål,
Oss samle om vårt kjære merke. Stå på vakt hver Løvstakksgutt.!

Nå vaier fritt for hver en vind vårt kjære samlingsmerke.
Med faste skritt med blikket fritt vi samlet om vår fane står.
I kamp for alt vi fikk så kjært, skal samhold gjøre sterke.
Oss løfte opp mot høye tinder, gir korpset evig vår.
Vi samles om vårt kjære merke, Stå på vakt hver Løvstakksgutt!

== Bibliography ==
- Sletten, Torstein (1972), Buekorpsene i Bergen: i tekst og bilder gjennom hundre år, ED.B. GIERTSENS FORLAG, ISBN 82-90073-00-3
- Gjerstad, Jo (2005), Buekorpsene i Bergen, Bergen kommune, ISBN 82-7128-383-9
