= Djupvik (surname) =

Djupvik is a surname. Notable people with the surname include:

- Anlaug Amanda Djupvik, Norwegian astronomer
- Anton Djupvik (1881–1951), Norwegian politician
- Morten Djupvik (born 1972), Norwegian show jumper
- Olav Djupvik (1931–2016), Norwegian politician
- Roger Aa Djupvik (born 1981), Norwegian cross-country skier
