= Blaker =

Coordinates: 60°00′14″N 11°18′06″E

- Village
- Interactive map of Blaker
- Country: Norway
- Region: Østlandet
- County: Akershus
- Time zone: UTC+01:00 (CET)
  - Summer (DST): UTC+02:00 (CEST)

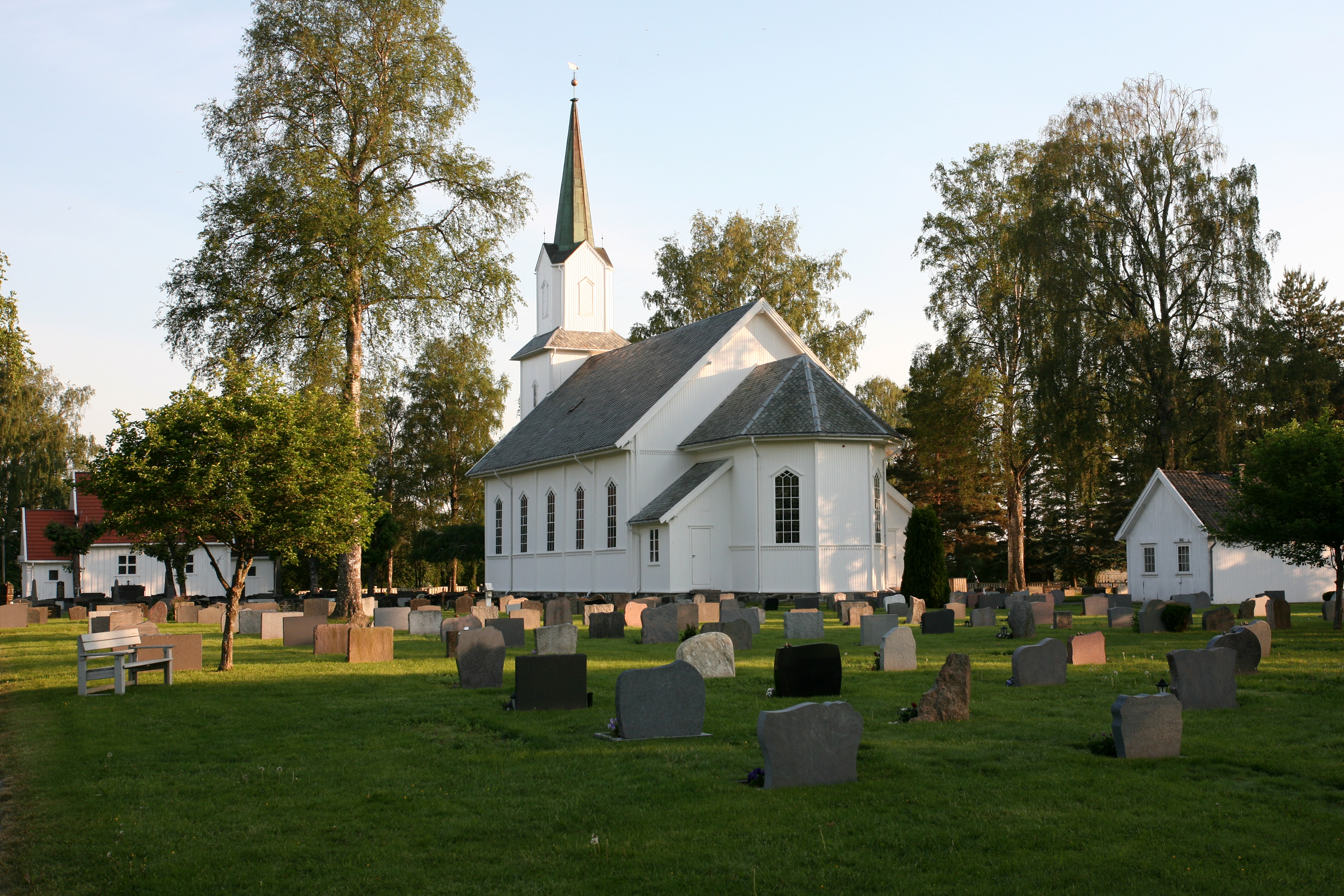
Blaker church

Blaker is a village and a former municipality of Akershus county, Norway.

== History ==
The municipality was established on 1 July 1919, when Aurskog was split in two. At the time of establishment, Blaker had a population of 2,533. On 1 January 1962, Blaker with its then 2,345 inhabitants was merged with Sørum to form the new Sørum municipality.

The village is situated on the east bank of Glomma, with a railway station on Kongsvingerbanen and Blaker Fortress. The fortress was in use from 1683, expanded to a bastioned star fort in the middle of the 18th century, and decommissioned in 1820. Blaker Church (Blaker Kirke) was built in 1881. The church was huilt of wood and has 450 seats.

== Notable residents ==
- Olav Djupvik, politician for the Norwegian Christian Democratic Party
- Christian Birch-Reichenwald (1814–1891) Norwegian politician.

== The name ==
Blaker is an old district name (Norse Blakar). The meaning is unknown.
