= St. Mark's Church, Bergen =

Church in Vestland, Norway

St. Mark's Church
- St. Markus kirke
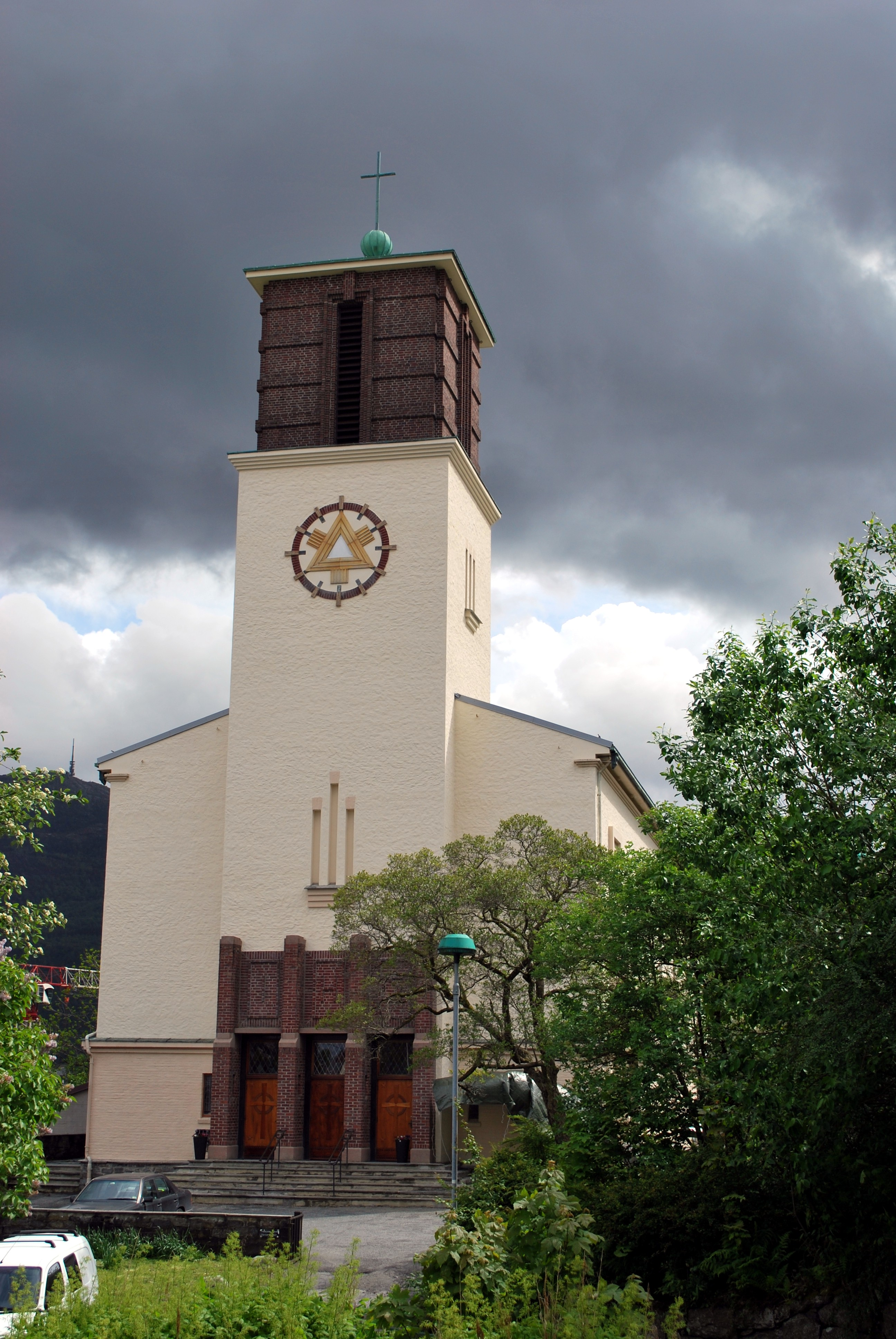
- View of the church
- St. Mark's Church
- 60°22′44″N 5°19′24″E
- Location: Bergen, Vestland
- Country: Norway
- Denomination: Church of Norway
- Churchmanship: Evangelical Lutheran

History
- Status: Parish church
- Founded: 1939
- Consecrated: 12 Feb 1939

Architecture
- Functional status: Active
- Architect(s): S. Losnedal and N. Brøndmo
- Architectural type: Long church
- Style: Art deco
- Completed: 1939 (87 years ago)

Specifications
- Capacity: 650
- Materials: Brick

Administration
- Diocese: Bjørgvin bispedømme
- Deanery: Bergensdalen prosti
- Parish: Løvstakksiden
- Norwegian Cultural Heritage Site
- Type: Church
- Status: Protected
- ID: 85537

St. Mark's Church (Norwegian: St. Markus kirke) is a parish church of the Church of Norway in Bergen Municipality in Vestland county, Norway. It is located in the Løvstakksiden neighborhood in the borough of Årstad in the city of Bergen. It is one of the two churches for the Løvstakksiden parish which is part of the Bergensdalen prosti (deanery) in the Diocese of Bjørgvin. The white, plastered brick church was built in a long church design and in an art deco style in 1939 using plans drawn up by the architects Sverre Losnedahl and Nicolay Brøndmo. The church seats about 650 people.

== History ==
In 1928, the new parish of St. Mark was established. Land had been purchased in 1919 for a future church. Initial plans for the new church were rejected and an architectural competition was held in 1931 to determine the architect. The competition was won by Sverre Losnedahl and Nicolay Brøndmo. The drawings were somewhat modified and a budget was determined. Construction took place during the late 1930s and the new building was consecrated on 12 February 1939.

== Media gallery ==
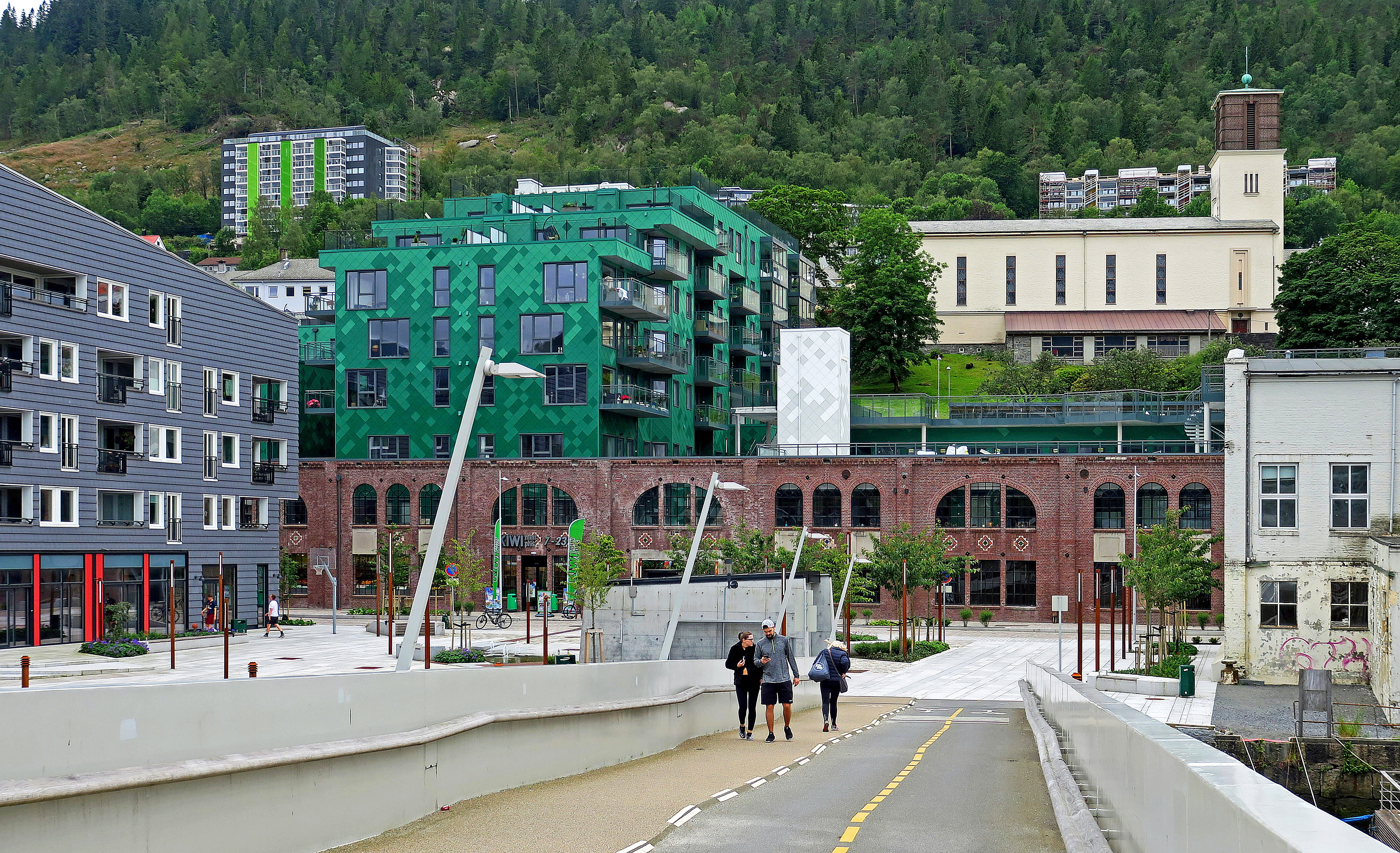

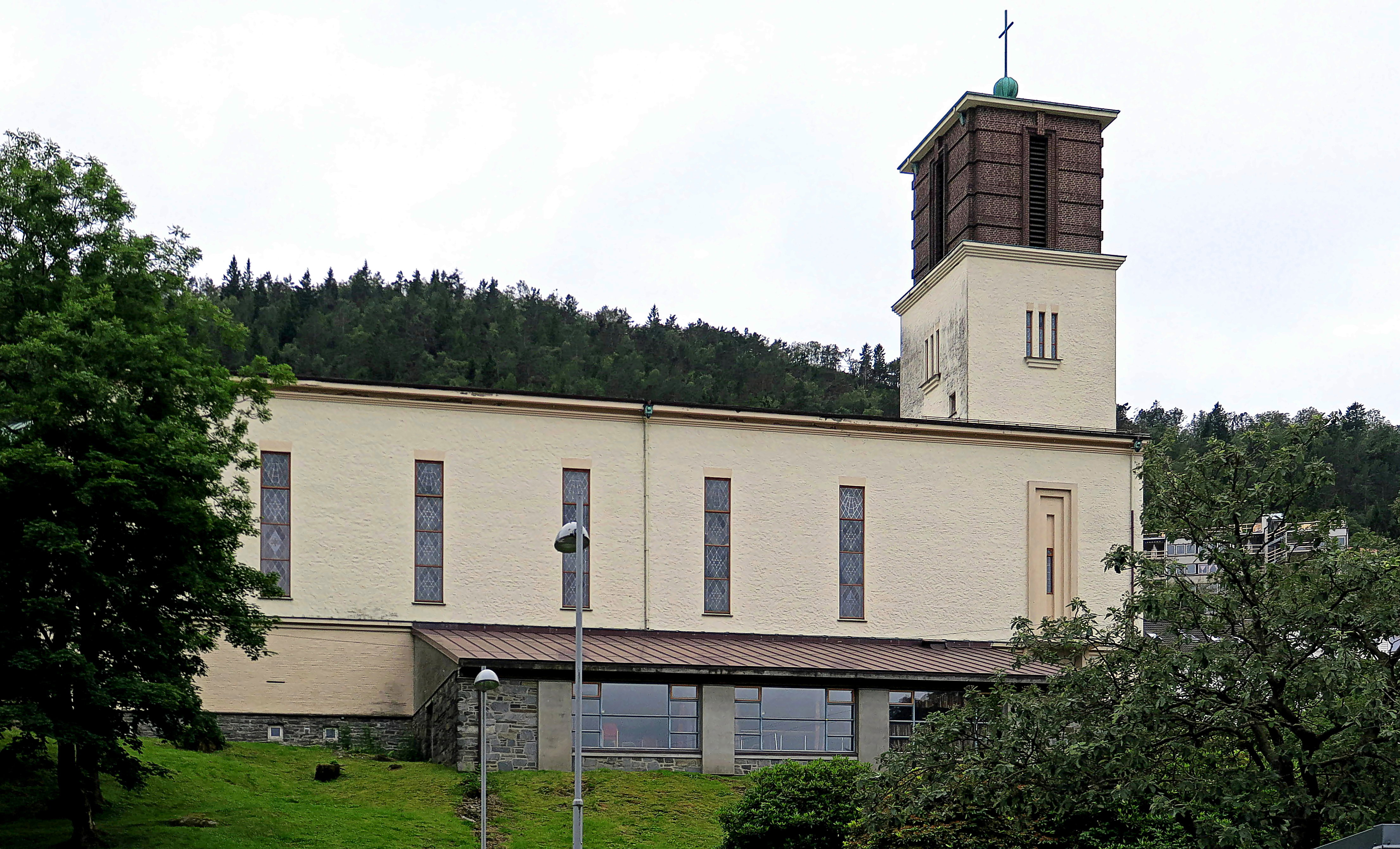

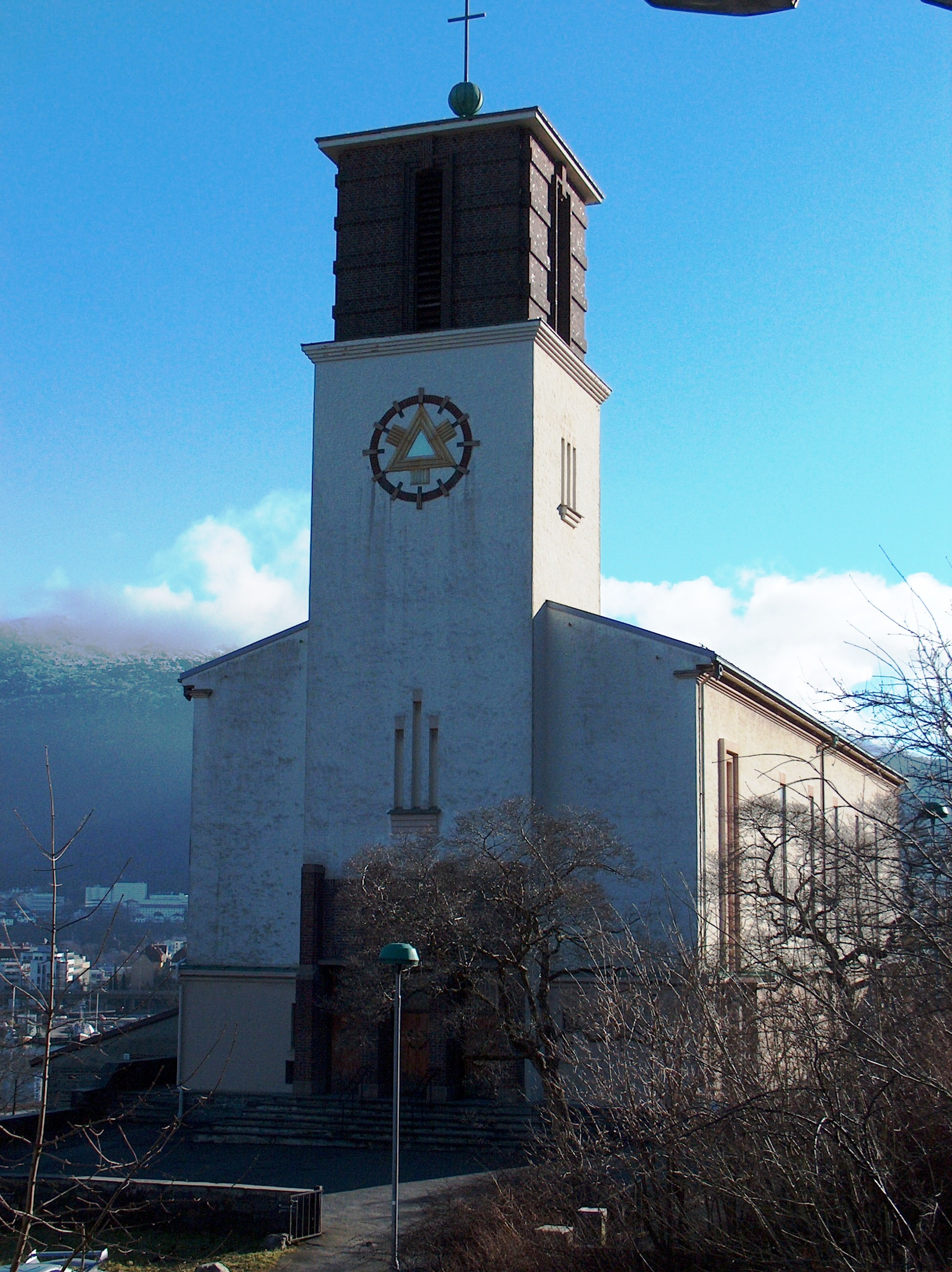

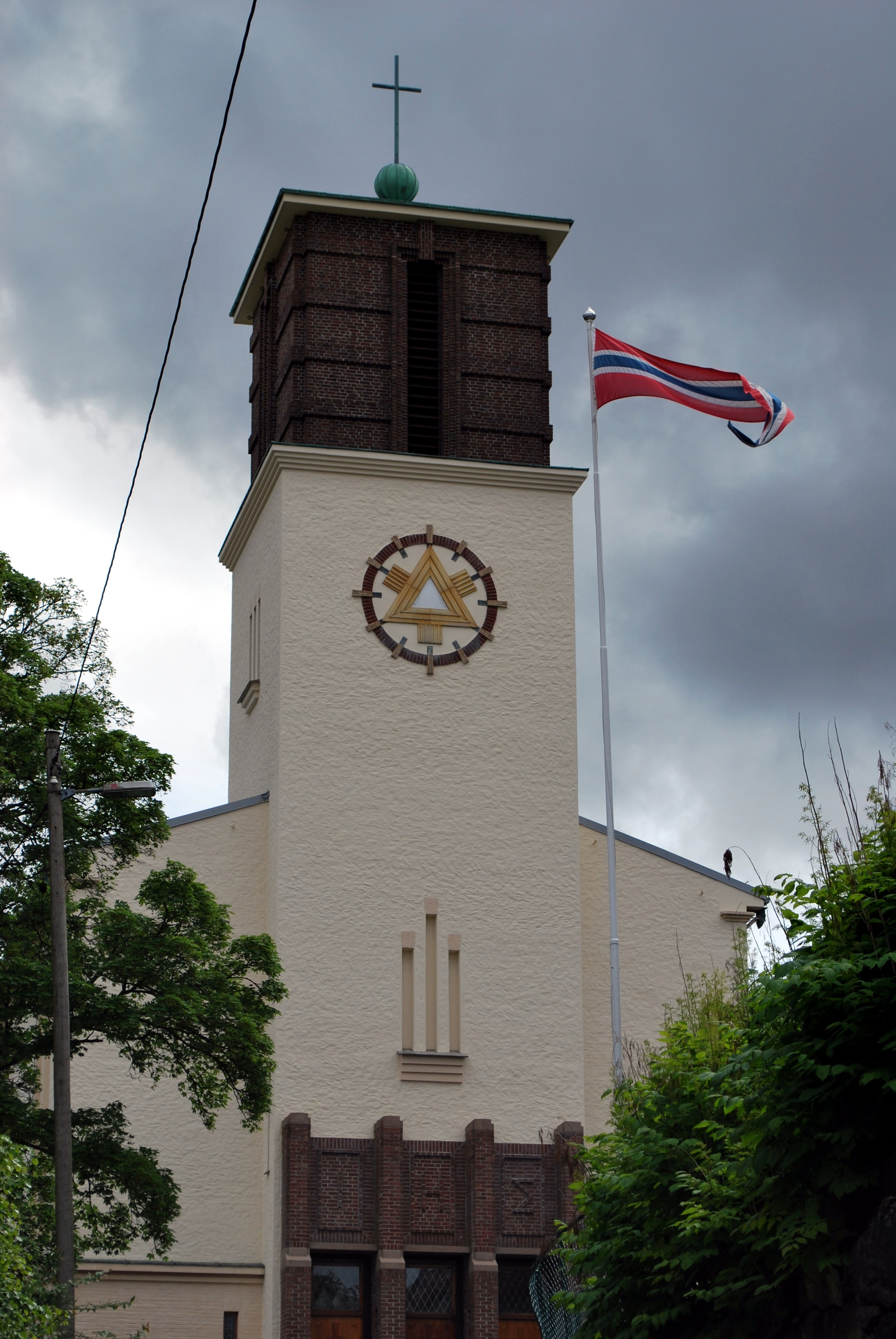

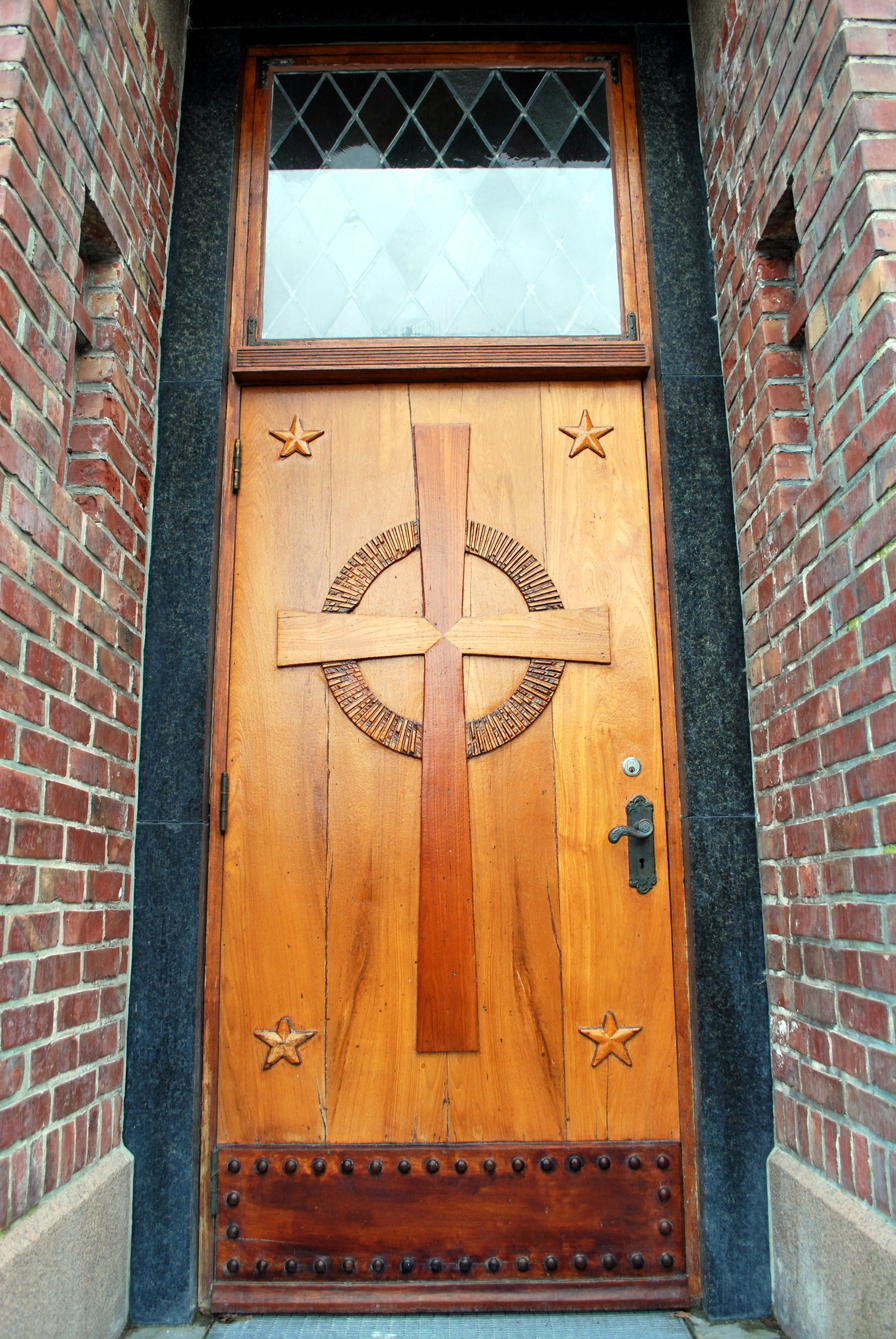

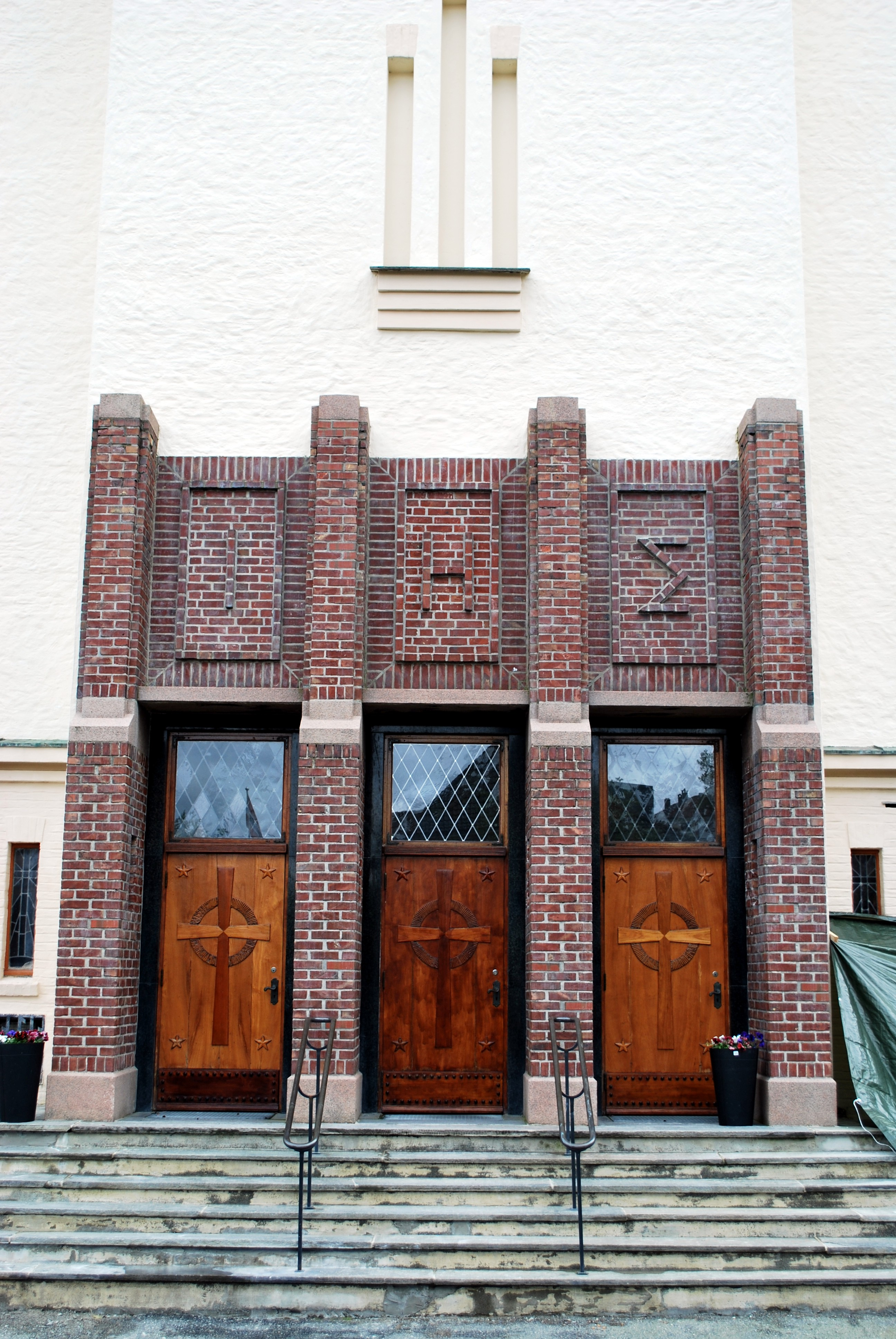

== See also ==
- List of churches in Bjørgvin
