= Anders Nilsen Wiborg =

Norwegian military commander (c. 1655–1718)

- Born: c. 1655; Unknown
- Died: 1718 (aged 62–63)
- Allegiance: Denmark-Norway
- Service years: 1678–1718
- Rank: Major
- Commands: Christiansfjeld Fortress

Anders Nilsen Wiborg (c. 1655 – 1718) was the fourth commander of the Christiansfjeld Fortress in Norway. He commanded from 15 January 1717 until his death at Kongsvinger during the Great Northern War on 10 October 1718.

He became a second lieutenant (Fähnrich) in the Oppland National Infantry Regiment in 1678. This would place his birth about 1655. He became a Sekondløytnanat in the Fåbergske Company in 1682. He became a First Lieutenant in 1685. In 1697 he became a Lieutenant Captain in the South Hedemark National Guard Company. Later that year he became Captain and commander of the Osterdal Company, which was sent to Denmark in 1714 under orders of the Danish King.

Charles XII of Sweden attacked Norway in the summer of 1716; the attack had been expected for a long time. On 15 January 1717 Wiborg returned to Norway, was promoted to Major and made Commandant of Christiansfjeld. His death at Kongsvinger on 10 October 1718 occurred only shortly before Charles XII's death on 30 November 1718, in the siege trenches of the Swedish assault on the Norwegian fortress at Fredriksten.

Anders Wiborg was married twice. His first marriage was to Margrethe Petersdatter Skridshol who was from the Ringsaker Parish in Hedmark County, who bore him eight children. His second marriage was to Margrethe Madfeldt who was from the Romedal Parish who bore his seven children. He also maintained a mistress.
