= Laksevågs Bueskyttere =

Laksevågs Bueskyttere is a Buekorps (Bow Corps or Archery Brigade) in Bergen, founded 8 May 1894.

It is a "Sunday brigade", meaning that they were a brigade for the common people who had their drills on Sundays. They still have their drills and practises on Sundays and the brigade has tight bonds to the urban district Laksevåg. Their uniforms are distinct with white shirts and no coats or jackets.

Except for the foundation day, Midsummer is a big day for the archers. They have in many generations built a large barrel fire in Kirkebukten at Laksevåg. The works starts in the end of May and lasts until the lighting of the fire. The tallest of the fires have reached almost 30 meters.

== History ==
Laksevågs Bueskyttere was founded May 8, 1894. Petter Bøthun and Olaf Nygaard are considered to be the founders of the brigade which took place in Dr. Høygaard's garden, between the old fire station and Laxevaag Maskin & Jernskipsbyggeri. Olaf Nygaard became the first Chief Commander of the brigade.

Others who took part in the foundation were Rasmus Nygård, Nicolai Thorsen, Gustav Ellingsen and Alfred Andersen.

Laksevågs Bueskyttere's uniform was white shirts, black trousers with scarfs and Scot Hats (for the officers), although they rarely could afford such hats. Given that the population at Laksevåg in the late 1800s were very poor, the boys in the brigade could not afford coats or jackets of any kind as the other brigades could. Some even used flour sacks from local bakeries as shirts.

The brigade uses crossbow (bow), wooden shield and axe, spear, halberd, épée, saber and snare drum as their "weapons" and equipment. The brigade was discontinued between 1970 and 1978, but in 1979 one managed to continue the operation. They have their premises in Skolegaten.

== Ranking in Laksevågs Bueskyttere ==
=== Officers ===
- Chief Commander (Sjef)
- First Company Commander
- Main Standard-Bearer (Fanebærer)
- Second Company Commander
- Third Company Commander
- First Drummer (Tambur)
- Adjutant
- First Standard Officer
- Second Standard Officer
- Third Standard Officer
- Fourth Standard Officer
- (Fifth Standard Officer)
- Second Drummer (Oppslager)
- Spear-Bearer (Spydbærer)

=== Non-commissioned officers ===
In theory, the Non-commissioned officers all have the same rank.

- First Company Standard-Bearer
- Second Company Standard-Bearer
- Third Company Standard-Bearer
- Drum Major (Tamburmajor)
- Lead Halberd-Bearer (Ledende Øksebærer)
- Shield-Bearers (Skjoldbærere)
- First Soldier
- Second Soldier
- Third Soldier

== Literature ==
- Gjerstad, Jo. Buekorpsene i Bergen, (Bergen kommune 2005) ISBN 82-7128-383-9 (hefte)
