= Oppland Regiment =

- Active: 1657–2002
- Countries: Norway
- Branch: Norwegian Army
- Type: Infantry
- Garrison/HQ: Christiansfjell Fortress
- Engagements: Northern War of 1655–1660; Scanian War; Great Northern War; Lingonberry War; Napoleonic Wars; Swedish–Norwegian War; Norwegian campaign

The Oppland Regiment was a Norwegian infantry regiment, formed in 1657 and stationed at Elverum. The area of population east of the river Leiret (literally the camp) adjacent to Christiansfjell Fortress was built up by the garrison and supporting merchants and craftsmen, who settled nearby. The regiment was disbanded in 2002.

== Standards ==
Østoppland Infantry Regiment No.5 (1911)

Oppland Regiment (1995)

5th Brigade (1995)
