= Skansens Bataljon =

Youth organization in Bergen, Norway

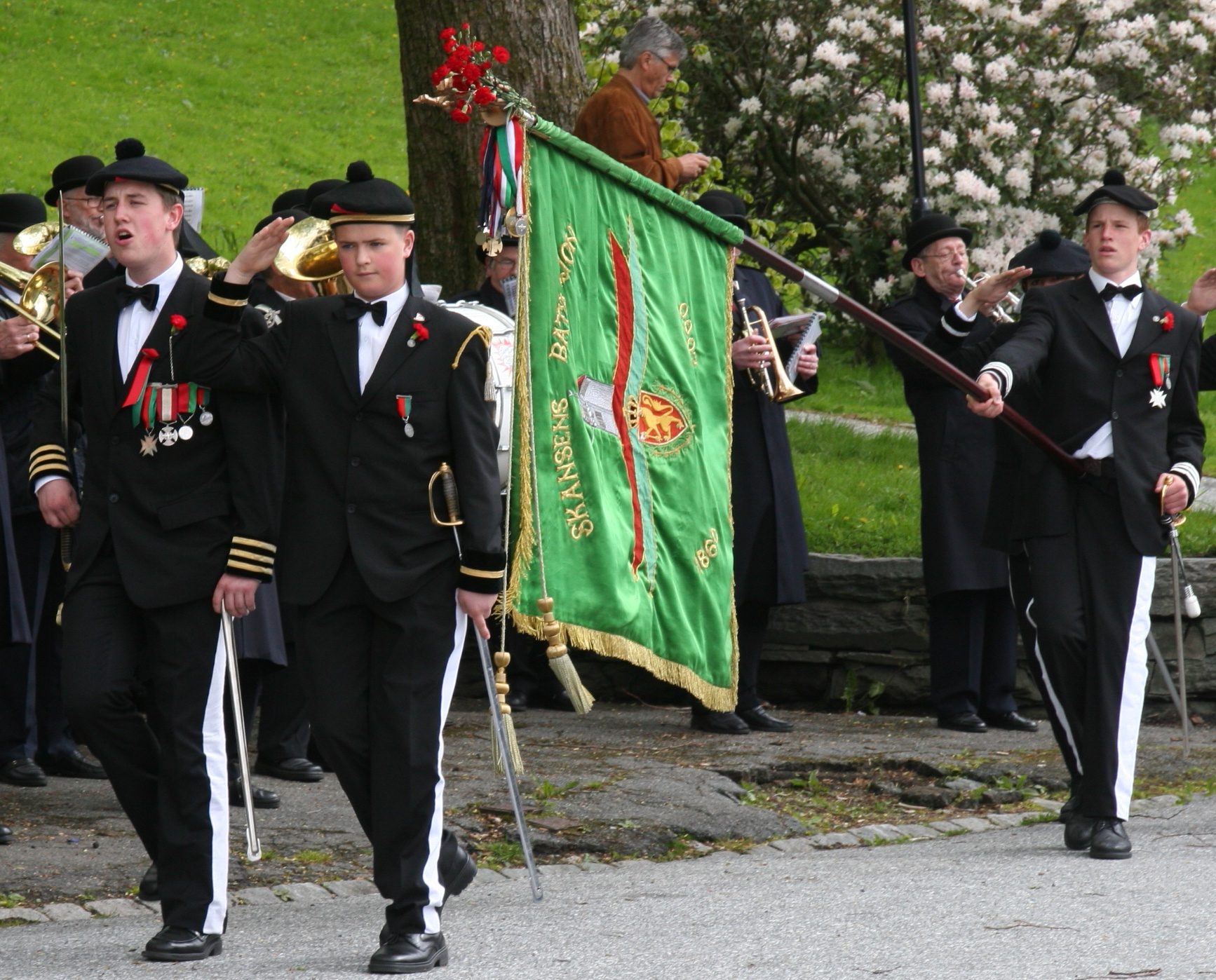

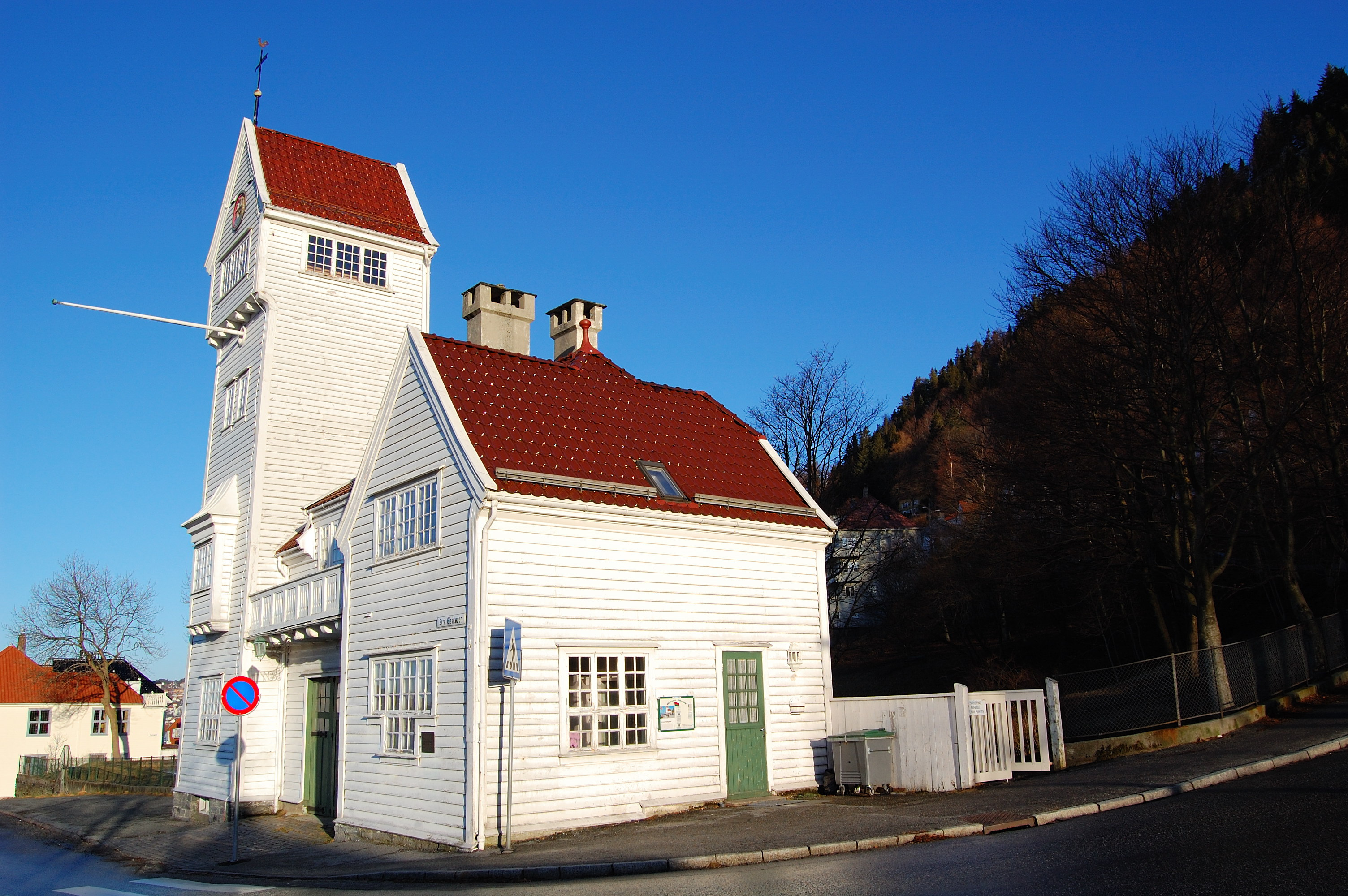
Skansens Bataljon's headquarters in the old fire station at Skansen in Bergen

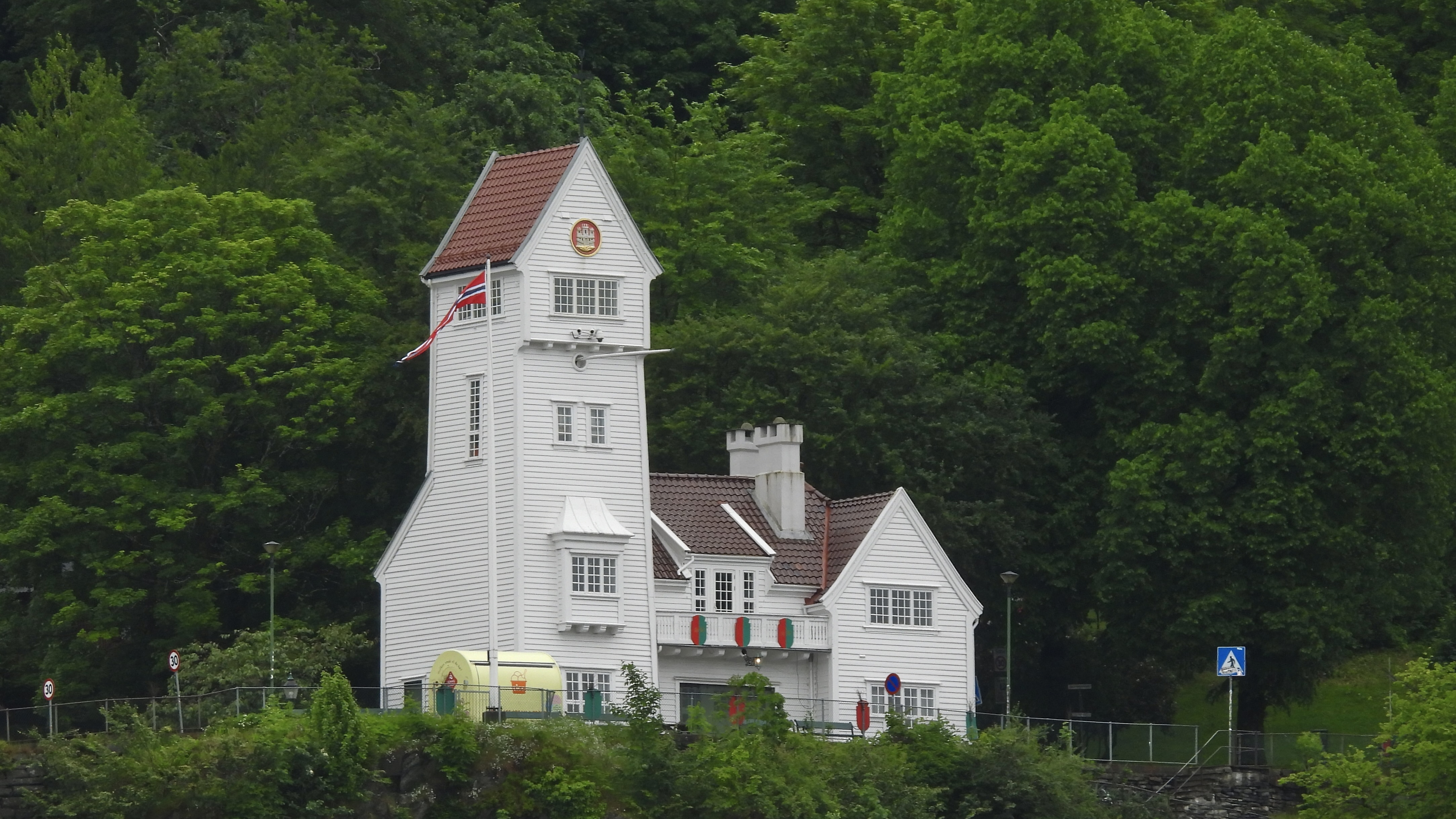
The historic Skansens Fire Station (1903) Bergen, Norway.

Skansens Bataljon is a buekorps in Bergen that was established 22 May 1860. The buekorps has its headquarters in the old fire station at Skansen. Traditionally Skansen marcher on Sundays, but this was changed to Saturdays in 1951.

Skansens Bataljon also runs the café Brushytten at Fløyen which is a popular goal for hikers.
