= Nordnæs Bataillon =

Buekorps in Bergen, Norway

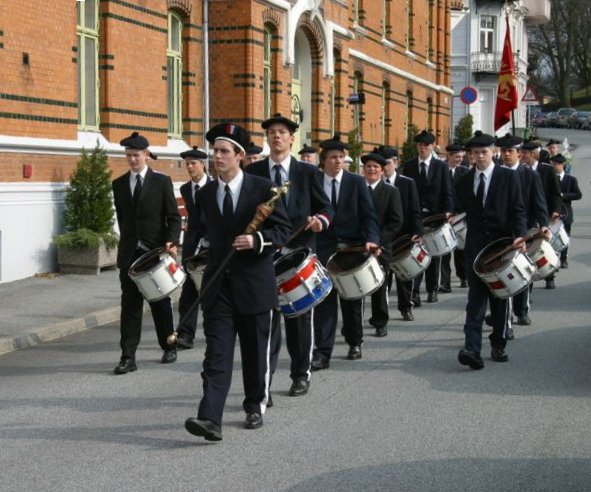

Nordnæs Bataillon is a buekorps in Bergen that was established 3 May 1858. The members primarily come from the eastern side of Nordnes.
