= Olav Djupvik =

Norwegian politician

Olav Djupvik (5 February 1931 – 31 May 2016) was a Norwegian politician with the Christian Democratic Party.

He was born in Blaker as a teacher's son, and spent his professional career as a schoolteacher in Oslo, Askim, Rendalen and Lillehammer. He was a member of the executive committee of the municipal council of Lillehammer Municipality from 1971 to 1979.

He was elected to the Norwegian Parliament from Oppland in 1977, but was not re-elected in 1981.
