= Krohnvikens Bataljon =

Youth organization in Bergen, Norway

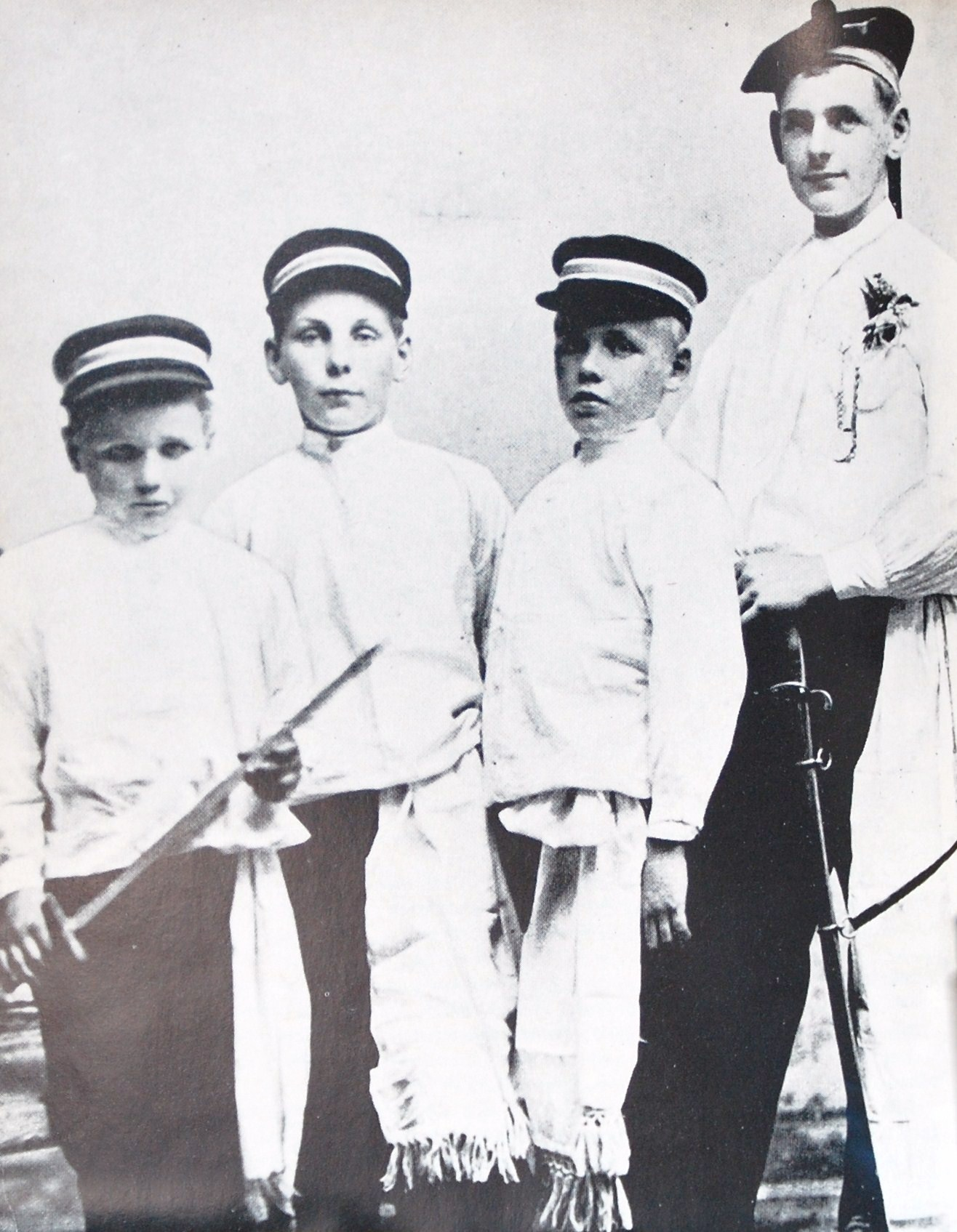
Four brothers of Krohnvikens Bataljon, c. 1899

Krohnvikens Bataljon was a buekorps in Bergen which existed from probably before 1854 (1852?) to 1916. The proof of its early foundation is that the man who allegedly painted its first banner died in that year, 1854. It was the local brigade for a working-class area called Krohnviken, in the neighbourhood of Solheimsviken. The brigade may have been the oldest to ever have come into existence.

The boys in the brigade made their own rifles and its number of members made it at times into a rather large one. A successor to Krohnvikens Bataljon is Løvstakkens Jægerkorps, which was founded for the first time in 1903.

== Sources ==
- Buekorps - Krohnvikens Bataljon

== Bibliography ==
- Sletten, Torstein (1972), Buekorpsene i Bergen: i tekst og bilder gjennom hundre år, ED.B. GIERTSENS FORLAG, ISBN 82-90073-00-3
