= Christiansfjell Fortress =

Fort in Elverum, Innlandet, Norway

Christiansfjeld festning
- Elverum, Norway

Site information
- Type: Fortress
- Controlled by: Norway

Location
- Coordinates: 60°53′02″N 11°34′12″E

Site history
- Built: 1683
- In use: 1683-1742 and 1811-1814
- Materials: Stone

Garrison information
- Past commanders: Jonas Budde; Anders Nilsen Wiborg

Christiansfjeld Fortress is a historic fort located in the town of Elverum which is located in Elverum Municipality in Innlandet county, Norway.

== History ==
The fortress was built on a hill on the east side of the river Glomma as one of several military facilities in the vicinity. The fortress was initially established by Danish officer Gustav Wilhelm Wedel Jarlsberg (1641-1717), Count of Wedel-Jarlsberg in 1683. A tower with a cellar powder magazine was among the first buildings at this Norwegian fortress.

Originally known as Hammersberg Skanse, during King Christian V's 1685 visit to Norway he toured the fortification. Recognizing its strategically important location on the Swedish border, he renamed the fortress Christiansfjeld and directed continued improvements. An extensive report of the visit includes illustrations of the fortress at that time. After the Great Northern War some of the smaller border forts were determined to be more expensive than their utility justified and they were closed. On July 13, 1742 Christiansfjeld Fortress was closed and the materials were moved to the Kongsvinger Fortress.

The fortress never saw combat and had never been besieged. In 1930 the area was cleared as parkland. In 1964, a municipal water tower was built on the site. Today the site is dominated by ruins in a park with a large water tower that supplies Elverum with water.

== Commanding officers ==
- Jonas Budde, (1684-1688)
- Bernt Kretz, (1688-1694)
- Jens Flor, (1695-1710)
- Wilhelm Ernst Levin von Treiden, (1710-1716)
- Anders Nilsen Wiborg, (1717-1718)
- Conrad Kaufmann, (1719-1720)
- Joachim Frederik von Gelhorn, (1720-1727)
- Jens Aamodt, (1727-1729)
- Hans Parelius, (1729-1742)

== Other sources ==
- Kavli, Guthorm (1987). Norges festninger. Oslo: Universitetsforlaget. ISBN 82-00-18430-7.
