= Buekorps =

Youth organization in Bergen, Norway

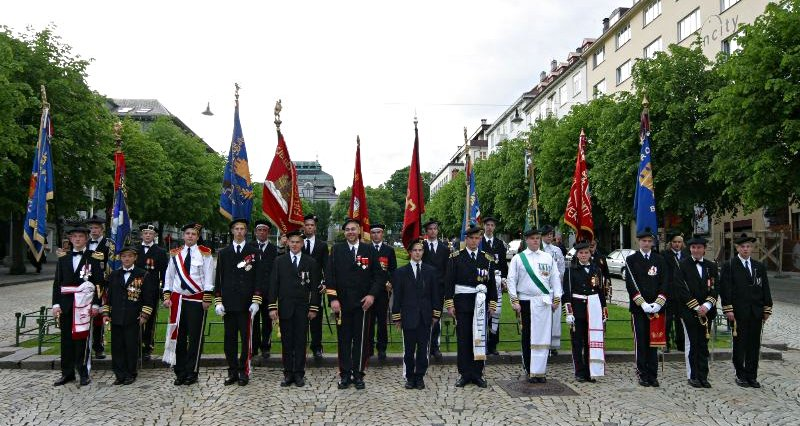
Representatives of the different buekorps brigades in 2005.

Buekorps (Norwegian: [ˈbʉ̂ːəˌkɔrps]; literally "Bow Corps" or "Archery Brigade") are traditional marching neighbourhood youth organizations in Bergen, Norway.

The tradition is unique to Bergen. The organizations, which are called bataljoner (battalions), were first formally organized in the 1850s and are run entirely by the youths themselves. Fourteen different such battalions are active in Bergen, each belonging to a certain part of town.

In the past brigades were also formed in other Norwegian cities, but these were mostly defunct by the early 20th century.

Though the structure and ceremony of the Buekorps has military roots, the brigades are active in various other ways, ranging from physical activity and play to charitable work. Members range in age from about 7 to over 20, and adult veterans play a role in supporting the organizations and during certain events.

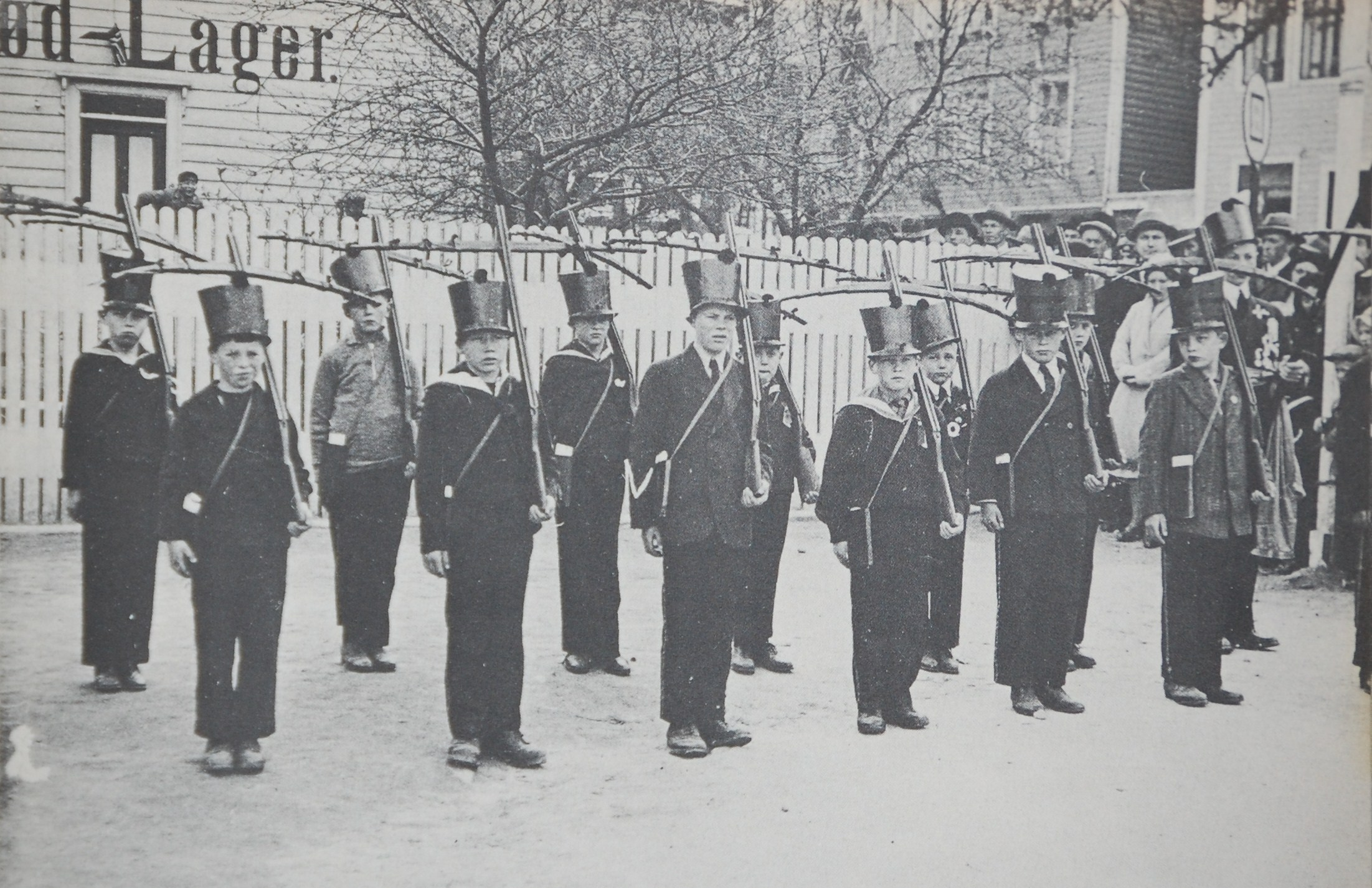
A section of Sandvikens Buekorps in 1932.

The groups consist of privates (usually carrying wooden rifles or crossbows), officers (older children with more seniority) and drummers. The buekorps have their official season from March through the summer, but are most active during spring, with Norwegian Constitution Day on May 17 as the high point of the season. On that day they are a prominent and popular part of the parade through the streets of Bergen.

In addition, the buekorps have their own celebratory days. One of these is the day they celebrate the founding date of their battalion. Every fourth year is Buekorpsenes Dag (The Buekorps Day), a series of competitions and pageantry.

== Background ==
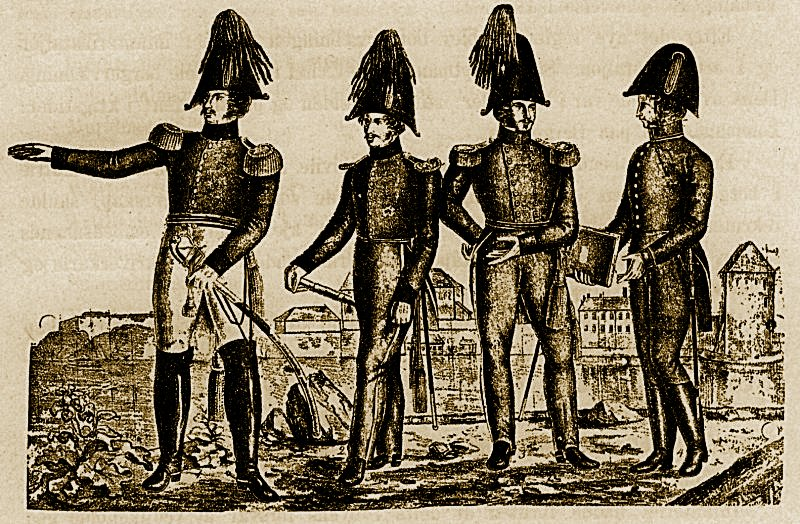
Members of the real city militia which children of Bergen eventually would imitate.

The tradition dates back at least to the 19th century when children would imitate the adult militia soldiers performing close order drill.

Even from back to the days of Ludvig Holberg it is told of boys playing and marching on the streets of Bergen. The city militia fascinated boys in the 18th and 19th century. They would build their own "fortresses" where they would play and engage in "warfare" against other boy-gangs. Consul August Konow tells from his lifetime that at the end of the 18th century there existed boy-gangs and companies who marched around and engaged in "warfare" with each other. These gangs were called "Nordnæs Kompani" and "Nykirkealmeningens Kompani" and were direct copies of the town militia.

Governor Fredrik Hauch also tells from the same time about boy-gangs who were copying the town militia. Names like "fjeldeguttene" ("the Fjeldet-boys"), "markeguttene" ("the Marken-boys") and "dræggaguttene" ("the Dræggen-boys") were known at the end of the 18th century.

Johan Sebastian Welhaven with his poem 'børnelege' (children's games) from 1839 gives a picture of his childhood-years in 1814:
"Vi stilledes os siden i lange Rader, marsjerende tappert i byens gader; vi plyndrede Søstrenes Dukkeskrin og gjorde Mundurer av silke og lin. I krigsraadet taltes med megen vekt om fienden stilling og skjulte planer, paa chefens kommando, vi stormede kjækt med skillingstrompeter, karduspapirfaner".

("We organized ourselves in long rows, marched bravely the streets of the city; we plundered our sisters' doll-boxes and made coats out of silk and linen. In the council of war we gravely discussed the enemy's position and secret plans, and on the command of the chief we charged with shilling trumpets and paper banners".)

Nils Hertzberg says of the 1830s: there were organized boy-gangs in the different neighbourhoods which under changing alliances gave each other full-blown battles: the Nordnæs-, Drægge-, Nøste- and Skive-Boys. They employed guards and scouts who made strategic moves to surprise the enemy.

In the 1850s these boy-gangs still rampaged, but the violence and hostility had to come to an end. Who it was that finally ended these hostilities and turned them into the current peaceful pursuits of the buekorps is uncertain.

== History ==
Traditionally an activity exclusively for boys, the first girl buekorps was formed in 1991. This stirred some controversy in Bergen, but the girl and mixed gender battalions are now accepted by most people.

The buekorps tradition, even with many battalions experiencing trouble in keeping up the recruiting of new members, continues to be a popular and proud feature of Bergen, except the complaint about noise.

=== Lørdagskorps and Søndagskorps ===
Lørdagskorps ("Saturday-brigades") and Søndagskorps ("Sunday-brigades") are historically the two main types of buekorps. These terms originate from the day the brigades marched on. Saturday-brigades were composed of the sons of those who could afford to take a day off on Saturday to march. The three surviving Saturday-brigades are Nordnæs Bataillon, Nygaards Bataljon and Dræggens Buekorps.

Sunday-brigades were the ones from working-class neighbourhoods where the children had to work on Saturdays, and thus could not march on any other day. Most of the brigades were Sunday-brigades. Some of these brigades came from such poor families that they could not afford real uniforms, wearing instead ornate shirts. Today, Laksevågs Bueskyttere and Løvstakkens Jægerkorps still march in these shirts.

== The current brigades ==
- Dræggens Buekorps (24 March 1856), – Dræggens Archery Company, boys brigade
- Eidsvaags Kompani (28 April 2008) "Eidsvaags Værve Kompani", Boys brigade.
- Fjeldets Bataljon (22 May 1857), Fjeldets Battalion, boys brigade
- Laksevågs Bueskyttere (8 May 1894), Laksevåg's Archerers, boys brigade
- Lungegaardens Buekorps (7 October 1994), Lungegaarden's Archery Company, girls brigade
- Løvstakkens Jægerkorps (11 May 1903-18, 30 April 1928-64, 11 May 1999-), Løvstakken's Jeger Company, mixed brigade
- Markens Bataljon (4 June 1859), Marken's Battalion, boys brigade
- Mathismarkens Bataljon (15 June 1887), Mathismarken's Battalion, boys brigade
- Nordnæs Bataillon (3 May 1858), Nordnæs' Battalion, boys brigade
- Nygaards Bataljon (14 June 1857), Nygaard's Battalion, boys brigade
- Sandvikens Bataljon (17 May 1857), Sandviken's Battalion, boys brigade
- Skansens Bataljon (22 May 1860), Skansen's Battalion, boys brigade
- Skutevikens Buekorps (8 July 1853), Skuteviken's Archery Company, boys brigade
- Sydnæs Bataljon (7 June 1863), Sydnæs' Battalion, boys brigade
- Wesselengens Bataljon (24 April 1873), Wesselengen's Battalion, boys brigade

== Former brigades in Bergen ==
Since the 1850s there may have existed more than 200 different brigades overall. Dates of foundation and discontinuation are often unknown. Known brigades are listed here:

- Allegatens Bataljon
- Asylplass Bataljon
- Baglergatens Kompani (1911-18?)
- Baneveiens Bataljon
- Bingen Hellebardkorps
- Bingen Jegerkorps
- Blauengens Kompani
- Blekebakkens Kompani
- Bispengens Kompani
- Bjørgvin Compagni (1869)
- Bjørgvins Kompani (1932–36)
- Boligens Kordekorps (Ladegårdskorpset) (?-1895)
- Boligens Kårdekorps (Henrik Wergelands korpset) (?-1888)
- Borgerskolens (Buekorps?)
- Breistølsveiens Kompani (1889-1925?)
- Bødkergadens Kompagni
- Bønes Batalion
- Christinegaard Bataljon (1938–40)
- Damsgårds Batalion
- Det raske Fjellkorps (1876–79)
- Dokkens Kompagni
- Dragefjellskorpset (1881-?)
- Eidemarkens (Buekorps?)
- Ekrenbakkens Kompani
- Elvegatens Kompagni
- Engens Buekorps
- Fastings Buekorps (?-1860s?)
- Fjeldets Kompani (1895-?)
- Fjellborgs Kompani (1924–29)
- Fjøsanger Kompani (1950-60s?)
- Fredrikbergsgatens Kompani
- Fridalens Kompani (1950s?)
- Fæstningens Buekorps (?-1862)
- Granbakken Jægerkorps
- Granesmugets Kompani (1913-39?)
- Grønnevoldgatens Kompagni
- Grønnevolds Kompagni
- Gyldenpris Kompani
- Gørbitzgatens Kompani
- Hans Haugesgate Kompani (1920–33)
- Haugens Bataljon
- Haugens Buekorps
- Haugesmugets Kompani
- Haugeveiens Kompani
- Heiens Kompani
- Holmens Kompani
- Hop Bataljon (1918–22)
- Høggeblokkens Kompani (1912-20?)
- Isdalens Kårdekorps
- Jektevikens Kompani
- Kalmarhavens Compagni
- Kippersmauets Bataljon (1930–33)
- Kirkegatens Jægerkorps (1920–47)
- Kleivens Buekorps (1850s?-?)
- Klokkerhagens Kompani
- Korskirkealmeningens Kompani (1904?-13)
- Krohnengens Bataljon
- Krohnvikens Bataljon (1852–1916)
- Kronstad Bataljon (1922–63)
- Ladegaardens Bataljon (21 April 1880-85, 1889–1921, 1924–70)
- Ladegårdens Compagni (1891-1917?)
- Laksevåg Bataljon (1872–1940)
- Langeveiens Kompani (1920–26)
- Langhauens Kompani
- Legdenes Kompani (1 April 1956-61)
- Lille Markens Kompagni
- Lille Dræggens Buekorps
- Løvstakkveien Kompani
- Markeveiens Compagni
- Markeveiens Jægerkorps (1880s)
- Martin Vahlsgates Kompani (1901–28)
- Meyermarkens Kompani (1905–20)
- Minde Bataljon (1950s?)
- Mulelvens Bataljon
- Mulens Bataljon (14 June 1898 – 1903, 1911–17, 1920–57, 1980–84)
- Muralmendingens Companie (1880s)
- Møhlenpris Kompani (1895–1912, ?-1923)
- Natland Bataljon (1959–63)
- Nedre Stølens Kompani (1898-1904?)
- Nessets Bataljon
- Nordnes Lekeplads Kompani (1918–28)
- Nordre Møhlenpris Kompani
- Nordre Skutevikens Kompani (1928–39)
- Nordre Skuteviksveiens Kompani (1928–39)
- Nye Sandviksvei Kompani
- Nykirkealmeningens Kompani (1875?-1916)
- Nymarks Kompani
- Nøstets Batalion (7 May 1870 – 1961)
- Nøstets Kårdekorps (bef. 1855-70)
- Olav Rustiesgates Kompani (1972–80)
- Paaschemarkens Bataljon
- Paradis Bataljon
- Parkens Compagni
- Persenbakkens Kompani (1928–32)
- Planens Kompani (1956–65, 1974–82)
- Rennebanens Kompani (1920-25?)
- Repslagersgatens Jægerkompani (1918–38)
- Rosenbergsgatens Bataljon
- Rothaugens Kompani (1932–34, 1988-90?)
- Sandviksveiens Buekorps
- Scjadenbergshavens Kompani (1910–30)
- Skanseliens Kompani (1932-57?)
- Skivens Kårdekorps
- Skytterbanens bataljon
- Slettens Bataljon (1959-65?)
- Slottsgatens Kompani
- Smaa-Skansens Bataljon
- Smørsalmendingens Companie (1880s)
- Solheims Bataljon (1927-30s, 1946-50s)
- Storemøllens Compani
- Strandveiens Bataillon
- Strandgatens Jægerkorps
- Strangehagens Kompani
- Stupets Bataljon (1952–56)
- Stølens Kompani (1860-65?, 1947–48)
- Svanevikens Kompani
- Sverresborg Jegerkorps (1902–12)
- Sverresgatens Jægerkorps
- Sydnæskleivens Kårdekorps
- Tamburengens Jægerkorps (1904-10?)
- Teatergatens (Kompani?)
- Toldbodalmendingens Compagni
- Trangesmauets Kompani (1875?-1932)
- Tverrgatens Kompani (1918–31, 1955–57)
- Utsiktens Kompani (1974–75)
- Vardens Kompagni (1965–75)
- Vaskerelvssmugets Compagnie
- Verftets Kompani (1871–73, 18 March 1894 – 1961)
- Verftets Kompani II (1874-?)
- Verftets Kårdekorps (1873–74)
- Victor Müllers (Buekorps?)
- Vognstølbakken Bataljon
- Vågens Bataljon (1 June 1991 – 27 April 2008)
- Ytre Sandvikens Bataljon
- Øvregadens Buekorps (1875-1912?)

== Former brigades in other cities ==
In the past there have also existed buekorps in other cities. However, they were mostly defunct by the early 20th century. It is somewhat uncertain to what degree all of these were to the original tradition of buekorps. They did anyway start after inspiration of the buekorps of Bergen. Known ones are listed here:

Arendal

- Arendals Yngre Guttekompani

Bodø

- Bodø Guttekorps

Drammen

- Bragerøens Buekorps
- Guttekorpset Birkebeineren
- St. Olafklevens Buekorps

Flekkefjord

- 1:ste Buekorps Flekkefjord
- Fjeldgatens Guttekorps
- Flekkefjord Buekorps

Fredrikstad

- Fredrikstad Buekorps

Gjøvik

- Gjøvik Guttekorps

Grimstad

- Grimstad Guttekorps

Hamar

- Hamar Guttegarde

Haugesund

- Grønhaugens Turnforening (buekorps)
- Haraldsgadens Buekorps
- Hasseløens Buekorps
- Haugesunds Buekorps
- Haugesunds Garde
- Risøens Buekorps

Hemnesberget

- Hemnes Guttekorps

Kristiansund

- Storgatens Guttekorps

Levanger

- Levanger Buekorps

Molde

- Molde Guttekorps

Nordfjordeid

- Eids Guttegarde
- Eids Guttekorps

Oslo

- Christiania Garde
- Løven (1868-?)
- Urania Garde (?-1905)

Sandnes

- Sandnes Buekorps

Sandnessjøen

- Sandnessjøen Guttekorps

Stavanger

- Kongsgaard Buekorps
- Nylunds Buekorps
- Stavanger Buekorps
- Svithuns Buekorps

Steinkjer

- Nordsiden Buekorps
- Stenkjær Guttekorps

Tingvoll

- Tingvolds Guttekorps

Tromsø

- Tromsø Guttekorps

Vardø

- Løvepatruljen

Volden

- Voldens Guttekorps

Ålesund

- Rød Garden Tiger
- Viking Garden
- Aalesunds Garde
