= Fortification Upgrades =

Re-organization of military forces in Norway

Coordinates: 59°54′27″N 10°44′12″E

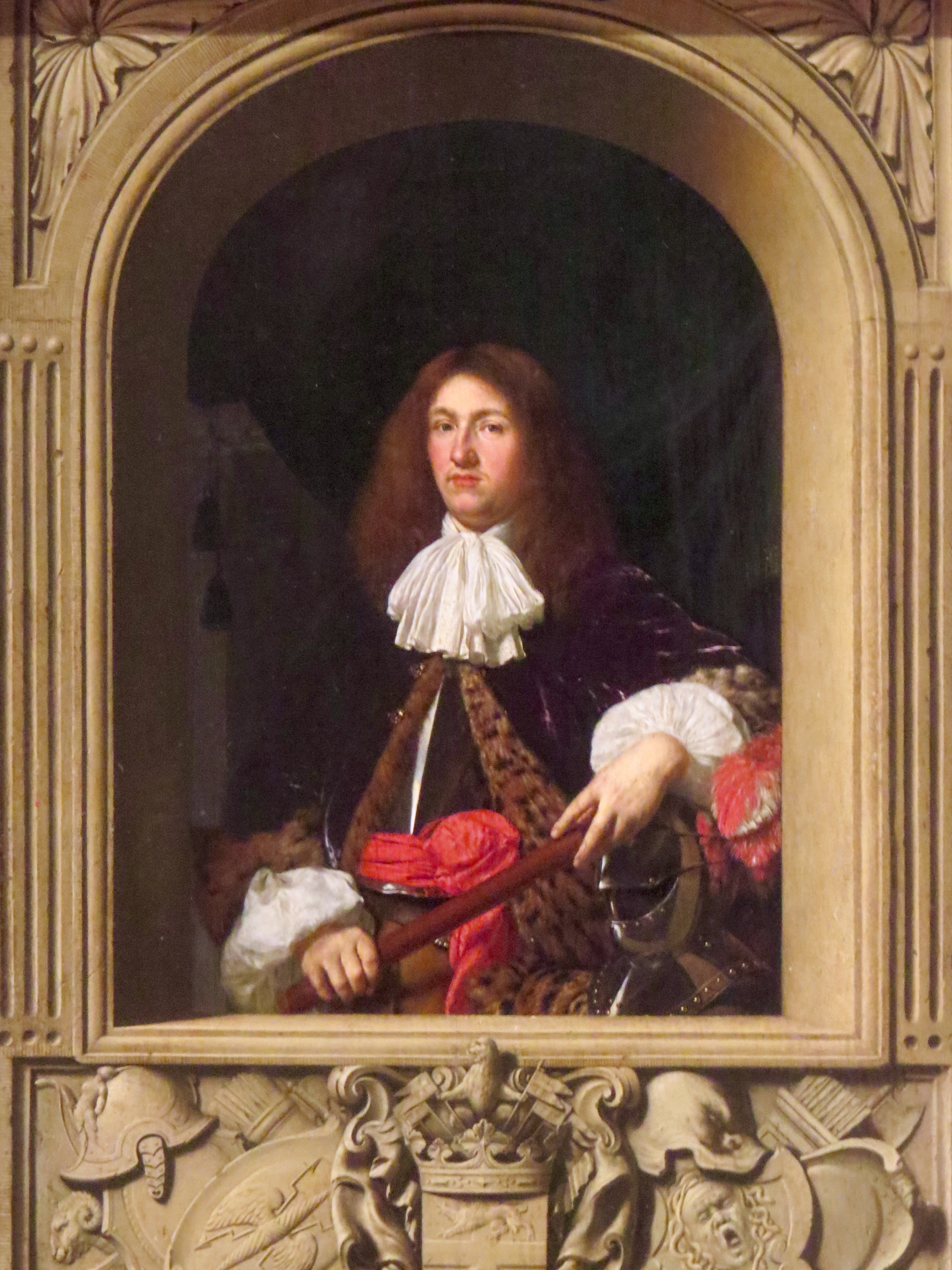
Ulrik Frederik Gyldenløve (1662) by Frans van Mieris (National Gallery of Denmark)

Fortification Upgrades (1673–1675) was a re-organization of military forces and strengthening of the defenses of Norway. The Norwegian army in this period became much better prepared for conflict with Sweden than in any previous period. It numbered 12,000 men in five regiments of infantry, 6 companies of cavalry, and an artillery division with 76 field pieces. An additional Norwegian regiment was serving in Denmark.

Ulrik Frederik Gyldenløve, Count of Laurvig was dispatched to Norway to evaluate the military forces in Norway. Gyldenløve was appointed Governor-general of Norway (Statholder) from January 1664 and commander-in-chief of the Norwegian army two years later. In 1673, Gyldenløve conducted a tour of facilities, after which he recommended upgrades to both the fortresses and the military forces. During the summer of 1675, 1800 men were kept at work on the fortresses at Akershus, Fredrikstad, and Fredriksten.

== Other source ==
- Gjerset, Knut (1915) History of the Norwegian People (New York: The Macmillan Company )
- Bain, Robert N. (1905) Scandinavia: A Political History of Denmark, Norway and Sweden from 1513 to 1900 (Cambridge: Cambridge University Press)
