= Guthorm Kavli =

Norwegian architect and art historian

- Born: May 15, 1917; Trondheim, Norway
- Died: June 1, 1995 (aged 78)
- Education: Dr. Techn. (1967)
- Alma mater: Norwegian Institute of Technology; Uppsala University
- Occupations: Architect; art historian; museum administrator; army officer
- Known for: Member of the Monuments Men; administrator of the Royal Palace, Oslo (1962–1987)

Guthorm Kavli (15 May 1917 – 1 June 1995) was a Norwegian architect and art historian.

== Biography ==
Kavli was born in Trondheim, Norway. He received a degree in architecture from the Norwegian Institute of Technology in 1941 and a degree in art history from Uppsala University in 1946. He was awarded the Doctor of Technology degree at the Norwegian Institute of Technology in 1967.

During the Norwegian campaign in spring 1940 - Kavli from 9 April to 5 May - joined Major Reidar Holtermann together with over other 200 volunteer soldiers in The Battle of Hegra. His brother Wilhelm Kavli also was among Holtermanns menn. (5.)

During the Occupation of Norway by Germany during World War II, he joined the Free Norwegian forces in Scotland and later joined the Norwegian High Command in London. Kavli served as an Officer with the Norwegian Army from 1942 to 1945. Kavli was one of the members of the Monuments Men (M.F.A.A.), who sought to protect European art treasures during and after the war. After the liberation of Norway, he worked for the National Museum of Art, Architecture and Design in Oslo from 1950 to 1961. He held the position as administrator at the Royal Palace, Oslo from 1962 to 1987.

His doctoral thesis was Trønderske trepaléer: borgerlig panelarkitektur nordenfjells. Other important works include Norwegian Architecture, Past and Present (1958), Norges festninger: fra Fredriksten til Vardøhus (1987) and 25 år på kongens slott (1992).
