= Elm Conflict =

1971 protest in Stockholm, Sweden

- Date: 11–12 May 1971
- Location: Kungsträdgården metro station, Kungsträdgården, Stockholm, Sweden
- Methods: Demonstration; Civil disobedience; Picketing; Direct action
- Result: Subway station moved east

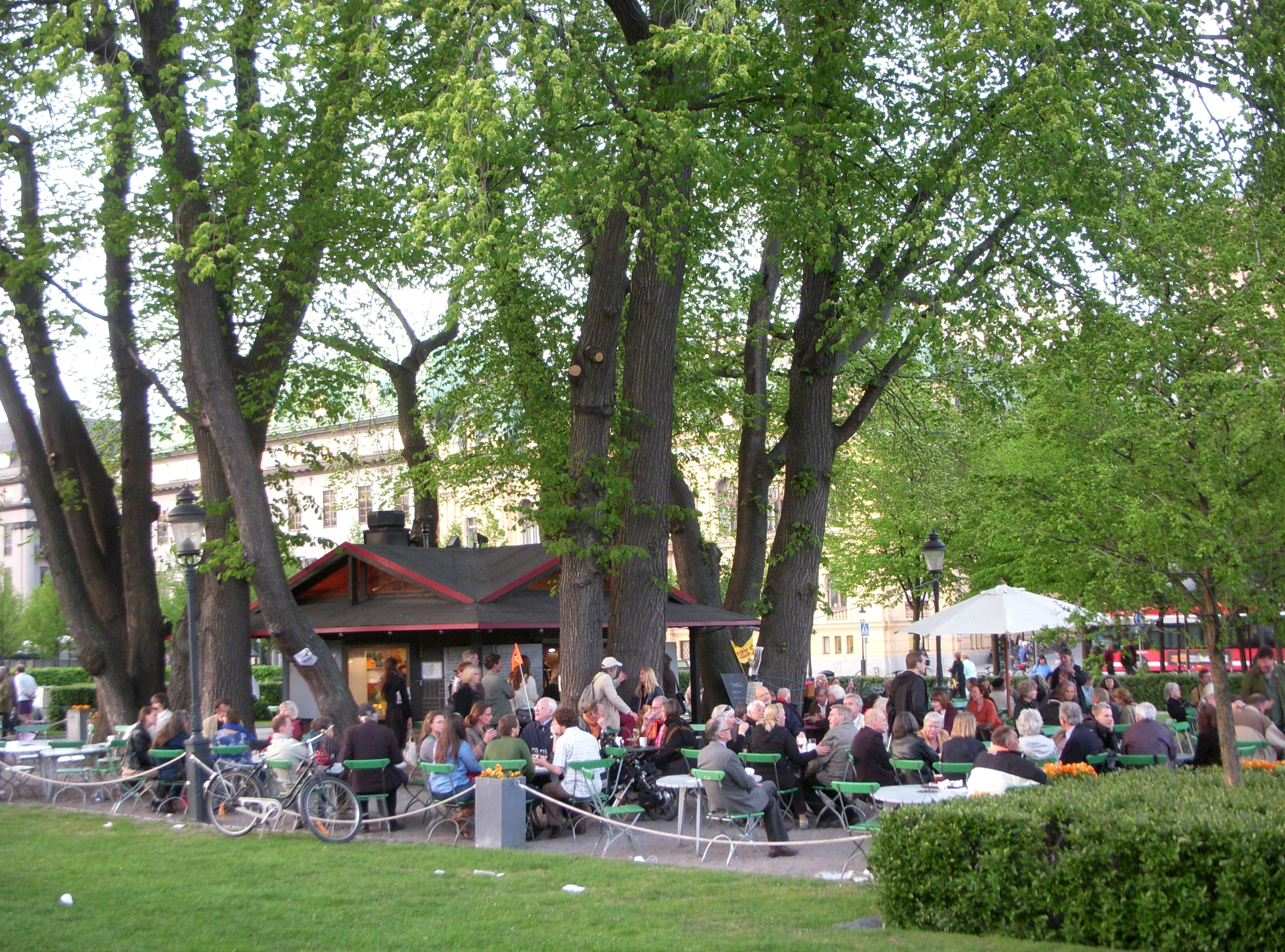
The Scots elms at Erik Glemmes teahouse on the 40th anniversary of Almstriden, 11 May 2011

The Elm Conflict (Swedish: Almstriden), also known as the Battle of the Elms (Swedish: Slaget om almarna), was a dispute and public protest on 11–12 May 1971. Organised by Alternativ stad (the Stockholm branch of Friends of the Earth), the dispute centred on the planned destruction of 13 Scots elm trees located at the entrance to the Kungsträdgården metro station in Kungsträdgården, Stockholm, Sweden. Under the elms was an outdoor coffee house, popular among the youth at the time. The Stockholm city council, supported by the Swedish government, proposed cutting down the trees to prevent damage to the nearby subway.

The Elm Conflict led to an examination of the need for citizens to have more input into the decision-making process of the city council, and received significant attention in Sweden's national media.

== Background ==
Since the 1940s a huge redevelopment scheme had been going on in Stockholm city center, Norrmalm. The idea was that the main corporations needed centrally located head offices. Already around 1960, when much of Norrmalm was a big hole, it was clear that they wouldn't, but instead of shelving the scheme the city authorities went on, to the growing opposition of many citizens.

In 1970, subway construction workers found a crack in the subway structure in the vicinity of the Scots elms. Officials decided that undertaking repairs would be too difficult, so they proposed cutting down the trees and placing the entrance to the new subway station at that location. Stockholm parks manager Holger Blom noted that because of their age, the trees would not last much longer regardless. Stockholm politicians and technicians tried to persuade the citizens via an advertising campaign that the trees needed to be removed. The city council voted 63 to 34 in favour of removing the trees. On 23 April 1971, Prime Minister Olof Palme's government approved the final plans for the new subway station at Kungsträdgården.

== Protests ==
On 12 May, nearly 1,000 citizens of Stockholm gathered in a demonstration against the removal of the Scots elms. Protest tents were erected in the vicinity of the trees.

The protests were well-organised. The protesters made phone lists (an early form of the smart mob technique of public mobilisation) in case the police entered the tent camps. Some people climbed the trees to deter workers from chopping them down. The situation escalated when government officials started chainsawing the trees under the protection of police. At one point, officers on horseback charged the demonstrators. Singer Cornelis Vreeswijk was present at the protest, singing songs and offering support. The protests were covered extensively in the press.

== Aftermath ==
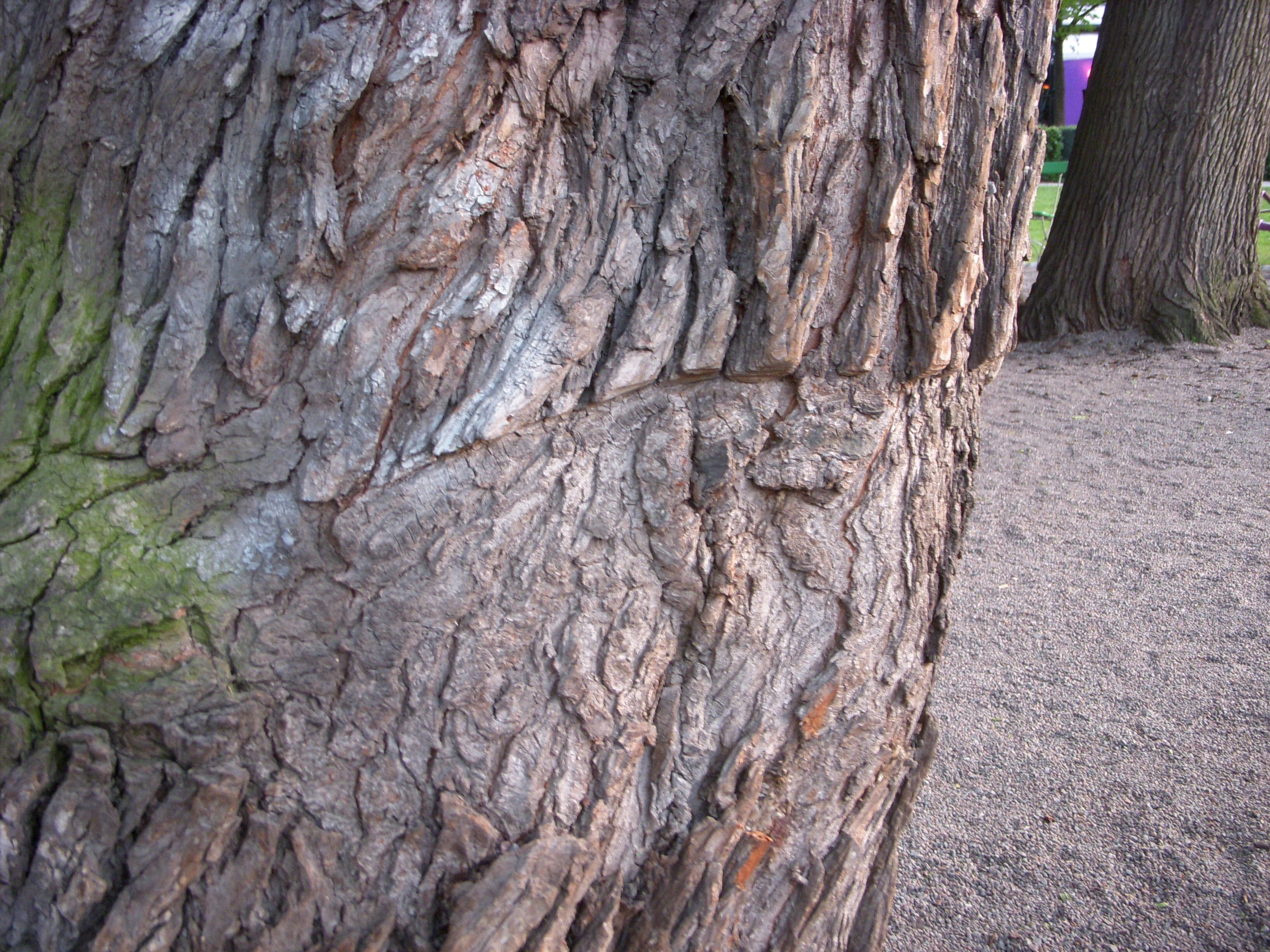
Marks from a chainsaw are still visible in 2011, 40 years after the event.

The protesters were criticised in the media for being uncivil and undemocratic. As a result of the protests, the entry to the new subway station was moved east to a private property at Arsenalgatan 10. Most of the Scots elms remain at the site as of 2014, though a few were chopped down by government officials before the protesters stopped further work. The protests and the outcome are considered a turning point in the redevelopment of Norrmalm and have contributed to more attention being paid by the Swedish government to public demands and questions.

A 40th anniversary commemoration of the Elm Conflict was held on 11 May 2011.
