= Alternativ stad =

Alternativ stad ("Alternative City") is the Stockholm branch of Friends of the Earth. It was founded in 1969 as a movement against urban renewal in Stockholm city center. It organized a successful battle against police to save a popular outdoor café, "the Battle of the Elms" in 1971, which took out most of the vigour from the renewal project. The group organized some of the first Reclaim the Streets (1970) and Critical Mass (1971, 1991) actions. The group has campaigned against motorways since then, and sponsored European Youth For Action (1984), a SEED (1990), 50 Years Is Enough (1992), and the EuroMarch Against Unemployment (1997) as well as domestic campaigns against privatizations and for the welfare state (late 1990s, early 2000s).

Alternativ Stad was always a troublesome member of the environmental movement since it never highlighted medical or chemical issues or arguments, but always social and cultural, considering itself to be rather a defender of the commons rather than the environment.

== Sources ==
- Stahre, Ulf (1999): Den alternativa staden, Stockholmia, ISBN 91-7031-093-9
- Stahre, Ulf (2007): Den globala staden, Atlas, ISBN 978-91-85677-58-0
