= Johan Peter Molin =

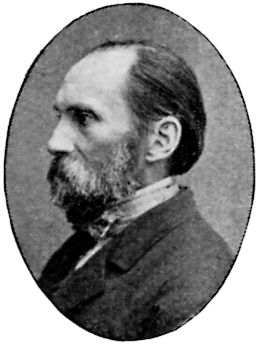
Johan Peter Molin

Johan Peter Molin (born 17 March 1814 – 29 July 1873) was a Swedish sculptor.

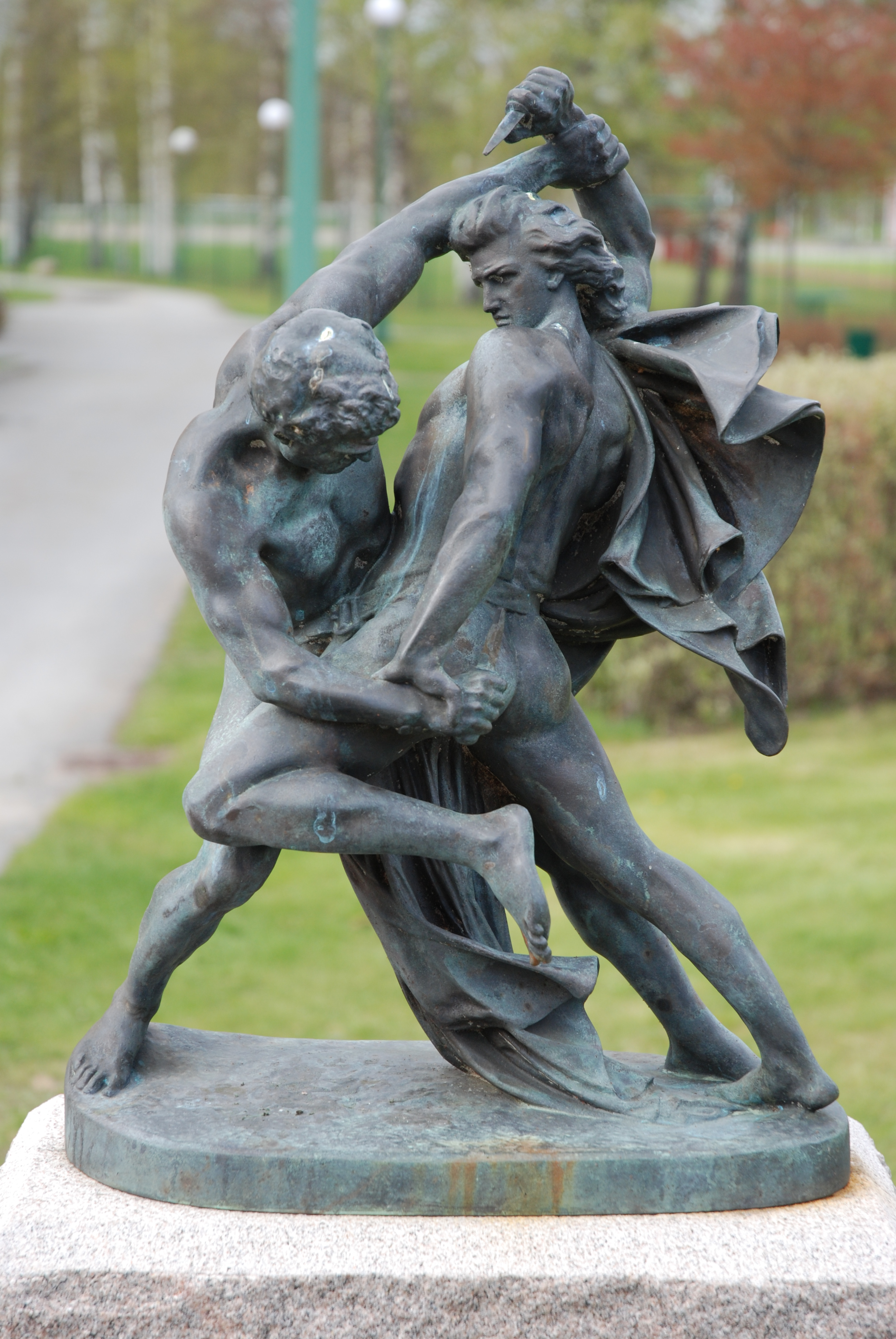
Bältesspännarna – The Knife Wrestlers

== Life ==
Johan Peter Molins was born on 17 March 1814 in Gothenburg, Sweden. His father was the baker Anders Molin, who lived in Gothenburg.

In 1843, Molin travelled to Copenhagen to study with Herman Wilhelm Bissen.

Later he lived in Paris, and spent eight years in Rome. From 1853 he taught at the Royal Swedish Academy of Fine Arts and two years later he was appointed professor in sculpting.

In 1859 he completed the sculpture The Knife Wrestlers ("Bältespännarna"). Copies of this work exist in Gothenburg, in Stockholm and in other Swedish cities. His statue of Karl XII was unveiled in 1868 in Kungsträdgården in Stockholm, where also the Molin fountain is located. Some of his work was exhibited in London and Paris.

Molin won awards from the Order of Vasa, from the Order of the Polar Star, from the Order of St. Olav and from Pour le Mérite.

He died on 29 July 1873 in Ekudden, near Vaxholm.

== Works ==
- Karl XII, bronze, 1868, located in Kungsträdgården in Stockholm
- David med sin slunga, Marmor, Stockholm Palace, Stockholm
- Fountain, bronze, Kungsträdgården in Stockholm
- Fountain, bronze, Rådhusparken in Jönköping
- Johan Anders Wadman, bronze bust, Göteborg
- Bältesspännarna, bronze, in the park in front of the Swedish National Museum in Stockholm, in Bältesspännarparken in Gothenburg and in Mästarnas park in Hällefors

Some of his works are displayed at the Gothenburg Museum of Art, at Vänersborgs museum and at Kalmar konstmuseum, among other places

== Gallery ==
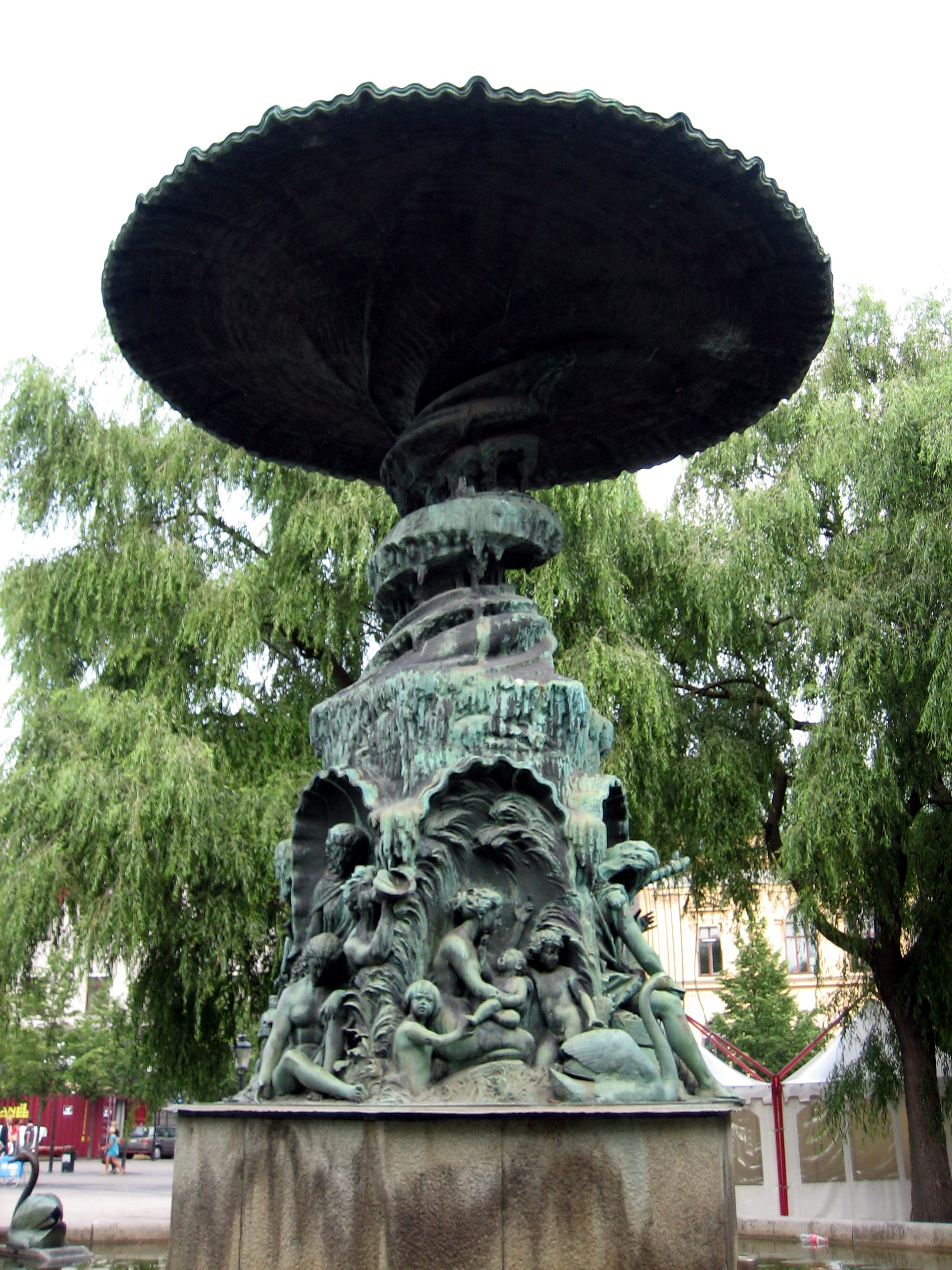
Molins fountain in Stockholm

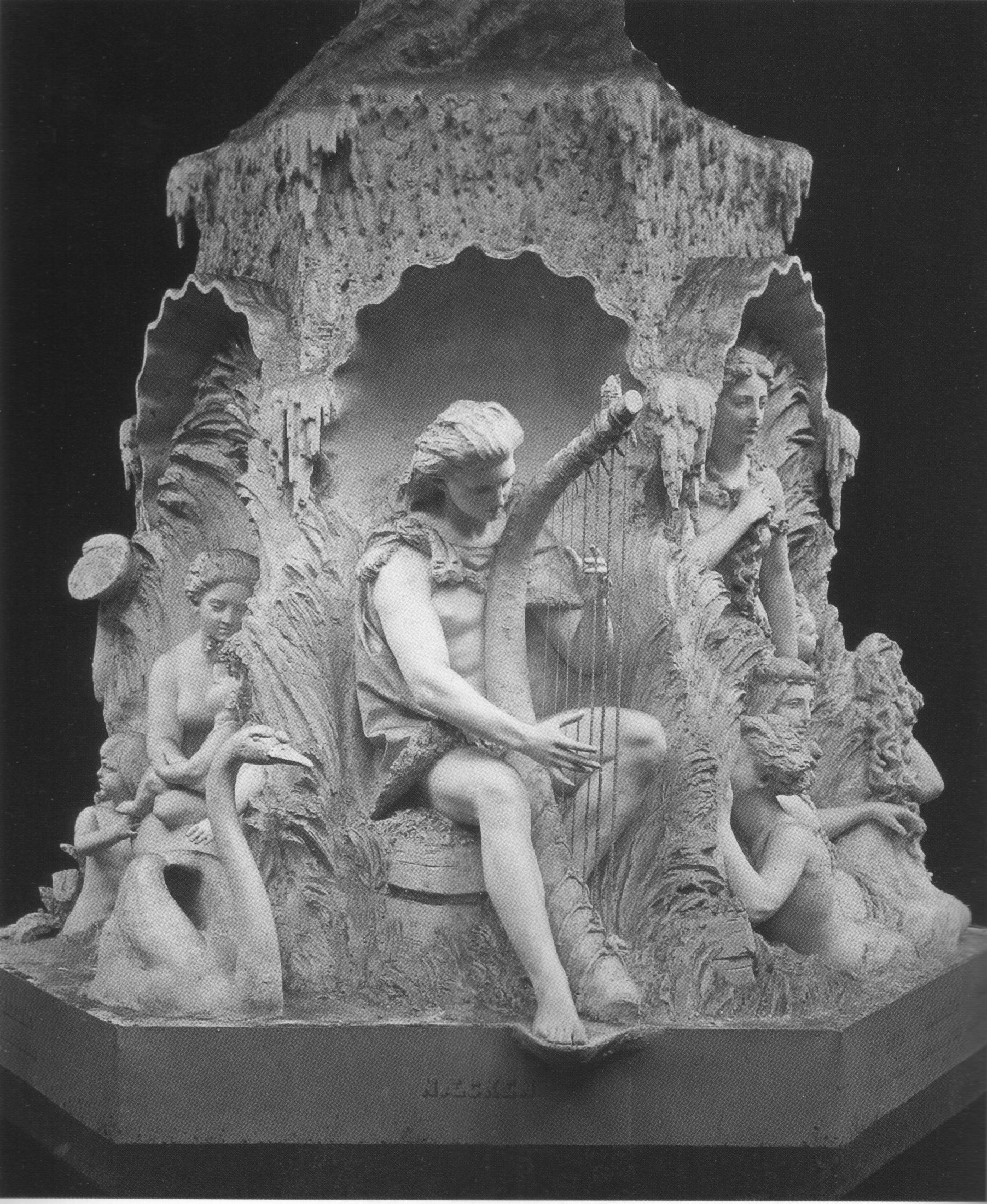
Molins fountain was placed centrally at the General Industrial Exposition of Stockholm (1866)

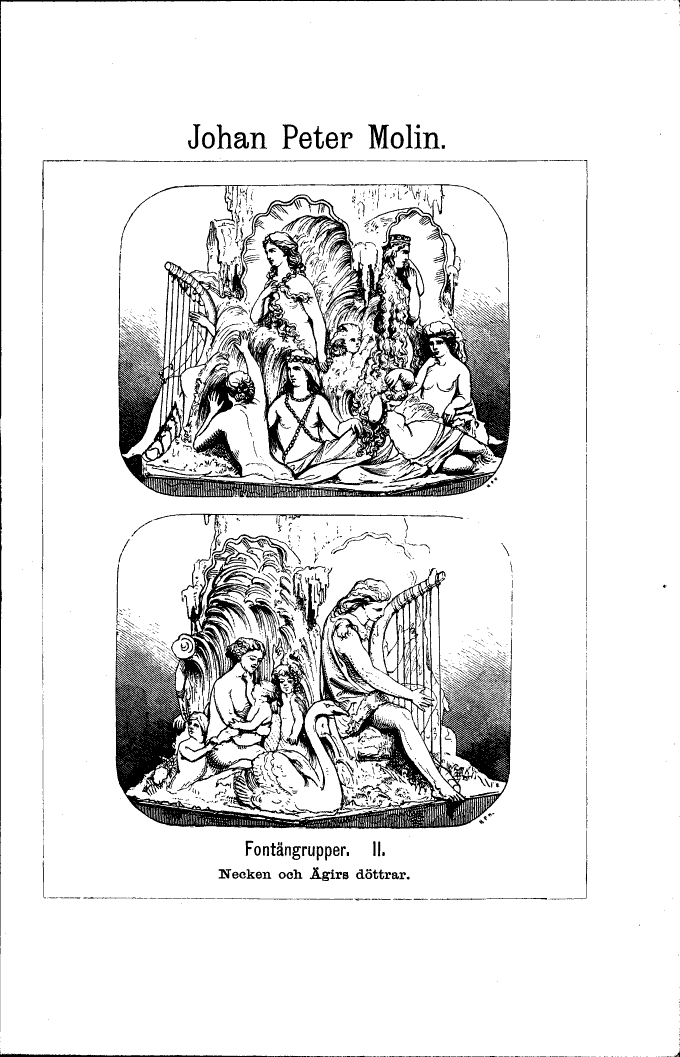
Fountain groups

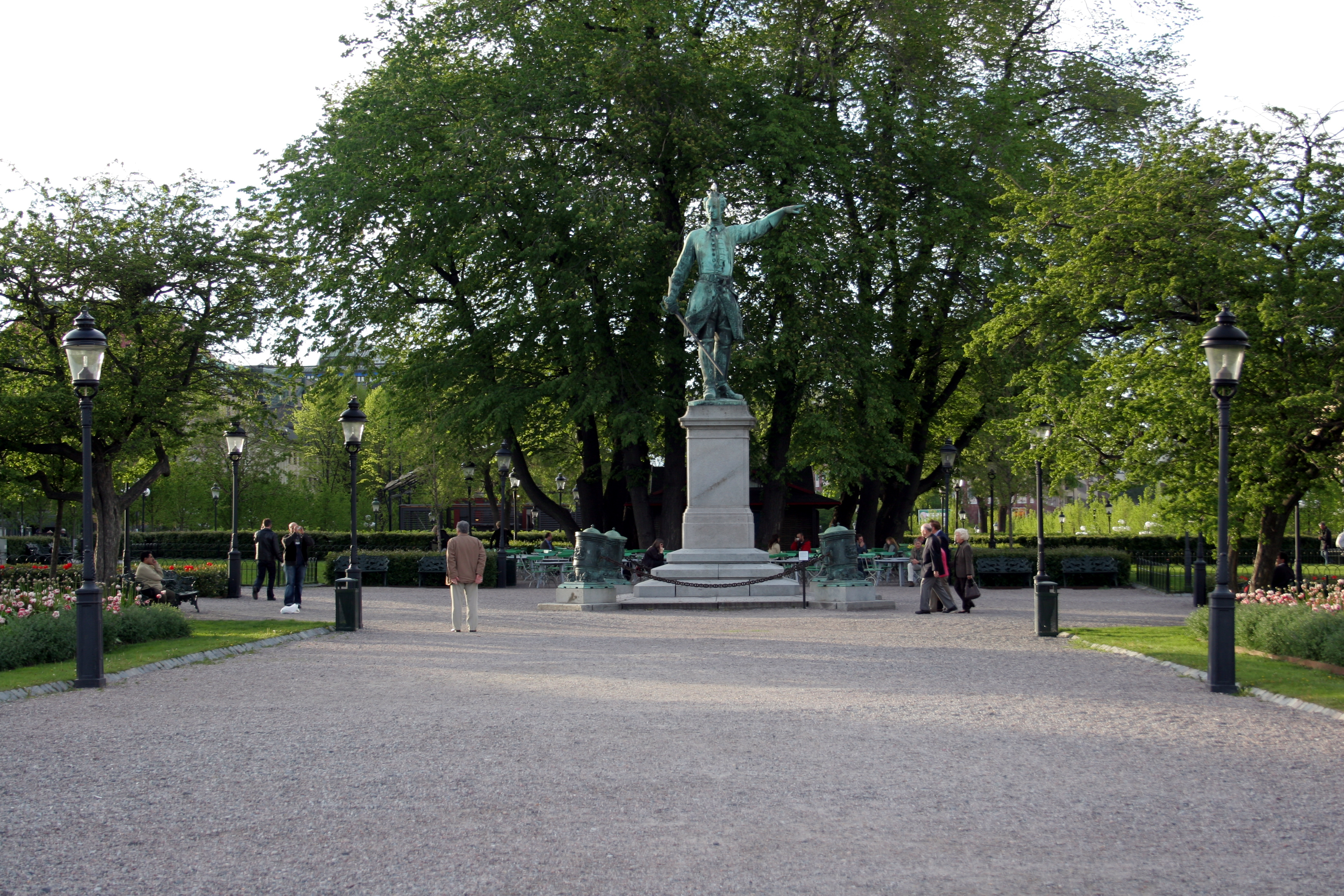
Statue of Karl XII

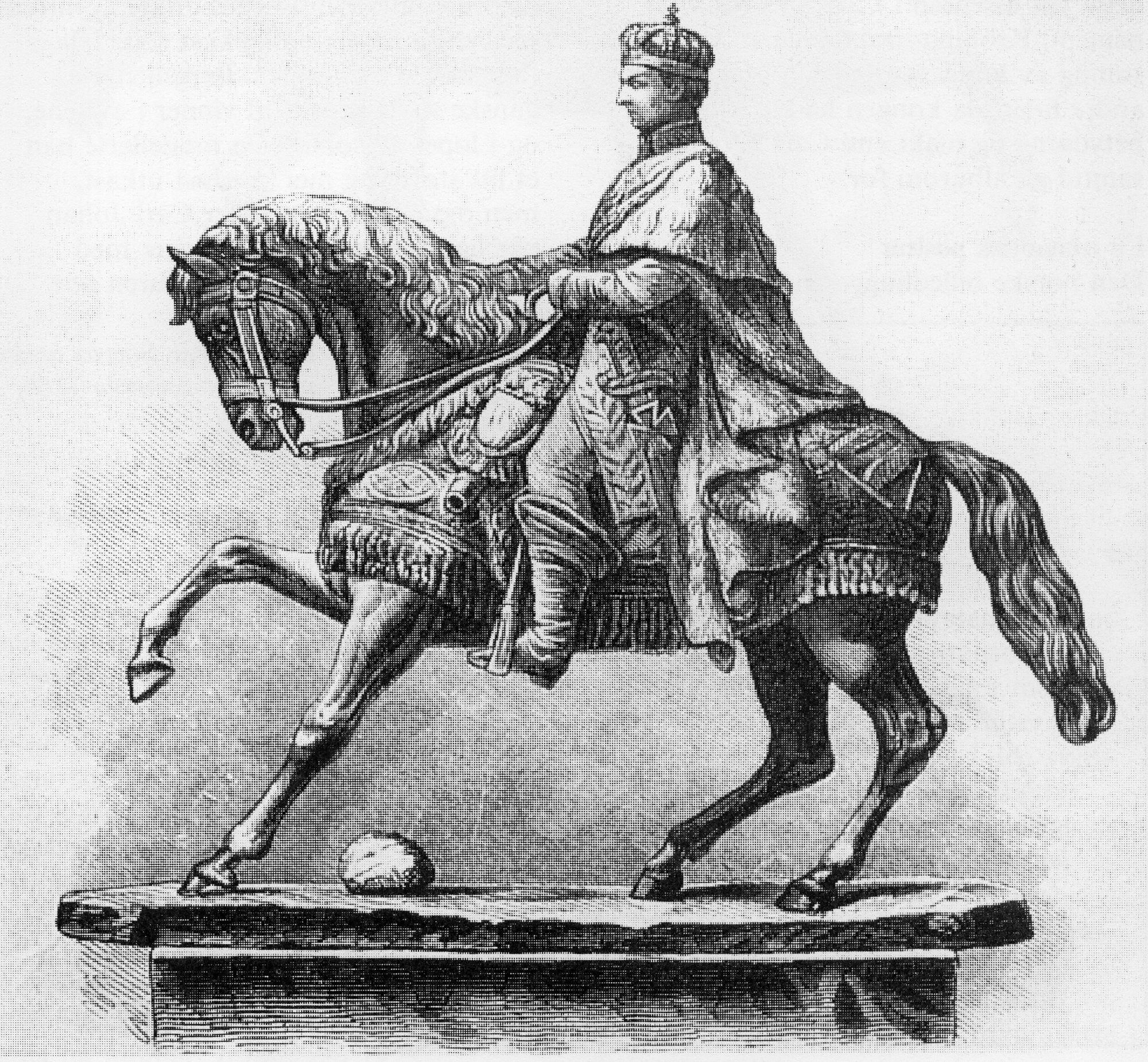
Sketch of the statue of Karl XIV Johan in Norway 1867
