= Susi (name) =

Susi is a given name and a surname. Notable people with the surname include:

=== Given name ===
- Susi Erdmann (born 1968), German luger and bobsledder
- Susi Ganeshan (born 1969), Indian film director
- Susi Giebisch (born 1930), Austrian figure skater
- Susi Graf (born 1959), Austrian-American film director
- Susi Handschmann (born 1959), Austrian ice dancer
- Susi Jeans (1911–1993), Austrian organist
- Susi Kentikian (Susianna Kentikian; born 1987), Armenian boxer
- Susi Kilgore, American illustrator
- Susi Lanner (1911–2006), Austrian film actress
- Susi Nicoletti (1918–2005), Austrian film actress
- Susi Pudjiastuti (born 1965), 6th Minister of Maritime Affairs and Fisheries of Indonesia, CEO Susi Air
- Susi Susanti (born 1971), Indonesian badminton player
- Susi Wirz (Suzanne Wirz; born 1931), Swiss figure skater
- Susi (biblical figure), scout mentioned in the Bible
- Susi, loyal servant of explorer David Livingstone, along with Chuma

=== Surname ===
- Arnold Susi (1896–1968), Estonian politician and lawyer
- Carol Ann Susi (1952–2014), American actress
- Dunia Susi (born 1987), English football player
- Heli Susi (1929–2020), Estonian teacher and translator
- Timo Susi (born 1959), Finnish ice hockey player

== See also ==
- al-Susi (disambiguation); also as-Susi
- Sushi (disambiguation)
- Susie (disambiguation)
- Susy (disambiguation)
- Suzi (disambiguation)
- Suzie (disambiguation)
- Suzy (disambiguation)
