= Susanna (given name) =

Suzanna
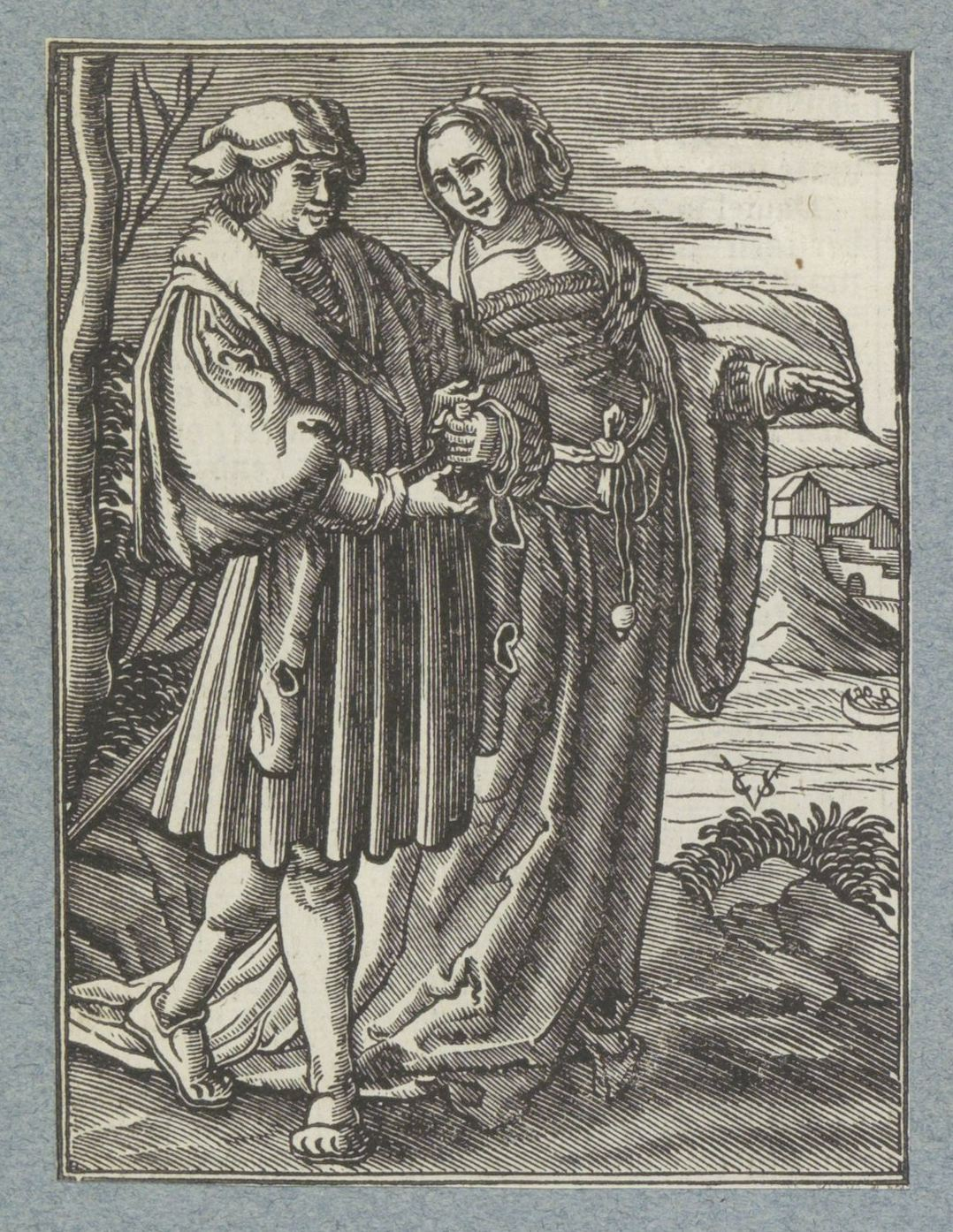
- 17th century print depicting Susanna and Jehoiakim
- Gender: Female

Origin
- Meaning: lily, anemone, true beauty

Other names
- Alternative spelling: Susannah, Suzannah, Susana, Suzana, Suzanna
- Related names: Susan, Suzanne, Zsuzsanna, Snežana

Susanna or Suzanna is a feminine first name. The name ultimately derives from the Egyptian word zššn (later zšn), meaning "lotus". The Egyptologist Alan Gardiner described the name's Egyptian origin as "beyond question". It is the name of women in the Biblical books of Daniel and Luke. It is also often spelled Susannah. The Persian form سوسن (Susan) and the Armenian Շուշան (Shushan) also mean iris. The Arabic form is سوسن (Sawsan), meaning "iris". The spelling Susanna is used in Sweden, Italy, the Netherlands and Finland, as well as in the English-speaking world. The spelling Zuzana is used in the Czech Republic and Slovakia, and Zsuzsanna in Hungary. In Poland it is Zuzanna, and in Russia Сюзанна (Syuzanna). In France it is Suzanne, and in Spain and Portugal it is spelled Susana. In Hebrew, the form is Shoshana.

“As chaste as Susanna” is an English saying in reference to the Biblical character.

== List of people with the given name Susanna ==
- Susanna (disciple), one of the women associated with the ministry of Jesus of Nazareth
- Susanna, a woman mentioned in Additions to Daniel
- Susanna of Rome, Christian martyr
- Susanna Agnelli, Italian politician, businesswoman, and writer
- Susanna Al-Hassan, Ghanaian author and politician
- Susanna Blamire, English Romantic poet
- Susannah Carr, Australian newsreader
- Susanna Ceccardi, Italian politician
- Susanna Cherchi (born 1955), Italian politician
- Susanna Clarke, British author
- Susanna Dinnage, British television businesswoman
- Susanna Dunachie, Scottish microbiologist and immunologist
- Susanna M. D. Fry, American educator, activist
- Susanna Gossweiler, Swiss educator
- Susanna Hall, William Shakespeare's first daughter
- Suzanna Hamilton, English actress
- Suzanna Hext, British para swimmer and equestrian
- Susanna Hoffs, American musician
- Susanna Hunt, English pop singer, actress and model
- Susanna Kahlefeld (born 1964), German politician
- Suzanna Leigh, British actress
- Susanna Leveson-Gower, Marchioness of Stafford, British noblewoman
- Susanna Lewis, American textile artist
- Susanna Maiolo (born 1984), Italo-Swiss attacker of Pope Benedict XVI
- Susanna Mälkki, Finnish cellist and conductor
- Susanna Minguell, Spanish philosopher and writer
- Susanna Moodie, Canadian writer
- Susanna Nerantzi, Greek pianist and composer
- Susanna Orelli-Rinderknecht, Swiss activist
- Susanna Louise Patteson (1853–1922), American stenographer, educator and author
- Suzanna Randall, German astrophysicist
- Susanna Reid, English television presenter
- Suzanna Sablairolles, Dutch actress
- Suzanna Shahbazian, Canadian rhythmic gymnast
- Susana Soca, Uruguayan poet
- Susanna Tamaro, Italian author
- Susanna Tapani (born 1992), Finnish ice hockey and ringette player
- Susanna Temple, English courtier
- Susanna Wallumrød (born 1979), Norwegian singer
- Susanna Wesley, mother of John Wesley and Charles Wesley
- Suzzanna Martha Frederika van Osch (known mononymously as Suzzanna), Indonesian actress
- Kim Susanna (stage name Bessie, born 2004), South Korean singer, rapper and member of girl group Lapillus

=== Fictional characters with the given name Susanna ===
- Focal character of "Oh! Susanna", a popular Gold Rush era song by Stephen Foster

=== Events ===
- Killing of Susanna Feldmann, a crime that occurred in Germany in 2018

== See also ==
- Susanna (disambiguation)
- Susan (given name)
- Susann
- Susanne (given name)
- Susana (given name)
- Susannah (given name)
- Suzanne (given name)
- Sanna (name)
- Susie (disambiguation)
- Susy (disambiguation)
- Suzy (disambiguation)
- Suzie (disambiguation)
- Suze (disambiguation)
- Shoshana
