= Susan =

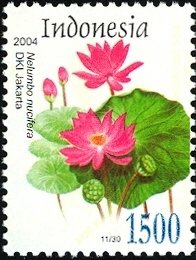
- Stamp of Indonesia with lotus flowers. The name Susan is derived from the Hebrew shoshan, meaning lotus flower in Egyptian.
- Pronunciation: Soo-zen
- Gender: Female

Origin
- Origin: Egyptian, Persian, Greek, and Hebrew
- Meaning: Lily, Pure, Lotus flower

Other names
- Related names: Sue, Suellen, Susie, Susannah, Suzanne, Zuzana, Zuzu
- Popularity: see popular names

Susan is a feminine given name, the usual English version of Susanna or Susannah. All are versions of the Hebrew name Shoshana, which is derived from the Hebrew shoshan, meaning lotus flower in Egyptian, original derivation, and several other languages.

== Variations ==
- Susana, Susanna (or Suzanna), Susannah, Suzana, Suzannah
- Susann, Sussan, Suzan, Suzann, Souzan
- Susanne, Suzanne
- Suzette
- Susie, Suzy

== Nicknames ==
Common nicknames for Susan include:

- Sue, Susie, Susi (German), Suzi, Suzy, Suzie, Suze, Sanna, Suzie, Sookie, Sukie, Sukey, Subo, Suus (Dutch), Shanti

== In other languages ==
- Albanian and Romanian: Suzana
- Amharic: ሶስና, romanized: Sosna
- Arabic: سوسن, romanized: Sawsan, or سوزان, Sūzān
- Armenian: Շուշան, romanized: Šušan
- Assyrian: ܫܘܫܢ, romanized: Shushan, or ܫܘܫܢܬ, Shushaneh
- Azerbaijani: Süsən
- Bengali: সুসান, romanized: Sausan, or সূজ়ন, Suzon
- Catalan, Estonian and Italian: Susanna
- Chinese: 苏珊, romanized: Sūshān
  - Yue Chinese: 蘇珊, romanized: Sou^{1}saan^{1}
- Czech and Slovak: Zuzana
- Danish and Norwegian: Susanne
- Dutch and Indonesian: Susan
- French: Suzanne
- German: Susanne, German: Susann or Susanna
  - Swiss Standard German: Susen
- Greek: Σουζάνα, romanized: Souzána, Σωσσάνα, Sōssána, or Σουσάννα, Sousánna
- Hebrew: שושנה, romanized: Shoshana; often shortened to שוש, Shosh, or שושי, Shoshi
- Hungarian: Zsuzsanna
- Japanese: スーザン, romanized: Sūzan
- Korean: 수잔, romanized: Sujan
- Kurdish: Sosna or Swesne
- Latvian: Zuzanna or Zane
- Malayalam: ശോഷണം, romanized: Shoshannam
- Māori: Huhana
- Persian: سوسن, romanized: Sousan or Susan
  - Tajik: Савсан, romanized: Savsan, or Сӯсан, Sūsan
- Polish: Zuzanna
- Portuguese: Susana or Açucena
- Serbian: Сузана, romanized: Suzana
- Spanish: Susana or Azucena
- Swedish: Susanna, Sanna or Susanne
- Russian: Сюзанна, romanized: Syuzanna
- Turkish: Suzan
- Ukrainian: Сусанна, romanized: Susanna
- Urdu: کنول, romanized: Kanul, lit. 'Lotus'
