= Siouxsie (name) =

Siouxsie is a female given name popularized by singer Siouxsie Sioux in September 1976 when she co-founded Siouxsie and the Banshees. Siouxsie Sioux's first name was Susan; she chose the word Sioux in honor of the Sioux tribe of Native Americans. The earliest known references to the name stem from 1919.

It is an alternative form of Susie and a diminutive form of Susan, Susanne, Suzanne, Susannah, Susanna or Susana.

Other notable people with the name Siouxsie include:

- Siouxsie Medley, American musician
- Siouxsie Q, American pornographic actress and activist
- Siouxsie Wiles, British microbiologist
