= Susanne =

Susanne may refer to:

- Susanne (given name), a feminine given name (including a list of people with the name)
- USS Susanne (SP-411), later USS SP-411, a United States Navy patrol boat in commission from 1917 to 1919
- USS Susanne (SP-832), the proposed name and designation for a vessel the Navy considered for service during World War I but never acquired
- Susanne (1950 film), a Danish film directed by Torben Anton Svendsen
- Susanne (1961 film), a Swedish film directed by Elsa Colfach
- "Susanne" (song), by Weezer

== See also ==
- Suzanne (disambiguation)
- Susanna (disambiguation)
- Susana (disambiguation)
- Susann
- Zuzana
