= Suzie =

Suzie or Susie is a feminine given name, and is a short form (hypocorism) of Suzanne, Susannah or Susan.

Notable people with this given name include:

== People ==
- Suzannah Suzie Bates (born 1987), New Zealand cricketer
- Suzie Brasher (born 1960 or 1961), American former figure skater, 1976 World Junior champion
- Suzie d'Auvergne (1942–2014), Saint Lucian barrister and jurist
- Suzie Dickinson (1955–2018), Australian singer
- Suzanne Suzie Faulkner (born 1979), Australian field hockey player
- Suzannah Suzie Fraser (born 1983), Australian water polo player
- Suzie Higgie, lead singer, guitarist and songwriter of the Australian alternative rock band Falling Joys
- Suzanne Suzie Kitson (born 1969), English former cricketer
- Suzie LeBlanc (born 1961), Canadian soprano and early music specialist
- Suzie McConnell-Serio (born 1966), American women's basketball coach and former player
- Susan Suzie McNeil (born 1976), Canadian singer and songwriter
- Suzie Pierrepont (born 1985), English professional squash player
- Susan Suzie Plakson (born 1958), American actress
- Suzanah Suzie Templeton (born 1967), English animator
- Suzie Toase, British actress
- Suzie Vinnick, Canadian roots and blues singer, songwriter and guitarist
- Suzie Wrenn, American public relations consultant
- Suzie Zuzek (1920-2011), American textile designer

== Fictional characters ==
- Suzie Costello, antagonist and one-time protagonist of the television series Torchwood
- Suzie Wong (disambiguation), several characters
- Suzie, Dustin Henderson's girlfriend in Stranger Things
- Suzie, a ferret character from the animated series Billy The Cowboy Hamster
- Suzie, a character from the animated series Zip Zip
- Susie, a character from the video game Deltarune

== See also ==
- Suzie River, a tributary of the Mégiscane River in Quebec, Canada
- Susie (disambiguation)
- Susy (disambiguation)
- Suzy (given name)
