= Shoshana =

Shoshana (Shoshánna(h), שׁוֹשַׁנָּה) is a Hebrew feminine first name. It is the name of at least two women in the Bible and, via Σουσάννα (Sousanna), it developed into such European and Christian names as Susanna, Susan, Susanne, Susana, Susannah, Suzanne, Susie, Suzie, Sanna and Zuzana. In Ethiopia (Ge'ez: ሶስና, ሦሥና) it became Sosie, Sosina, Sosena, while in North Africa it yielded Sawsen and Sawsan.

The original Hebrew form Shoshana, from which all these are derived, is still commonly used by Jews and in contemporary Israel, often shortened to Shosh or Shoshi. In Biblical times shoshaná referred to a lily (from Lilium family); in modern Hebrew it refers to a rose.

== People ==
Notable people with the name include:

- Soshana Afroyim (1927–2015), Austrian painter who adopted the name (with a variant spelling) during her stay in Israel
- Shoshana Arbeli-Almozlino (Hebrew: שושנה ארבלי-אלמוזלינו, 1926–2015), Israeli politician who served as Minister of Health between 1986 and 1988
- Shoshana Bean (born 1977), American stage actress and singer known for her roles in Broadway musicals during the 2000s
- Shoshana Bush (born 1988), American actress
- Shoshana Chatfield (born 1965), vice admiral, United States Navy
- Shoshana Damari (Hebrew: שושנה דמארי, 1923–2006), Yemenite-Israeli singer known as the queen of Hebrew music
- Shoshana Felman (born 1942), Woodruff Professor of Comparative Literature and French at Emory University
- Shoshanna Lonstein Gruss (born 1975), American fashion designer
- Shoshana Johnson (born 1973), Panamanian former United States soldier, the first black female U.S. prisoner of war
- Shoshana Kamin (Russian: Шошана Камин, Hebrew: שושנה קמין; born 1930) Soviet-born Israeli mathematician
- Shoshana Lew (born 1983), executive director of the Colorado Department of Transportation
- Shoshana Netanyahu (Hebrew: שׁוֹשַׁנָּה נְתַנְיָהוּ, 1923–2022), Israeli lawyer and judge, a former justice of the Supreme Court of Israel
- Shoshana Persitz (Hebrew: שושנה פרסיץ, 1892–1969), Zionist activist, educator and Israeli politician
- Shoshana Ribner (Hebrew: שושנה ריבנר, 1938–2007), Israeli Olympic swimmer
- Shoshana Riseman (born 1948), Israeli music educator, stage director and composer
- Shoshana Rudiakov (1948–2012), Latvian pianist
- Shoshanah Seumanutafa, Canadian rugby union player
- Shoshannah Stern (born 1980), American actress
- Shoshana Strook, the daughter of Israeli minister Orit Strook
- Shoshana Zuboff (born 1951), professor of Business Administration at the Harvard Business School

== Fictional characters ==
- Shoshanna Dreyfus, the French Jew who is the female protagonist of the 2009 movie Inglourious Basterds
- Shoshanna Shapiro, the youngest member of the group of friends in HBO's Girls
- Shoshanna, the name of Upskirt Kurt's seaplane in the Bob's Burgers episode "Seaplane!"
- Shoshanna, Snake's girlfriend in the Simpsons episode "Bart Sells His Soul"
- Shoshana, a cafe owner on Rechov Sumsum, as portrayed on Shalom Sesame by Shosha Goren
- Shoshana Schoenbaum, therapist and alter of Tara Gregson on United States of Tara
- Shoshanna, a character on the Nigerian soap opera Tinsel
- Shoshanna, the daughter of Waverly in The Joy Luck Club
- Shoshanna, the girlfriend of Klaus in American Dad!

== See also ==
- Susannah (given name)
- Vered, another name meaning "rose"
- Roza
