= Suki =

Suki may refer to:

== People ==
- Suki (Low Sook Yee) (born 1989), Malaysian singer, winner of the reality TV series One in a Million
- Suki Brownsdon (born 1965), British swimmer
- Suki Chan (born 1977), Hong Kong artist
- Suki Chui (born 1984), Hong Kong actress and Miss Hong Kong participant
- Suki Goodwin, actress who appeared in Hell Night
- Suki Kaiser, actress, married to actor Jonathan Scarfe
- Suki Seokyeong Kang (1977–2025), South Korean multimedia artist
- Suki Kim (born 1970), Korean American writer, author of The Interpreter
- Suki Kwan, Hong Kong actress who appeared in Drunken Master II and other films
- Suki Lahav (born 1951), Israeli violinist, vocalist, actress, lyricist, screenwriter, and novelist
- Suki Manabe (born 1931), Japanese meteorologist and climatologist
- Suki Potier (1946–1981), English model
- Suki Schorer (born 1939), American ballet dancer, ballet mistress, teacher, and writer
- Suki Sivam, Tamil scholar, novelist, and TV host
- Suki Sommer (Susan T. Sommer) (1935–2008), American music librarian, teacher, editor, and music critic
- Suki Waterhouse (born 1992), English model and actress
- Suki Webster, improv performer and co-writer of Paul Merton's Birth of Hollywood

=== Characters ===
- Suki (Avatar: The Last Airbender), the leader of the exclusively female Kyoshi Warriors, a sect established by the Avatar incarnation of the same name
- Suki Yaki, in the 1966 film What's Up, Tiger Lily?
- Suki Panesar, from the BBC soap opera EastEnders
- Sookie Stackhouse, in novels and the TV series True Blood
- Sookie St. James, in the TV series Gilmore Girls, played by Melissa McCarthy
- Suky Tawdry, in The Beggar's Opera and The Threepenny Opera
- The Groovy Girls doll line by Manhattan Toy features a doll named Suki
- Suki, an Alaskan malamute dog on the PBS children's program Molly of Denali
- Suki, in the 2003 American film 2 Fast 2 Furious
- Suki, a hedgehog in Pikwik Pack
- Sukie Ridgemont, character in John Updike's novel The Witches of Eastwick, played by Michelle Pfieffer in the 1987 film
- Suki A Character from the film Silent Hill: Revelation

== Places ==
- Suki, Miyazaki, a village in Nishimorokata District, Miyazaki, Japan
- Suki, Papua New Guinea, a city in Western Province, Papua New Guinea
  - Suki Airport, an airport in Suki, Papua New Guinea
- Suki Dam, an earthfill dam on Suki river near Khiroda, Maharashtra, India
- Suki-ye Olya, a village in Lorestan Province, Iran

== Other uses ==
- Suki language, a language of Papua New Guinea
- "Suki" (song), 1994 song by Dreams Come True
- "SUKI", 2024 song by Eric Reprid
- Suki: A Like Story, a 1999 manga by CLAMP
- Thai suki, a Thai a communal dish where diners dip food into a pot of broth

== See also ==
- Shuki (disambiguation)
- Tsuki, the Japanese word for "thrust", used in martial arts
- AnimeSuki, a website that focuses on providing unlicensed anime fansubs
- Sukiyaki (disambiguation)
- Sukie (disambiguation)
- Sookie
