= Suzanne (given name) =

Suzanne is a common female given name that was particularly popular in the United States in the 1950s and 1960s. It remained in the top 200 most popular names in the United States between 1930 and the late 1980s. Form of the Hebrew name שׁוֹשַׁנָּה (Shoshannah). This was derived from the Hebrew word שׁוֹשָׁן (shoshan) meaning "lily" (in modern Hebrew this also means "rose"). However, it has also been regularly used in English speaking countries since before the start of the 20th century. It may also be spelled Susanne, and common diminutives are Sue and Suzy.

== People with the given name ==
- Suzanne, Duchess of Bourbon, (1491–1521)
- Suzanne Bachelard (1919–2007), French philosopher
- Suzanne Beauclerk, Duchess of St Albans (1921–2010), English writer and painter
- Suzanne Bertillon (1891–1980), French decorator, journalist, lecturer, and resistance fighter
- Suzanne Bianchetti (1889–1936), French film actress
- Suzanne Bischoff van Heemskerck (born 1950), Dutch politician
- Suzanne Blackwell, New Zealand psychologist
- Suzanne Bombardier (1966–1980), American murder victim
- Suzy Bofia (born 1984), Cameroonian basketball player
- Suzanne Bonamici (born 1954), American politician
- Suzanne Camelia-Römer (born 1959), Curaçao politician, twice Prime Minister of the Netherlands Antilles
- Suzanne Capper (d. 1992), 16-year-old girl from Manchester who was murdered after being tortured and set on fire.
- Suzanne Christy (1904–1974), Belgian film actress
- Suzanne Clément (born 1969), Canadian actress
- Suzanne Cloutier (1923–2003), Canadian actress
- Suzanne Collins (born 1962), American television writer and author
- Suzanne Crémieux (1895–1976), French politician
- Suzanne Crocker, Canadian documentary filmmaker
- Suzanne Cryer (born 1967), American actress
- Suzanne Curchod (1737–1794), French-Swiss salonist and write
- Suzanne D'Mello, Indian singer, songwriter, vocal arranger, lyricist
- Suzanne Danco (1911–2000), Belgian soprano
- Suzanne Débarbat (1928–2024), French astronomer and historian of science
- Suzanne Desan (born 1957), American professor of history
- Suzanne Dechevaux-Dumesnil (1900–1989), French wife of Samuel Beckett
- Suzanne Degnan (died 1946), American murder victim
- Suzanne Diskeuve (born 1920s), Belgian figure skater
- Suzanne Doucet (born 1944), German singer, composer and producer
- Suzanne Farrell (born 1945), American ballerina
- Suzanne Flon (1918–2005), French film actress and comedian
- Suzanne Freriks (born 1984), Dutch volleyball player
- Suzanne de Goede (born 1984), Dutch racing cyclist
- Suzanne Goldberg (1940–1999), New Zealand artist
- Marie-Suzanne Giroust (1734–1772), French painter
- Suzanne Grant (born 1984), Scottish footballer
- Suzanne Harmes (born 1986), Dutch gymnast
- Suzanne Harvey, American politician
- Suzanne Hiltermann-Souloumiac (1919–2001), French Resistance member
- Suzanne Innes-Stubb (born 1970), British-Finnish attorney, First Lady of Finland 2024–
- Suzanne Johnston (born 1958), Australian operatic mezzo-soprano
- Suzanne Jovin (1977–1998), German-born American University senior
- Suzanne Ndunge Kiamba, Kenyan politician
- Suzanne Kosmas (born 1944), American politician
- Suzanne Lacascade (1884–1966), Martiniquais writer
- Suzanne Lambert, American comedian and internet personality
- Suzanne Landau (born 1946), Israeli art museum curator
- Suzanne Lapointe (1934–2015), Canadian singer
- Suzanne Lappin (born 1986), Scottish footballer
- Suzanne Leclercq (1901–1994), Belgian paleobotanist and paleontologist
- Suzanne Leclézio (1898–1987), French resistance fighter, nurse, railway social worker
- Suzanne Le Mignot (born 1970), American television news reporter
- Suzanne Lenglen (1899–1938), French tennis player who won 31 Championship titles
- Suzanne Lilar (1901–1992), Flemish Belgian essayist, novelist, and playwright
- Suzanne Luther, American politician
- Suzanne Luttikhuis (born 1977), Dutch volleyball player
- Suzanne Malveaux (born 1966), American television news reporter
- Suzanne Manet (1829–1906), Dutch-born pianist, wife of Édouard Manet
- Suzanne Morrow (1930–2006), Canadian figure skater
- Suzanne Mubarak (born 1941), First Lady of Egypt from 1981 to 2011
- Suzanne Mulvey (née Malone, born 1984), Scottish footballer
- Suzanne Noël (1878–1954), French plastic surgeon, first female plastic surgeon in the world
- Suzanne Perlman (1922–2020), Hungarian-Dutch visual artist
- Suzanne Pleshette (1937–2008), American actress
- Suzanne Plesman (born 1971), Dutch field hockey player
- Suzanne Reichenberg (1853–1924), French actress
- Susanne Ringell (born 1955), Finnish writer and actress
- Suzanne Rogers (born 1943), former Rockette and now Days of Our Lives star
- Suzanne Rohr (born 1939), Swiss watch enameller
- Suzanne Rutland (born 1946), Australian historian
- Suzanne Silvercruys (1898–1973), Belgian-born American sculptor and political activist
- Suzanne Somers (1946–2023), American actress, author, singer and businesswoman
- Suzanne Spaak (1901–1944), Belgian World War II French Resistance operative
- Mercury Suzanne Stardust (born 1987), American TikToker, transgender rights activist, and home repair educator
- Suzanne Tassier (1898–1956), Belgian historian
- Suzanne Valadon (1865–1938), French painter
- Suzanne van Veen (born 1987), Dutch racing cyclist
- Suzanne Vega (born 1959), American singer and songwriter
- Suzanne Veil (1886–1956), French chemist
- Suzanne Elise Walsh, American academic administrator
- Suzanne Wikle, American politician

== See also ==
- Suzanne (disambiguation)
- Suzann
- Susan (given name)
- Susann
- Susanne (given name)
- Susana (given name)
- Susanna (given name)
- Susannah (given name)
- Sanna (name)
- Susie (disambiguation)
- Susy (disambiguation)
- Suzi (disambiguation)
- Suzie (disambiguation)
- Suze (disambiguation)
- Suzy (disambiguation)
- Shoshana
