= Sousan =

Sousan or Soosan (Persian: سوسن) is the Persian equivalent of the English given name Susan. Notable people with the name include:

- Han Soosan (born 1946), South Korean author
- Sousan (singer) (1943–2004), Iranian singer
- Sousan S. Altaie, American drug researcher
- Sousan Azadi (born 1954), Iranian author and designer
- Soosan Firooz (born 1989), Afghan actress and rapper
- Sousan Hajipour (born 1990), Iranian taekwondo practitioner
- Sousan Keshavarz (born 1965), Iranian politician
- Soosan Lolavar, British-Iranian composer and educator
- Sousan Massi (born 1989), Swedish tennis player
- Sousan Taslimi (born 1950), Iranian-Swedish actress

== See also ==
- Sawsan
- Souzan
- Sussan (given name)
