= USS Susanne =

USS Susanne has been the name of more than one United States Navy ship, and may refer to:

- USS Susanne (SP-411), a patrol vessel in commission from 1917 to 1919
- USS Susanne (SP-832), the proposed name and designation for a vessel the Navy considered for service during World War I but never acquired

== See also ==
- USS Suzanne (SP-510)
