= Susi =

Susi may refer to:

- Susi (name), given name and surname
- 933 Susi, a minor planet orbiting the Sun
- Susi Air, an Indonesian airline
- SUSI, Sydney University Stellar Interferometer, an optical interferometer in Sydney, Australia

== See also ==
- al-Susi (disambiguation); also as-Susi
- Sushi (disambiguation)
- Susie (disambiguation)
- Susy (disambiguation)
- Suzi (disambiguation)
- Suzie (disambiguation)
- Suzy (disambiguation)
