= Sussi =

Sussi may refer to:

- Sussi (cloth), a type of cloth from South Asia
- Andrea Sussi (born 1973), Italian football player and coach
- Christian Sussi (born 2001), Italian football player
- Sussi, a female given name, diminutive of Susanne
- Sussi (film), a film directed by Gonzalo Justiniano

== See also ==
- Susi (disambiguation)
- Sussie (disambiguation)
- Sussy (disambiguation)
