= Suzy (given name) =

Suzy is a feminine given name, usually a short form (hypocorism) of Suzanne, Susan, etc. People named Suzy include:

== People ==
- Suzy Aitchison (born 1960), English television actress
- Suzy Batkovic (born 1980), Australian basketball player
- Suzy Becker (born 1962), American author, illustrator, entrepreneur, educator, and social activist
- Susan Suzy Bogguss (born 1956), American country music singer and songwriter
- Suzy Bloom, film/stage actress
- Suzy Bofia (born 1984), Cameroonian collegiate basketball player
- Suzy Byrne, Irish LGBT+ and disability rights activist, broadcaster, and writer
- Susan Suzy Amis Cameron (born 1962), American environmental advocate and former actress and model
- Suzy Carrier (1922–1999), French film actress
- Suzy Castor (born 1936), Haitian historian, educator, and human rights activist
- Suzanne Suzy Cato (born 1968), Australian-born New Zealand children's entertainer on television
- Suzy McKee Charnas (1939–2023), Hugo Award-winning American science fiction and fantasy writer
- Suzanne Suzy Chaffee (born 1946), American former Olympic alpine ski racer and actress
- Suzy Clarkson, author and former New Zealand television personality
- Suzy Davies, Welsh Conservative Party politician
- Suzy Delair (1917–2020), French actress and singer
- Suzy Kellems Dominik, American artist, publisher, arts and culture correspondent, socialite, and arts patron
- Suzy Frelinghuysen (1911–1988), also known as Suzy Morris, American abstract painter and opera singer
- Suzy Gorman (born 1962), American photographer based in St. Louis
- Suzy Favor Hamilton (born 1968), American former middle-distance runner
- Suzy Hotrod (born 1980), roller derby skater
- Suzy Jones (born 1948), American former competition swimmer
- Suzy Kendall (born 1944), British actress born Freda Harrison
- Suzanne Suzy Klein (born 1975), British writer and BBC radio and TV presenter
- Suzanne Suzy Kolber (born 1964), American reporter, producer and sportscaster
- Suzy Kline (born 1943), author
- Suzy Lamplugh disappeared from London in 1986
- Suzy Lake (born 1947), American-Canadian artist
- Suzy Lawlor (born 1984), Irish actress
- Suzy Lee (born 1974), children's book illustrator and author
- Suzy Lishman (born 1967/8), President of the British Royal College of Pathologists
- Suzy Menkes (born 1943), British journalist and fashion critic
- Suzy Merchant (born 1969), American basketball coach
- Suzy Miller, British model, actress, dancer, and choreographer
- Suzy Nakamura, (born 1968), American actress, and improv comedian
- Suzy Patterson (born 1961), actress
- Cecilia Suzy Parker (1932–2003), American model and actress
- Suzy Petty (born 1992), English field hockey player
- Suzy Pierson (1902–1996), French film actress
- Suzy Prim (1896–1991), French actress
- Suzy Shepherd (née Robertson, born 1975), Scottish football player and coach
- Suzy Shortland (born 1974), former New Zealand female rugby union representative
- Suzy Shuster (born 1971 or 1972), American sportscaster
- Suzy Solidor (1900–1983), French singer and actress born Suzanne Marion
- Suzy Spafford (born 1945), American cartoonist
- Suzy Spencer (born 1954), American author and journalist
- Suzy Varty, noted British comics artist, writer, and editor
- Suzy Welch (born 1959), American author, television commentator, business journalist and public speaker, wife of business executive Jack Welch
- Suzy Whaley (born c. 1967), American professional golfer, first woman to qualify for and win a PGA tournament

== Characters ==
- Suzy Bishop, a fictional character from Wes Anderson's film Moonrise Kingdom
- Suzy Branning, a fictional character from the BBC One soap opera EastEnders
- Suzy Homemaker, a line of miniature functional toy household appliances
- "Suzy Snowflake", a song and titular character
- Suzy Sheep, a character from Peppa Pig
- Suzy Johnson, a fictional character from the Disney animated series Phineas and Ferb

== See also ==
- Suzie
- Suzy (disambiguation)
