= Ji-soo =

- Hangul: 지수
- RR: Jisu
- MR: Chisu

Ji-soo, also spelled Ji-su, Jee-su, or Jee-soo, is a Korean given name.

== Entertainers ==
- Kim Ji-soo (disambiguation), multiple people
- Lia (South Korean singer) (born Choi Ji-su, 2000), South Korean singer
- Ji Soo (born Kim Ji-soo, 1993), South Korean actor
- Jihyo (born Park Ji-soo, 1997), South Korean singer, leader of girl group Twice
- Jisoo (born Kim Ji-soo, 1995), South Korean singer and actress, member of girl group Blackpink
- Joshua (American singer) (born Joshua Jisoo Hong, 1995), American singer, member of boy group Seventeen
- Park Ji-soo (disambiguation), multiple people
- Seo Ji-soo (born 1994), South Korean singer, member of girl group Lovelyz
- Shin Ji-soo (born 1985), South Korean actress

== Sportspeople ==
- Hwang Ji-soo (born 1981), South Korean football player
- Jeon Ji-soo (born 1985), South Korean short track speed skater
- Jisoo Han (born 1983), South Korean diving instructor
- Jisu Park (born 1990), South Korean professional StarCraft player
- Jung Ji-soo (born 1990), South Korean football player
- Kim Ji-soo (baseball) (born 1986), South Korean baseball player
- Kim Ji-soo (skeleton racer) (born 1994), South Korean skeleton racer
- Mo Ji-soo (born 1969), South Korean short track speed skater
- Park Ji-soo (footballer) (born 1994), South Korean football player
- Park Ji-su (born 1998), South Korean basketball player
- Seo Ji-soo (born 1985), South Korean professional StarCraft player
- Yoon Ji-su (born 1993), South Korean fencer

== Fictional characters ==
- Ha Ji-soo, a character from the Korean manhwa Unbalance ×2
- Jisoo, a guest character from the Thai television series Girl2K
- Yoon Ji-soo, a character from the Korean television series Sweet Home
- Yun Jisoo, a character from the Korean novel If You Leave Me

== See also ==
- List of Korean given names
