= Sookie =

Sookie, also written ‘Sukey’ or ‘Suki’, is a variant of the name Susan or Susannah, from Hebrew שׁוֹשַׁנָּה (Shoshána) meaning "rose" or "lily."

Most famously, the name occurs in the English nursery rhyme "Polly Put the Kettle On."

Notable people with the name include:

- Suki Brownsdon British swimmer
- Suki Lahav Israeli musician and writer
- Suki Potier English model
- Sukey Richardson Escaped slave and church co-founder
- Suki Schorer, American ballerina and ballet master
- Sukie Smith British actress and musician
- Suki Sommer American music librarian and critic
- Suki Waterhouse, English actress, model and singer-songwriter

== Fictional characters ==
- Sookie St. James, from the TV series Gilmore Girls
- Sookie Stackhouse, appearing in The Southern Vampire Mysteries novels and the True Blood TV adaptation
- Sookie Sapperstein, from the film Igby Goes Down
- The song Sookie Sookie by Steppenwolf on their eponymous album
- Sukey Tawdry in the Bertolt Brecht musical The Threepenny Opera and the song from it Mack the Knife
- Suke Damson in The Woodlanders By Thomas Hardy.

== See also ==
- Suki (disambiguation)
- Sukie (disambiguation)
