= Suzie Wong =

Suzie Wong can refer to:

- The World of Suzie Wong, a 1957 novel by Richard Mason
  - The World of Suzie Wong (play), the 1958 play adaptation of the novel
  - The World of Suzie Wong (film), the 1960 film adaptation of the novel
- Suzie Wong (Digimon), also known as Shuichon Li or Li Xiaochun, a character in Digimon Tamers
- "Suzie Wong", a song by Jacob Miller
- Suzie Wong (TV host) (born 1955), a Hong Kong TV host adopting this pseudonym
- Suzie Wong (orca), a killer whale at Ocean Park Hong Kong between 1979 and 1997

== See also ==
- Wong (disambiguation)
- Suzie (disambiguation)
- Suzi (disambiguation)
- Suzy (disambiguation)
