= Sooji =

Sooji may be:

- The South Asian name for semolina
- Okita Sooji (1842 or 1844 – 1868), member of the Shinsengumi (special police force) in Kyoto, Japan
- Alternative spelling of Su-ji, Korean given name

== See also ==
- Atta flour
- Ji-su
- Suji (disambiguation)
- Soo (disambiguation)
- Ji (disambiguation)
