= Shoshana (disambiguation) =

Shoshana is a Hebrew feminine given name.

Shoshana may also refer to:

- Shoshana (film), the 2023 British film
- Shoshana Foundation, non-profit organization
- Operation Shoshana, 1953 anti-Arab Israel Defense Forces operation
