= Jisu =

Jisu or ji-su, or variation, may refer to:

- Ji-su, Jisu, Ji Su, Ji-Su, Jee-Soo, Ji-Soo, Jee-Su (Korean: 지수) a Korean given name
- Jesus (name), spelled in Fijian and in Garo as "Jisu"
- Jisu (Chinese: 雞蘇) former name (10th century) for Tianjin
- Jisu (Japanese: ジース) a fictional character in Dragonball, see List of Dragon Ball characters

== See also ==
- Suji (disambiguation), including Su-Ji values
- Su (disambiguation)
- Ji (disambiguation)
