= Zet =

Zet or ZET may refer to:

- Zagreb Electric Tram, public transport operator in Zagreb, Croatia
- Radio Zet, Polish radio station
- Association of the Polish Youth "Zet", pre-1914 Polish organisation
- Z (letter), called "zet" by some people
- Z (military symbol), Russian militarist symbol referred to as zet (Cyrillic: зет) in Russian.
- Zet, the creator of Norwegian music project Ram-Zet
- NK ZET, Croatian football club
- Operation Zet, Russian support for China as part of the Sino-Soviet Non-Aggression Pact
- Djet, Egyptian pharaoh
- Zet, a hypocorism of the given name Suzette
