= Park Ji-soo =

- Hangul: 박지수
- RR: Bak Jisu
- MR: Pak Chisu

Park Ji-soo is a Korean name consisting of the family name Park and the given name Ji-soo (Ji-su). It may refer to:

- Park Ji-soo (footballer) (born 1994)
- Park Ji-soo (actress) (born 1988)
- Park Ji-su (born 1998), member of the South Korea women's national basketball team
- Jisu Park (born 1990), StarCraft player
- Jihyo (born Park Ji-soo, 1997), singer
