= Zsuzsanna =

- Pronunciation: [ˈʒuʒɒnɒ]
- Gender: Female
- Language: Hungarian

Origin
- Meaning: see Susanna
- Region of origin: Hungary

Other names
- Nicknames: Zsuzsa, Zsuzsi, Zsuzsika (endearing)
- Related names: Susanna, Susan, Suzanne

Zsuzsanna is the Hungarian form of the feminine given name Susanna.

== Notable bearers ==
- Zsuzsanna Budapest (born 1940), American author of Hungarian origin who writes on feminist spirituality
- Zsuzsanna Csobánki (born 1983), female Hungarian swimmer, who competed for her native country at the 2004 Summer Olympics in Athens, Greece
- Zsuzsanna Gulácsi (born 1966), Hungarian historian specialising in Manichaean art
- Zsuzsanna Jakab (born 1951), director of the World Health Organization's Regional Office for Europe in Copenhagen, Denmark
- Zsuzsanna Jakabos (born 1989), Hungarian swimmer, who twice competed for her native country at the Summer Olympics: 2004 and 2008
- Zsuzsanna Kézi (1945–2021), former Hungarian handball player who competed in the 1976 Summer Olympics
- Zsuzsanna Krajnyák (born 1978), Hungarian Paralympic wheelchair fencer
- Zsuzsanna Laky (born 1984), former beauty contestant and Miss Europe 2003
- Zsuzsanna Lorántffy (1602–1660), the wife of György Rákóczi I, prince of Transylvania
- Zsuzsanna Lovász-Pavlik (born 1976), Hungarian handball player
- Zsuzsanna Nagy (born 1986), Hungarian ice dancer
- Zsuzsanna Pálffy (born 1970), Hungarian handball player
- Zsuzsanna Sirokay (born 1941), Hungarian pianist and lives in Switzerland
- Zsuzsanna Szőcs (born 1962), Hungarian fencer, who won two Olympic medals in the foil team competitions
- Zsuzsanna Szabó-Olgyai (born 1973), retired pole vaulter from Hungary, who represented her native country at the 2000 Summer Olympics in Sydney
- Zsuzsanna Veress (born 1976), Hungarian handball goalkeeper
- Zsuzsanna Vörös (born 1977), Hungarian modern pentathlete who won a gold medal at the 2004 Summer Olympics in Athens, Greece
- ZZ Ward, (born 1986), born Zsuzsanna Eva Ward, American singer-songwriter
