= Sussan (given name) =

Sussan is an alternative spelling of the English given name Susan and its Persian equivalent Sousan. It also occurs as a surname. Notable people with the name include:

- Rene Ben Sussan (1895–1960s?), Greek illustrator
- Sussan (Iranian singer) (1943–2004), Iranian singer
- Sussan Babaie (born 1954), Iranian-born art historian and curator
- Sussan Deyhim (born 1958), Iranian-American musical artist and activist
- Sussan Ley (born 1961), Australian politician
- Sussan Nourshargh, British immunologist and pharmacologist
- Sussan Siavoshi, Iranian-American political scientist
- Sussan Tahmasebi, Iranian women's rights activist
- Sussan Taslimi (born 1950), Iranian-Swedish actress
- Sussan Taunton (born 1970), Mexican actress

== See also ==
- Susann
