= Suze =

Suze may refer to:

- Suze (river), a tributary of the Aar river in Switzerland
- Suze, Drôme, a commune of France in the Drôme department
- Suze (drink), a French brand of bitters
- "Suze (The Cough Song)", a 1963 recording by Bob Dylan
- Suze (film), a 2023 Canadian comedy-drama film by Dane Clark and Linsey Stewart

== People with the given name ==
- Suze DeMarchi (born 1964), Australian singer/songwriter
- Suze Groeneweg (1875–1940), Dutch politician
- Suze Orman (born 1951), American financial advisor, author, motivational speaker, and television host
- Suze Randall (born 1946), English photographer and model
- Suze Rotolo (1943–2011), American artist

== See also ==
- Suzie (disambiguation)
- Suzy (disambiguation)
- Suzanne (disambiguation)
- Susanna (disambiguation)
- Susan
