= Public Narrative =

Public Narrative – founded in 1989 as the Community Media Workshop – is a nonprofit organization based in Chicago that connects neglected communities with the media to promote better news coverage.

The stated aim is to be a catalyst for change in an informed society.

"We believe that a free and informed press, as well as an educated public, are the cornerstones of democracy," according to the organization's website at publicnarrative.org

Among Public Narrative's programs:

- Regular classes and workshops for both community groups and journalists, along with regular cable and radio shows.
- "Making Media Connections", a yearly workshop featuring thousands of journalists and nonprofit communicators.
- "Getting on the Air and Into Print", a regional media directory of more than 600 outlets and 3,500 journalists.
- The Ethnic & Community Media Project, supporting nearly 200 ethnic and media outlets in the Chicago area.
- The Studs Terkel Media Awards, recognizing outstanding journalists who dig deeply into community issues. Terkel participated in the award until his death, and the awards continue in his name.

From 2014 until August 2019, Public Narrative's president was Susy Schultz, a journalist, educator, and social advocate. She was succeeded by Jhmira Alexander, who was co-president with Schultz for the preceding eight months.

"Our work has always been to give voice to the voiceless in the city's neighborhood," she said, "and to help ensure those in the media and those in power listen."

Public Narrative has its headquarters at Columbia College Chicago.

== History ==
Founded in 1989 as Community Media Workshop, the Workshop believed that thoughtful news with diverse sources is a catalyst for change and the key to successful democracy and healthy communities. The name of the organization was changed in 2015.
