= Suchi =

Suchi may refer to:

- Suchi, "needle" in Sanskrit. It is also a name of vyuha battle formation in the Hindu epic Mahabharata
- Suchi (politician), Indian politician
- Suchitra, Indian singer and actress, also known as Suchi
- Suchi, Raebareli, a village in Uttar Pradesh, India

== See also ==
- Sushi (disambiguation)
- Suchitra (disambiguation)
