= Shuki =

Shuki may refer to:

- Shuki Levy (born 1947), Israeli-American composer
- Shuki Nagar (born 1977), Israeli former footballer
- Darm Shuki, a village in Iran
