= Suellen =

Suellen or SuEllen, also adapted to Suelen in other languages, is an English female given name, a compound of Sue and Ellen. Notable people with the name include:

- Glaucia Suelen Silva Cristiano (born 1993), Brazilian footballer
- Maria Suelen Altheman (born 1988), Brazilian judoka
- Nathália Suellen (born 1989), Brazilian digital artist and commercial illustrator
- Suellen Carey (born 1987), Brazilian transgender influencer, content creator and media personality
- Suellen Escribano, Filipina student activist
- Suellen Evans (1944–1965), American college student and murder victim
- SuEllen Fried (1932–2024), American bullying prevention activist, writer and educator
- Suellen Cristine Delangelica Lima (born 1989), Brazilian teacher and sitting volleyball player
- Suelen Pinto (born 1987), Brazilian volleyball player
- Suellen Reed (born 1945), American educational politician
- Suellen Rocca (1943–2020), American artist
- Tainá Suelen Borges de Oliveira (born 1995), Brazilian footballer

== Fictional characters ==
- Suellen O'Hara, sister of Scarlett in Gone with the Wind
- Sue Ellen Shepard Ewing in Dallas

== See also ==
- Suella
- Suelle
- Suellyn
