= Huhana =

Huhana (or Hūhana) is a Māori feminine given name, equivalent to the English name Susan. Notable people with the name include:

- Huhana Hickey, New Zealand Māori lawyer and disability advocate
- Hūhana Lyndon, New Zealand Māori entrepreneur and politician
- Huhana Smith (born 1962), New Zealand Māori artist and academic
- Huhana Susana Tetane Lemisio (born 1945), Tokelauan community organiser and educator
