= Sus =

Sus or SUS may refer to:

== Language, media, and arts ==
- Susu, a language spoken in Guinea and Sierra Leone
- Sus (meme), an Internet meme and shortened form of "suspicious", spoofing the video game Among Us
- Süs (magazine), a former Turkish magazine
- Sus (film), a 2010 British film
- Suspended chord, in music

== Places ==
- Sus, Lachin, a village
- Sus, Pune, India, a neighborhood
- Sus, Pyrénées-Atlantiques, France, a commune
- Susch, Graubünden, Switzerland, a municipality formerly called Süs
- Shush, Iran, the capital of Shush County in Khuzestan province, Iran
  - Susa - an ancient city at the site of modern Shush, notable for its historical importance, including being the winter capital of the Achaemenid Empire

== People ==
- Pierre de Sus, bailli of the Principality of Achaea
- Stepan Sus (born 1981), Ukrainian Greek Catholic bishop

=== Athletes ===
- Frank Süs, German footballer
- Martin Sus (footballer, born 1989), Czech footballer
- Martin Sus (footballer, born 1990), Czech footballer

=== Musicians ===
- So Sus, Canadian electronic music producer
- Sus (rapper), British rapper

== Health, education, and sport ==
- Sistema Único de Saúde, Brazil's publicly funded health care system
- Stavanger University Hospital (Norwegian: Stavanger Universitetssykehus) in Norway
- State University System of Florida, United States
- Shanghai University of Sport, China
- Scottish Universities Sport, a professional body for university sport
- Club SuS 1896 Bremen, a defunct German association football club
- SuS Schalke, sports club in Westphalia, Germany
- SuS Stadtlohn, sports club in Stadtlohn, Germany

== Science and technology ==
- Omoglymmius sus, a species of beetle
- Sus (genus), the genus of pigs
- Saybolt universal second, a unit of viscosity
- Single UNIX Specification, a group of computer standards
- Software Update Services, a software updating tool from Microsoft
- Stochastic universal sampling
- System usability scale, in systems engineering

== Other uses ==
- Spirit of St. Louis Airport in St. Louis, Missouri, United States
- Young Independents (Icelandic: Ungir sjálfstæðismenn), the youth wing of the Independence Party of Iceland

== See also ==
- Sus law, formerly allowing broad powers to the police in Britain to stop and search
- Sus al-Aksa, a former town in what is now Morocco
- Suspicion (disambiguation)
- Sous, a name for the southwestern part of Morocco from the 13th to 19th centuries
- Suss (disambiguation)
- Sussy (disambiguation)
