= Beatrice Bofia =

Cameroonian basketball player

Personal information
- Born: 9 November 1984 (age 42) Bafia, Mbam-et-Inoubou, Cameroon
- Listed height: 6 ft 7.5 in (2.02 m)
- Listed weight: 200 lb (91 kg)

Career information
- High school: College de l'Unite (Yaoundé, Mfoundi, Cameroon); North Shore Technical (Middleton, Massachusetts); Naperville Central (Naperville, Illinois)
- College: Illinois Central (2004–2006); Arizona (2007–2009)
- WNBA draft: 2009: undrafted
- Position: Center
- Number: 44

Career highlights
- NJCAA Division II champion (2006)

Beatrice Balana Bofia (born 9 November 1984) is a Cameroonian former collegiate basketball player, who last played for the Arizona Wildcats.

== Early life ==
Bofia was born in Bafia, Cameroon to Prosper and Bernadette Bofia and is the older twin sister of Suzy, who was her teammate at Arizona. She is one of 10 children. At 6 feet 7½ inches tall, Bofia played center because of her great height. Bofia began playing basketball at 13 years old. Her younger sister, Suzy, began shortly thereafter.

Bofia began her high school basketball career at College de l'Unite in Cameroon. She later played for two years at North Shore Technical High School in Middleton, Massachusetts and two more years at Naperville Central High School in Illinois.

== Collegiate career ==
=== Illinois Central (2004–2006) ===
Bofia played two seasons of junior college basketball at Illinois Central. She averaged 5.3 points and 4.2 rebounds per game. Illinois Central was the national runner-up during her freshman season and won the NJCAA Division II championship in her sophomore campaign.

=== Arizona (2006–2009) ===
Bofia was recruited by former head coach Joan Bonvicini along with sister Suzy, and the twins both transferred to Arizona prior to the 2006–07 season.

In early November 2006, Beatrice suffered a minor knee injury that kept her off the court for several weeks. She was redshirted and sat out the entire 2006–07 season. She appeared in 60 games for the Wildcats during the following two seasons.

== Tallest female twins ==
Beatrice and Suzy were once considered to be the tallest female twins in the world. However, Guinness World Records list volleyball players Ann and Claire Recht as the tallest. This record is no longer disputed since the Recht sisters were measured again when they were 18 in 2006 and are both at least 6'7". The Bofia sisters do not dispute the record.

== See also ==
- Suzy Bofia
- Human height
- Growth hormone
- Height discrimination
