= Suse =

Suse may refer to:

- Fort Suse, a military installation in the Kurdistan region of Iraq
- Suse Heinze (1920–2018), German diver

== See also ==
- SUSE (disambiguation)
- Sus (disambiguation)
- Susa, an ancient capital of Elam and the Achaemenid Empire
