= Crystal Hana Kim =

American author

- Born: 1987 (age 38–39); New York City, U.S.
- Education: Columbia University (BA, MFA); Hunter College (MSEd)
- Occupation: Novelist
- Writing career
- Notable work: If You Leave Me

- Korean name
- Hangul: 김하나
- RR: Gim Hana
- MR: Kim Hana

Crystal Hana Kim (born 1987) is an American author. She is the author of two novels, The Stone Home and If You Leave Me. Her first novel, If You Leave Me, was named a best book of 2018 by The Washington Post, ALA Booklist, Literary Hub, Cosmopolitan, and others. Kim was named a National Book Foundation's 5 Under 35 honoree in 2022. Her second novel, The Stone Home, was a finalist for the Maya Angelou Book Award.

== Life ==
Kim was born in Queens, New York, in 1987. Kim's parents immigrated from South Korea, and she grew up visiting South Korea often on her summer breaks.

She has a BA and an MFA from Columbia University and an MSEd from Hunter College. She is a Teach For America alum and has taught elementary school, high school, and collegiate writing. She has lived in Chicago, and currently lives in Brooklyn, New York with her husband and son.

Kim was very close to her grandmother growing up, whose stories have inspired her writing. In an interview with The Common, Kim says, "Growing up, I loved hearing about my parents’ and grandparents’ lives in Korea. I'm particularly close to my maternal grandmother, who helped raised me when I was young. Her stories about being a teenaged refugee during the Korean War—the struggles, the uncertainty of life, the barriers placed upon women—always stayed with me."

== If You Leave Me ==
Kim began working on the characters for her first book during her MFA program at Columbia University. "At first, I thought I was writing an interconnected short story collection that would span three generations, but in my last semester my teacher convinced me that I should write a novel about the first generation. I’m so glad I heeded his advice!" Kim told The Rumpus.

If You Leave Me was published by William Morrow, an imprint of HarperCollins, in August 2018.

Set in Korea during the 1950s and '60s, it was called "a sweeping, poignant story of war, love, and the gifts and bindings of family" by Electric Literature. People magazine called it "an immersive, heartbreaking story about war, passion, and the road not taken.” ELLE Magazine said, "As it travels between the decades during and after the Korean War to reveal the traumatic decisions that war forces each person to make, the riches of If You Leave Me will leave you contemplating the passage of time and its impact on the ties that we keep." The Rumpus said, "Kim’s generosity of detail so completely transports the reader to Korea (1951–1967), and her commitment to perspective makes for a polyphonically rich and heart wrenching experience."

On one of her main characters, Haemi, Kim says:

"It’s so important for us to write complex, realistic women because that’s what we are. Especially in our current political state, women are talked about in very one-dimensional ways, and this trope in literature of “unlikable women” is so silly because we don’t need to be likable, especially now. We need people to see us as complicated and full of depth. So I really wanted to write Haemi as someone the reader would understand deeply and would want to root for, but also argue with, the way that you would argue with a friend—you understand where they’re coming from, even if you don’t agree with every decision they make. "

In an interview with Naima Coster in Electric Literature, who Kim attended the Columbia MFA program with, she said that, "As a writer, my goal is to delve into the mindset of my characters, not to use them as vehicles to represent some idealized version of the 'perfect Korean.'"
