= Suchitra (disambiguation) =

Suchitra is an Indian singer and actress.

Suchitra may also refer to

== People ==
- Suchitra Bharani, Princess of Siam
- Suchitra Bhattacharya (1950–2015), Indian novelist
- Suchitra Chandrabose, Indian Telugu choreographer
- Suchitra Krishnamoorthi (born 1975), Indian actress, writer, painter and singer
- Suchitra Mattai (born 1973), Guyanese-born American contemporary artist
- Suchitra Mitra (1924–2011), Indian singer, composer, and artist exponent
- Suchitra Murali, Indian film actress
- Suchitra Naik, Indian politician
- Suchitra Pillai, Indian actress, singer, model, anchor and VJ
- Suchitra Sebastian, Condensed matter physicist
- Suchitra Sen, Indian Bengali actress
- Suchitra Singh, Indian cricketer

== Others ==
- Suchitra Center, Cross roads in Telangana, India

== See also ==
- Suchi (disambiguation), nickname from Suchitra
