= Lost in the Crowd =

2010 American documentary film

Lost in the Crowd Doc Film
- Film poster
- Directed by: Susi Graf
- Produced by: Susi Graf
- Cinematography: Justin Kramer, Adam Kuhn, Franz Harland, Fernando Garcia Moran
- Edited by: Christoffer Koller, Matthew Kirk; Additional: Raini Ashare, Mark Tracy
- Music by: Nicholas Wright
- Release date: June 26, 2010 (Frameline)
- Running time: 72 minutes
- Country: United States
- Language: English

Lost in the Crowd is a documentary film by Austrian filmmaker Susi Graf about LGBT homeless youth in New York City. The film tells the story of a group of kids focusing on how they became homeless and their attempts to survive on the streets of New York. Their struggles with addiction, sex work, and HIV are portrayed throughout the film and told by the featured personalities in the film. Most of the youth say the reason they are homeless is because they have been rejected by their families for being gay or transgender. The lives of LGBT youth in shelters are portrayed, as well as finding "new" families in the ballroom scene, featuring ballroom icon Willi Ninja who died shortly after being filmed for Lost in the Crowd.

The film premiered at the 2010 Frameline Film Festival.

.

== The Shelter Life ==
A handful of youth-oriented shelters are explored in the film. Homeless teenagers stay in these shelters; however, some of the shelters have strict guidelines that conflict with the lifestyles of those who rely on them. Some of the youth in the film have jobs that keep them until after the shelter's curfew. The main problem with the shelters, as it is made expressly clear in the film, is capacity. Homeless teenagers outnumber shelters by thousands.

The Neutral Zone
In the documentary, this shelter is known as a "drop-in" center. Youth can visit during the day, but overnight services are not offered. Statistics show that there are 20,000 to 32,000 youth on the streets of New York City. 40% of these youth are a member of the queer community. Based on these statistics, there are an estimated 8000 homeless LGBTQ youth, fighting to survive every struggle on the streets. Yet there are few places for them to turn. The Neutral Zone welcomes LBGTQ youth four nights a week to take haven in a safe, supervised, drug-free space. In the last three months alone, The Neutral Zone had 1247 drop-in visits and served almost 600 free meals.

Safe Space
The Safe Space is also a "drop-in" center

Sylvia's Place
Another form of support in the documentary is Sylvia's Place, a shelter which purpose is to function as an emergency accommodation in the sense of a place to safely sleep for queer youth who are homeless. They provide food, clothing, medical care, and basic services. It is located at the Metropolitan Community Church in Midtown New York, which also a food pantry

Some of the youth featured in the film are members of ballroom dance houses. Alex and Serenity are members of the House of Ninja, founded by ball house legend Willi Ninja who was featured in the documentary Paris is Burning. Many of the kids use this as a refuge from the shelters or the street. House leaders see this as a positive influence on the kids since it gives them an opportunity to compete against other houses and builds self-esteem.

Ballroom

Some of the personalities featured in the film are members of ballroom dance houses and take part in Ball culture. Alex and Serenity are members of the House of Ninja, founded by legend Willi Ninja who was featured in the documentary Paris Is Burning. Many queer people of color use ballroom as a form of refuge from the shelters or the street. House leaders see this as a positive influence on the kids since it gives them an opportunity to compete against other houses and builds self-esteem.

== Featured personalities ==
Kimy

Kimy hitchhiked from Utah to New York. He was arrested several times along the way for drug charges, and charges related to prostitution. As a baby he was adopted by a wealthy lobbyist. At 17 he was kicked out of his house because of the trouble he fell in with drugs, as well as his being transgender. The film crew met him at Sylvia's shelter in New York. Kimy dreams of becoming a fashion designer. Shortly after filming Kimy was arrested and is serving a jail sentence in upstate New York. Kimy presently identifies as a beautiful androgynous human being.

Serenity

The film crew met Serenity at the Safe Space drop-in center where she was attending choreography lesson. She likes to dance and attend balls and is associated with the House of Ninja.

Alex

Alex was kicked out of home at the age of 15 for being gay. Alex's mother, someone who had been losing a struggle against drug addiction, discovered a gay adult magazine in his room. The same night, when Alex returned home, he found himself locked out. While still a minor he worked in the porn industry, appearing in several adult films. Alex likes to dance and was a member of the House of Ninja.

Adrian

Adrian was adopted into a very religious family together with his two biological brothers, joining the nine children of the family. Adrian's gay lifestyle and drug use got him kicked out of his house and a restraining order prohibited him from returning home.

Nicole

Currently no information is available on Nicole. According to the film's website, she is "lost in the crowd". She has not been seen in the shelters and, like several others featured in the film, could not be reached for a follow-up interview.

Jazmine

Jazmine is originally from Puerto Rico. She earned a Master's degree and works as a social worker and counselor. She lives a heterosexual life with her straight boyfriend. Jazmine used to be a star in the voguing ballroom scene.

Sunshine

Sunshine's father died when she was 9, and her mother died when she was 18. Shortly after, she moved with her boyfriend to California, then Texas, and finally New York.

Clayton

During the film, Clayton volunteers for the shelters and also works a late night job. This keeps him from utilizing some of the shelters since many of them have a curfew in place. Clayton has since obtained an apartment of his own by means of government services because of his HIV status.
