= Vered =

Vered (Hebrew: וֶרֶד wéreḏ) is a Hebrew feminine given name, which means "rose." The name may refer to:

== People ==
=== First name ===
- Vered Benami (born 1986), American singer/songwriter
- Vered Borochovski (born 1984), Israeli swimmer
- Vered Buskila (born 1983), Israeli sailor
- Vered Slonim-Nevo (born 1953)
- Vered Tochterman (born 1970), Israeli writer

=== Surname ===
- Idan Vered (born 1989), Israeli football player
- Ilana Vered (born 1943), Israeli pianist
- Jerome Vered (born 1958), American writer and game show contestant
- Omer Vered (born 1990), Israeli football player
- Ora Vered, Israeli beauty queen

== See also ==
- Rose (given name)
- Shoshana
