= SUSE =

SUSE may refer to:

- Sichuan University of Science and Engineering (SUSE), a public university in Zigong, Sichuan, China
- SUSE S.A., an open-source software company based in Luxembourg
  - openSUSE, an open-source Linux distribution
  - SUSE Linux Enterprise

== See also ==
- Suse (disambiguation)
