= Sawsan =

Sawsan (Arabic: سوسن) is a given name equivalent to English Susan. Notable people with the name include:

- Sawsan Abd-Elrahman Hakim (born 1956), Syrian agricultural scientist, researcher and author
- Sawsan Ali Sharifi (born 1956), Iraqi politician
- Sawsan Al Majali (born 1960), Jordanian politician
- Sawsan al-Sha'er (born 1956), Bahraini journalist
- Sawsan Amer (born 1937), Egyptian painter
- Sawsan Badr (born 1959), Egyptian actress
- Sawsan Chebli (born 1978), German politician
- Sawsan Kamal, Bahraini politician
- Sawsan Rabie (1962–2021), Egyptian actress
- Sawsan Taqawi (born 1972), Bahraini politician

== See also ==
- Sousan
