= Suzette (given name) =

Suzette or Susette is a given name. Short forms include Suse, Suze, and Zet. Notable people with the name include:

- Suzette Charles (born 1963), American singer, entertainer, and actress
- Suzette Cooke (born 1949), American politician
- Suzette Couture, cofounder with Pierre Sarrazin of Sarrazin Couture Entertainment in Canada
- Suzette Defoye (1741–1787), French ballet dancer, stage actor, opera singer and theatre director
- Suzette Doctolero (born 1968), Filipino screenwriter
- Suzette Haden Elgin (1936–2015), American science fiction author
- Susette La Flesche (1854–1903), Native American writer, lecturer, interpreter and artist of the Omaha tribe in Nebraska
- Lilian Suzette Gibbs (1870–1925), British botanist who worked for the British Museum in London
- Fay Suzette Godwin (1931–2005), British photographer known for her black-and-white landscapes
- Keylin Suzette Gómez (born 1989), Miss Universo Honduras 2011
- Susette Borkenstein Gontard, (1769–1802), inspiration for German poet Friedrich Hölderlin's novel Hyperion
- Suzette Gresham, American chef
- Suzette Forgues Halasz (1918–2004), Canadian cellist and music educator
- Suzette Holten (1863–1937), Danish painter and ceramist in the Skovgaard family of artists
- Suzette Jordan (1974–2015), women's-rights activist and anti-rape campaigner from Kolkata, India
- Suzette Kimball, American geologist, environmental scientist, director of the United States Geological Survey
- Suzette Labrousse (1747–1821), French medium, known for her prophecies during the French Revolution
- Suzette Lee (born 1975), Jamaican triple jumper
- Suzette M. Malveaux (born 1966), Professor of Law at the Columbus School of Law, Catholic University of America
- Suzette Mayr, Canadian poet and novelist
- Suzette Raines, American politician and a Republican member of the West Virginia House of Delegates
- Suzette Ranillo (born 1961), Filipino actress
- Suzette Quintanilla, sister of late singer Selena Quintanilla-Perez
- Mari Susette Sandoz (1896–1966), Nebraska novelist, biographer, lecturer, and teacher
- Dine Suzette (born 1991), Seychellois football player

== See also ==
- Suzette (commune), commune in the Provence-Alpes-Côte d'Azur region in southeastern France
- "Suzette" (song), a 1992 single by Dany Brillant
- Cape Suzette, fictional city in TaleSpin, half-hour Disney animated adventure series
- Crêpe Suzette, French dessert consisting of a crêpe with beurre Suzette
- La Semaine de Suzette, French magazine which appeared from 1905 until 1960, aimed at girls
- Suse (disambiguation)
- Suze (disambiguation)
