= Susana =

Susana may refer to:

- Jarlín Susana (born 2004), Dominican baseball player
- Sustainable Sanitation Alliance (SuSanA), a network of organizations active in the field of sustainable sanitation
- Susana (given name), a feminine given name (including a list of people with the name)
- Susana (magazine), an Argentine magazine for women
- Susana (film), a 1951 Mexican film
- Susana (singer), a Dutch trance music vocalist
- Susana, a 1992 song by Ricky Martin, a cover version of Suzanne by VOF de Kunst

== See also ==
- Santa Susana (disambiguation)
- Susanna (disambiguation)
