= Suzi =

Suzi is an English nickname for people with names such as Susan, Suzanne, Susanna or Susannah.

== Notable people ==
- Suzi Battersby
- Suzi Digby
- Suzi Ferrer (1940–2006), US/Puerto Rican visual artist and feminist
- Suzi Gardner
- Suzi de Givenchy
- Suzi Lane
- Suzi Leather
- Suzi Lovegrove
- Suzi Oppenheimer
- Suzi Perry
- Suzi Quatro
- Suzi Ragsdale
- Suzi Ruffell
- Suzi Schott
- Suzi Shelton
- Suzi Simpson
- Suzi Wu

== Fictional characters ==
- Suzi, character on Camp Lakebottom

== See also ==
- Suzi, Iran, a village in Khuzestan Province, Iran
- Suži, a neighborhood in Riga, Latvia
- Susie (disambiguation)
- Susi (disambiguation)
- Susy (disambiguation)
- Suzie (disambiguation)
- Suzy (disambiguation)
