= Sukie (disambiguation) =

Sukie is an English four piece indie rock band, named after actress and singer Sukie Smith.

Sukie may also refer to:

- Sukie Rougemont, fictional character in The Witches of Eastwick and in the film based on it
- Sukie Smith (born 1964), English actress and musician
- Principessa Sukie Tempesta, fictional character in Nobody Lives for Ever by John Gardner
- Sukierae, an album by rock band Tweedy (2014)

== See also ==
- Suki (disambiguation)
- Sookie
- Susan
