= Kim Ji-soo =

Kim Ji-soo may refer to:

- Kim Ji-soo (actress, born 1972), South Korean actress
- Kim Ji-soo (baseball) (born 1986), South Korean baseball player
- Kim Ji-soo (singer, born 1990), South Korean singer
- Ji Soo (Kim Ji-soo, born 1993), South Korean actor
- Kim Ji-soo (skeleton racer) (born 1994), South Korean skeleton racer
- Jisoo (Kim Ji-soo, born 1995), South Korean singer and actress, member of girl group Blackpink
- Kim Ji-su (judoka) (born 2000), South Korean judoka
- Kim Ji-soo (footballer) (born 2004), South Korean footballer
