= Suji =

Suji may refer to:

== Food ==
- Suji, a Japanese dish made from tendons; see tendon as food
- The South Asian name for semolina, a food ingredient

== People ==
- Su-ji, a Korean given name (and a list of people with various English spellings of the name)
- Martin Suji (born 1971), Kenyan cricketer
- Tony Suji (born 1976), Kenyan cricketer

== Places ==
- Suji-gu, a city district in Yongin City, South Korea, approximately 40km south of Seoul
- Suji, Kilimanjaro, a small village in the north-eastern region of Tanzania
- Suji railway station, Inner Mongolia, China

== See also ==
- Sooji (disambiguation)
- Suji Uttapam, a variant of Uttapam, a South Indian thick pancake
- Jisu (disambiguation), including Ji-Su values
- Su (disambiguation)
- Ji (disambiguation)
