= Susanna Minguell =

Spanish philosopher and writer (born 1983)

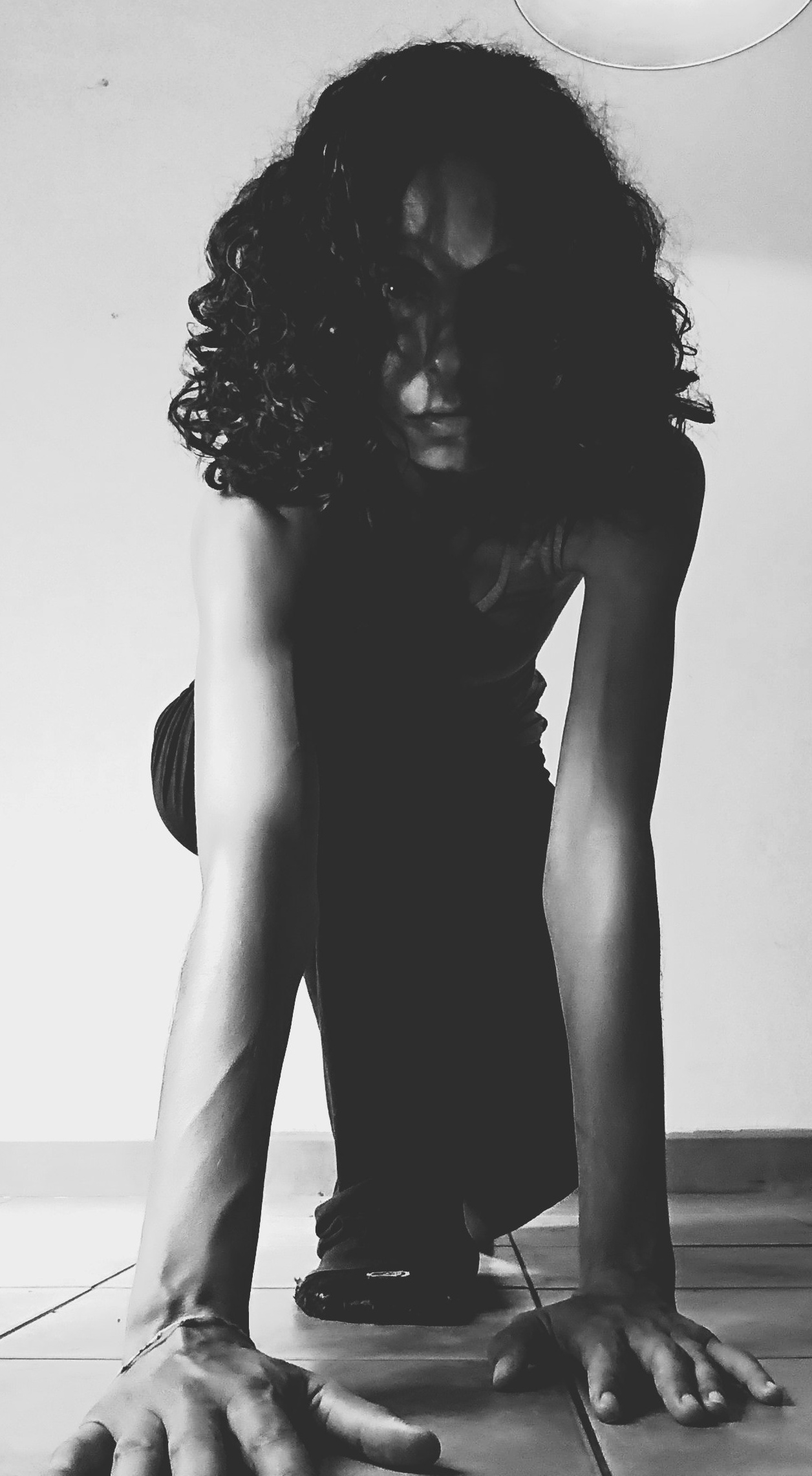
- Born: 1983 (age 41–42); Barcelona, Catalonia, Spain
- Occupations: Philosopher, writer

Susanna Minguell (born 1983) is a Spanish lesbian philosopher and writer. Her work focuses on the themes of control and power.

== Biography ==
Minguell studied philosophy and humanities at the University of Barcelona. She considers that the French philosopher, historian, sociologist and psychologist Michel Foucault has influenced her career. She worked in a psychiatric center, where she began working at the age of 23 as a supervisor in the emergency service. Having been diagnosed with severe depression as a difficult experience, she was given antidepressants and advised to leave her job at the age of 25.

As a child Minguell suffered abuse, both psychological and sexual, and her memories were blocked for years. But when she turned 28, the memories returned and she returned to the psychologist where she was again prescribed antidepressants. During this stage, she wrote poems and other types of texts and made self-portraits. Although she has dealt with different subjects, she distinguishes four axes or blocks in her work: temporary amnesia, silence, rupture and moment of force. In 2019, she published her work Dislocated Words: Nakedness from the Ashes in which, through poems, stories and images, she addresses the recovery from sexual abuse in childhood. She proposes a personal path from amnesia to empowerment, breaking with the role of victim.

Minguell has held training workshops to raise awareness of sexual abuse of minors, always linked to art, such as the one organized in Tolosa in 2021.

== Bibliography ==
- 2019 – Palabras dislocadas: desnudez desde las cenizas. Editorial Descontrol. ISBN 9788417190637.
