= Sawsan Abd-Elrahman Hakim =

Scientist, researcher and author

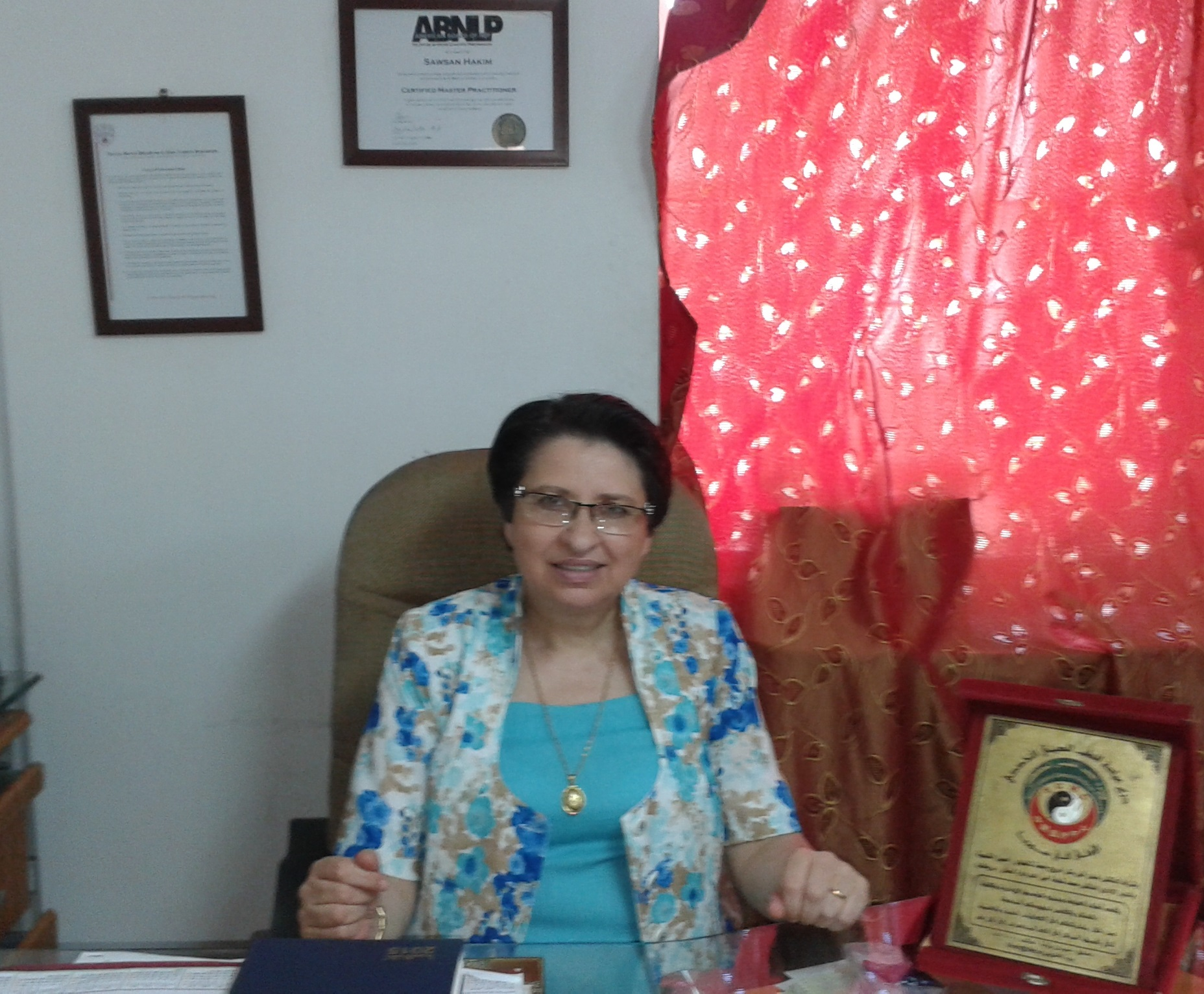

Sawsan Abd-Elrahman Hakim (born 4 June 1956 in Latakia, Syria) is a scientist, researcher and author, who is an expert in agricultural science. Hakim has established Hakim's Center for Science and Creativity that funds the projects of young scientists and researchers.

== Education and career ==
In 1977 Hakim graduated from Tishreen University with a science degree in agriculture. The following year Hakim began working at the university as an educator, teaching courses in plant breeding, seed production and testing, crop breeding, and medicinal and aromatic plants. Hakim returned to college to receive a master's degree from ICARDA in 1992 and between 2005 and 2006, earned a practitioner/advanced practitioner degree in neuro-linguistic programming (NLP) from the American Board of Neuro-Linguistic Programming (ABNLP).

Hakim is a member of the ABNLP and was certified as a trainer by the American Board of Neuro-Linguistic Programming in 2015. She founded and managed the Hakim Center for the Sciences of Excellence and Creativity, a specialist in the fields of self-development sciences, human capacities, human development programs and neuro linguistic programming.

== Research ==
- An Evaluation Study for Biodegradable Wheat (T.dicoccum).
- Genetic variations of gladinates in dicocum wheat using electrolytes.
- A study of the performance of four varieties of hard wheat (T.dicoccum var durum) in the Buqa region of the Syrian coast.
- Genetic variations in dillum wheat (T.dicoccum), for use in wheat breeding for agriculture in dry areas.
- Evaluation of variations in wheat grain for use in wheat improvement under environmental stress conditions.
- Variations in proteins stored in bovine wheat.

== Legacy ==
Hakim received a patent of appreciation by the University of Tishreen on the scientific research presented on the occasion of the thirty-first science week in 1991. In 2009 she obtained the Shield of the Chinese Specialized Medicine Clinic in 2009.

== Publications ==
- Production of medicinal and aromatic plants in 2007.
- Field Crops Cultivation in 2003.
