= Susanna (Stradella) =

1681 Oratorio in two parts

La Susanna is a 1681 oratorio in two parts by Alessandro Stradella for Francesco II, Duke of Modena for the Oratory of San Carlo.

== Roles ==
- Susanna (soprano)
- Daniele (castrato / soprano)
- Testo (castrato / countertenor)
- Primo Giudice (bass)
- Secondo Giudice (tenor)

== Recordings ==
- La Susanna - Marjanne Kweksilber, Judith Nelson, René Jacobs, Martyn Hill and Ulrik Cold. Alan Curtis (conductor) 1978
- La Susanna - Emanuela Galli, Susanna (soprano) Barbara Zanichelli, Daniele (soprano) Roberto Balconi, Testo (countertenor) Luca Dordolo, Secondo Giudice (tenor) Matteo Bellotto, Primo Giudice (bass) Ensemble Aurora Enrico Gatti, Glossa 2004
- La Susanna - Gemma Bertagnolli (soprano) - Susanna; Isabel Alvarez (soprano) - Daniele; Martin Oro (alto) - Testo; Mirko Guadagnini (tenor) - Secondo Giudice; Sergio Foresti (bass) - Primo Giudice Harmonices Mundi/Claudio Astronio recorded live 2011, Schloss Maretsch, Bolzano, Brilliant
