= Susy Schultz =

American journalist

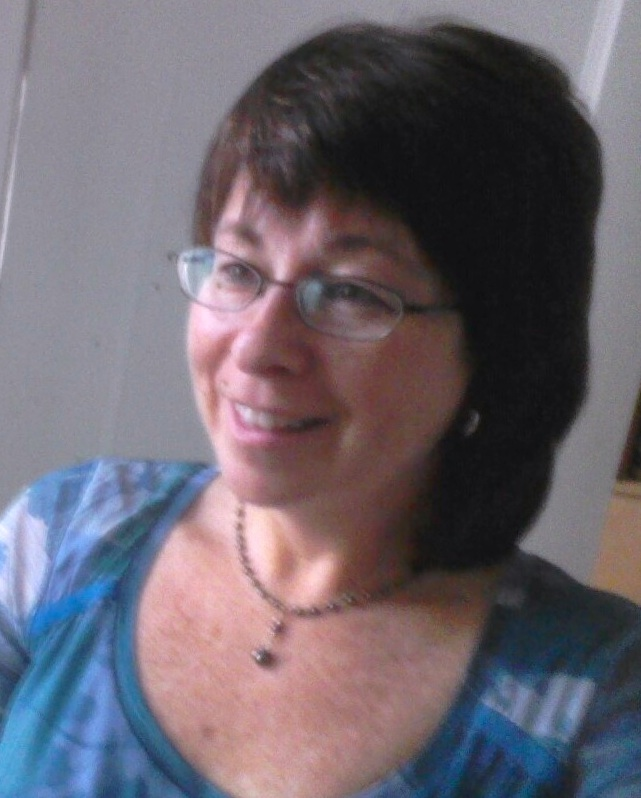
- Susy Schultz
- Born: 1959 or 1960 (age 66–67)
- Education: Lawrence University
- Occupation: Journalist

Susy Schultz (born c. 1960) is an American journalist, educator and social advocate. She was the executive director of the Museum of Broadcast Communications in Chicago from July 2019 until September 2021. She formerly was president of the Public Narrative in Chicago. She was named one of the "most powerful women in Chicago journalism" by the media critic of the Chicago Tribune.

== Early life ==
Schultz was born circa 1960 to Vernette and Robert G. Schultz; the latter was a journalist (died 1989). Schultz graduated from Lawrence University in 1981, originally planning to become a teacher. She taught undergraduate and graduate journalism at Northwestern University, Columbia College Chicago and Roosevelt University.

== Career ==
Schultz, after a stint at the City News Bureau of Chicago, she joined the Chicago Sun-Times in 1984, where for 14 years she covered a wide range of stories, earning a number of awards including a Pulitzer Prize nomination.

After leaving the Sun-Times in 1998, she worked in the Department of Health and Human Services, serving as the regional affairs specialist for Hannah Rosenthal, who oversaw the six-state Midwest region – the country's most populated region. Later she worked with Sister Sheila Lynne, commissioner of the Chicago Department of Public Health, where she organized communications, training all senior management and developing a message and brand for public health. She also headed up the media committee of the city's strategic violence prevention plan. She worked for two years as consulting editor at The Chicago Reporter, a training ground for investigative reporters. For four years starting in 2002, she was editor (later promoted to editor and associate publisher) of Chicago Parent magazine. During her tenure, the University of Missouri School of Journalism named it the top regional parenting magazine in the nation for three consecutive years. Schultz was also during this time a member of the 2002 Chicago celebrity cast of The Vagina Monologues.

She served as director of advocacy and communication for the Chicago Foundation for Women, where she helped coordinate a year-long statewide anti-violence initiative titled "What Will It Take?". She authored the initiative's 143-page report. In 2007, she was recruited to be managing editor for The Daily Journal, which serves the Kankakee region directly south of Chicago, and readership consultant to the Small Newspaper Group, Inc. a chain of newspapers and magazines reaching across much of the Middle West. The newspaper, during her four years there, won a number of national and state awards. She also served as a readership consultant to SNG, Inc., which publishes The Daily Journal and other newspapers in Illinois and Minnesota.

In 2013, she became president of journalism non-profit Public Narrative, a role she served in for six years. In 2019, she was named the executive director for the Museum of Broadcast Communications.

In April 2022, it was announced she named editor of Everston RoundTable, a local non-profit news organization based north of Chicago.

Schultz has written for the Chicago Tribune, the Los Angeles Times Syndicate, the New York Times Syndicate and News Service and the St. Paul Pioneer Press. Her radio commentaries have been heard on Minnesota Public Radio.

The president of Journalism & Women's Symposium (JAWS) in 2003, she also was a founding member of the Chicago chapter of the Association for Women Journalists in 1993, and later chapter president.

== Personal life ==
Schultz is the mother of two sons, Bryant and Zachary. She was married to Sun-Times columnist Zay N. Smith from 1984 until their divorce in 2013. Schultz later remarried but remained close with Smith until his death in 2020.
