= Sousan Azadi =

Iranian writer

Sousan Azadi is an Iranian author and designer born in 1954.

The 1987 memoir Out of Iran, written by Sousan Azadi and Angela Ferrante, was released by Time Warner's imprint Little, Brown and Company. Her experiences in Iran during the Islamic Revolution of 1979, her brief detention at the time, and her final flight from the nation are all detailed in the book.

She used the pen name Azadi to shield her family from abuse while they were in Iran. She claims to be a great-granddaughter of the Qajar dynasty.

Currently, Azadi resides in Canada, where she creates and markets jewelry.

== Bibliography ==
- Vlucht Uit Iran, 1987 (Co-authored with Ferrante Angela) ISBN 978-9-051-08083-4
- Azad, Sousan (1988). Out Of Iran: One Woman's Escape from the Ayatollahs/Flucht aus Iran. Eine Frau entrinnt den Klauen des Ayatollahs. Seal Books. ISBN 978-0-751-50910-6. (Persian and English Edition)
- IRANMADHUN SUTAKA, 1991 ISBN 978-3-883-50300-4
- Azadi, Sousan (1992). Im Spiegel der Zeit. Erlebtes, Erfahrenes, Erforschtes. ISBN 978-3-870-70393-6.
- Azadi, Sousan (1991). Fugitive. FRANCE LOISIRS / CALMANN-LEVY. p. 324. ISBN 978-2-724-26458-6.
- Die letzte Jagd. / Flucht aus Iran. / Sturz ins Leere., 1993 (Co-authored with Nehberg, Rüdiger and Joe Simpson)
- IRANMADHUN SUTAKA, 2009 ISBN 978-8-184-98074-5
