= Sussan Nourshargh =

British immunologist and pharmacologist

- Education: University College London
- Occupation: Professor of Microvascular Pharmacology

Sussan Nourshargh is a British immunologist, pharmacologist, and professor of microvascular pharmacology and immunopharmacology. She founded the Centre for Microvascular research at Queen Mary University.

== Career ==
Sussan Nourshargh studied pharmacology (BSc) at University College London and did her PhD at King's College London.

Nourshargh held a post-doctoral research scientist post in vascular biology at MRC Clinical Sciences Centre, London between 1986-1988. In 1988 she became a senior lecturer within the department of Applied Pharmacology at the National Heart and Lung Institute, part of Imperial College London.

In 2006, Nourshargh became a professor of immunopharmacology at Imperial College London, a year later she founded the Centre for Microvascular Research within the William Harvey Research Institute at Queen Mary University.

== Awards ==
- 2016: The Gabor Kaley Prize in Microcirculation Research from the American Societies of Physiology and Microcirculation.
- 2014: The Astra Zeneca Prize for Women in Pharmacology from the British Pharmacology Society.
- 2001: Quintiles Prize for outstanding contribution to Immunopharmacology from the British Pharmacology Society.

== Fellowships ==
- 2012: Wellcome Trust Senior Investigator Award.
- 2012: Fellow of the Academy of Medical Sciences.
- 2010: Fellow of the Society of Biology.
- 2005: Fellow of the British Pharmacological Society.
- 1996: Wellcome Trust University Award.
- 1990: Wellcome Trust Career Development Fellowship.

== Memberships ==
- 2015 - current: British Heart Foundation Board of Trustees and Advisory Council
- 2015-2018: Wellcome Trust’s Biomedical Resources & Multi-User Equipment Committee
- 2015-2017: Academy of Medical Sciences Springboard Panel
- 2012-2017: Chair and Member of the Academy of Medical Sciences Committee (SC3) for selection of new fellows
- 2014-2016: Royal Society’s Newton Advanced Fellowship Panel
- 2011-2014: British Heart Foundation Fellowship Committee
- 2012-2016: Wellcome Trust’s Peer Review College
- 2007-2016: Treasurer of the UK Adhesion Society
- 2013 - current: Editor, European Journal of Immunology
- 2010-2013: Editor, British Journal of Pharmacology
