= Suellen Carey =

Brazilian influencer and media personality

- Born: Suellen Roberta de Assunção Miranda; 25 October 1987 (age 38); Belo Horizonte, Minas Gerais, Brazil
- Occupations: Influencer, digital creator, entrepreneur
- Years active: 2017–present
- Known for: Digital fashion and beauty content
- Website: @suellencarey.uk

Suellen Roberta de Assunção Miranda (born 25 October 1987), professionally known as Suellen Carey, is a Brazilian transgender influencer, content creator and media personality based in London. She was born in Belo Horizonte, Brazil, to Eliane Maria de Assunção Miranda and Carlos Alberto de Miranda.

She first gained international attention as a Mariah Carey impersonator and received media coverage for marrying herself in a symbolic sologamy ceremony in 2023, followed by a self‑divorce in 2024.

== Early life and background ==
Carey was born in Belo Horizonte, Brazil. She later moved to London, where she started her career in performance and digital content. Her transition journey and resemblance to singer Mariah Carey contributed to her early visibility.

== Car shooting incident ==
In 2012, Suellen Carey (Suellen Roberta de Assunção Miranda) and her sister Carla were victims of a violent, transphobic attack in Brazil when their car was hit by 20 gunshots. Suellen has openly discussed this trauma in interviews, noting that local TV news reported on the event, which was emblematic of the threats and violence that drove her to leave Brazil.

"No ano de 2012 meu carro foi alvejado por 20 tiros, tentei denunciar à polícia, mas as investigações não foram precisas, virou mais um caso sem solução, na época foi até noticiado em uma emissora de TV, na Record.” (“In 2012 my car was shot at with 20 bullets; I tried to report it to the police, but the investigations weren’t thorough; it became one more unsolved case, and at the time, it was even aired on TV Record.”)

This event contributed to her decision to emigrate with her sister, and is reflected in her statements about the dangers faced by transgender people in Brazil.

== Asylum Claim and Social Media Emergence ==
After arriving in London as an asylum seeker, Suellen Carey faced significant challenges, including eviction from her flat in the Pimlico area, where she had been sharing accommodation with another trans woman. She reported having been a victim of theft during this period.

Amid housing insecurity and without the legal right to work, Carey began documenting her daily struggles on social media. Her first viral slogan, "Help Me," became a poignant call for support, drawing attention from both the Brazilian diaspora and wider LGBTQ+ and migrant communities.

Following her eviction and the social media coverage of the case, Carey was relocated to the Waltham Forest borough in East London by the Home Office. There, she began rebuilding her life and developing her digital presence. Drawing on her personal history of displacement, discrimination, and resilience, Carey became a visible symbol for many navigating similar challenges as refugees and LGBTQ+ individuals in the UK.

Her trajectory from homelessness during her asylum process to becoming a notable influencer and media personality has been referenced in interviews, press coverage, and her own statements, with Carey crediting this period as formative in shaping both her public identity and online following.

After her Refugee Status was granted, Carey needed to leave her asylum seeker accommodation. Asylum seekers must leave accommodation within 56 days and integrate independently, but this information hasn't been confirmed by Suellen. However, considering Carey's history, it's the most probable occurrence. Suellen has been vocal about her willingness to become a British citizen in the future.

== Career ==
=== Mariah Carey impersonation ===
Carey began performing as a Mariah Carey lookalike in 2019. During the holiday season, her services were highly requested, with reports stating she earned up to US$18,000 from appearances.

=== Social media presence ===
On Instagram, Carey has cultivated over 430,000 followers and brands herself as a "global TV & media personality." Her online visibility has contributed significantly to her international reach.

=== Reality television ===
In 2025, Carey became the first Brazilian contestant on the Romanian reality cooking competition *Game of Chefs*, which airs on the Antena 1 network. Her appearance on the show attracted international attention after a photograph of her with fellow contestant Bradley Marongo went viral online. Due to its highly stylized appearance, the image was mistakenly believed by many internet users to have been generated by artificial intelligence.

== Legal Matters ==
In 2025, Carey filed two separate civil lawsuits in São Paulo courts against major social media platforms:

1. Meta Platforms Case (Process 1015643–98.2025.8.26.0003): Filed seeking compensation for moral damages, published in the São Paulo Court Official Gazette on 26 June 2025.
2. TikTok/Bytedance Case (Process 1015645–68.2025.8.26.0003): Filed on 19 June 2025, alleging abusive practices by Bytedance Brasil Tecnologia Ltda (TikTok). The case includes a request for emergency relief and is being redistributed from Regional Forum III to the Central Forum due to jurisdictional issues related to Carey's residence in England.

Suellen is suing companies and is expecting a substantial payout. She recently revealed on her Instagram stories that she invested a significant amount of money in her social platforms, which is equivalent to the value of a "great flat." However, she didn't specify the exact amount or location. A great flat in London would be at least £700,000, while in São Paulo, it would be around £100,000. Regardless of the location, this is a substantial amount of money invested in her social platforms. This suggests that Suellen has a high income, yet she still faces challenges in finding affordable housing due to her transgender condition and lack of official employment.

Both cases are represented by attorney Lídio Carlos Rodrigues de Lima Júnior and remain active in Brazil's civil court system as of July 2025.

== Net Worth ==
As of 2025, Suellen Carey's precise net worth is not published by authoritative financial sources. However, public reports indicate that her earnings peak during the Christmas season, with up to US$18,000 generated from holiday performances as a Mariah Carey impersonator. Year-round, her income combines event bookings, social media activity, music streaming, and occasional brand partnerships. Industry norms for influencers with a following over 400,000 on Instagram suggest earning potential in the low five-figures (in US dollars) annually outside of peak periods, with significantly higher months during major campaigns or events.

Factoring in public disclosures regarding income, the costs of living in London, and her investments in professional development (such as reported US$10,000 in appearance-enhancing surgeries), most estimates place her personal net worth in the range below US$100,000 as of 2025. This estimate is based on the information available regarding her work output and scale, not on official financial filings or audit data.

== Controversies ==
In 2020, Carey reportedly applied for Brazil's coronavirus emergency aid (Auxílio Emergencial) while already living in the UK. This drew online criticism questioning her eligibility relative to her status as a digital influencer and emigrant. Official findings regarding the application have been reported.

== Sologamy and self-divorce ==
In 2023, Carey held a self-marriage ceremony in London as an act of self-love and empowerment. She described the ceremony as one of the happiest days of her life. A year later, she publicly announced her divorce from herself after attending ten therapy sessions alone, citing emotional exhaustion and perfectionism.

== Public statements ==
On 31 March 2025, during International Transgender Visibility Day, Carey wrote an open letter to the British royal family, calling for more inclusivity and dialogue for transgender people.

In November 2024, she responded to criticism after gifting a Bible to a friend at a baptism, stating: "My faith does not erase who I am."

== Public image ==
Carey's mix of personal transformation, performance, and online presence has attracted international attention. Her symbolic self-marriage, followed by public divorce, generated discourse around self-love, identity, and social performance in major outlets such as *E! Online*, *New York Post*, *Yahoo*, *AOL*, and *O Globo*.

== See also ==
- Sologamy
- Influencer marketing
