= If You Leave Me =

- First edition (publ. William Morrow)
- Author: Crystal Hana Kim
- Language: English
- Publication date: 2018

If You Leave Me (2018) is the debut novel of Crystal Hana Kim that was recognized as one of the best books of 2018 by The Washington Post, ALA Booklist, and others. This historical fiction novel takes place during the Korean War and focuses on the life of a refugee, Haemi Lee, and her family.

== Synopsis ==
Haemi Lee, a refugee of the Korean War, is forced to move to Busan with her mother and younger brother Hyunki, who suffers from a severe illness. As she settles into her new home, she comes across Kyunghwan, her childhood friend and lover. As they spend time together and rekindle their friendship, Haemi develops romantic feelings for him and decides she wants to further their relationship. For the sake of her family's well-being and economic stability, however, she decides to marry Kyunghwan's cousin Jisoo, who comes from a wealthy family and can provide medicine for Hyunki. Jisoo, satisfied with creating a family to come back to, enlists in the army. Kyunghwan also decides to enlist, leaving Haemi and her family alone for two years. Haemi, bored with her routine life, begins to work for a nearby hospital as a nursing assistant, helping tend to wounded soldiers and prisoners of war. Towards the end of the war, she is given the opportunity to move back to her childhood hometown and decides to settle there. Jisoo returns home to live with Haemi and they have their first child, Solee. Hoping to have a son, Jisoo pressures Haemi to have another child. Following the birth of their second daughter Jieun, Haemi is pressured to have more children, causing her mental and physical health to deteriorate. She begins to regret not pursuing her feelings for Kyunghwan but tries her best to nurture her and Jisoo's family.

Haemi's family life worsens; she does not receive kindness from her husband, and she becomes discontent with her responsibilities. She takes care of her girls and works at an orphanage to escape her mundane role as a housewife. Haemi is left behind by the people who have supported her throughout her life when her mother dies and Hyunki moves to Seoul. Haemi tries to seek support from the people around her but cannot, and her mental health deteriorates. Jisoo takes the family on vacation to Busan, which Haemi dislikes. This causes conflict and they return home, where Haemi continues to struggle with depression. She decides to commit suicide and allows her memories to live through her four daughters.

== Characters ==
- Haemi Lee is the main character.
- Yun Jisoo is Kyunghwan's cousin and Haemi's husband.
- Kyunghwan is the son of an alcoholic and childhood friends with Haemi.
- Hyunki is Haemi's younger brother.
- Mother is Haemi and Hyunki's mother.

== Themes ==
The novel discusses themes including the role of women in East Asian society and the increase of gender inequality during times of war. The author, Crystal Hana Kim, intends to question the acceptance of technological advances and how fast these changes should take the place of traditional ideas during a time of occupation.

=== Historical context ===
This novel takes place during the Korean War and begins in 1951. This war occurred between North Korea and South Korea, each with its own supporting countries. North Korea was supported by China and the Soviet Union, while South Korea was supported by the United Nations, the United States, and Japan.

Through the war, the United States was able to extend its military power across South Korea. This point is important to the novel as it discusses the influence of technology and the introduction of Western culture into Korean society. Additionally, the refugees who were forced to move south to avoid the war were displaced from their homes and began a new life. When they returned to their hometowns, they dealt with the foreign influence that had taken place during their time away.
