= Susie =

Susie is a female name that can be a diminutive form of Susan, Susanne, Suzanne, Susannah, Susanna or Susana.

Susie may also refer to:

== Songs ==
- "Susie", a song by Krokus from Pain Killer
- "Susie", a song by John Lee Hooker from the album Mr. Lucky
- "Susie", a 2018 track by Toby Fox from Deltarune Chapter 1 OST from the video game Deltarune

== Film and TV ==
- Private Secretary (TV series), also known as Susie, an American sitcom
- Susie (film), a Malayalam film
- Susie (TV program), an Australian talk show
- "The Susie", an episode of Seinfeld

== Fictional characters ==
- Susie Myerson, a character in American television series The Marvelous Mrs. Maisel
- Susie, one of the murdered children in the media franchise Five Nights at Freddy's
- Susie (Deltarune), a major character in the video game Deltarune
- Susie, part of the Legion, a killer in Dead by Daylight
- Susie (Kirby), a character in the video game Kirby: Planet Robobot
- Susie McCallister, a character in American television series Summer Camp Island
- Smart Susie Sunset, an animated character in Sesame Street, the partner of Billy Jo Jive
- Susie Carmichael, a recurring character in the animated children's TV series Rugrats and All Grown Up!
- Susie Campbell, an antagonist in Bendy and the Ink Machine
- Susie Derkins, a secondary character in the Calvin and Hobbes comic strip
- Susie Putnam, a recurring character in the Chilling Adventures of Sabrina TV series
- Susie Salmon, the main character in the novel The Lovely Bones by Alice Sebold
- Teacher Susie, a character in the television series Sid the Science Kid
- Susie, the main protagonist from the 1952 Disney's Silly Symphonies cartoon, Susie the Little Blue Coupe
- Susie Swanson (Family Guy), the infant daughter of Joe Swanson from Family Guy
- Susie, a non-purebred golden retriever from the novel, Lord of Mysteries
- Susie Cox, a character in the film JFK

== Other uses ==
- Smart Upper Stage for Innovative Exploration (SUSIE), an Arianespace proposed European space capsule, to transport humans and cargo to LEO and the moon.

== See also ==
- Siouxsie (disambiguation)
- Sussie (disambiguation)
- Susy (disambiguation)
- Sussy (disambiguation)
- Susi (disambiguation)
- Suzi (disambiguation)
- Suzie (disambiguation)
- Suzy (disambiguation)
- Susie's Law
- Su-ji, a Korean given name
