= Susi Kilgore =

Susi Kilgore (born in Marshalltown, Iowa) is an American illustrator, multimedia designer, and painter.

== Biography ==
After graduating from high school in Iowa, she attended Ringling College of Art in Sarasota, Florida. She currently resides in Florida.

== Career ==
Kilgore began her career as a staff artist for public television. She then worked as an advertising director, and in graphic design and editorial illustration. She has been a freelance illustrator since 1978.

Kilgore's illustrations have been made in a variety of artistic media, including watercolour, pastels, and computer rendering. In recent years, she has done work in multimedia design. Her work has been described as embodying "elegantly balanced compositions, subtle colors, and great sense of action and movement". In addition to producing illustrations for books, record album covers, posters, and television, she has worked in interactive children's multimedia. Her illustrations have appeared in major publications such as Sports Illustrated, GQ Magazine and U.S. News & World Report.

== Awards ==
Kilgore has been recognized by her peers a number of times, having been awarded 66th Art Directors Club of New York Annual DESI Award; the Award of Excellence from major graphic design trade periodicals, Communication Arts (1985); Graphis Inc. (1989); and the Award of Merit from the Society of Illustrators (1984, 1985, 1989, 1991).
