= Sussie =

Sussie may refer to:

== Arts, entertainment, and media ==
- Sussie 4, a Mexican electronic music duo
- Slim Susie (Swedish: Smala Sussie), a 2003 Swedish comedy-crime film
- Sussie, a character in the animated sitcom The Amazing World of Gumball

== People ==
- Sussie Eriksson (born 1963), Swedish singer and actress
- Sussie Morrish, Filipina-New Zealand professor of marketing
- Sussie Pedersen (born 1960), Danish wheelchair curler

== See also ==
- Susie (disambiguation)
- Sussy (disambiguation)
