= Susann-Annette Storm =

German attorney and lawyer (born 1957)

- Born: 17 May 1957 (age 69); Stuttgart, Baden-Württemberg, West Germany
- Education: University of Tübingen
- Awards: PhD
- Scientific career
- Fields: Public Administration, Public Law
- Workplaces: University of Mannheim

Susann-Annette Storm (born 17 May 1957 in Stuttgart, Baden-Württemberg, West Germany) is a German attorney and lawyer. She was chancellor (Kanzlerin) of the University of Mannheim from October 2001 to December 2016. Furthermore, Storm was chancellor and representative for all universities situated in Baden-Württemberg during 2005 to 2007. Previously she was a university advisor of the Ministry for Research and Arts of Baden-Württemberg (Ministerium für Wissenschaft und Kunst Baden Württemberg) at which she was responsible for the universities in Mannheim and Karlsruhe.

== Education ==
She obtained her PhD in law at the University of Tübingen in 1990, after having earned the first and second Staatsexamen at the University of Tübingen in 1981 and 1985.
