= Sussy =

Sussy may refer to:

== People ==
- Jean-Baptiste Collin de Sussy (1750–1826), French senior official and politician
  - Jean-Baptiste Henry Collin de Sussy (1776–1837), French politician and son of Jean-Baptiste Collin de Sussy
- Sussy (musician), lead guitarist of Sex Machineguns
- Sussy Derqui (died 1955), Argentine actress and cabaret performer

== Other uses ==
- Sussy (meme), an internet meme and internet slang term based on the online video game Among Us
- Sussy, archaic name for Suxy, a locality in Chiny, Belgium

== See also ==
- Sussey, a commune in Bourgogne-Franche-Comté, France
- Sussi (disambiguation)
- Sussie (disambiguation)
- Sus (disambiguation)
- Suss (disambiguation)
- Susy (disambiguation)
