= USS Suzanne =

Patrol vessel of the United States Navy

History

United States
- Name: USS Suzanne
- Namesake: Previous name retained
- Builder: George Lawley & Son, Neponset, Massachusetts
- Completed: 1908
- Acquired: 18 May 1917
- Commissioned: 18 May 1917
- Stricken: 28 December 1918
- Fate: Returned to owner 28 December 1918
- Notes: Operated as private motor yacht Cristina, Jorosa, and Suzanne 1908–1917, as Suzanne 1918–1938, and as Cristina, Old Horse Eye, and Jo Ho after 1938

General characteristics
- Type: Patrol vessel
- Tonnage: 123 gross register tons
- Length: 110 ft (34 m)
- Beam: 17 ft 6 in (5.33 m)
- Draft: 3 ft 4 in (1.02 m) aft
- Propulsion: Two 125-indicated horsepower (93.2-kilowatt) 4-stroke 6-cylinder gasoline engines, two shafts
- Speed: 13 knots
- Complement: 18
- Armament: 1 × 3-pounder gun; 1 × machine gun

USS Suzanne (SP-510) was a United States Navy patrol vessel in commission from 1917 to 1918.

Suzanne was built as the private motor yacht Cristina in 1908 by George Lawley & Son at Neponset, Massachusetts, for Frederick C. Fletcher of Boston, Massachusetts. She later was renamed Esperanza, then Jorosa, and then Suzanne.

On 18 May 1917, the U.S. Navy acquired Suzanne from her owner – by then F. M. Kirby of Wilkes-Barre, Pennsylvania – for use as a section patrol boat during World War I. She was commissioned as USS Suzanne (SP-510) the same day.

Assigned to the 4th Naval District, Suzanne served on patrol duties there for the remainder of World War I.

Suzanne was stricken from the Navy List on 28 December 1918 and returned to Kirby the same day. She resumed private service as Suzanne until 1938, when she was sold to J. P. Bushong of Sault Ste. Marie, Michigan, and renamed Cristina. She later operated under the names Old Horse Eye and Jo Ho.

Suzanne should not be confused with USS Susanne (SP-411), a patrol vessel in commission at the same time, or with USS Susanne (SP-832), the proposed name and designation for a vessel considered for U.S. Navy service at the same time but never acquired by the Navy.
