= Sukiyaki (disambiguation) =

Sukiyaki may refer to:

- Sukiyaki, a Japanese dish
- "Sukiyaki" (song), a Japanese-language song by Japanese crooner Kyu Sakamoto, originally named "Ue O Muiti Aruko", since covered by various artists
  - Sukiyaki and Other Japanese Hits, 1963 album by Kyu Sakamoto
- Sukiyaki, brand of a series of eateries by MTY Food Group

== See also ==
- Sukiyaki Western Django, 2007 English language Japanese Western film directed by Takashi Miike
