= Santa Susana =

Santa Susana may refer to:

- Susanna (disciple), disciple of Jesus according to the gospel of Luke;
- Susanna of Rome, martyred in 295.

Santa Susana or Santa Susanna may also refer to several places:

- Santa Susana, California, a census-designated place in Ventura County
- Santa Susana Mountains in southern California.
- Santa Susana Mountains, a mountain range northwest of Los Angeles
- Santa Susana Pass, running through the Santa Susana Mountains
- Santa Susana Field Laboratory, near Los Angeles, a test facility for rockets and (formerly) nuclear reactors
- Santa Susanna, Rome, a church on the Quirinal in Rome
- Santa Susanna, Spain, a small town on the Costa del Maresme of Spain
