= Sousan S. Altaie =

American scientific adviser

Sousan Sayahtaheri Altaie
- Education: University of North Texas
- Organization: Children's Hospital of Buffalo
- Notable work: Transplacental transmission of Lyme disease

Sousan S. Altaie is Scientific Policy Advisor for the Office of In Vitro Diagnostic Devices in the United States. She joined the Food and Drug Administration (FDA) in the Center for Drug Evaluation and Research in the Division of Anti-infective Drug Products as a primary reviewer in 1995. Six years later she joined the FDA's Center for Devices and Radiological Health (CDRH) as the chief of Immunology and Molecular Diagnostics Branch. She is actively working as a member of the Global Harmonization Task Force (GHTF) and International Organization for Standardization (ISO) working groups. She was appointed the CDRH critical path coordinator in 2004 and is actively involved in the agency's critical path initiative. She has served as an observer, advisor and full member of various committees and subcommittees of the Clinical and Laboratory Standards Institute (CLSI).

Altaie has been an active member of the Washington, D.C. Branch of the American Society of Microbiology, serving as the counselor, president elect and the president. She completed a two-year fellowship in medical microbiology at the Medical College of Virginia in Richmond, prior to joining the Department of Pediatrics, Division of Infectious Diseases at the State University of New York at Buffalo as an assistant professor and being appointed director of Bacteriology and Serology Laboratories at the Children's Hospital of Buffalo. Her research interest is in the transplacental transmission of Lyme disease and she is the author of many peer-reviewed articles. Altaie received her PhD in Clinical Microbiology and Immunology from the University of North Texas in Denton.
