= Susanne (1961 film) =

1960 film by Elsa Colfach

Susanne is a 1961 Swedish film directed by Elsa Colfach.
