= Susanna =

Susanna or Suzanna may refer to:

== People ==
- Susanna (Book of Daniel), a portion of the Book of Daniel and its protagonist
- Susanna (disciple), a disciple of Jesus
- Susanna (given name), or Suzanna, a feminine given name (including a list of people with the name)

== Film and television ==
- Suzanna (film), a 1923 American silent film
- Susanna (1967 film), a Hong Kong film directed by Ho Meng Hua
- Susanna (2000 film), an Indian Malayalam-language film directed by T. V. Chandran

== Music ==
- Susanna (Stradella), a 1681 oratorio by Alessandro Stradella
- Susanna (Handel), a 1749 oratorio by George Frideric Handel
- "Susanna", English version of "Suzanne" by VOF de Kunst (The Art Company), 1984

== Places ==
- Susanna, Missouri, US

== See also ==
- Susana (disambiguation)
- Susanne (disambiguation)
- Suzanne (disambiguation)
- Suzzanna (1942–2008), Indonesian actress
- Zsuzsanna Fazekas (1861–1929), Hungarian female murderer
