= Susi Graf =

American film director

Susi Graf is an Austrian-American filmmaker, currently living in New York. Attended New York University, Tisch School of the Arts and studied Theater and Journalism at the University of Vienna, Austria. Received two Fulbright Scholarships and numerous grants for her artistic projects and her academic work.

She worked as a television producer interviewing numerous film directors such as Quentin Tarantino, John Waters, Terry Gilliam and many more as well as actors like Demi Moore, Michael Douglas, Bruce Willis, and Mel Gibson.

From 2003 to 2009 she directed and produced the documentary Lost in the Crowd.
