= Suzana =

Suzana may refer to:

- Suzana Al-Salkini (born 1984), Macedonian model
- Suzana Alves (born 1978), Brazilian sex symbol
- Suzana Amaral (1932–2020), Brazilian film director and screenwriter
- Suzana Ćebić (born 1984), female volleyball player from Serbia, playing as a libero
- Suzana Dinić (born 1986), Serbian singer and pianist, the member of the girlband Beauty Queens
- Suzana Ferreira da Silva, Brazilian footballer
- Suzana Jovanović, popular Serbian turbo-folk singer
- Suzana Perović (born 1962), Serbian singer
- Suzana, Senegal, a village in the Bignona Department of Senegal
