= SuS Schalke =

SuS Schalke 1896
- Full name: Verein für Sport-und-Spiel 1896 Schalke
- Founded: 1896
- Website: https://www.schalke96.de/

Spiel-und-Sport Schalke 96 was founded in 1896 and was one of the leading football clubs in Westphalia before the First World War participating in the regional finals for the Western German championship on three occasions. In 1906, they were winless in their preliminary round group against Duisburger SpV, Kölner FC and Viktoria Ratingen. They faced Duisburger again in the quarter-finals in 1908 and lost 10–1. Their last appearance was in 1912 when they beat FC Preussen Munster before going out in a semi-final loss to Essener SV 99.

In 1911, local clubs Ballspielverein Gelchenkirchen and Turner-Club 1874 Gelsenkirchen merged to form a single side. BV made its only playoff appearance in the regional championship the previous year and lost a quarter final match to BV Solingen. SuS in turn joined TCG to create TuS Gelsenkirchen 74/96. In 1924, these two clubs went their separate ways again under their old names.

At the end of the 1930s, SuS club abandoned football to pursue athletics. In 2009, a handball department was formed in co-operation with FC Schalke 04 and played as HSG Schalke 04/96 until 2014.
