= Susanna Dunachie =

Scottish microbiologist and immunologist

Susanna Jane Dunachie
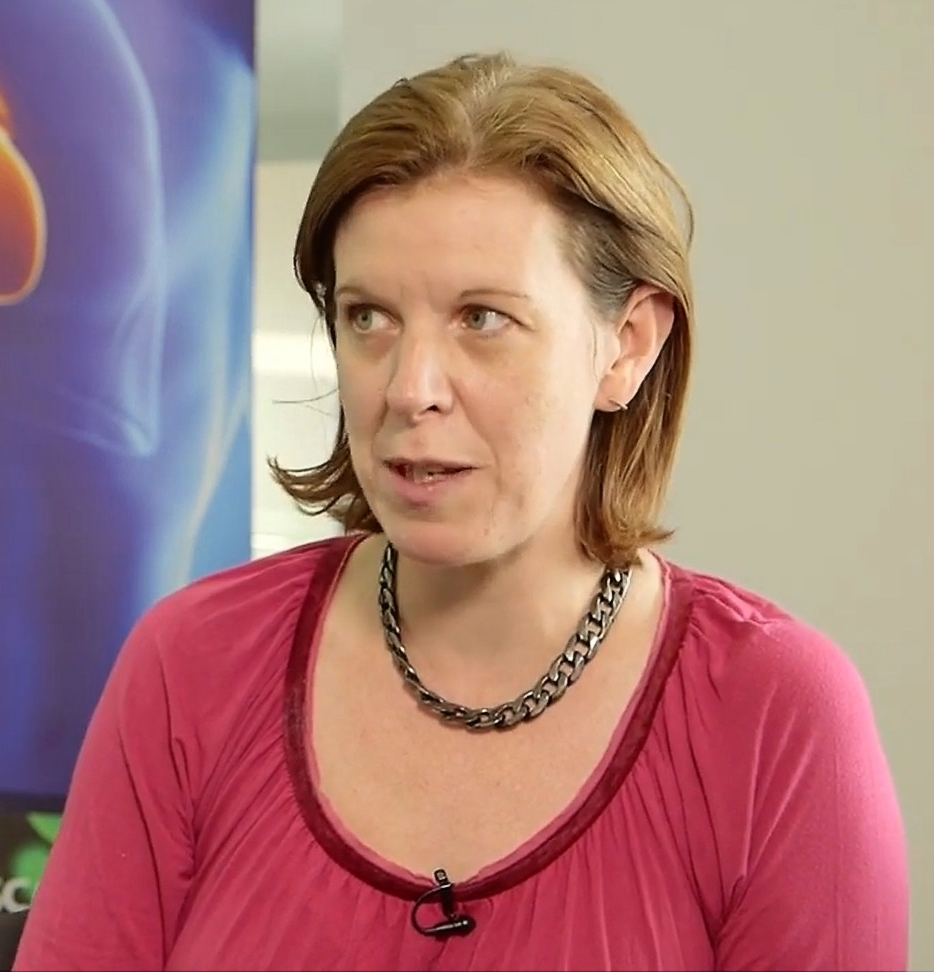
- Dunachie interviewed for Tropical Medicine Oxford in 2015
- Education: Oxford University
- Scientific career
- Fields: Vaccinology
- Workplaces: University of Oxford
- Thesis: Malaria vaccines and microarrays : clinical and laboratory evaluation of two vaccine regimens. (2007)

Susanna Jane Dunachie is a Scottish microbiologist and immunologist who is Professor of Infectious Diseases at the University of Oxford. Her work considers microbiology and immunology to better understand bacterial infection and accelerate the development of vaccines. She has focused on melioidosis, scrub typhus and tuberculosis. During the COVID-19 pandemic, she studied T cell immunity to severe acute respiratory syndrome coronavirus 2.

== Early life and education ==
Dunachie went to school at Bearsden Academy then was an undergraduate student at the University of Oxford, where she studied medicine. After graduating, she worked as a junior doctor in Paisley and Newcastle before returning to Oxford as a clinical research fellow with Adrian V. S. Hill searching for malaria vaccines. She then worked as a specialist registrar in the John Radcliffe Hospital trust.

== Research and career ==
After completing her specialist training, Dunachie moved to Bangkok, where she worked in the Mahidol Oxford Tropical Medicine Research Unit. She returned to the University of Oxford in 2015, where she headed the Tropical Immunology Group. In 2020 she was appointed as Global Research Professor by the National Institute for Health Research (NIHR).

Dunachie works in infectious diseases and vaccines, particularly attempting to improve the immune responses of people suffering from diabetes. She performs research in tropical countries, where she combines microbiology and immunology to accelerate the discovery of vaccines. In particular, Dunachie has worked on melioidosis, scrub typhus, tuberculosis and severe acute respiratory syndrome coronavirus 2.

In response to the COVID-19 pandemic, Dunachie switched her focus to investigating SARS‑CoV‑2, with a specific focus on T cell immunity. At the time it was unclear what role T cells played in immunity to COVID-19. In particular, diabetic patients appeared to be more susceptible to severe disease.

Dunachie leads the Protective Immunity for T cells in Healthcare workers (PITCH) study, which explores immune responses to the COVID-19 vaccines. She has focused on the Oxford–AstraZeneca COVID-19 vaccine and the Pfizer–BioNTech COVID-19 vaccine in the United Kingdom, but also worked with researchers in Vietnam and Bangladesh. She worked with Eleanor Barnes to investigate how immunocompromised patients respond to the vaccinations. Her hope is that the insight she gains from this work will facilitate the design of vaccinations against melioidosis. Dunachie is a Fellow at Corpus Christi College, Oxford.

== Selected publications ==
- Merryn Voysey; Sue Ann Costa Clemens; Shabir A Madhi; et al. (8 December 2020). "Safety and efficacy of the ChAdOx1 nCoV-19 vaccine (AZD1222) against SARS-CoV-2: an interim analysis of four randomised controlled trials in Brazil, South Africa, and the UK". The Lancet. 397 (10269): 99–111. doi:10.1016/s0140-6736(20)32661-1. ISSN 0140-6736. PMC 7723445. PMID 33306989. Wikidata Q104286457.
- Jordan R. Barrett; Sandra Belij-Rammerstorfer; Christina Dold; et al. (17 December 2020). "Phase 1/2 trial of SARS-CoV-2 vaccine ChAdOx1 nCoV-19 with a booster dose induces multifunctional antibody responses". Nature medicine. 27 (2): 279–288. doi:10.1038/s41591-020-01179-4. ISSN 1078-8956. PMID 33335322. Wikidata Q109919407.
- Barbara Kronsteiner; Panjaporn Chaichana; Manutsanun Sumonwiriya; et al. (8 May 2019). "Diabetes alters immune response patterns to acute melioidosis in humans". European Journal of Immunology. 49 (7): 1092–1106. doi:10.1002/eji.201848037. ISSN 0014-2980. PMC 6618312. PMID 31032897. Wikidata Q91591024.
