= Soosan Lolavar =

British-Iranian composer and educator

Soosan Lolavar is a British-Iranian composer and educator. She has composed electronic and acoustic music for the concert hall, contemporary dance, installation, film, animation and theatre.

== Life ==
Soosan Lolavar was born and raised in London. She holds dual British-Iranian citizenship as her father is Iranian. She studied Social and Political Sciences at Cambridge University, Musicology at Oxford University and Composition at Trinity Laban Conservatoire of Music and Dance. In 2015 she was awarded a Fulbright Scholarship to study Iranian music at Carnegie Mellon University in Pittsburgh. She formerly taught Composition at Trinity Laban Conservatoire of Music and Dance and Goldsmiths, University of London. She has a PhD in Music from City, University of London and her research interests centre on ethnomusicology with a particular emphasis on auto-ethnography and the politics of diaspora, hybridity and double-consciousness.

== Works ==
Lolavar works in both electronic and acoustic sound, and across the genres of concert music, contemporary dance, installation, film, animation and theatre. In 2024 Lolavar received an Ivor Novello Award nomination at The Ivors Classical Awards. "Undone" was nominated in the Best Chamber Ensemble Composition category.

=== Opera ===
- ID, Please First performed by Pittsburgh Opera April 2017

=== Theatre, Dance and Film ===
- Between You and Me: Music for the play by Edward Thomasson (2013)
- Dawn: They Too Circled Warily (2013)
- Music for the film One Shot (2014).

=== Orchestral ===
- Aqua Triumphalis (2012)
- Things Come Together (2013)

=== Vocal ===
- Mah Didam First performed by the Hermes Experiment, 2016

=== Chamber & Instrumental ===
- Fulcrum for solo harp (2013)
- Protect Me From What I Want (2015, London Sinfonietta commission)
- Manic (2016) composed for the Carpe Diem Quartet
- Girl (2017)

=== Books & Publications ===
- Embodied Research Through Music Composition and Evocative Life-Writing Routledge, 2023, 112 pages
