= Susana (given name) =

- Gender: Female

Origin
- Meaning: Lotus flower (water lily)

Other names
- Alternative spelling: Susanna, Suzanna
- Related names: Susan, Suzanne

Susana is a feminine given name. Like its variants, which include the names Susanna and Susan, it is derived from Σουσάννα, Sousanna, the Greek form of the Hebrew שושנה, Shoshannah, which could have been derived from the Aramaic language. ܫܘܫܢ, Shoshan means lily in Arabic. سوسن, Susan, is the Persian spelling of this name. The spelling Susanna is used in Sweden, Italy, the Netherlands and Finland, as well as much of the English-speaking world. Zuzana is used in Czech Republic and Slovakia, and the spelling is Zsuzsanna in Hungary. In Polish it is Zuzanna. In addition to its use in English, the spelling Susana is also common in countries such as Spain and Portugal.

== People with the given name ==
=== Authors, poets and writers ===
- Susana Calandrelli (1901–1978), Argentine writer and teacher
- Susana Chavez-Silverman, American writer and professor
- Susana Chávez (1974–2011), Mexican poet and activist
- Susana Medina (born 1966), English-Spanish writer
- Susana Pagano (born 1968), Mexican author

=== Entertainment ===
- Susana Agüero (1944–2012), Argentine ballet dancer
- Susana Duijm (1936–2016), Venezuelan entertainer
- Susana Félix (born 1975), Portuguese entertainer
- Susana Miller, Argentine tango dancer

==== Film and television ====
- Susana Blaustein Muñoz, Argentine film director
- Susana Campos (1934–2004), Argentine actress
- Susana Dosamantes (1948–2022), Mexican actress
- Susana Freyre (born 1929), Argentine actress
- Susana Giménez (born 1944), Argentine actress and host
- Susana González (born 1973), Mexican actress
- Susana Rossberg (1945–2025), Brazilian-born Belgian film editor and director
- Susana Werner (born 1977), Brazilian model and actress
- Susana Downes (born 1993), Australian-Filipino actress, singer and Miss Earth Australia 2019

==== Music ====
- Susana Jamaladinova (born 1983), better known by her stage name Jamala, Ukrainian singer, actress and songwriter. Winner of Eurovision Song Contest 2016
- Susana, Lady Walton (1926–2010), wife of composer Sir William Walton
- Susana Baca (born 1944), Peruvian singer
- Susana – Sanne Boomhouwer (born 1984), Dutch trance music singer who performs under the mononym "Susana"
- Susana Harp (born 1968), Mexican singer
- Susana Rinaldi (born 1935), Argentine tango singer
- Susana Seivane (born 1976), Galician gaita player
- Susana Zabaleta (born 1964), Mexican singer and actress

=== Politics ===
- Susana Camarero (born 1970), Spanish politician
- Susana Chou (born 1941), Chinese politician
- Susana Higuchi (1950–2021), Peruvian politician and engineer
- Susana Malcorra (born 1954), United Nations Under-Secretary-General for Field Support
- Susana Martinez (born 1959), Governor of New Mexico
- Susana Mendoza (born 1972), City Clerk of Chicago
- Susana Vilca, Peruvian congresswoman
- Susana Villarán (born 1949), Peruvian politician

=== Sports ===
- Susana Escobar (born 1987), Mexican swimmer and Olympian
- Susana Feitor (born 1975), Portuguese racewalker
- Susana Peper (born 1946), Argentine swimmer
- Susana Somolinos (born 1977), Spanish judoka
- Susana Torrejón (born 1960), Spanish Olympian sprint canoer

=== Others ===
- Susana Barreiros (born 1981), Venezuelan judge
- Susana Centeno, Puerto Rican nurse and public servant
- Susana Ferrari Billinghurst (1914–1999), Argentine aviator
- Susana López Charretón (born 1957), Mexican virologist
- Susana Beatriz Decibe, Argentine sociologist
- Susana Freydoz (born 1951), Argentine nutritionist, sociologist, and convicted murderer
- Susana Rivera-Mills, Salvadoran sociolinguist and academic administrator
- Susana Serrano-Gazteluurrutia (born 1969), Basque lawyer, legal scholar, professor of law
- Susana Urbina (born 1946), Peruvian-American psychologist

== See also ==
- Susana (disambiguation)
- Shuzianna (Goddess)
- Susanna (given name)
- Susannah (given name)
- Susan
- Susie (disambiguation)
- Suzanne (given name)
- Susanne (given name)
- Sue (name)
