= USS Susanne (SP-832) =

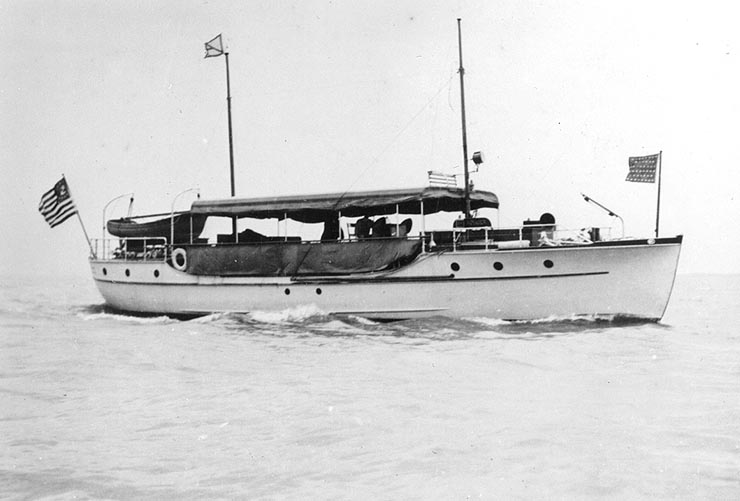
- Susanne in private use sometime before the entry of the United States into World War I in April 1917.

History

United States
- Name: USS Susanne (proposed)
- Namesake: Previous name retained (proposed)
- Builder: Matthews Boat Company, Port Clinton, Ohio
- Acquired: Never
- Commissioned: Never
- Notes: Operated as civilian motorboat Susanne; had no U.S. Navy service

General characteristics
- Type: Patrol vessel (proposed)
- Length: 60 ft (18 m)

USS Susanne (SP-832) was the proposed name and designation for a motorboat that the United States Navy inspected for possible naval service in 1917 but never acquired or commissioned.

Susanne was built as a private motorboat by the Matthews Boat Company at Port Clinton, Ohio. Either just prior to the entry of the United States into World War I in April 1917, or shortly afterwards, she was examined for possible U.S. Navy service and given the section patrol registry number SP-832. The Navy did not appropriate her and she remained in civilian hands.

Susanne should not be confused with two patrol vessels that the U.S. Navy did commission during World War I, USS Susanne (SP-411) (also constructed by Matthews Boat Company) and USS Suzanne (SP-510).
