= Susan T. Sommer =

- Born: Susan Thiemann; January 7, 1935; New York City
- Died: March 4, 2008 (aged 73); New York City
- Occupations: librarian, author
- Years active: 1960-2008

Susan Thiemann Sommer (January 7, 1935 – March 4, 2008) was a music librarian with a 40-year career at the New York Public Library, teacher, editor, and noted music critic for the magazine High Fidelity.

== Life and career ==
Thiemann was born in New York City and grew up in Greenwich, Connecticut. After graduating with a magna Cum laude from Smith College in 1956, she attended Columbia University. Assisted by a grant from the Fulbright Program she spent time studying in Florence, receiving her Master's degree in musicology in 1958. Also from Columbia, she later received a Master of Library Science (1967) and an MPhil (1975).

She joined the staff of the New York Public Library in 1961. Upon the retirement of Sydney Beck in 1969, she succeeded him as the head of the Rare Books and Manuscripts of the Music Division. Her position included being the curator of the Toscanini Memorial Archives, a collection of microfilm copies of significant music manuscripts in other libraries. From 1987 to 1997 she was the head of the Circulating Collections of the New York Public Library for the Performing Arts. She was chief of the Music Division from 1997 to 2001, the latter two years concurrent with being the acting director of the New York Public Library for the Performing Arts from 1999 to 2001. She retired in 2001.

She joined the faculty of Columbia University's School of Library Service in 1969 where she taught music librarianship and performing arts bibliography until the school's demise in 1992, earning a highly regarded reputation.

Beginning in 1960, Sommer contributed reviews to High Fidelity/Musical America. For a while she was editor of Current Musicology, and contributed to Musical Quarterly. From 1975 to 1981 she lectured on opera for the Metropolitan Opera Guild.

Sommer maintained a close and active relationship with the Music Library Association. Her earliest reviews appeared in 1960. She functioned as the book review editor from 1978 to 1982, and as editor from 1982 to 1987. She served as president of the Music Library Association from 1989 to 1991. Despite being in ill health (only a month prior to her death), she attended the annual conference in Newport, Rhode Island to say goodbye to friends.

She was also an active member of the International Association of Music Libraries, serving as editor of its journal, Fontes Artis Musicae from 1993 to 2000.

== Personal ==
She was married to Robert C. Sommer for 38 years. He predeceased her in January 2007. She was survived by her brother Nicholas Thiemann and his family.

== Selected list of writings ==
- with D.W. Krummel and L. Solow: "Qualifications of a Music Librarian," Journal of Education for Librarianship, xv/1 (1974), 53–9
- "Vale atque ave: the Late Pro Musica and the State of Early Music in America Today," Musical Newsletter, v/3 (1975), 15–17
- with R. Koprowski: "The Toscanini Memorial Archives at the New York Public Library," College Music Symposium, xvii/2 (1977), 103–23
- "Qualifications of a Music Research Librarian," Fontes Artis Musicae, xxvi/2 (1979), 95–7
- "Joseph W. Drexel and his Musical Library," Music and Civilization: Essays in Honor of Paul Henry Lang, ed. E. Strainchamps and M.R. Maniates (New York, 1984), 270–78
- "Teaching Collection Development in Context," Fontes Artis Musicae, xxxv/3 (1988), 195–7
- "Three Bibliographic Lacunae," Music Reference Services Quarterly 2 nos. 3/4 (1993), p. 391-95.
- "Knowing the Score: Preserving Collections of Music," Fontes Artis Musicae, xli/3 (1994), 256–60
- numerous reviews for High Fidelity/Musical America
