= Sushi (disambiguation) =

Sushi is a Japanese food made with vinegared rice.

Sushi or su shi may also refer to:

- Su Shi, a Song-era Chinese poet
- Sushi (software), a file viewer for the GNOME Desktop Environment
- Sushi (wrestler), the ring name of professional wrestler Akira Kawabata
- SUSHI (NISO Standard), a protocol for collecting library usage data
- Sushi, a protein domain found on the protein Apolipoprotein H
- Sushi (album), an album by James Ferraro, 2012
- Sushi, an EP by Neuroticfish, 2001
- "Sushi", a song by FKA Twigs on Eusexua Afterglow, 2025
- "Sushi", a song by Merk & Kremont, 2018

== See also ==
- Suchi (disambiguation)
