= Al-Susi =

In Arabic names, nisbah al-Susi or as-Susi denotes a relationship to or from the Sous, Morocco. It may refer to:

- Mohammed al-Mokhtar Soussi (1900–1963), Moroccan scholar, politician and writer; author of al-Maʿsul
- Muhammad al-Rudani al-Susi al-Maliki al-Maghribi (c. 1627–1683), Moroccan polymath
- Muhammad bin al-Hussein as-Sūsī, teacher of Moroccan Maghrebi script
- Ibn as-Susi, named on the Maymūnah Stone
