= Susann =

Susann is a given name and surname, a variant of Susan. Notable persons with that name include:

== Persons with the given name ==
- Susann-Annette Storm (born 1957), German attorney and university chancellor
- Susann B. Winter (fl. 1970s–present), German actress (also credited as Susanne Winter; Susan B Winter)
- Susann Cokal (fl. 1990s–present), US author and academic
- Susann Goksør Bjerkrheim (born 1970), Norwegian athlete in handball
- Susann Götz, German athlete in ice hockey
- Susann Korda, stage name of Spanish dancer, singer, film actress Soledad Miranda (1943–1970)
- Susann McDonald (1935–2025), US musician (harpist)
- Susann Müller (born 1988), German athlete in handball

== Persons with the surname ==
- Jacqueline Susann (1918–1974), US author

== See also ==
- Susan
- Sussan (given name)
- Susanne (given name)
