= USS Susanne (SP-411) =

Patrol vessel of the United States Navy

History

United States
- Name: USS Susanne (1917-1918); USS SP-411 (1918-1919)
- Namesake: Susanne was her previous name retained; SP-411 was her section patrol number
- Builder: Matthews Boat Company, Port Clinton, Ohio
- Completed: 1916
- Acquired: May 1917
- Commissioned: 3 August 1917
- Stricken: 15 November 1919
- Fate: Sold 15 November 1919
- Notes: Operated as private motorboat Susanne 1916-1917

General characteristics
- Type: Patrol vessel
- Tonnage: 26 gross register tons
- Length: 76 ft 6 in (23.32 m)
- Beam: 13 ft (4.0 m)
- Draft: 3 ft 4 in (1.02 m) aft
- Speed: 23 knots
- Complement: 11
- Armament: 1 × 3-pounder gun; 2 × machine guns

USS Susanne (SP-411) was a United States Navy patrol vessel in commission from 1917 to 1919.

Susanne was built as a private motorboat of the same name in 1916 by the Matthews Boat Company at Port Clinton, Ohio. In May 1917, the U.S. Navy acquired her from her owner, T. J. Prindiville of Chicago, Illinois, for use as a section patrol boat during World War I. She was commissioned as USS Susanne (SP-411) on 3 August 1917.

Assigned to the 9th Naval District, Susanne served on patrol duties on the Great Lakes for the remainder of World War I. She was renamed USS SP-411 in 1918.

SP-411 was stricken from the Navy List and sold on 15 November 1919.

Susanne (SP-411) should not be confused with the motorboat Susanne, also constructed by the Matthews Boat Company and inspected for World War I Navy service as USS Susanne (SP-832) but never commissioned, or with the patrol vessel USS Suzanne (SP-510), which was in commission at the same time.
