= Suzy Bofia =

Cameroonian basketball player

Personal information
- Born: 9 November 1984 (age 42) Bafia, Mbam-et-Inoubou, Cameroon
- Listed height: 6 ft 6 in (1.98 m)
- Listed weight: 180 lb (82 kg)

Career information
- High school: College de l'Unite (Yaoundé, Mfoundi, Cameroon); North Shore Technical (Middleton, Massachusetts); Naperville Central (Naperville, Illinois)
- College: Illinois Central (2004–2006); Arizona (2006–2007)
- WNBA draft: 2009: undrafted
- Position: Forward
- Number: 52

Career highlights
- NJCAA Division II champion (2006)

Suzanne Assena Bofia (born 9 November 1984) is a Cameroonian former collegiate basketball player for the Arizona Wildcats.

== Early life ==
Bofia was born in Bafia, Cameroon to Prosper and Bernadette Bofia and is the younger twin sister of Beatrice, who was her teammate at Arizona. She is one of 10 children.

Bofia began her high school basketball career at College de l'Unite in Cameroon. She later played for two years at North Shore Technical High School in Middleton, Massachusetts and two more years at Naperville Central High School in Illinois.

== Collegiate career ==
=== Illinois Central (2004–2006) ===
Bofia played two seasons of junior college basketball at Illinois Central. She averaged 11.3 points and 8.2 rebounds per game. Illinois Central was the national runner-up during her freshman season and won the NJCAA Division II championship in her sophomore campaign. Bofia was named to NJCAA Division II All-Region during both of her junior college seasons. She was also named to the all-tournament team for the NJCAA Division II championship in both seasons. As a sophomore, she averaged 16.7 points and 12.3 rebounds per game in the NJCAA tournament, leading her team to the title.

=== Arizona (2006–2008) ===
Bofia transferred, along with sister Beatrice, to Arizona prior to the 2006–07 season.

As a junior at Arizona, Bofia averaged 4.6 points and 3.5 rebounds in 27 games. Bofia redshirted for the 2007–08 season, because she was pregnant. Following her redshirt season, Bofia decided to leave Arizona.
