= ForGG =

South Korean esports player

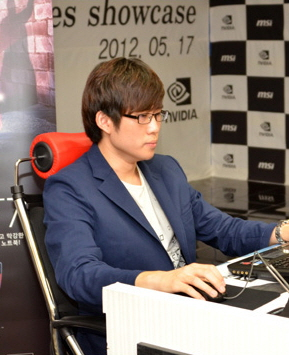

Personal information
- Name: 박지수 (Jisu Park)
- Nickname: Time Attacker
- Born: 1989 or 1990 (age 35–36)
- Nationality: South Korean

Career information
- Games: Starcraft: Brood War; Starcraft II
- Playing career: 2006–2015

Team history
- 2006–2009: Lecaf OZ
- 2009–2010: KT Rolster
- 2011–2012: oGs
- 2012–2015: Millenium

Jisu Park (Korean: 박지수) is a South Korean professional StarCraft: Brood War player and Starcraft II player playing under the name ForGG.

== Career ==
Park joined Korean Team Hwaseung Oz (later Lecaf Oz) in 2006 at the age of 16. In 2008 he won the Arena MSL, defeating two of StarCraft's strongest players, Flash and JaeDong. His very aggressive and precise playstyle earned him the nickname "Time attacker".

In March 2009, Park left Hwaseung OZ to join KT Rolster.

On December 28, 2010, Park announced his retirement from StarCraft: Brood War. He came back to programing in September 2011 as a Terran player for Team oGs in StarCraft II.

He made his debut in Code S in the 2012 GSL Season 1, after securing a spot through Code A.

After the disbandment of oGs he left Korea to join French Team Millenium on June 28, 2012.

His move to France allowed him to play in various European tournaments, the first being ASUS Rog Summer 2012, in which he took 3rd place.

By winning Dreamhack Winter in November 2014, he became the third BroodWar Champion after Jaedong and Flash to win a major tournament in StarCraft II.

On December 4, 2015, following his move back to Korea, Park left Millenium after over three years.
