= Kim Ji-soo (baseball) =

South Korean baseball player

Kiwoom Heroes – No. 13
- Infielder
- Born: August 23, 1986 (age 38); Seoul
- Bats: Right Throws: Right

KBO debut
- May 6, 2009, for the Nexen Heroes

KBO statistics (through July 31, 2019)
- Batting average: .227
- Home runs: 4
- Runs batted in: 34

Teams
- Nexen/Kiwoom Heroes (2009–2010, 2013–present)

Kim Ji-soo (born August 23, 1986) is a Korean minor league baseball player. He played for the Kiwoom Heroes from 2009 to 2010.
