= Sanna (name) =

Sanna or Sanne, the Scandinavian short form of Susanna that in turn is a Greek version of a Hebrew name meaning "lily". It may also be a Sardinian surname.

== Notable people ==
Female

- Sanna Abubkheet (born 1984), Palestinian runner
- Sanna Askelöf (born 1983), Swedish judoka
- Sanna Bråding (born 1980), Swedish actress
- Sanna Ejaz, Pakistani-Pashtun human rights activist
- Sanna Frostevall (born 1979), Swedish footballer
- Sanna Grønlid (born 1959), Norwegian biathlete
- Sanna-June Hyde (born 1976), Finnish-English actress
- Sanna Jalomäki, Finnish-Australian singer, painter and actress
- Sanna Jinnedal (born 1993), Swedish model
- Sanna Kallur (Susanna Kallur, born 1981), Swedish hurdler and sprinter
- Sanna Kämäräinen (born 1986), Finnish discus thrower
- Sanna Kannasto (1878–1968), Finnish-Canadian politician and feminist
- Sanna Kurki-Suonio (born 1966), Finnish singer, kantele player and composer
- Sanna Kyllönen (born 1971), Finnish sprinter
- Sanna Laari (born 1990), Finnish biathlete
- Sanna Lankosaari (born 1978, Finnish ice hockey player
- Sanna Lehtimäki (born 1975), Finnish cyclist
- Sanna Lüdi (born 1986), Swiss skier
- Sanna Lundell (born 1978), Swedish journalist
- Sanna Luostarinen (born 1976), Finnish actress
- Sanna Malaska (born 1983), Finnish footballer and coach
- Sanna Malinen, Finnish professor of psychology in New Zealand
- Sanna Marin (born 1985), the 46th Prime Minister of Finland
- Sanna Magdalena Mörtudóttir (born 1992), Icelandic-Tanzanian politician
- Sanna Nielsen (born 1984), Swedish singer
- Sanna Nymalm, Finnish orienteer
- Sanna Persson (born 1974), Swedish comedian and actress
- Sanna-Kaisa Saari (born 1987), Swedish-Finnish model
- Sanna Sarromaa (born 1979), Finnish sociologist
- Sanna Savolainen, Finnish ski-orienteer
- Sanna Sepponen (born 1977), Finnish actress
- Sanna Sillanpää (born 1968), Finnish murderer
- Sanna Solberg (born 1990), Norwegian handball player
- Sanna Stén (born 1977), Finnish rower
- Sanna Sundqvist (born 1983), Swedish actress
- Sanna Talonen (born 1984), Finnish footballer
- Sanna Valkonen (born 1977), Finnish footballer
- Sanne Vloet (born 1995), Dutch model
- Sanna Visser (born 1984), Dutch volleyball player
- "ISIL wife Sanna" (born 1972), Finnish bride of an Islamic State fighter

Male

- Sanna Nyassi (born 1989), Gambian footballer
- Sanna Pakirappa (born 1958), Indian politician

== See also ==
- Sanna (disambiguation)
- Sanne (disambiguation)
