= Su-ji =

- Hangul: 수지
- RR: Suji
- MR: Suji

Su-ji, also spelled Soo-ji, is a Korean given name.

People with this name include:

- Kang Susie (born 1967), South Korean singer and radio host
- Suji Kwock Kim (born 1969), American poet and playwright of Korean descent
- Suji Park (born 1985), South Korean-born New Zealand ceramic sculptor and artist
- Jang Soo-ji (born 1987), South Korean field hockey player
- Kim Su-ji (volleyball) (born 1987), South Korean volleyball player
- Kim Su-ji (diver) (born 1988), South Korean diver
- Shin Soo-ji (born 1991), South Korean rhythmic gymnast
- Bae Suzy (born 1994), South Korean actress and singer
- Lee Su-ji (born 1998), South Korean actress and singer, member of UNI.T

Fictional characters with this name include:

- Su-ji, in 2010 South Korean film Love, In Between
- Jung Su-ji, in 2011 South Korean film Sunny
- Seong Su-ji, in 2020 South Korean manhwa Pyramid Game and 2024 South Korean tv-adaptation Pyramid Game

== See also ==
- List of Korean given names
