= Susy =

Susy is a feminine given name, sometimes a short form (hypocorism) of Susan, Susanne, Susannah, etc.

Susy may refer to:

== People ==
- Susy Andersen (born 1940), Italian actress
- Susanne Augustesen (b. 1956), Danish footballer
- Susy Avery (born 1947), American politician
- Olivia Susan Susy Clemens (1872-1896), a daughter of Mark Twain
- Susy Delgado (born 1949), Paraguayan poet and writer
- Isabella Susy De Martini (born 1952), Italian politician and academic
- Susy Dorn, Peruvian teacher and musician born Susana Gabriela Rodriguez Santander in 1974
- Susy Frankel, New Zealand law academic
- Susy Kane (born 1978), English actress and writer
- Susannah Susy Pryde (born 1973), New Zealand cyclist
- Susy Schultz, Chicago journalist and social advocate
- Susy Thunder, hacker Susan Headley (born 1959)
- Susi Wirz (b. 1931), Swiss figure skater

== Fictional characters ==
- Susy Hendrix, blind character played by Audrey Hepburn in Wait Until Dark (film)

== See also ==
- Susie (disambiguation)
- Susi (disambiguation)
- Sussy (disambiguation)
- Suzi (disambiguation)
- Suzie (disambiguation)
- Suzy (disambiguation)
