= Susannah (given name) =

- Gender: Female

Origin
- Meaning: Lily

Other names
- Related names: Susanna, Susan, Suzanne, Susana

Susannah is a feminine given name. It is an English version of the Hebrew name Shoshana, meaning lily. Other variants of the name include Susanna, Susana, Susan, Suzanne, and Susie.

Notable people bearing this name include:

- Susannah Breslin, American writer
- Susannah Carr (born 1952), Australian news anchor
- Susannah Carter (fl. 1765), English cookbook author
- Susannah Maria Cibber (1714–1766), English singer and actress
- Susannah Constantine (born 1962), English fashion advisor
- Susannah Corbett (born 1968), English actress and author
- Susannah Darwin (1765–1817), mother of Charles Darwin
- Susannah Doyle (born 1966), English actress, playwright, and film director
- Susannah Fielding (born 1985), English actress
- Susannah Fiennes (born 1961), British artist
- Susannah Fowle (born 1958), Australian actress
- Susannah Sarah Washington Graham (1816–1890), American political hostess
- Susannah Grant (born 1963), American screenwriter and director
- Susannah Gunning (1740–1800), British novelist
- Susannah Hagan (born 1951), English professor
- Susannah Harker (born 1965), English actress
- Susannah Holford (1864–1944), English noblewoman
- Susannah Johnson (born 1990), American gymnast
- Susannah Willard Johnson (c. 1729–1810), American captured in Abenaki raid
- Susannah 'Suzy' Lamplugh (born 1961), British disappearance in 1986
- Susannah Lattin (1848–1868), American woman who died at illegal adoption clinic
- Susannah Martin (1621–1692), woman executed during Salem witch trials
- Susannah McCorkle (1946–2001), American jazz singer
- Susannah Meadows, American writer for Newsweek magazine
- Susannah Melvoin (born 1964), American vocalist, songwriter, and actress
- Susannah Scaroni (born 1991), American wheelchair Paralympian and athlete
- Susannah Sheldon, accuser during Salem witch trials
- Susannah Stacey, pseudonym used by writers Jill Staynes and Margaret Storey
- Susannah Waters, British soprano
- Susannah Wise, English actress
- Susannah York (1939–2011), British actress

== Fictional characters bearing the name Susannah include ==
- Susanna (Book of Daniel)
- Susannah, title character of the opera of the same name
- Susannah, the eponymous character of the Libby Gleeson novel I Am Susannah
- Susannah Dean, character from Stephen King's The Dark Tower series
- Susannah Manatt, character from Honkai Impact 3rd
- Susannah Morrisey, character in the defunct soap opera Brookside
- Susannah, title character of Muriel Denison's novel Susannah of the Mounties
- Susannah, title character in "Susannah's Still Alive", a single by The Kinks
- Susannah Simon, protagonist of The Mediator Series
- Princess Susannah, fictional character in Black Mirror

== See also ==
- Susanna (given name)
- Susana (given name)
- Susan
- Susie (disambiguation)
- Suzanne (given name)
- Susanne (given name)
- Sue (name)
- Zuzana
