= Suzy =

Suzy may refer to:

== Arts and entertainment ==
- Suzy (film), a 1936 film starring Jean Harlow, Franchot Tone and Cary Grant
- "Suzy" (Fool's Garden song), a song by German pop band Fool's Garden
- "Suzy", a song by Kanye West from his 2025 re-release of Donda 2
- "Suzy", a song by French electro swing band Caravan Palace
- Suzy Turquoise Blue, character in The Keys to the Kingdom by Garth Nix
- one of the title characters of Spike and Suzy, a Belgian comics series
- Suzy Sheep, a character from Peppa Pig.

== People ==
- Suzy (given name)
- Bae Suzy or Suzy, stage name of Bae Soo-ji (born 1994), a South Korean singer and member of girl group Miss A
- Aileen Mehle (1918–2016), American newspaper and magazine columnist who wrote under the bylines "Suzy" and "Suzy Knickerbocker"
- Suzy (singer) (born 1980), Portuguese singer
- Suzy (footballer), Brazilian footballer Suzy Bittencourt de Oliveira

== Other uses ==
- Suzy, Aisne, a commune in northern France
- Suzy (record label), a record label in Croatia

== See also ==
- Susie (disambiguation)
- Susi (disambiguation)
- Susy (disambiguation)
- Suzie (disambiguation)
- Suzi (disambiguation)
- Suji (disambiguation)
