= Suzie (disambiguation) =

Suzie is a feminine given name.

Suzie may also refer to:

- "Suzie" (Boy Kill Boy song), 2005
- "Suzie" (John Entwistle song), 1996
- Suzie (film), a 2009 French-Canadian drama film
- Suzie River, Quebec, Canada

== See also ==
- Suzi (disambiguation)
- Suzy (disambiguation)
- Susy (disambiguation)
- Susi (disambiguation)
- Susie (disambiguation)
