= Mission Mattéoli =

Study Mission Origins

The Study Mission on the Spoliation of Jews in France (French: La mission d'étude sur la spoliation des Juifs de France), also known as the Mission Mattéoli (or Mattéoli Mission), was set up in March 1997 by Alain Juppé, then Prime Minister, and chaired by Jean Mattéoli.

The Mattéoli Mission Final Report was published in 2000 and contains information about the dispossession of the Jews during the German occupation of France and proposals concerning compensation and remembrance.

== Creation of the mission ==
The Mattéoli Mission was created by decree on 25 March 1997 by Prime Minister Alain Juppé, who appointed Jean Mattéoli as its chairman. Its mission was:

- Research the fate of confiscated items
- Determine their whereabouts
- Draw up an inventory of seized assets
- Make proposals to the government on the future of these assets

The impetus for the creation was a historic speech by president Jacques Chirac, delivered on 16 July 1995 for the 53rd anniversary of the Vel' d'Hiv Roundup in which President Chirac recognized that the Vichy regime had supported the genocidal Nazi policy of the Final Solution. It was the first time a French president recognized France's responsibility for the murder of French Jews in the Holocaust.

In the days that followed, the press published research by Serge Klarsfeld of the accounts of the liquidator of the Drancy camp, Maurice Kiffer. At the CRIF dinner, Prime Minister Alain Juppé announced that he was going to create a commission to study the plundering of the Jews in France during the Nazi occupation.

The "Mattéoli mission" was set up in 1997 and Jean Mattéoli, former resistance fighter and president of the French Economic and Social Council was named to lead it.

The vice-presidency was entrusted to Professor Ady Steg, doctor, son of a deportee, activist in Jewish organizations, and president of the Alliance Israelite Universelle.

Also belonging to this mission are historians François Furet and Annette Wieviorka, Jean Favier, former director of the Archives of France, Jean Kahn, president of the Israelite Consistory, Serge Klarsfeld, Alain Pierret who had been French Ambassador to Israel, and Caroline Piketty, curator heritage who was seconded as archivist to the Mission.

Due to the scale of the work, Antoine Prost and Claire Andrieu agreed to be part of the study mission following the death of François Furet in 1997.

The findings were released on 17 April 2000.

== Conclusions ==
The report estimated the value of property plundered by the Nazis from Jews in France at 1.35 billion euros (more than 5.2 billion francs at the time), apart from the looting of apartments and works of art by the Germans. Financial theft (insurance policies, bank accounts, and securities, etc.) amounted to 520 million euros.

The "aryanization" of businesses and real estate was assessed at 5.1 million euros.

The sums of money taken by the French authorities from those interned in the camps exceeded 91 million euros. The Mattéoli mission estimated that between 90% and 95% of goods and assets of all kinds had been returned since the end of the war. In addition, of the 100,000 works of art that were looted, 45,000 have been returned to their owners.

== Results ==
Following the first recommendations of the two progress reports of this mission, published in January 1998 and 1999, a Commission for the compensation of victims of spoliations resulting from the antisemitic legislation in force during the Occupation was set up. in September 1999. Chaired by Pierre Drai, the commission has already received nearly 4,500 individual requests. The then Prime Minister, Lionel Jospin, set up a financial compensation mechanism for the orphans of deported Jews from France.

Lionel Jospin also announced, in November 1999, the creation of a Foundation for the Memory of the Shoah which should "aim to develop research and disseminate knowledge of anti-Semitic persecutions (...) as well as of anti-Semitic persecutions (...) victims of these persecutions and of the conditions which in France allowed the great majority of Jews to escape deportation".

It should "support, in particular, the initiatives of non-profit legal persons who provide moral, technical or financial support to those who have suffered from these persecutions, to their families, to those who have helped them or to the Resistance".

This wish for the mission of the Foundation to be extended to the Resistance was moreover underlined by Jean Mattéoli.

The Mattéoli mission also wanted, in the same recommendation, that the object of the Foundation be extended to research on "other genocides or crimes against humanity", the Foundation not therefore having to limit its field of activity during the Holocaust.

Recommendation No. 11 of the general report of the "Mattéoli mission" provides that "the unclaimed funds of any kind resulting from the spoliation must be paid by public and private institutions to the Foundation for Memory".

Professor Ady Steg, vice-president of the "Mattéoli mission" estimated that 1.4 billion francs should, for this purpose, be paid by the State and 1 billion francs by financial institutions.

Regarding financial spoliations, the "Mattéoli mission" underlines that "the fact that mergers, acquisitions and changes of statutes have taken place since the war does not authorize financial establishments, insurance companies to consider themselves as discharged from the responsibilities contracted by companies which they have absorbed or from which they come."

The report recommends that, when the spoliation of a property is established, compensation should be de jure "regardless of the limitation periods in force".

The Prime Minister indicated, on April 19, 2000, that "these proposals obtained from him an agreement in principle and that after an inter-ministerial work, he would announce in the coming weeks the follow-up that the Government intends to reserve for them".

For its part, the French Association of Banks announced that French banks were committed "to applying the recommendations contained in the Mattéoli report and to making a significant financial contribution to the Fondation pour la Mémoire".

== Publications ==
- Guide des recherches dans les archives des spoliations et des restitutions / Mission d'étude sur la spoliation des Juifs de France (PDF). Mission étude spoliation juifs. Paris: La Documentation française. 2000. p. 318..
- Mission d'étude sur la spoliation des Juifs de France - Rapport général by Jean Mattéoli

=== Bibliography ===
- Annette Wieviorka (2012). "Éléments pour une histoire de la Mission Mattéoli" (PDF). La Revue des droits de l'homme (2)..
- Rapport au Premier ministre de la Mission d’étude sur la spoliation des Juifs de France (Report to the Prime Minister of the Working Party on the Spoliation of Jews in France), Jean Mattéoli, 1997
- Rapport général au Premier ministre de la Mission d’étude sur la spoliation des Juifs de France (General Report to the Prime Minister of the Working Party on the Spoliation of Jews in France), 2000
- La Persécution des Juifs de France 1940-1944 et le rétablissement de la légalité républicaine : recueil des textes officiels 1940-1999 (The Persecution of Jews in France 1940-1944 and the Restoration of Republican Legality: collection of official texts 1940–1999). Working Party on the Spoliation of Jews in France, 2000. This report is available on-site at the Centre de documentation France - Europe - Monde
- Le Pillage de l’art en France pendant l’occupation et la situation des 2000 œuvres confiées aux musées nationaux (The Looting of Art in France During the Occupation and the Status of 2,000 Works Entrusted to the National Museums), 2000
- Les Biens des internés des camps de Drancy, Pithiviers et Beaune-la-Rolande (The Property of Internees of the Drancy, Pithiviers and Beaune-la-Rolande Camps), 2000
- Le Pillage des appartements et son indemnisation (The Looting of Apartments and Its Compensation), 2000
- La Spoliation dans les camps de province (Spoliation in Camps in the Provinces), 2000
- Aryanisation économique et restitutions (Economic Aryanisation and Compensation), 2000
- La Sacem et les droits des auteurs et compositeurs juifs sous l’occupation (The SACEM and the Rights of Jewish Authors and Composers under the Occupation), 2000
- La Spoliation financière. Volumes 1 et 2 (Financial Spoliation), 2000
- Guide des recherches dans les archives des spoliations et des restitutions (Guide for Archival Research Concerning Spoliation and Compensation), 2000
- Eléments de réflexion sur l’indemnisation des veuves et orphelins des déportés juifs de France (Elements of Reflection on Compensation for Widows and Orphans of Jews Deported from France) - Rapport de la Mission interministérielle d’étude sur l’indemnisation des victimes de la déportation (Report of the Interministerial Task Force on Compensation for Victims of the Deportation), 2000

== See also ==
- The Holocaust in France
- Vichy France
- Drancy internment camp
- Vel d'Hiv
- The E.R.R. (Reichsleiter Rosenberg Taskforce)
- M-Aktion
- Klaus Barbie
- Kurt von Behr
- Alfred Rosenberg
- History of Jews in France
- Commission de récupération artistique
