= Suzan (given name) =

Suzan is a variant spelling of the feminine given name Susan. Notable people with the name include:

- Peri Suzan Özkum (born 1959), Turkish-American paediatrician and former diver
- Suzan Najm Aldeen (born 1973), Syrian actress
- Suzan Anbeh (born 1970), German actress
- Suzan Ball (1934–1955), American actress
- Suzan Rose Benedict (1873–1942), American academic
- Suzan Berend, South African politician
- Suzan Brittan (born 1967), American actress and vocalist
- Suzan Bushnaq (born 1963), Kuwaiti artist
- Suzan Çevik (born 1977), Turkish Paralympic shooter
- Suzan Crowley (born 1953), Anglo-American actress
- Suzan Daniel (1918–2007), Belgian lesbian activist
- Suzan DelBene (born 1962), American politician
- Suzan Der Kirkour (c. 1959–2019), Armenian rape and murder victim
- Suzan Farmer (1942–2017), English actress
- Suzan Frecon (born 1941), American contemporary artist
- Suzan Hall, Canadian politician
- Suzan Johnson Cook (born 1957), American presidential advisor, pastor, theologian, author, activist, and academic
- Suzan Kahramaner (1913–2006), Turkish mathematician
- Suzan Carson (born 1941), American serial killer
- Suzan Emine Kaube (born 1942), Turkish-German writer, painter and pedagogue
- Suzan Kerunen (born 1979), Ugandan singer and songwriter
- Suzan Lamens (born 1999), Dutch tennis player
- Suzan G. LeVine (born 1969), American diplomat
- Suzan Mweheire Kitariko (born c. 1975), Ugandan businesswoman
- Suzan Novoberdali, Kosovar politician
- Suzan Palumbo, Trinidadian-Canadian writer and editor
- Suzan-Lori Parks (born 1963), American playwright, screenwriter and novelist
- Suzan Pitt (1943–2019), American film animator and painter
- Suzan Pouladian (born 2007), Bulgarian rhythmic gymnast
- Suzan Sabancı (born 1965), Turkish businesswoman
- Suzan Shown Harjo (born 1945), American advocate for American Indian rights
- Suzan Stortelder (born 1992), member of the Dutch musical duo Suzan & Freek
- Suzan van der Lee, Dutch-American seismologist
- Suzan van der Wielen (born 1971), Dutch field hockey player
- Suzan Woodruff, American abstract painter
- Suzan Zengin (1959–2011), Turkish journalist

== See also ==
- Suzan (disambiguation)
- Suzanne
- Souzan
