= Edouard Cukierman =

French-Israeli businessman (born 1965)

- אדוארד קוקיירמן
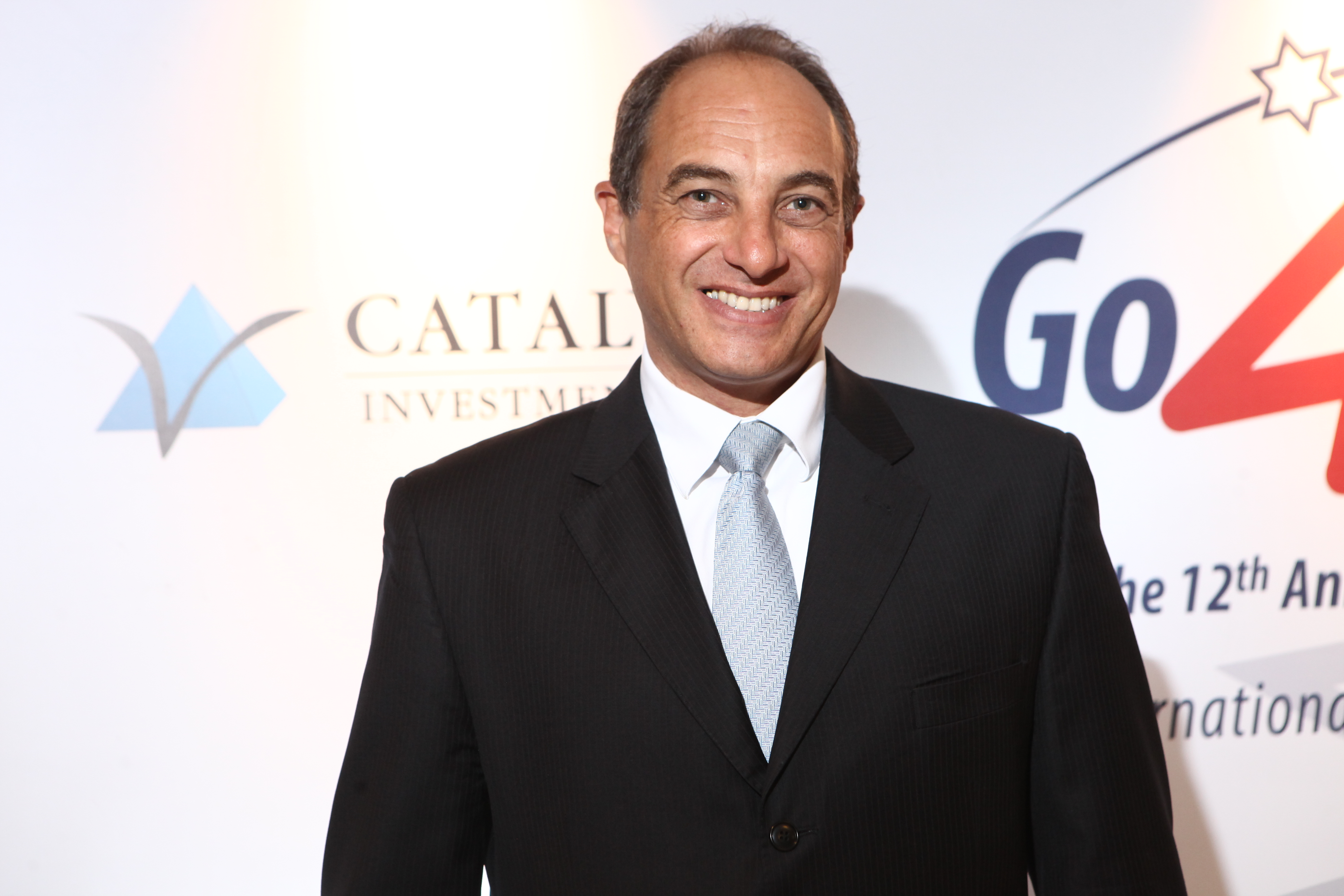
- Born: 13 March 1965 (age 61); Paris, France
- Education: INSEAD, Technion
- Occupations: Businessman and Entrepreneur
- Children: Daniel Cukierman, Michael Cukierman, Ariel Cukierman
- Parent: Roger Cukierman

Édouard Cukierman (Hebrew: אדוארד קוקיירמן; born 1965) is a French-Israeli businessman.

== Early life and education ==
Edouard Cukierman was born in Paris. His father is Roger Cukierman, ninth president of the Conseil Représentatif des Institutions juives de France (CRIF), and Vice President of the World Jewish Congress. He settled in Israel in 1984. He served his military service at Israel Defense Forces as Réservé Officer in the spokesperson unit and in the negotiation unit in crisis and hostage situations. He graduated from the Technion - Israel Institute of Technology, where he received a B.Sc., and received a Master's in Business Administration from INSEAD, in France.

== Business career ==
He is the founder of Catalyst Investments and chairman of Cukierman & Co Investment House. Since its establishment in 1993, Cukierman & Co. has been engaged in more than $11.5 billion of corporate finance transactions. With over 33 years of investment experience and entrepreneurial activity in financial services, Cukierman is the CEO and chairman of Catalyst Investors' Club since its establishment in 2023 and currently serves on the board of Curalife and Omeza. He also served on the boards of Tufin, Orex, Better Online Solutions (B.O.S.), MTI, Dori Media Group, Otorio, Omrix, and many Israeli High-Tech companies.

Before establishing Catalyst, he was the president and CEO of Astra Technological Investments, a Venture Capital Fund established in 1993, which was the first Israeli company to go public in Europe.

Edouard Cukierman is also the founder and managing partner of Catalyst Funds, an Israeli private equity firm established in 1999, with $450 million in assets under management across 4 funds. The firm invests in mature Israeli technology companies and has backed companies including Mobileye. Yair Shamir currently serves as managing partner of Catalyst and was Israel's Minister of Agriculture from 2013 to 2015. Edouard is active in various non-profit organizations. He was board member of Sar-El, Gvahim, Fondation France-Israel and Kol Israel Haverim (Alliance in Israel).

Cukierman is the co-author of the book Israel Valley, originally published in French in 2014, and which has since been translated into Chinese, Italian, Portuguese, and English.

Additionally, he is the founder of the annual GoforIsrael event for over 30 years, one of the most prestigious investment conferences in Israel focusing on leading technologies: Life Sciences (Biotech, Medtech, Pharma) & High Tech (AI, Fintech, Cyber, Defense). The event has been held primarily in Tel Aviv, with editions also taking place in China, Europe and the United Arab Emirates, and its 32nd edition scheduled to be held in Miami, December 14, 2026. Over the years, GoForIsrael has brought together more than 15,500 investors and 2,500 Israeli companies, and has facilitated approximately 19,500 one-on-one meetings between investors and entrepreneurships. The conference serves as a platform for fundraising discussions and the establishment of international business partnerships, and includes the presentation of the GoForIsrael Award.

== Personal life ==
Edouard is a father of three boys, Ariel, Michael and Israeli tennis player Daniel Cukierman. and an uncle for Amos, Avishai, Jessica, Jonathan, Raphael and Jeremie.

== Bibliography ==
The book “Israel Valley” co-written by Edouard Cukierman and Daniel Rouach was published by Pearson in 2013 and re-edited in 2018. Israel Valley is a key resource to better understand the Israeli High-Tech Industry. The authors explain and analyze the Israeli experience and know-how in High-Tech. The book illustrates through examples and stories the historical and cultural backdrop which have contributed to our understanding of the Israeli mindset and the impact of Israel's innovative power. In October 2014, a version translated into Chinese was published, in September 2016, the book was published in Italian, in October 2019 in Portuguese and in May 2025 in English.
