= Murder of Mireille Knoll =

Murder of a French Jewish Holocaust survivor

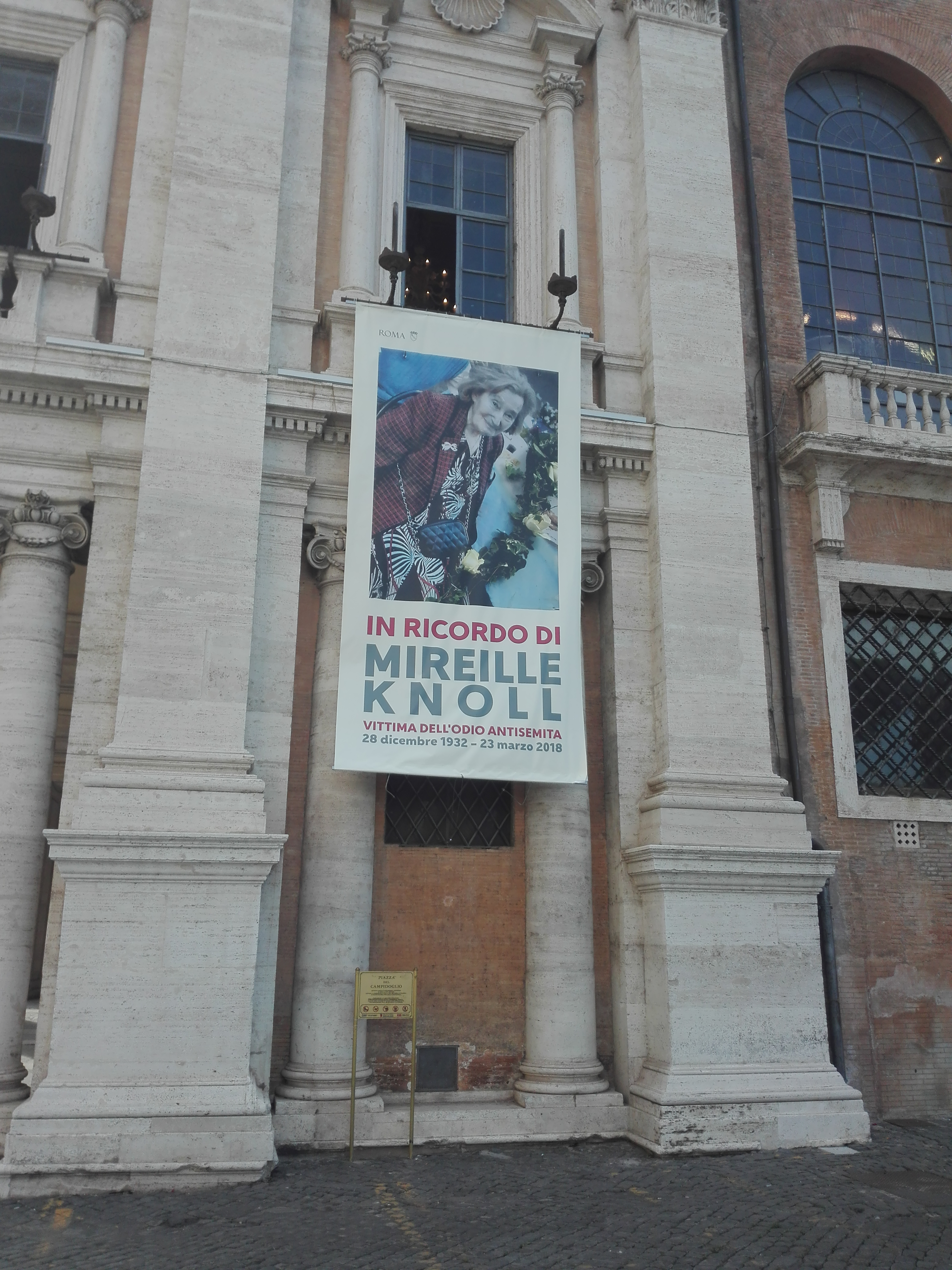
- A banner in Rome commemorating Knoll after her murder
- Date: 23 March 2018
- Location: 11th arrondissement of Paris, France
- Motive: Antisemitism
- Deaths: Mireille Knoll
- Burial: Cimetière parisien de Bagneux
- Suspects: Yacine Mihoub; Alex Carrimbacus

Mireille Knoll (28 December 1932 – 23 March 2018) was an 85-year-old French Jewish woman and Holocaust survivor who was murdered in her Paris apartment on 23 March 2018. The murder has been officially described by French authorities as an antisemitic hate crime.

== Life ==
Early life

Knoll was born on December 22, 1932 in Paris as Mireille Kerbel. Her father Emilio Kerbel (b. 1897) , was from Voznesensk the son of Zalcind and Osma Kerbel, while her mother Sara Finkel (b. 1907) was from Warsaw. Knoll grew up in the neighbourhood of Marais, on the street Rue de Turenne. Knoll's father a traveling wood-craftsman eventually opened a wooden goods factory.

After the occupation of Paris in 1940, Knoll's parents decided to send Knoll and her brother to safety in the countryside. Knoll's father was, however, arrested and sent to the Gurs internment camp.

Knoll, her brother, and her mother fled France in 1942 just before the Vel' d'Hiv roundup of the Jewish inhabitants of Paris. The family then crossed the border into Portugal, her mother having obtained a Brazilian passport on the strength of Knoll's mother having lived in Brazil.

Knoll's father, having been released, joined his family and they settled in Lisbon. A year later they were at a refugee camp in Caldas da Rainha, where they stayed for six months before the American Jewish Joint Distribution Committee aided the family to emigrate to Canada. Boarding the ship Serpa Pinto, they arrived in Philadelphia on the April 6, 1944.

After the liberation, Knoll returned to France. While working in a tailor shop she met a co-worker; Kurt Knoll, Auschwitz survivor whom she married in 1948 . The couple emigrated to Canada, but returned to France in the late 1950s, where the couple had two sons. Knoll's husband supported the family by opening a business, a raincoat workshop in the Jewish district of Sentier.

== Murder ==
There are two alleged assailants, Yacine Mihoub and Alex Carrimbacus. Mihoub was a 29-year-old neighbor of Knoll— who suffered from Parkinson's disease— and had known her since he was a child. Carrimbacus was an unemployed 21-year-old. The two suspects entered the apartment and reportedly stabbed Knoll eleven times, before setting her on fire. The older suspect told investigators that the younger suspect asserted “She’s a Jew. She must have money.” The two suspects accused each other of the stabbing, one of them claiming that the other shouted Allahu akbar as he stabbed her.

== Investigation ==
The Paris prosecutor’s office characterized the 23 March murder as a hate crime, a murder committed because of the “membership, real or supposed, of the victim of a particular religion.” The New York Times noted, "The speed with which the authorities recognized the hate-crime nature of Ms. Knoll’s murder is being seen as a reaction to the anger of France’s Jews at the official response to that earlier crime, which prosecutors took months to characterize as anti-Semitic."

== Arrests and legal proceedings ==
Two suspects were immediately taken into custody; authorities revealed only that one of the suspects was born in 1989. Suspect Yacine Mihoub, a French-Algerian of 28 years, the son of Knoll's neighbour, was previously known to authorities as he had sexually assaulted the daughter of Knoll's assistant, who was 12 years old at the time. Mihoub served a few months in prison and was released in September 2017. Suspect Alex Carrimbacus, 21 years of age, was acquainted with Mihoub in prison.

On 26 October 2021 trial began in Paris, France for Mihoub and Carrimbacus. On 9 November 2021, Mihoub was convicted of murder and sentenced to life imprisonment. Carrimbacus was acquitted of murder but found guilty of theft with antisemitic motives, for which he was sentenced to 15 years in prison.

== Funeral ==
The funeral procession, held on 28 March, drew thousands of mourners who walked solemnly through the streets of Paris. They walked from the Place de la Nation to Knoll's apartment building in the 11th arrondissement. Knoll was buried at the Cimetière parisien de Bagneux. Her grave was visited by Emmanuel Macron, in a private capacity, to support her family in a visit not covered by the media.

== Context ==
According to The Atlantic, this killing marked a shift in the attitude of the French government. In contrast with the similar, antisemitic murders of Ilan Halimi (2006) and Sarah Halimi (2017), French authorities immediately called this killing an act of anti-Jewish hatred.

== See also ==
- Antisemitism in France
- Murder of Sarah Halimi
- Murder of Suzan Der Kirkour
