= Killing of Sarah Halimi =

2017 killing of a Jewish woman in Paris

- Killing of Sarah Halimi (Paris)
- Date: 4 April 2017; 9 years ago
- Time: 5:30
- Location: Belleville, Paris, France; 48.869692°N 2.377290°E
- Deaths: Sarah Halimi
- Suspects: Kobili Traoré

Sarah Halimi was a retired French doctor and schoolteacher who was attacked and killed in her apartment on 4 April 2017. Circumstances surrounding the killing—including the fact that Halimi was Jewish, and that the assailant (Kobili Traoré) had shouted Allahu akbar during the attack and afterward proclaimed "I killed the Shaitan"—cemented the public perception, particularly among the French Jewish community, that it was a stark example of antisemitism in modern France.

For several months the government and some of the media hesitated to label the killing as antisemitic, drawing criticism from public figures such as Bernard-Henri Lévy. The government eventually acknowledged an antisemitic motivation for the killing. The assailant was declared to be not criminally responsible when the judges ruled he was undergoing a psychotic episode due to cannabis consumption, as established by an independent psychiatric analysis. The decision was appealed to the supreme Court of Cassation, who in 2021 upheld the lower court's ruling.

The killing has been compared to the murder of Mireille Knoll in the same arrondissement less than a year later, and to the murder of Ilan Halimi (no relation to Sarah Halimi) eleven years earlier.

== Description ==
Dr Sarah Attal-Halimi, a 65-year-old Jewish woman who was a retired physician and mother of three children, was asleep in her apartment when her 27-year old neighbor Kobili Traoré broke in and beat her with a phone and then his fists, leaving her body with several fractures. He attempted to suffocate her, and then defenestrated her. It is uncertain if she was killed before the fall or if death occurred as a result of the fall. This occurred at her residence, a third-floor apartment in the Belleville district of Paris on 4 April 2017.

Traoré, a drug dealer and drug addict, had previously frightened Halimi with repeated antisemitic insults. After his arrest, he claimed insanity and was promptly held in a psychiatric hospital. An immigrant from Mali, Traoré was reportedly enraged following a family dispute and gained access to the neighbouring apartment of a different family, who immediately locked themselves into a bedroom, phoned police for help, and waited in fear as they listened to the intruder reciting verses from the Quran.

The police are believed to have initially gone to the wrong building while Traoré climbed a balcony from the apartment where the family was sheltering behind a locked door, to the apartment of Halimi, the only Jewish resident of the building. When police finally arrived at the apartment the intruder had entered earlier. The police delayed entering while they awaited the arrival of an elite squad, while more phone calls came in to the police emergency hotline reporting a woman screaming as a man apparently beat her and shouted "shut your mouth", "Allahu Akbar", and "I killed the Shaitan".

After throwing Halimi from a third-floor window, Traoré returned to the first apartment where the family, still cowering in a room and awaiting the police, again heard him praying aloud.

The second district of the judicial police (2nd DPJ) of Paris was responsible for the investigation. On 7 April 2017, prosecutor François Molins, who opened a case for deliberate homicide, declared that the killing could not at that time be considered as an antisemitic act but that this possibility would be explored by the investigators.

The Libération newspaper reported that Traoré had never been confined to a psychiatric hospital before but had been imprisoned several times for offenses including aggravated violence. Toxicological analysis revealed the presence of cannabis in his blood. Having been taken into custody without resistance, Traoré later fought with police and was judged by a doctor to require transfer to a psychiatric hospital. He had not been interrogated by police. The results of the psychiatric assessment were planned for mid-June, then postponed until the end of August.

== Legal proceedings and complaints ==
Halimi's sister-in-law lodged a complaint on 20 June 2017 to denounce the inertia of the police and its lack of coordination.

On 10 July 2017, Kobili Traoré was apprehended and heard by the investigating judge. He recognized the facts about the killing, while denying any antisemitic motivation: "I felt like possessed. I felt oppressed by an external force, a demonic force." He attributes his condition to cannabis consumption.

On 12 July 2017, Traoré was "charged with intentional homicide against Mrs Attal-Halimi and for forcible confinement" of the neighboring family via whose apartment he climbed into Halimi's apartment. He was placed under warrant but remained in hospital. Brigitte Kuster, a member of the 17th arrondissement of Paris, referred the matter to the Minister of the Interior. In September 2017, the prosecutor officially characterized the killing as an "antisemitic" crime.

In February 2018, the investigator in charge admitted in writing the antisemitic nature of the killing as had already been indicated to Agence France-Presse (AFP) by a judicial source.

In July 2019, an examining magistrate ruled that Traoré was likely not criminally responsible because his heavy cannabis use had put him in a state of temporary psychosis known in France as bouffée délirante; this was affirmed at the end of 2019 by the Paris Court of Appeal and in 2021 by the Court of Cassation, which is the final court of appeal in France. Lawyers for Halimi's family subsequently announced their intention to take the case to the European Court of Human Rights.

== Political responses ==
The Times reported on 23 May 2017 that according to Jean-Alexandre Buchinger, an attorney for the victim's family, the killer ought to have been charged with "murder with antisemitism as an aggravating circumstance", and also that French Jewish groups were alleging that this had not been done out of fear of encouraging support for the National Front (France) party's election campaign.

On 16 July 2017, Francis Kalifat, President of the CRIF, emphasized the antisemitic nature of the killing during the commemoration of the Vel' d'Hiv Roundup. The President of the Republic Emmanuel Macron then asked the court to clarify the matter despite the alleged killer's claims.

On 1 June 2017, Belgian MEP in the European Parliament, Frédérique Ries denounced the French authorities' "chilling silence" over Halimi's killing during a debate in the European Parliament on the fight against antisemitism.

In December 2019, President Emmanuel Macron criticized the Paris appeals court's finding that Traoré was unfit for trial, saying "even if, in the end, the judge decided that there was no criminal responsibility, there is a need for a trial"; Macron was rebuked by a judge from the supreme Court of Cassation.

In April 2021, following the decision of the supreme Court of Cassation, President Macron called for the law to be changed. Macron stated that France "does not judge citizens who are sick, we treat them... But deciding to take drugs and then 'going crazy' should not, in my opinion, take away your criminal responsibility".

In January 2022, a 67,000-word parliamentary report on the incident was released. It found that neither the police, psychiatric hospital nor the court system had acted inappropriately. The report was approved by a vote of 7-5, with Meyer Habib, the Jewish lawmaker chosen to lead the committee, among the dissenters. The report was widely condemned by Jewish organizations and media.

== Public reaction ==
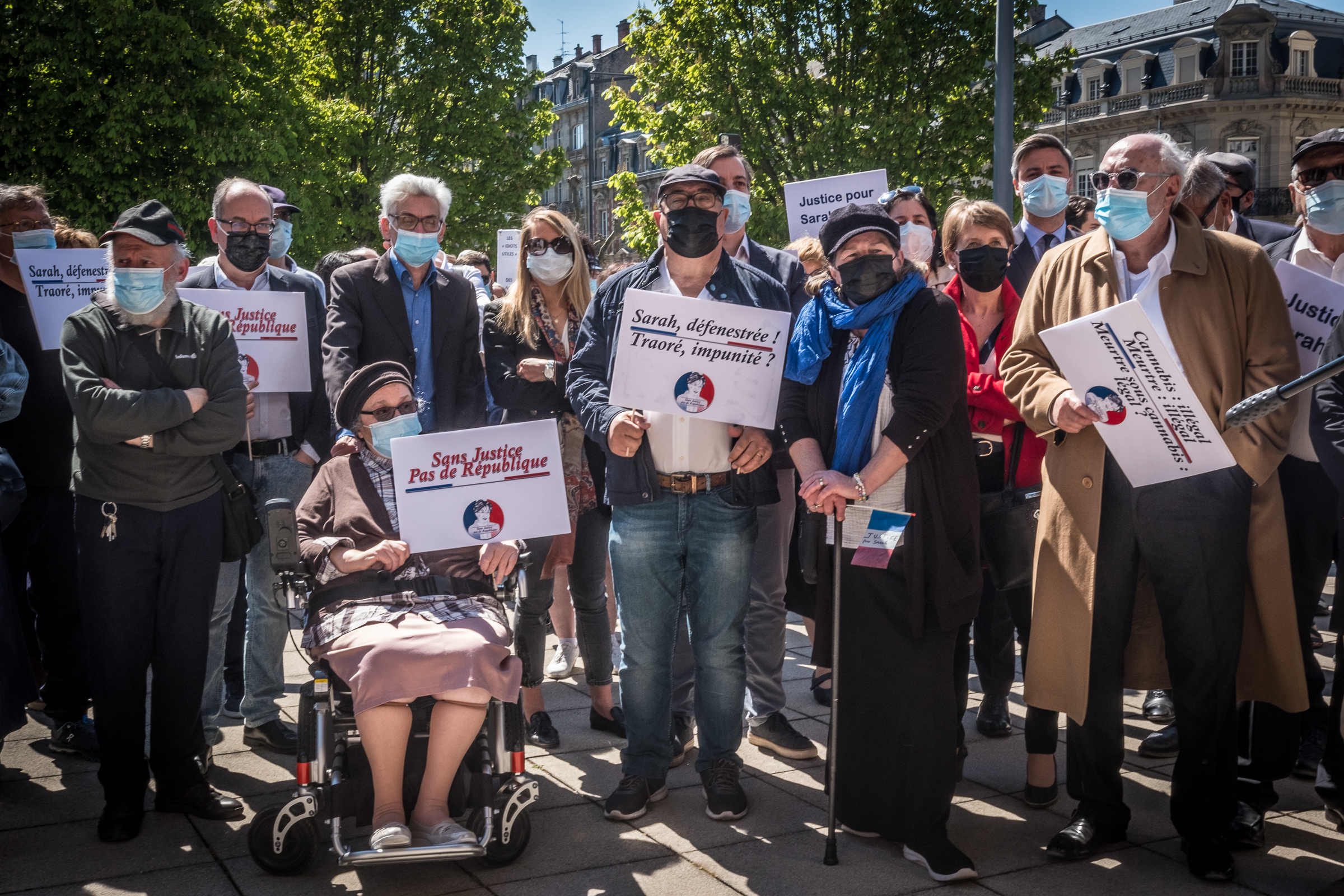
Démonstration for Sarah Halimi in Strasbourg (25 April 2021)

The Halimi killing generated significant public reaction in France and worldwide, with intellectual, media, political and Jewish communal voices demanding that antisemitism and Islamist terrorism be investigated as possible motives, and accusing both the French government and press of a coverup.

On 9 April 2017, between 1,000 and 2,000 people joined a march in memory of Halimi, organized by the Representative Council of the Jewish Institutions of France (CRIF), which asked that "the whole truth" of the case be made public. The march, which also became a protest against antisemitism, started at the local Belleville metro station and ended at the site of Sarah Halimi's homicide.

Paris prosecutor François Molins received representatives of the Jewish community and attempted to reassure them that the issue was not one of antisemitism, but that the possibility was being investigated. According to Gilles-William Goldnadel, a French political commentator and attorney for the Halimi family, Sarah Halimi's killer had "the profile of a radical Islamist, and yet somehow there is a resistance to call a spade a spade."

Alexandra Laignel-Lavastine, a French academic, on 25 May 2017 published an open letter in the newspaper Atlantico titled "From Ilan to Sarah Halimi, France unworthy". She addressed it to Gérard Collomb, appointed Minister of the Interior a week earlier, and denounced France as a "country where it has once again become possible to assassinate Jews without our countrymen being overly disturbed".

Seventeen intellectuals, including Michel Onfray, Élisabeth Badinter, Jacques Julliard, Georges Bensoussan, Alain Finkielkraut and Marcel Gauchet, in the lead article of Le Figaro on 2 June 2017 asked that light be shed "on the death of this French woman of Jewish religion killed at the cries of 'Allah Akbar'". They denounced what they called "the denial of the real" and the fact that "this crime of a rare barbarism", occurring in the middle of a presidential campaign, "received little attention from the media".

On 5 June 2017, Bernard-Henri Levy stressed the fact that, although Sarah Halimi was tortured and defenestrated at the cry of "Allahu Akbar", justice and the press "are reluctant to pronounce the word 'antisemitism'". The same day, the former high magistrate Philippe Bilger evoked the Halimi case in an opinion piece published by Le Figaro. The next day, columnist Gérard Leclerc of Radio Notre-Dame denounced the media silence.

On 8 June 2017, French writer Michel Onfray wondered in a video about the silence surrounding the killing: "How can we kill this poor lady twice? By not giving this information the echo that it deserved, it was to consider that the echo of this murder counted for nothing". He added that "whenever there is an escalation in terror, there is an escalation in the denial of terror. Every real is today evacuated and swept 'if it is likely to play the game of the National Front'. But reality always avenges itself one day".

On 13 July 2017, the CRIF posted a newsletter on the topic noting that the killing had occurred a hundred days before, that the suspect was still under examination for voluntary homicide, and that the aggravating factor of antisemitism had been dropped. "Why this antisemitic denialism?" it asked.

In May 2019, Shimon Samuels of the Simon Wiesenthal Center Europe complained that Traoré was still considered unfit for trial, asserted that the nature of the crime was irrefutably antisemitic, and said that "If justice is perverted and murder excused due to drug addiction, this sets a precedent for every drunk driver to be similarly acquitted."

=== Media coverage ===
The Jewish Telegraphic Agency, The Jewish Chronicle (London), and The Times of Israel carried the story immediately after the killing occurred, flagging it as a possible hate crime.

On 25 May 2017, French journalist Marc Weitzmann published in the American magazine Tablet a long article accusing the French government and press of covering up this and other acts of violent antisemitism.

Le Monde did not publish the story until 23 June, when it finally ran a story raising the question of antisemitism.

Gilles-William Goldnadel, a lawyer for one of the victim's sisters, expressed in the center-right-leaning Le Figaro on 22 May that, "the assassin presents the classic profile of the usual Islamist criminals [...] But what tightens The heart of man and of the lawyer, is called public indifference", highlighting the suspect's judicial past.

The French Jewish press belatedly reported on the matter on 9 June 2017, asserting that based on evidence and witnesses, nothing confirmed an antisemitic character to the crime, expressing confidence in the authorities and urging French Jews not to spread rumors on social media.

Thomas Bidnic, a lawyer for Traoré, stated on 31 May that the suspect, still in psychiatric confinement, might not face trial.

In 2017 The Washington Post revisited Ilan Halimi's murder, describing it as similar to the killing of Sarah Halimi because French authorities similarly refused to acknowledge the antisemitic nature of the killing or to investigate it as ethnically and ideologically motivated terrorism.

== Other ==
Sarah Halimi's son described her as having "studied medicine for seven years, and was a family practitioner." Years later, in the process of raising her children together with her late husband, a psychologist, she decided to apply for an open position as director of a government-funded preschool that "became famous across Paris."

== See also ==
- Murder of Ilan Halimi
- Murder of Mireille Knoll
