= Michel Serfaty =

French rabbi

Michel Serfaty (born 20 January 1943) is a Moroccan-French Rabbi, professor and founder of the organization Jewish-Muslim Friendship of France.

== Biography ==
Serfaty was born on 20 January 1943 in Marrakesh, Morocco. He immigrated from France in the 1960s. Since 1985, he has served as a Rabbi in the community of Ris-Orangis, a southeastern suburb of Paris.

He played in the EuroCup Basketball with the team Alliance au Maroc and played a key role in the team AS Menora with Jean Kahn, former president of the Israelite Central consistory of France and the Jewish Community of Strasbourg. AS Menora was created to help integrate North African Jews with Ashkenazi Jews in Strasbourg. The club was part of the Second Division in 1976. Serfaty also served as captain of the French Maccabi basketball team for over 12 years. He later decided to pursue higher education, going to university and becoming a specialist in Masorah. In addition to his work with Jewish-Muslim Friendship of France, he is also involved with the association DPM (Deportation-Persecution-Memory).

Serfaty is heavily involved in Interfaith dialogue, both locally and nationally. While a professor at Université de Nancy II, he presided over the Consistory's commission on "Relations with Other Religions".

== Jewish Muslim Friendship of France ==
On the evening of 17 October 2003, as he was picking up his son Lior from synagogue, Serfaty was the victim of an antisemitic attack. The assailant and his accomplice were identified and were under investigation. It turned out to be two young men from the Maghreb who lived in a nearby city. Serfaty decided then to begin the project of Jewish-Muslim Friendship of France. A local branch in Paris was created on 19 March 2008. Aboard the Friendship Bus, Rabbi Serfaty, accompanied by Imam Mohamed Azizi, traveled through France connecting Jewish and Muslim communities.

== Bibliography ==
- Le moine, l'imam et le rabbin, co-authored with Benoît Billot et Zuhair Mahmoud, 2002, éd. Calmann-Lévy.
