= Murder of Ilan Halimi =

2006 kidnapping, torture, and murder of a young man in France

Ilan Halimi
- Ilan Halimi
- Born: 11 October 1982; France
- Died: 13 February 2006 (aged 23); Paris, France
- Cause of death: Injuries from torture
- Occupation: Cell phone salesman
- Mother: Ruth Halimi

The murder of Ilan Halimi (Hebrew: אילן חלימי) was the kidnapping, torture, and murder of a young Frenchman of Moroccan Jewish ancestry in France in 2006. Halimi was kidnapped on 21 January 2006 by a group calling themselves the Gang of Barbarians. The kidnappers, believing that all Jewish people are wealthy, repeatedly contacted the victim's modestly placed family demanding very large sums of money. Halimi was held captive and tortured for three weeks, and died of his injuries. The case drew national and international attention as an example of antisemitism in France.

== Kidnapping ==
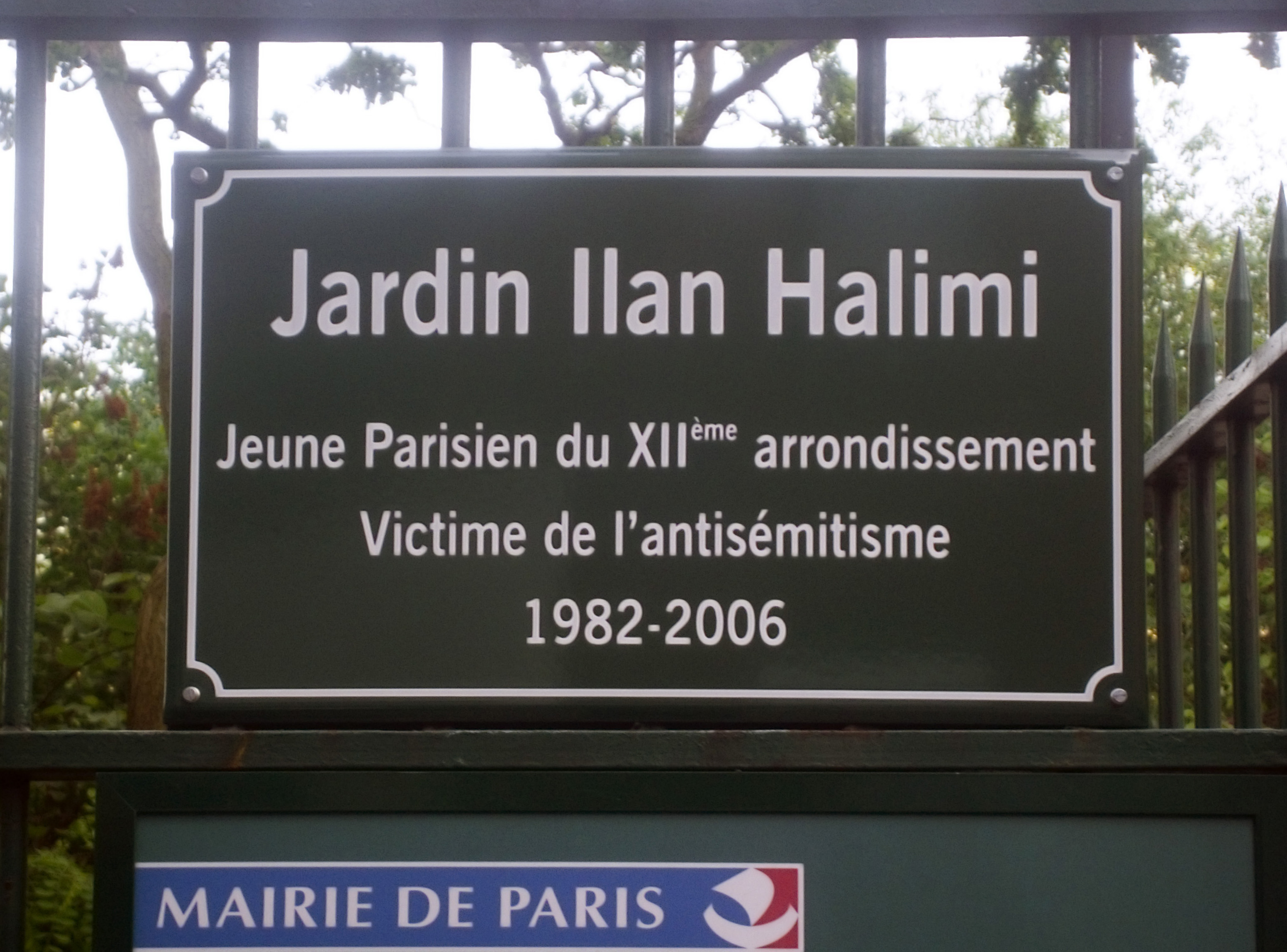
Paris, Jardin Ilan Halimi, Ilan Halimi Garden sign

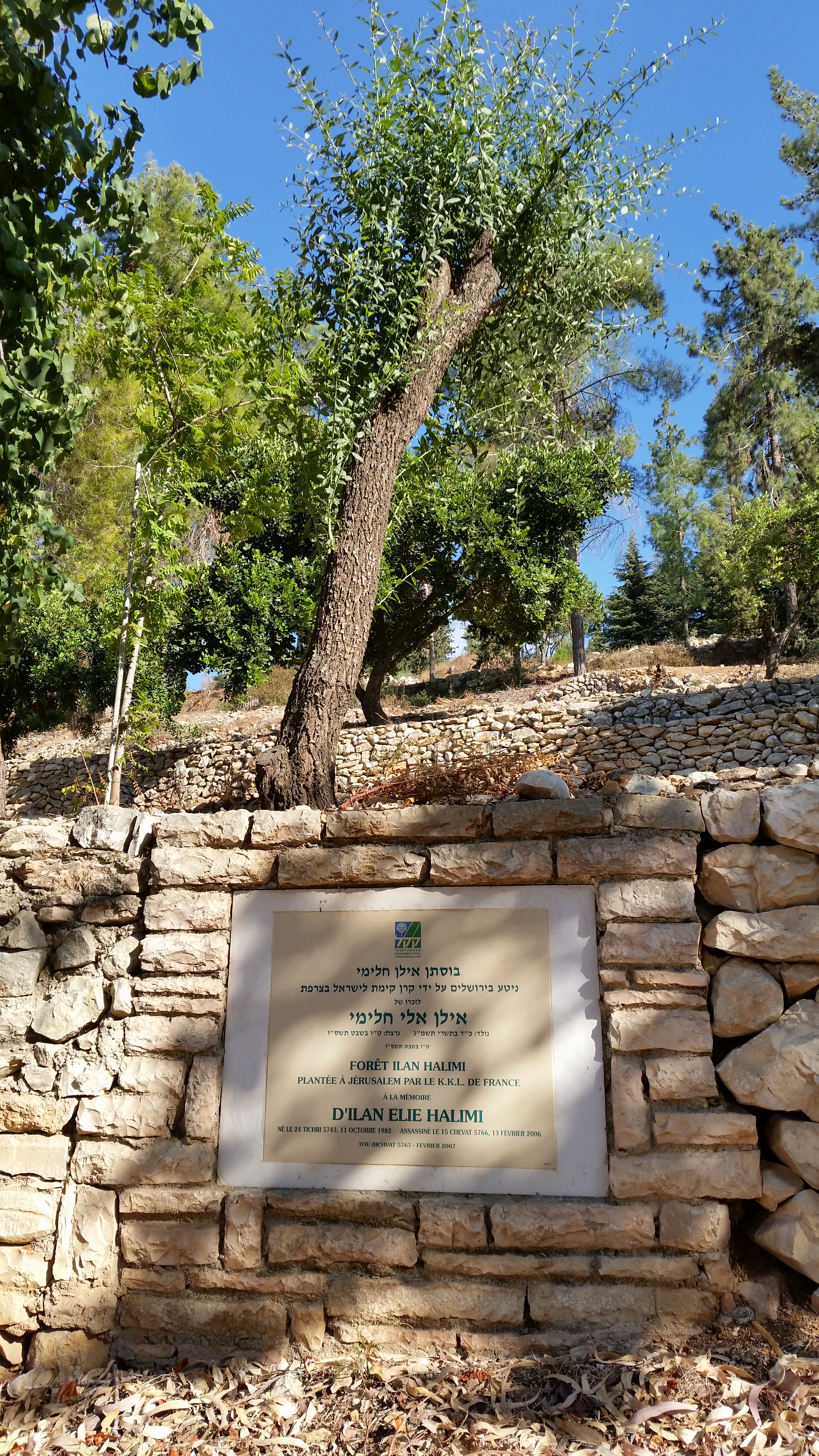
Ilan Halimi garden in the Jerusalem Forest.

Halimi was a mobile phone salesman living in Paris with his divorced mother and his two sisters.

On 20 January 2006, one of the perpetrators, Sorour Arbabzadeh (known as Yalda or Emma), a 17-year-old girl of French-Iranian origin, went to the phone store in Paris where Halimi worked and struck up a conversation with him. She eventually asked for Halimi's number, which he gave to her, and left the store. The woman called him the next evening and told him to come to her apartment for a drink. He was lured to an apartment block in the Parisian banlieues, where he was ambushed and held captive by the group upon arrival. No one saw or heard from Halimi until the next afternoon, when his sister received an email featuring a picture that showed Halimi gagged and tied up to a chair with a gun to his head. In a text, the abductors threatened his life and demanded €450,000 from his family, stating that they would kill him if the family went to the police. Not having the money, however, Halimi's family had no other option than to contact the police.

The abductors, who called themselves the Gang of Barbarians, tortured Halimi and sent phone and video messages to his family while they were in contact with the police. During the 24 days of abduction, the leader of the gang, Youssouf Fofana, managed to travel back and forth to his home country of the Ivory Coast. At some point, he was suspected of being related to the gang, and taken to the police station, but they were forced to release him due to lack of proof of his connection to the group. The demand for ransom, initially elevated at €450,000, diminished as the abductors got more anxious about the attention they were drawing from the police and media.

After three weeks and no success in finding the captors, the family and the police stopped receiving messages from the captors. Halimi, severely tortured, burned, and unclothed, was dumped next to a road at Sainte-Geneviève-des-Bois on 13 February 2006. He was found by a passer-by who immediately called for an ambulance. Halimi died from his injuries on his way to the hospital.

The decision by the police to keep certain matters secret was seen as counter-productive, and may have prevented a facial composite of Sorour Arbabzadeh ("Emma"), the girl who lured Halimi to the apartment. Investigations showed that more than 20 people, some of them teenagers, took part directly or indirectly in the kidnapping. Some of them later claimed that they never knew his fate, and Arbabzadeh (who was 17 at the time), later sent a letter to his family to say how sorry she was.

A woman, referred to as Audrey L., surrendered after the police had released a facial composite picture. She pointed to the Barbarians, a gang of African immigrants who had perpetrated similar abductions in the past. In the subsequent days, French police arrested 15 people in connection with the crime. The leader of the gang, Youssouf Fofana (born 1980), who had been born in Paris to parents from the Ivory Coast, fled to his parents' homeland, together with Arbabzadeh. They were arrested on February 23 in Abidjan and extradited to France on 4 March 2006.

=== Ransom ===
The kidnappers originally thought Halimi was wealthy because he came from a Jewish family. According to the then Interior Minister Nicolas Sarkozy, members of the gang confessed that they believed all Jews to be rich, and this motivated them to target several Jews.

The kidnappers demanded a ransom, initially €450,000, eventually decreasing to €5,000. It has been claimed that the family of Halimi was told that if they could not raise the money, they should get it from the Jewish community.

In order to convince Halimi's parents their son had been kidnapped, the abductors sent a picture of the young man being threatened with a gun and holding a newspaper to prove the date and time.

=== Police investigation ===
The French police were heavily criticised because they initially believed that antisemitism was not a factor in the crime. Police attributed to the banlieues' gang subculture a "poisonous mentality that designates Jews as enemies along with other 'outsiders,'" such as Americans, mainstream French, and Europeans in general. "If they could have gotten their hands on a (non-Jewish) French cop in the same way, they probably would have done the same thing," a retired police chief opined; this may have hampered the original investigation. Antisemitism is an aggravating circumstance (French: circonstance aggravante) in a murder case in France.

Ruth Halimi, Ilan's mother, subsequently co-authored a book with Émilie Frèche titled 24 jours: la vérité sur la mort d'Ilan Halimi (24 days: the truth about the death of Ilan Halimi), released in April 2009. In the book, Ruth claimed that French police never suspected her son's kidnappers would kill the 23-year-old after three weeks in captivity in 2006, partly because they would not face up to the antisemitic character of the crime (as reported in the French newspaper Le Figaro). Émilie Frèche stated that "by denying the anti-semitic character, ... [the police] did not figure out the profile of the gang." The book details how Ilan's parents were told to stay silent during the ordeal and were ordered not to seek aid in order to pay the ransom, nor show their son's photo to people who might have come forward with information about his whereabouts.

In an interview with Elle Magazine on 27 March 2009, Ruth Halimi stated that "The police were completely off the mark. They thought they were dealing with classic bandits, but these people were beyond the norm." Halimi stated that she wrote the book to "alert public opinion to the danger of anti-semitism which has returned in other forms, so that a story like this can never happen again".

== Gang of Barbarians ==
The crime was committed by a group of persons belonging to a gang calling themselves les barbares, 'The Barbarians'. Many of them had criminal records and had been imprisoned. A total of 27 people were accused of involvement in the crime and were tried for kidnapping and murder in 2009. One person was acquitted and the rest were convicted. Gang leader Youssouf Fofana was sentenced to life imprisonment with a minimum of 22 years before the possibility of parole. The woman who had lured Halimi to his abduction was sentenced to nine years imprisonment. Two of his close associates, Jean-Christophe Soumbou and Samir Ait Abdel Malek, received 18 and 15-year prison terms respectively, and Malek's prison term was later increased to 18 years upon appeal. Six others convicted over their involvement received sentences ranging from 12 to 15 years imprisonment, and seven others received sentences ranging from 8 months to 11 years imprisonment. While Fofana chose not to appeal his sentence, 14 of the 27 verdicts were appealed by the prosecution. The convictions were upheld on appeal in December 2010. In 2017, a Paris court sentenced Fofana to an additional 10 years imprisonment for other extortions he had committed.

During the investigation it appeared that key members of the group were probably implicated in at least 15 other cases of kidnapping or racketeering. Posing as members of the National Front for the Liberation of Corsica or members of the French division of the PFLP, they threatened several high-ranking CEOs including Jérôme Clément, president of the European TV operator Arte, Rony Brauman, former president and co-founder of Médecins Sans Frontières, and the CEO as well as another high-ranking member of a large company selling home appliances. They sent threatening pictures of an unknown man dressed as a middle-eastern Arab in front of a picture of Osama bin Laden. In another case, the owner of a large grocery store was directed to pay €100,000.

In total, 27 individuals were under investigation and were subsequently put on trial. Among these:

- Youssouf Fofana (2 August 1980), the self-proclaimed Brain of the Barbarians. He was born in Paris to immigrants from Ivory Coast and served time in prison for various crimes including armed robbery, car theft and resisting arrest. In an interview he denied killing Halimi, but showed no remorse for his actions.
- Christophe Martin-Vallet, nicknamed Moko, a French man originally from Martinique, specializing in computers. He appears to have masterminded the kidnapping and to have been the lieutenant of Fofana. He is suspected of other kidnappings and was responsible for the honeypot activities of the girls.
- Jean-Christophe Soumbou, also known as Craps, Crim or Marc. Fellow inmate of Fofana. Imprisoned for car theft with violence. Supplied the car with which Halimi was transported. He is also suspected of other kidnappings.
- Jean-Christophe Gavarin, usually known as JC or by his nickname Zigo, one of the individuals who tortured Halimi. He was a minor at the time of the crime. He had been expelled from school and had been involved with the law because of a theft and possession of cannabis. He has admitted to pushing a burning joint in the face of Halimi.
- Samir Aït Abdelmalek, nicknamed Smiler, who was the owner of the apartment and is considered the right-hand man of Fofana (he had known Fofana for more than ten years). Had been convicted for possession of drugs and car theft. He also furnished the acid used to burn Halimi.
- Jérémy Pastisson involved in a number of kidnapping cases, his car was used to transport Halimi.
- Tiffenn Gouret, former girlfriend of Jean-Christophe Gavarin and friend of Arbabzadeh, supplied Fofana with "bait". She is also suspected in other kidnappings.
- Sorour Arbabzadeh nicknamed Yalda (also known as "Emma"), a seventeen-year-old French-Iranian girl who acted as appât (bait, honeypot) to entrap Halimi.
- Sabrina Fontaine, was used as bait in other kidnapping cases.
- Audrey Lorleach, nicknamed Léa or Natacha, young student who was used as bait. She turned herself in and served 9 months in prison.

Others who were implicated:

- Gilles Serrurier (1967), nicknamed the concierge, was the caretaker of the apartment building to which Halimi was taken and who lent the gang the apartment and cellar in which they held and tortured Halimi.
- Yahia Touré Kaba, nicknamed Yaks, one of the jailers (gaolers).
- Fabrice Polygone, one of the jailers (gaolers).
- Jérôme Ribeiro, known as Coup de Tête (headbutt). Although he had left the group, he was promised a lot of money. One of the jailers (gaolers).
- Guiri Oussivo N'Gazi and Francis Oussivo N'Gazi, friends of Ribeiro who acted as one of the jailers (gaolers).
- Nabil Moustafa, known as Bilna, pizza delivery man, one of the jailers (gaolers).
- Cédric Birot Saint-Yves, known as Babas, friend of Nabil Moustafa, one of the jailers (gaolers).

Many others were implicated, but their direct connection to the crime could not be proven.

=== 2009 trial ===
The trial, which started on 29 April 2009, was conducted behind closed doors because two of the suspects were minors.

The Halimi family wanted the trial to be conducted openly. Francis Szpiner spoke for Ruth Halimi, saying, "A public trial would have helped [people] better understand the criminal machine, to make parents and teenagers reflect. It's the law of silence that killed her son, it would be unbearable for the trial to remain silent."

The trial took 10 weeks.

==== Incidents during and around the trial ====
- A number of videos with Fofana appeared on YouTube.
- Fofana appeared in court wearing a white T-shirt, smiling, pointing to heaven and saying Allāhu Akbar. He claimed he had nothing to say and would be silent to the grave. When asked his name and date of birth he answered: Je m'appelle arabe, africaine révolte armée barbare salafiste. Je suis né le 13 février 2006 à Sainte-Geneviève-des-Bois. (My name is Arab, armed African rebellion Salafist barbarian army and I was born on 13 February 2006 in Sainte-Geneviève-des-Bois: the date and place Ilan Halimi was found).
- Fofana threw a shoe at the empty benches and again when he was taken down, shouting All the Jews in the world are there [in the empty box], they are my enemies. This is an Arab attack with a booby-trapped shoe!
- Fofana claimed in court that he had friends who would "take pictures to identify people." Francis Szpiner, lawyer for the Halimi family, believed that Fofana was alluding to the jurors, and was implying that he was going to put a price on their heads.

==== Verdict and sentencing ====
On the evening of Friday, 10 July 2009, the verdict was given. Ilan Halimi's mother and others were absent from the court, as the Sabbath had already started.

Of the 27 people on trial, three were acquitted.

| Name | Request | Sentence | Parole | Appeal |
|---|---|---|---|---|
| Fofana, Youssouf | Life | Life | 22 years | No |
| Soumbou, Jean-Christophe | 20 years | 18 years | | Yes |
| Aït-Abdelmalek, Samir | 20 years | 15 years | | Yes |
| Gavarin, Jean-Christophe | 15 years | 15 years | | No |
| Moustafa, Nabil | 13 years | 13 years | | No |
| Birot Saint-Yves, Cédric | 12 years | 11 years | | Yes |
| Polygone, Fabrice | 12 years | 11 years | | Yes |
| Touré Kaba, Yayia | 12 years | 11 years | | Yes |
| Ribeiro, Jérôme | 12 years | 10 years | | Yes |
| Arbabzadeh, Sorour | 10–12 years | 9 years | | Yes |
| Gouret, Tiffenn | 10 years | 9 years | | Yes |
| Serrurier, Gilles | 10 years | 9 years | | Yes |
| Martin-Vallet, Christophe | 8–10 years | 10 years | | No |
| Louise, Franco | 8–10 years | 5 years | | Yes |
| Oussivo N'Gazi, Francis | 6–8 years | 7 years | | No |
| Oussivo N'Gazi, Guiri | 5–7 years | 6 years | | No |
| Pastisson, Jérémy | 5–7 years | 3 years | | Yes |
| Fontaine, Sabrina | 5 years | 3 years | | Yes |
| Lorleach, Audrey | 3 years, 20 months suspended | 2 years, 16 months suspended | | Yes |

A number of others, whose implication was not direct, or related to other activities of the gang, received smaller sentences. Three persons were acquitted. Notable is that one person, for whom originally no sentence was asked, received a suspended sentence.

==== After the trial ====
Sorour Arbabzadeh, the then-17-year-old French-Iranian woman who acted as bait to trap Halimi, was sentenced to nine years imprisonment. While serving her sentence in the Versailles women's prison, she seduced a guard and the director of the prison, Florent Gonçalves, who is now imprisoned himself. For this she was sentenced to four months imprisonment.

=== 2010 retrial ===
The sentences issued after the first trial were criticized as too lenient by some parties, while others such as the attorney general Philippe Bilger found the sentences "exemplary". Minister of Justice Michèle Alliot-Marie, demanded an appeal of 8 of the 17 heaviest verdicts.

Richard Prasquier, president of CRIF, France's main Jewish organization, said that a law may soon be available that would preclude closed-door trials in this type of case. "Perhaps in a year's time there will be a new trial, and perhaps it will be public."

A Halimi relative said: "The important thing for me is not handing out heavier jail terms, honestly. The important thing is to open this to the press and public and make it a learning experience."

The retrial was officially announced Monday 10 July 2009. It started on 25 October 2010, and ended on 17 December 2010, with all convictions upheld and some sentences extended.

=== Similar assault ===
On 22 February 2008, six members of a group calling themselves Barbarians assaulted 19-year-old Mathieu Roumi in the same Paris suburb of Bagneux where Halimi was kidnapped. For two hours the attackers tortured the young man. One shoved cigarette butts into his mouth, another took issue with Roumi's Jewish origin (paternal), grabbed correction fluid and scrawled sale juif ("dirty Jew") and sale PD ("dirty faggot") on his forehead. When the issue of his sexual orientation arose, one of them placed a condom on the tip of a stick and shoved it in Roumi's mouth. The six men proceeded to scream at him and threaten that he would die the way Halimi did. The men were all arrested.

== Public interest and reaction ==
The case was widely reported on both in and outside France, and prompted strong reactions.

=== France ===
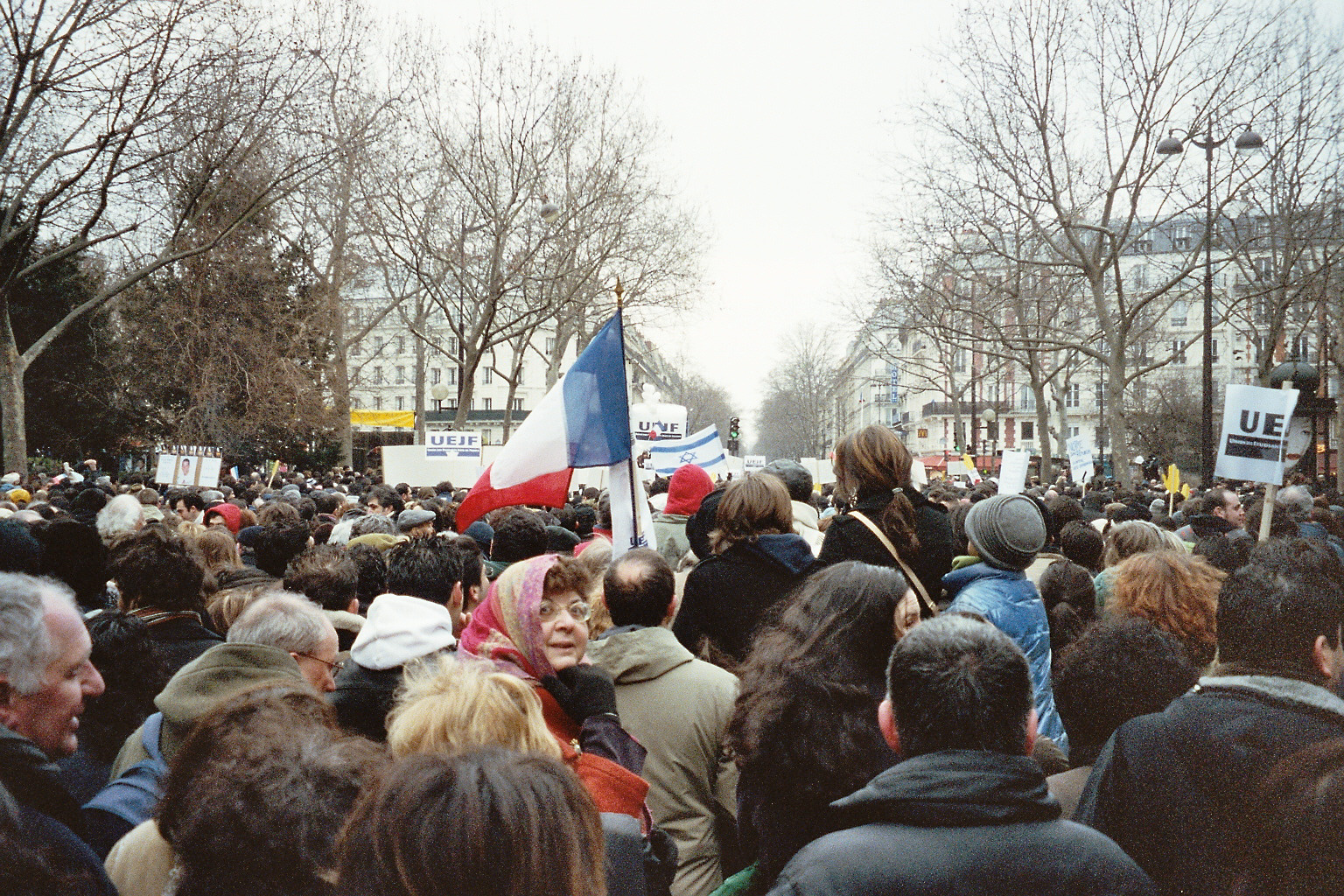
Paris demonstration in honor of Ilan Halimi and against antisemitism In 2006

Then French prime minister, Dominique de Villepin declared that the "odious crime" was antisemitic, and that antisemitism is not acceptable in France.

Six French associations called for a mass demonstration against racism and antisemitism in Paris on Sunday, February 26. Between 33,000 (as estimated by police) and 80,000 to 200,000 (as estimated by the organizers) people participated in Paris, as well as thousands around the country. Present were public figures such as Philippe Douste-Blazy, François Hollande, Lionel Jospin and Nicolas Sarkozy. Also among the participants were Dalil Boubakeur, head of the Paris Mosque and Chairman of the Council of Muslims in France, and Cardinal Jean-Marie Lustiger. Right-wing politician Philippe de Villiers was booed by far-left militants and had to leave under police guard.

Following the murder of Halimi, Jewish spokesman for the French Socialist Party Julien Dray claimed that the murder was the result of a “Dieudonné effect.” The comment was made in reference to French comedian Dieudonné M'bala M'bala, whose rise to fame has been persistently entangled with antisemitic commentary. Dieudonné has faced numerous charges by the French government for incitement of hate. In 2014, a French court ruled that Dieudonné was not responsible for posting and spreading a 2010 video that called for the release of Fofana. The video also expressed condemnation of the “powerful Jewish lobby,” an antisemitic trope that has been center-stage of Dieudonné’s comedy acts. Since Halimi’s murder, Dieudonné has utilized his death in his comedy performances, one of the many factors leading to the comedian’s performances facing bans in France.

=== Outside France ===
On 9 May, the United States Helsinki Commission held a briefing titled "Tools for Combatting Anti-Semitism: Police Training and Holocaust Education" chaired by Commission Co-Chairman Chris Smith (a Republican representative) who said: "[Halimi's] tragedy made brutally clear that Jews are still attacked because they are Jews, and that our work to eradicate all forms of anti-Semitism in all its ugly forms and manifestations is far from done."

== Aftermath ==
=== Burial ===
Ilan Halimi was initially buried in the Cimetière parisien de Pantin near Paris, and the funeral drew a large Jewish crowd. At the request of the family, his remains were reburied in Har HaMenuchot cemetery in Jerusalem on 9 February 2007. It was timed to allow his first Yartzeit, on Tu Bishvat, to pass before the reburial. The date and time (11:30 am) also marked "exactly one year after his burial in France according to the Jewish Calendar."

=== Memorials ===
A garden in the Jerusalem Forest was named after him. In May 2011, a garden in the 12th arrondissement of Paris where Halimi used to play as a child was renamed after him.

A tree commemorating Ilan Halimi was cut down in Sainte-Geneviève-des-Bois shortly before the anniversary of his death in 2019. In 2025, another tree commemorating him was cut down in Épinay-sur-Seine. On the 20th anniversary of his death in 2026, A new tree was planted by French president Emmanuel Macron.

=== Legacy and analysis ===
The kidnapping brought many Jews to speak out against antisemitism and racism, but also stirred discussion about whether Jews could still feel safe in France or not. Emigration to Israel rose as a result.

In 2017 The Washington Post revisited Ilan Halimi's murder, describing it as similar to the murder of Sarah Halimi, because French authorities similarly refused to acknowledge the antisemitic nature of the murder or to investigate it as ethnically and ideologically motivated terrorism.

=== Books ===
A number of books have been written about the case. Among them:

- 24 jours: la vérité sur la mort d'Ilan Halimi; Ruth Halimi and Émily Frèche; Éditions du Seuil; April 2009; ISBN 978-2-02-091028-6. This books was written by his mother, Ruth Halimi, about her experience of the events, together with Émilie Frèche. In late April 2014, a movie by French filmmaker Alexandre Arcady about this case was released. Entitled 24 Jours: La vérité sur l’affaire Ilan Halimi (24 Days: The Truth about the Ilan Halimi Case), it is based on the above-mentioned book.
- Si c'est un Juif : Réflexions sur la mort d'Ilan Halimi ; Adrien Barrot; Editions Michalon; January 2007; ISBN 978-2-84186-364-8
- Ilan Halimi, le canari dans la mine : Comment en est-on arrivé là ?; Yaël König et al; Editions Yago; June 2009; ISBN 978-2-916209-70-8
- Des Barbares Dans la Cité. Reflexions Autour du Meurtre d'Ilan Halimi; David Mascré; Éditions de l'Infini; April 2009; ISBN 978-2-918011-05-7
- A novel, Tout, tout de suite written by Morgan Sportés was inspired by the events and published in 2011. A film version of the novel, starring Marc Ruchmann as Halimi was released in 2015.

== See also ==
- Antisemitism in 21st-century France
- List of kidnappings
- List of solved missing person cases (2000s)
