= Yonathan Arfi =

French business executive (born 1980)

- Born: 14 April 1980 (age 46); Toulouse, France
- Education: HEC Paris
- Occupation: Business executive

Yonathan Arfi (born 14 April 1980) is a French CEO and activist. A member of the Conseil Représentatif des Institutions juives de France (CRIF, "Representative Council of French Jewish Institutions") since 2002, he was elected as vice-president on 4 February 2014, and ran for president in 2022. On 26 June 2022, he succeeded Francis Kalifat as president of the CRIF.

== Biography ==
Yonathan Arfi was born in Toulouse to a Sephardic Jewish family of Algerian and Moroccan descent.

=== Early life ===
Arfi spent his childhood in the Yvelines. He was a member of the Éclaireuses et éclaireurs israélites de France ("Jewish Guides and Scouts of France"), and obtained his degree at HEC Paris.

=== Fight against antisemitism in France ===
From 2003 to 2005, Yonathan Arfi was president of the Union des étudiants juifs de France (UEJF, "Union of French Jewish Students").

He was a member of the CRIF's executive office in 2007, then vice president from 2014 to 2022.

As the leader of the association, he began a protest against Dieudonné.

As the vice-president of the CRIF, he took a public stand against Marine Le Pen, condemning antisemitic graffiti at Paris Nanterre University.

He protested against statements made by Éric Zemmour.

Yonathan Arfi participated in the Alliance Israélite Universelle (AIU, "Universal Israelite Alliance") as a member of the board of directors. He was also a member of the Oeuvre de secours aux enfants (OSE, "Children's Aid Society").

Shortly after his election as president of the CRIF and following a controversy about an Avignon fresco of Jacques Attali, he denounced the worrying rise of antisemitism in France and spoke on the difficulty of being Jewish in current French society during an interview with France Inter.

=== President of the Conseil représentatif des institutions juives de France ===
On 26 June 2022, Yonathan Arfi was elected president of the Conseil Représentatif des Institutions juives de France (CRIF, "Representative Council of French Jewish Institutions") and served a 3-year term.

=== Professional life ===
Yonathan Arfi directs a group of companies active in business consulting.

=== Family ===
He is the younger nephew of French swimmer and Holocaust survivor Alfred Nakache. He has four children.

== Publications ==
- Yonathan Arfi, Paul Bernard, Jean-Yves Camus, Amar Dib, Alain Finkielkraut, Natacha Polony, Yazid Sabeg, Dominique Schnapper, Dominique Sopo, Pierre-André Taguieff, Michel Wieviorka, Les Enfants de la République. Y a-t-il un bon usage des communautés ?, Union des étudiants juifs de France/Éditions de La Martinière, 2004 ISBN 2846751099, 9782846751094

== See also ==
=== Bibliography ===
- Philippe Bourdrel. Histoire des Juifs de France (tome 2) : De la Shoah à nos jours, Éditions Albin Michel, 2014 ISBN 2226290907, 9782226290908 (voir sur books.google.com).
- Zvi Jonathan Kaplan, Nadia Malinovich. The Jews of Modern France: Images and Identities, Éditions Brill, 2016 ISBN 9004324194, 9789004324190.

=== Related articles ===
- Union des étudiants juifs de France
