= Théo Klein =

French lawyer (1920–2020)

President of the Musée d'Art et d'Histoire du Judaïsme
- In office 2001–2011

President of the Conseil Représentatif des Institutions juives de France
- In office 1983–1989
- Preceded by: Jean-Paul Elkann
- Succeeded by: Jean Kahn

Personal details
- Born: Théodore Klein; 25 June 1920 10th arrondissement of Paris, France
- Died: 28 January 2020 (aged 99) Saint-Cloud, France
- Spouse: Liliane Lieber
- Children: 3
- Education: Sciences Po

Théo Klein (25 June 1920 – 28 January 2020) was a French lawyer who presided over the Conseil Représentatif des Institutions juives de France from 1983 to 1989. Klein was a Zionist and a French patriot. He advocated for secular values. He was sometimes critical of Israeli foreign policy and the nation's unconditional supporters.

== Biography ==
Klein was born in Paris, and was the great-grandson of the former chief rabbi of Colmar, Salomon Klein. He was born into an Alsatian Jewish family. He was educated at the École Maïmonide in Montreal. Klein earned a degree in law from Sciences Po.

Klein joined the Eclaireuses et Eclaireurs israélites de France shortly before the Second World War, and then continued practicing with them in Vichy after the war. During the war, he was commissioner for the Marseille and Grenoble sectors.Michel, Alain (1993). Juifs, Français et Scouts : les E.I.F. de 1923 à nos jours (in French). Paris: Université Paris I. From 1942 to 1944, he was one of the leaders of the Jewish resistance in German-occupied Europe, helping produce false documents for Jewish people, and rescuing Jewish children and sending them to Switzerland. He met his wife, Liliane Klein-Lieber during his years of service.

Théo Klein became a lawyer with the Court of Appeal of Paris in 1945 and was admitted to the Israel Bar Association in 1970 as a member of the International Court of Arbitration. In 1978, he founded the law firm Klein & Associates, now called KGA Avocats.

Klein helped reconstruct French Judaism after Liberation by working with many Jewish organizations. From 1945 to 1950, he served as President of the Union des étudiants juifs de France (UEJF), of which he was a co-founder. From 1970 to 1973, Klein was vice-president of the Conseil représentatif des institutions juives de France (CRIF), and was president from 1983 to 1989. He founded the Dîner du CRIF in 1985. He also served on the European Jewish Congress. In 2012, Klein broke his ties with CRIF in a letter to then-President Richard Prasquier, criticizing his response to the Muhammad al-Durrah incident.

In the 1980s, along with Jacques Chirac, Jack Lang, and Claude-Gérard Marcus, Klein was a key figure in the opening of the Musée d'Art et d'Histoire du Judaïsme. He was vice-president of the museum from 1988 to 2001, and then served as president until 2011. He was a large donor to the museum, donating works from the likes of Boris Schatz and Jules Grandjouan.

Klein served as a member of the International Committee of the Auschwitz-Birkenau State Museum. He helped to dissolve the dispute over the Auschwitz cross. After his retired, Klein gave seminars and wrote about the Israeli–Palestinian conflict.

Théo Klein died on 28 January 2020 in Saint-Cloud at the age of 99.

== Honors ==
- Officer of the Legion of Honour

== Publications ==
- Deux vérités en face (1988)
- L'Affaire du Carmel d'Auschwitz (1991)
- Le Manifeste d’un juif libre (2002)
- Une manière d’être juif (2007)
- Sortir du ghetto (2007)
- Israël survivra-t-il (2008)
- Le Conflit israélo-arabe. Quelles sources ? Quelles solutions ? (2010)
