= Suzan =

Suzan may refer to:

== Places ==
- Ousse-Suzan, France
- Sužan, Croatia
- Suzan, France
- Suzan, Iran (disambiguation), several villages in Iran

== Other uses ==
- Suzan (given name), a list of people with the given name
- Mustafa Suzan (born 1957), Turkish wrestler
- The Suzan, a Japanese pop rock band

== See also ==
- Susan (given name)
- Suzanne (disambiguation)
