= Henri Gourarier =

French Holocaust survivor (1928–2021)

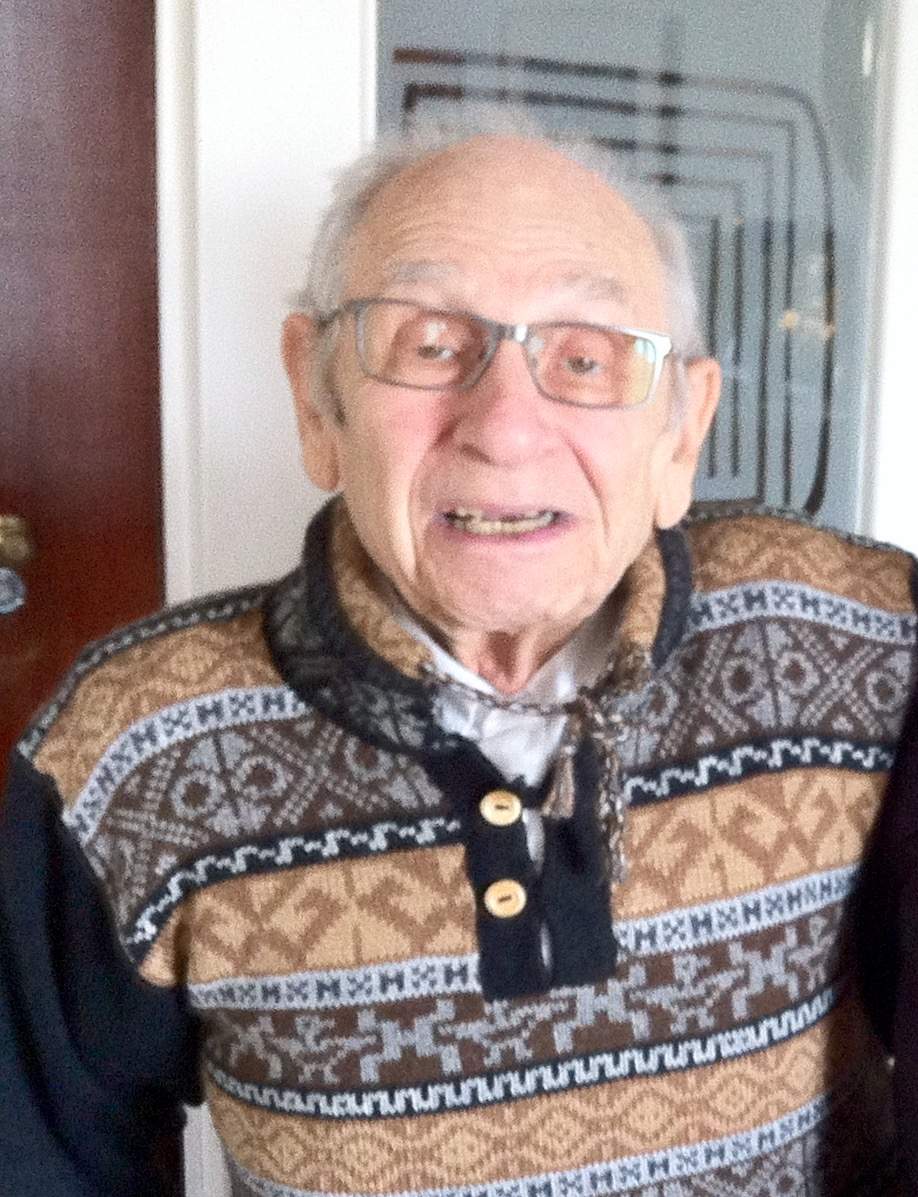
- Hanoch-gourarier
- Born: December 20, 1928; Berlin, Germany
- Died: April 1, 2021 (aged 92)

Henri Gourarier (20 December 1928 – 1 April 2021) was a French Holocaust survivor.

== Early life ==
Gourarier was born in 1928 in Berlin. His father is a native of Łódź in Poland and was employed at Siemens and Halske. His mother was born in Przemyśl, Poland. Henri Gourarier's parents owned a men's clothing store in Berlin.

== Internee ==
Gourarier was deported to a concentration camp in September 1943, and then to Auschwitz. His mother and uncle Oscar were gassed on arrival at Auschwitz on 6 November 1943. Henri was contained in his mother's hometown, Przemyśl, which was turned into a Nazi ghetto. He was finally deported with his family in 1943 to Auschwitz-Birkenau concentration camp with the number 161397 tattooed on his arm (his father had 161396), then to Buchenwald and finally to the plant Spaichingen (Baden-Württemberg). Though exhausted, he managed to escape during a forced march in 1945.

== Career ==
He was repatriated to Nice on 14 July 1945. In 1947, he reached Israel by sea in a small boat as did his future wife: Michelle Gourarier (born 20 February 1928). He passing the Exodus, a ship on which thousands of Jewish survivors of camps vainly tried to reach the Palestine. Henri and Michelle shared a community life at Kibbutz Neve Ilan. On their 2nd anniversary, their child Zeev was born (b. 1953).

In 1955, he returned to France and worked as an engineer till his retirement. He was active in organizations defending human rights. He is a member of the International Federation of Human Rights (FIDH).

Henri Gourarier was knighted in the French Order of Merit on 16 December 1990. He was knighted in the Legion of Honor on 15 April 2016.

== Family ==
Zeev Gourarier (born 1953 in Jerusalem) is the Scientific Director and civilizations of the museum's collections of Europe and Méditerranée. Laurent Gourarier (born 28 April 1961 in Paris) is a psychiatrist specializing in addiction in Paris.

== Sources ==
- SAVED SKIN
- Voir, (en) Henri Gourarier. USC Shoah Foundation Institute testimony of Henri Gourarier. United States Holocaust Memorial Museum.
- « Rencontre avec Michelle Jacoby et Henri Gourarier, passagers de l'Exodus », sur Cercle Bernard Lazare, Grenoble, 15 May 2008
- Nous étions l'Exodus film documentaire de Jean-Michel Vecchiet, 2007
- Jean-Paul Soulié, « Les observateurs ne savent plus où donner de la tête », Montréal, La Presse, 24 August 1990

== Bibliography ==
- Autobiography printed in "Descelle mes lèvres" 2006
- Vidéo Interview for Fondation pour la Mémoire de la Shoah in Paris by Antoine Vitkine, 1997.
- GOURARIER, Hanoch (1 December 2005). Descelle mes lèvres: Zakhor (souviens-toi). Emmanuel GOURARIER. pp. 12–. ISBN 978-2-914945-78-3.
