= Jewish-Muslim Friendship of France =

Non-profit interfaith dialogue organization

- Amitié judéo-musulmane de France
- Founders: Michel Serfaty
- Types: non-profit organization
- Location: Ris-Orangis
- Country: France
- Website: www.ajmf.org

Jewish-Muslim Friendship of France (French: Amitié judéo-musulmane de France (AJMF)) is an organization for interfaith dialogue between Jews and Muslims. Founded in 2004 by French Rabbi Michel Serfaty, it is known for its Jewish-Muslim Friendship Bus which travels across France to create meetings and connections with local partners, neighborhood associations, public authorities as well as local Jewish and Muslim communities. Its slogan is: "We look more alike than it seems."

== History ==
The organization was founded in 2004. It is sponsored by the Conseil Représentatif des Institutions juives de France and the Grande Mosquée de Paris. Its co-presidents are Michel Serfaty and Djelloul Seddiki, director of the Institut Al-Ghazali. In 2005, they debuted their Jewish-Muslim Friendship Bus which travels every year (first through the Île-de-France region, and then through the rest of the country) with Rabbi Serfaty and Imam Mohamed Azizi, a local hospital chaplain.

On March 19, 2008, a local offshoot of the organization was created in Paris. A dozen other local groups have organized, notably in Strasbourg, Besançon, Nice, Montpellier, and Toulouse. These local organizations organize meetings, conferences, film screenings, and open-houses for mosques and synagogues.

In 2012, Mohamed Azizi decided to stop touring but remains with the organization, while Serfaty is accompanied by young Muslim leaders. In 2017, the organization bought a new minibus.
