= Roger Cukierman =

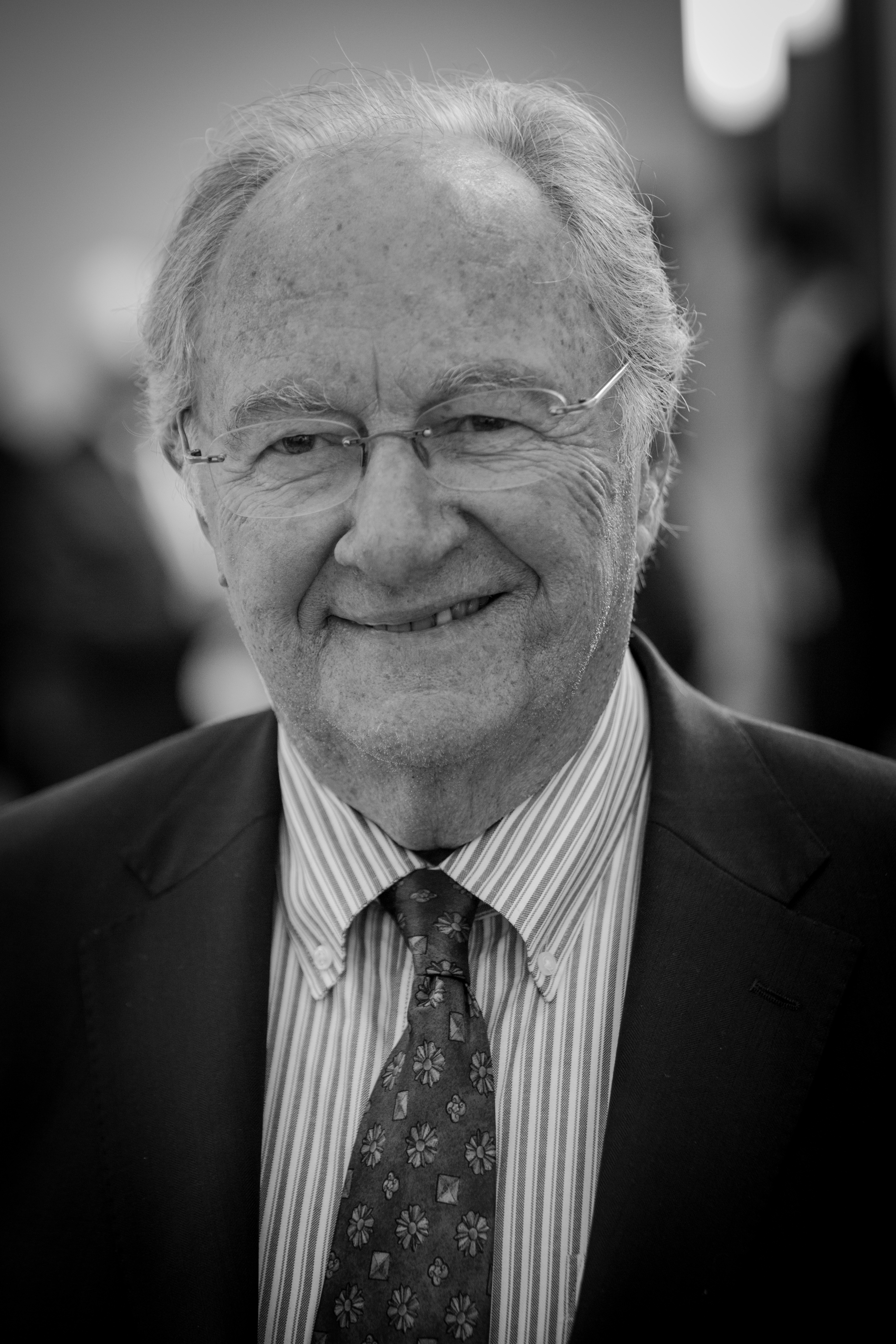
- Roger Cukierman in 2014

President of the CRIF
- In office 2013–2016
- Preceded by: Richard Prasquier
- Succeeded by: Francis Kalifat

Personal details
- Born: 23 August 1936 (age 90) 19th arrondissement of Paris, France
- Spouse: Shoshana Cukierman
- Children: 4, including (Edouard Cukierman)
- Parent(s): Max & Marie Cukierman
- Relatives: Henri Cukierman (brother)
- Education: ESCP Business School
- Profession: Banker

Roger Cukierman (born 23 August 1936) is a French banker, businessman and Jewish philanthropist. He served as the President of the Conseil Représentatif des Institutions juives de France (CRIF) and is Vice President of the World Jewish Congress.

== Biography ==
=== Early life ===
Roger Cukierman was born in 1936. He received a Bachelor of Arts degree in Law and a PhD in Economics from ESCP Europe, a business school in Paris.

=== Business career ===
From 1963 to January 1999, he worked at the Edmond de Rothschild Group. He served as its chief executive officer in France from 1993 to 1999. He also served as the CEO of Israel General Bank and Israel 2000 Mutual Fund. He has served on the boards of directors of Club Med (Euronext: CU), Bolloré, PEC New York, Château Margaux, Publicis, etc. He served as the director of the Association of French Bankers, the defunct Banque Vernes, Credit Suisse Asset Management France, and the Banque privée Edmond de Rothschild (SIX: RLD).

He serves on the board of directors of Cukierman & Co., an investment bank founded by his son, Edouard Cukierman.

He has written two books.

=== Jewish philanthropy ===
He served as President of the CRIF from 2001 to 2007. He was re-elected in May 2013. However, his reelection was criticized by some, who opined he was too old to represent French jewry properly. He has expressed his concern about Qatar's economic ties to France in light of its relationship with the Muslim Brotherhood. He has also said he fears Marine Le Pen, President of the National Front, might win the French presidential election in 2017, as she would seek to "stifle minority views". However, in an interview in February 2015 he claimed that Le Pen "cannot be faulted personally" for anti-Semitism, prompting criticism from Nazi hunter Serge Klarsfeld.

He has also served as Vice President of the European Jewish Congress and the Alliance Israélite Universelle. He currently serves as Vice President of the World Jewish Congress.

== Bibliography ==
- The Capital in the Japanese Economy
- Ni fiers ni dominateurs
