= Isaure Luzet =

French pharmacist and politician (1899–1994)

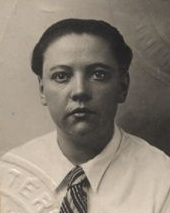
- Born: December 9, 1899; Luxeuil, France
- Died: July 14, 1994 (aged 94); Corenc, France
- Burial place: Saint Roch Cemetery
- Occupations: pharmacist, municipal politician, French resistance fighter
- Awards: Righteous Among the Nations

Isaure Luzet (December 12, 1899 - July 14, 1994) was a pharmacist, French resistance fighter, and municipal politician, whose efforts to protect Jewish children during World War II was recognized in 1988 when she was included in the Righteous Among the Nations by Yad Vashem.

== Early life and education ==
Isaure Luzet was the daughter of a military officer turned distiller, and Mathilde Morin, who was the daughter of a high school teacher in Grenoble. Her father, Armand Luzet, was a veteran of the Franco-Prussian War of 1870 and was an avowed anti-Semite and anti-Dreyfusard. Upon his retirement from the military, he would later relocate his young family to Tunisia where he bought land and hoped to grow agave. When her father died in 1907 or 1908, Isaure returned to Grenoble with her mother, who took up teaching.

As a child, Isaure was a member of neutral section of the Fédération française des éclaireuses (FFE), an interdenominational girl guides organization in France. As per the practice of "totémisation", she was given the title of "Chief Otarie" (Sea Lion) and became a chief scout for the Paris-Luxembourg section of the organization and a member of the FFE's executive. During the Second World War, she was health commissioner within the organization and received leadership training.

Studying pharmacy in Paris, she became one of the first women to receive their pharmacy diploma in France in 1920.

In 1935 she participated in demonstrations against the far-right monarchist Action française movement.

== Work in the French Resistance during World War II ==
At the outbreak of war in 1939, Luzet owned and operated a pharmacy named Le Dragon in Grenoble, living above the shop with her mother. As a member of the Red Cross she was assigned to a station responding to aerial bombardments.

The convent of Notre-Dame-de-Scion was located across from the pharmacy and the sisters who operated the convent and adjacent creche organized a rescue network to spirit Jewish children to safety. The mother superior of the convent, Mother Marie Magda (Marthe Zech), organized a rescue network, while another nun, Sister Joséphine (Denise Paulin-Aguadich), worked with Luzet who prepared false papers and provided transport for Jewish children. Luzet also sheltered fugitives in her home during raids on the convent and when surveillance by the German occupation posed great risk to the nuns. Luzet also used her role as a guide leader to her advantage. In 1943 she travelled to Limoges in uniform to seek out a 10 year old Jewish girl Rita Verda and bring her to the convent in Grenoble. She also worked with La Sixième, a clandestine network of Jewish scouts in southern France, particularly Liliane Klein-Liebere. In August 1942 she sheltered Édith Kremsdorf, a member of the group in her home.

Within the resistance, Isaure was known by the nom de guerre "Claude" and "Le Dragon." She had a reputation for being autocratic and resolute. She ferried food to fighters, buried men who had been killed in the course of operations, and procured false papers and ration cards for resistance fighters. She also served as a member of the Mathilda parachute network of FFC and the Périclès network founded by Robert Lagarde.

Although her official roles as a member of the Red Cross and a Girl Scout allowed her to circulate freely throughout Grenoble to carry out missions, she was not immune from suspicion. Luzet was accused by local militia of falsifying papers and was questioned by police but was released.

== Political career ==
After the war, Luzet was elected as a councilor of Grenoble as a centrist, serving from 1947 to 1959, notably under the term of Mayor Léon Martin. During the 1950s, Luzet was embroiled in the Finaly Affair.

=== Involvement in the Finaly case ===
During the 1950s, Luzet became involved in efforts to shield Antoinette Brun, a director of a municipal crèche who refused to return two Jewish brothers, Robert and Gerald Finaly, to the custody of their immediate family who had survived the Holocaust. Luzet provided Brun with false papers for the two boys and also helped hide them from authorities. She was arrested on March 3, 1953, along with others involved. She was released the next day.

== Death and burial ==
Luzet died July 14, 1994, and was interred in the Saint-Roch Cemetery. Her tomb fell into disrepair and an effort was raised to restore the memorial in 2016. In 2017 a memorial ceremony was held at the site.

== Recognition and awards ==
- Médaille de la Résistenace française, 1947
- Righteous Among the Nations, 1988
