= Ady Steg =

French urologist (1925–2021)

- Born: Adolphe Steg; 27 January 1925; Staré, Czechoslovakia
- Died: 11 April 2021 (aged 96); France
- Occupations: Urologist; Resistant

Adolphe Steg (27 January 1925 – 11 April 2021) was a Czechoslovak-born French urologist and Holocaust survivor.

== Early life ==
Steg was born on 27 January 1925 in Czechoslovakia into a family of Orthodox Jews. His father, Mordechai Steg, born on 19 April 1895 in Bistra, Austria-Hungary, took his family to Paris in 1928. Mordechai had three children with his wife, Feige: Adolphe, Bitia, and Rachel. The family settled in the 12th arrondissement. He went to primary school at the École élémentaire des Hospitalières-Saint-Gervais and secondary school at the Lycée Voltaire.

Steg's father, Mordechai, who had gone by the name of Martin to avoid identification as a Jew, was interned at the Beaune-la-Rolande internment camp. He was then subsequently deported to Auschwitz as part of Convoy No. 5 on 28 June 1942.

Martin survived deportation and later returned to Paris. Adolphe, a student at the Lycée Voltaire, bore a yellow badge as required for Jews living in German-occupied territory. However, his teacher, Mr. Binon, had his class read De la tolérance by Montesquieu. He escaped the Vel' d'Hiv Roundup on 16 July 1942 with false papers, and, thanks to a smuggler, was able to cross the demarcation line into the Zone libre.

He was saved by Alexandre Glasberg and his brother Vila Glasberg, who housed Jewish people fleeing from the Nazis in Cazaubon. He was then sent to Sarlat to continue his education, where he joined the 3rd Battalion of Armagnac of the French Forces of the Interior.

== Medical career and leadership in the Jewish community ==
After World War II, Steg studied medicine with Professor Pierre Aboulker at the Hôpital Cochin in Paris, where he was an Internat des hôpitaux de Paris from 1953 to 1957, when he became Chef de clinique des universités-assistant des hôpitaux. He succeeded Aboulker as head of the urology department at the hospital, holding the role from 1976 to 1990.

He was elected President of the French Society for Urology in 1986, served as President of the French Association of Urology from 1987 to 1989, and was Secretary General of the European Association of Urology from 1984 to 1992. He became a member of the Académie nationale de chirurgie in 1981 and joined the Académie Nationale de Médecine on 24 October 2000. He operated on President François Mitterrand's prostate cancer from 1992 to 1994.

In addition to his medical career, Steg served numerous responsibilities in the Jewish community. He was President of the Paris section of the Union des étudiants juifs de France ("Union of French Jewish students") and vice-president of the World Union of Jewish Students. He was a member of the board of directors of the Fonds social juif unifié, President of the Conseil Représentatif des Institutions juives de France from 1970 to 1974, and President of the Alliance Israélite Universelle from 1985 to 2011.

While at the Alliance Israélite Universelle, Steg oversaw renovations to the school library renovations, the creation of a new College of Jewish Studies, and a growing network between Israel and France. He became Honorary President once his term was finished in 2011. He served on the honorary committee of the Fondation France-Israël and was a member of the board of directors of the Fondation pour la Mémoire de la Shoah. Additionally, he was vice-president of the Mission d'étude sur la spoliation des Juifs de France.

Other functions held by Steg include membership on France's Economic, Social and Environmental Council from 1979 to 1983 and again from 1995 to 2010, membership on the Commission nationale consultative des droits de l'homme starting in 2002, and membership on the Collège de la Haute autorité from 2007 to 2011.

== Personal life ==
Steg was married to Gilberte Nissim, a gynecologist and former member of the French Resistance. They had two sons: Jean-Michel, who became Senior Advisor of the bank Greenhill & Co. in the United States, and Philippe Gabriel, who works as a cardiologist at the Bichat–Claude Bernard Hospital.

His sister, Bitia (1926–2020), lived in Jerusalem. His other sister, Rachel (1923–2009) lived in Haifa. His elder brother, Henri (1922–2016), lived in Paris and was an active member of the French Resistance and the International League Against Racism and Anti-Semitism.

Adolphe Steg died on 12 April 2021 at the age of 96.

== Distinctions ==
- Grand Officer of the Legion of Honour (2000)
- Grand Cross of the Ordre national du Mérite (2006)
- Doctor honoris causa of the Hebrew University of Jerusalem (2001)
