= Souzan =

Souzan (Arabic: سوزان, romanized: Sūzān) is an alternative form of the feminine given name Susan, often a transcription of its Arabic-language rendition. Notable people with the name include:

- Souzan Barakat (1998–2011), German-Yazidi filicide victim
- Souzan El-Eid, Lebanese-American breast surgical oncologist
- Souzan Fatayer (born 1965), Palestinian-Italian translator, academic and activist

== See also ==
- Sousan
- Suzan (given name)
