= Suzan, Iran =

Suzan or Soozan (Persian: سوزن) may refer to:

- Suzan, Hamadan
- Suzan, Kerman
- Suzan, Lorestan
- Suzan, Markazi
