= Tufin =

Software company

- Type: Private
- Industry: Network Security
- Founded: 2005; 21 years ago
- Founders: Ruvi Kitov; Reuven Harrison
- Headquarters: Boston, MA
- Key people: Raymond Brancato (CEO)
- Products: Tufin Orchestration Suite: SecureTrack, SecureChange, SecureApp, SecureCloud, Tufin Cloud
- Owner: Turn/River Capital; (2022–present)
- Number of employees: 533 (in 2020)
- Website: www.tufin.com

Tufin is a network security policy management company founded in 2005. The company has operations in the United States and internationally. In August 2022, it was acquired by U.S. based private equity firm Turn/River Capital for approximately US$570 million and after which the company went private.

Tufin specializes in the automation of security policy changes across hybrid platforms and security and compliance. The Tufin Orchestration Suite supports next-generation firewalls, network-layer firewalls, routers, network switches, load balancers, web proxies, private and public cloud platforms and micro-services.

== History ==
The company was founded in 2005 by Ruvi Kitov and Rueven Harrison and went public on the New York Stock Exchange in April 2019.

In 2018, Tufin leased 4,200 square meters of office space at the ToHa office building in Tel Aviv. At the time, the company had about 200 employees across offices in Boston, London and Ramat Gan.

On April 6, 2022, Tufin announced it had entered into a definitive agreement to be acquired by software-focused investment firm Turn/River Capital. The agreement valued the company at $570 million and was an all-cash deal. Following the sale's close, Tufin reverted to a private company.

In February 2024, Tufin acquired Brisbane-based network monitoring software company AKIPS for an undisclosed amount.

In February 2025, Tufin appointed Raymond Brancato as its chief executive officer.

In February 2025, following the shutdown of Skybox Security, Tufin acquired selected intellectual property, trademarks and customer information from the company, and introduced an Express Path migration program for former Skybox customers.

== Products ==
Tufin develops and markets the Tufin Orchestration Suite which consists of:

- SecureTrack: Firewall Operations Management, Auditing and Compliance
- SecureChange: Security Change Automation
- SecureApp: Application Connectivity Management
- SecureCloud: Hybrid Cloud Security

The company releases updates to Tufin Orchestration Suite each quarter.

The Suite is designed for large enterprises, managed security service providers (MSSP) and IT security auditors. Tufin products help security teams implement and maintain their security policy on all of their firewalls, routers and network switches. They accelerate service delivery through network change automation and expedite compliance audit processes for security standards such as PCI DSS, NERC and Sarbanes–Oxley. Tufin products also help companies to manage and automate the daily configuration changes to network security devices.

== Innovation ==
Tufin's innovation includes several technologies, such as the Automatic Policy Generator which refines security rules based on network traffic, methods for automating security policy management and the concept of managing network security policies from an application scope.

== Partnerships ==
Tufin technology partners include Check Point, Cisco, Fortinet, Juniper Networks, McAfee, Palo Alto Networks, Stonesoft, F5 Networks, VMware, Zscaler, Amazon Web Services (AWS), Microsoft Azure, BMC, ServiceNow, Puppet Labs and others.
