= Jean Mattéoli =

French politician

Jean Mattéoli (December 20, 1922 in Montchanin, Saône-et-Loire – January 27, 2008 in Paris) was a French politician. He was the Minister of Social Affairs during the Raymond Barre administration from 1979 to 1981 and also served as president of the French Economic and Social Council from April 1987 to September 1999.

== Biography (Timeline) ==
Mattéoli was involved in the French Resistance starting in August 1940. He was a part of two networks: the Bureau des opérations aériennes (Office of Air Operations) and the Alliance network. He was arrested by the Germans on 7 April 1944 and was deported to the Neuengamme concentration camp, then Bergen-Belsen. After the war, he received three commendations, including two Order of the Army commendations and the Citation à l'ordre du Régiment.

In 1945, he represented the French provisional government in Burgundy and Franche-Comté. The following year, he was appointed head of economic and financial issues for the administrator of the French-occupied zone of Germany, Emile Laffon. He later accompanied a group of nationalized coal mining enterprises in northern France when he took office as president of Houillères du bassin du Nord et du Pas-de-Calais.

In October 1968, for his extensive knowledge of the terrain, the French government appointed him commissioner for industrialization of the Nord-Pas-de-Calais, and chairman for industrialization of the Ardennes. In 1973, he was additionally appointed by the government as president of Charbonnages de France.

In 1974, as a member of the Economic and Social Council, he was elected president of the section on economic problems and general trends.

Following the death of his predecessor Robert Boulin, he joined the French government in November 1979 as the Minister of Labour.

In 1983 he was elected Councilor of Paris, Deputy Mayor, and Regional Councilor. He left local government when he was elected president of the Economic and Social Council in April 1987, succeeding Gabriel Ventejol. He was re-elected to this post on 10 October 1989, 10 March 1992, 28 September 1994, and the 25 March 1997.

He was President of the Fédération nationale des déportés et internés résistants et patriotes (National Federation of Deportees and Resistance and Patriot Internees) (FNDIR) from 1987 to 1993. In 1993, he helped establish the Fondation de la Résistance, of which he was president.

In June 1993, Prime Minister Édouard Balladur asked him to chair a commission of experts on structural obstacles to employment. He recruited Patrick Devedjian, Philippe Vasseur, Michel Godet, Didier Pineau-Valencienne, Claude Bébéar and Alain Minc. Their September 1994 report suggested lower pay for low-skilled jobs and proposed the Contrat d'insertion professionnelle (CIP).

In December 1995, Prime Minister Alain Juppé appointed him ombudsman in a dispute with the SNCF.

On 9 May 1996, the President of France appointed him to the administrative council of the Ordre National de la Legion d'Honneur.

In February 1997, the prime minister appointed him to study the acquisition in 1940 to 1944 of property belonging to Jews in France through fraud or violence by Nazis and Vichy France authorities.

Mattéoli was raised to the honor of Grand'Croix of the Legion of Honour in 1998. He was the holder of the Croix de Guerre and the Resistance Medal.

He was unanimously elected Honorary President of the French Economic and Social Council on 28 September 1999.
