= Suzan-e Olya =

Suzan-e Olya سوزن عليا
- Village
- Location within Iran
- Coordinates: 29°24′36″N 56°37′12″E
- Country: Iran
- Province: Kerman
- County: Baft
- Bakhsh: Central
- Rural District: Kiskan

Population (2006)
  - Total: 35
- Time zone: UTC+3:30 (IRST)
  - Summer (DST): UTC+4:30 (IRDT)

Suzan-e Olya (Persian: سوزن عليا, also Romanized as Sūzan-e ‘Olyā; also known as Sūzan) is a village in Kiskan Rural District, in the Central District of Baft County, Kerman Province, Iran. At the 2006 census, its population was 35, in 13 families.
