= Suzan Mweheire Kitariko =

Ugandan businesswoman and corporate executive

- Born: 1975 (age 50–51); Uganda
- Education: Makerere University (Bachelor of Mass Communication; Heriot-Watt University (Master of Business Administration)
- Occupations: Businesswoman, corporate executive
- Years active: Since 2000
- Title: General manager at SICPA Uganda Limited

Suzan Mweheire Kitariko (born c. 1975) is a Ugandan businesswoman and corporate executive, who is the general manager of SICPA Uganda Limited, a subsidiary of the Swiss conglomerate SICPA. She has been at her current job since February 2019 and is based in Kampala, Uganda's capital city. Before that, she served as the country manager for Uganda at Google Inc., also based in Kampala.

== Background and education ==
Kitariko is a Ugandan national born in the 1970s. She attended local primary and secondary schools, before being admitted to Makerere University, Uganda's largest and oldest public university. She graduated with a Bachelor of Mass Communication. Later, she was awarded a Master of Business Administration degree from Heriot-Watt University, in Edinburgh, Scotland, United Kingdom.

== Career ==
In 2000, she was the head of sales and customer service at Uganda Telecom (UTL), at the time the mobile component, Mango, was being integrated with the fixed portion of UTL. She served there for seven years.

She spent the five years between 2010 and 2015 at Orange Uganda, serving in various roles, including Head of Operations and Customer Service, acting Chief Commercial Officer, and Head of Strategy.

She was then hired by Google Inc., working for one year as the Operations Manager of their subsidiary in Uganda and for the next five years as the country manager of the Google unit in the country.

She joined SICPA Uganda in February 2019, as the country head.

== Other considerations ==
Effective November 2021, Kitariko sits on the board of Next Media Solutions Uganda Limited, as a non-executive director. The company owns and operates three television stations, and owns and publishes about six online publications.
