= Suzan van der Lee =

Dutch-American seismologist and geophysicist

- Born: Netherlands
- Education: Princeton University (Ph.D.); Utrecht University (M.S.)
- Known for: Seismic tomography Mantle structure research Earthquake studies Seismic education initiatives
- Awards: American Academy of Arts and Sciences Fellow (2024); American Geophysical Union Fellow (2024)
- Scientific career
- Fields: Seismology, Geophysics, Planetary science
- Workplaces: Northwestern University; ETH Zurich; Carnegie Institution for Science
- Doctoral advisor: Guust Nolet
- Website: www.earth.northwestern.edu/our-people/faculty/van-der-lee-suzan.html

Suzan van der Lee is a Dutch-American seismologist and the Sarah Rebecca Roland Professor of Earth and Planetary Sciences at Northwestern University. Her research focuses on seismic imaging of Earth's interior structure, particularly the mantle beneath continents and rift zones. She is known for leading major seismic array projects and developing educational programs in seismology.

== Education and career ==
Van der Lee earned her degree in Geophysics from Utrecht University and completed her Ph.D. at Princeton University in 1996 under Guust Nolet.

Her academic positions include:

- Postdoctoral Fellow at the Carnegie Institution for Science
- Researcher at ETH Zurich
- Professor at Northwestern University since 2003, named Sarah Rebecca Roland Professor in 2022

== Research ==
Van der Lee's research combines seismic data analysis with computational methods to study Earth's interior structure. She has led several major seismic array projects:

- SPREE (2010-2013): An 82-station array across north-central USA and Canada
- DRIAR: A project studying the East African Rift

== Awards and honors ==
- Elected to the American Academy of Arts and Sciences (2024)
- Fellow of the American Geophysical Union (2024)
- President-elect of the Seismology Section, American Geophysical Union
- Board member of Incorporated Research Institutions for Seismology (IRIS)

== Public engagement ==
Van der Lee is active in science communication:

- Featured in media outlets including BBC and WTTW
- Developer of educational programs
