= Suzanne =

Suzanne may refer to:

== People ==
- Suzanne (given name), a feminine given name (including a list of people with the name)
- S. U. Zanne, pen name of August Vandekerkhove (1838–1923), Belgian writer and inventor
- Suzanne, pen name of Renée Méndez Capote (1901–1989), Cuban writer
- Suzanne (television personality) (born 1986), Japanese variety tarento, actress, and singer
- Suzanne Lynch (born 1951), New Zealand singer who performed as "Suzanne"

== Places ==
- Suzanne, Ardennes, France, a commune
- Suzanne, Somme, France, a commune

== Film and television ==
- Suzanne (1932 film), a French film
- Suzanne (1980 film), a Canadian film
- Suzanne (2013 film), a French film
- Suzanne, Suzanne, a 1982 documentary film
- "Suzanne", an episode of Bel Ami

== Music ==
- "Suzanne" (Leonard Cohen song), a 1966 poem and 1967 song, recorded by numerous singers
- "Suzanne" (Creeper song), 2016
- "Suzanne" (VOF de Kunst song), 1983
- "Suzanne" (Weezer song), 1994
- "Suzanne" (Mark Ronson and Raye song), 2025
- "Suzanne" a song from Raised on Radio by Journey
- "Suzanne", a song from 12 Songs by Randy Newman
- "Suzanne", a song from Blue Room by Unwritten Law
- "Suzanne", a song on the self-titled album Lisa Stansfield
- Suzanne (album), a 2015 album by Kim Sa-wol

== Computer graphics ==
- Suzanne (3D model), a primitive of a chimpanzee for the 3D-modeling application "Blender"

== Ships ==
- USS Suzanne (SP-510), a United States Navy patrol vessel in commission from 1917 to 1918

== See also ==
- Susan
- Susanne (disambiguation)
- Suzan (disambiguation)
- Suzie Q (disambiguation)
- Suzette
