= Liliane Klein-Lieber =

French resistance member (1924–2020)

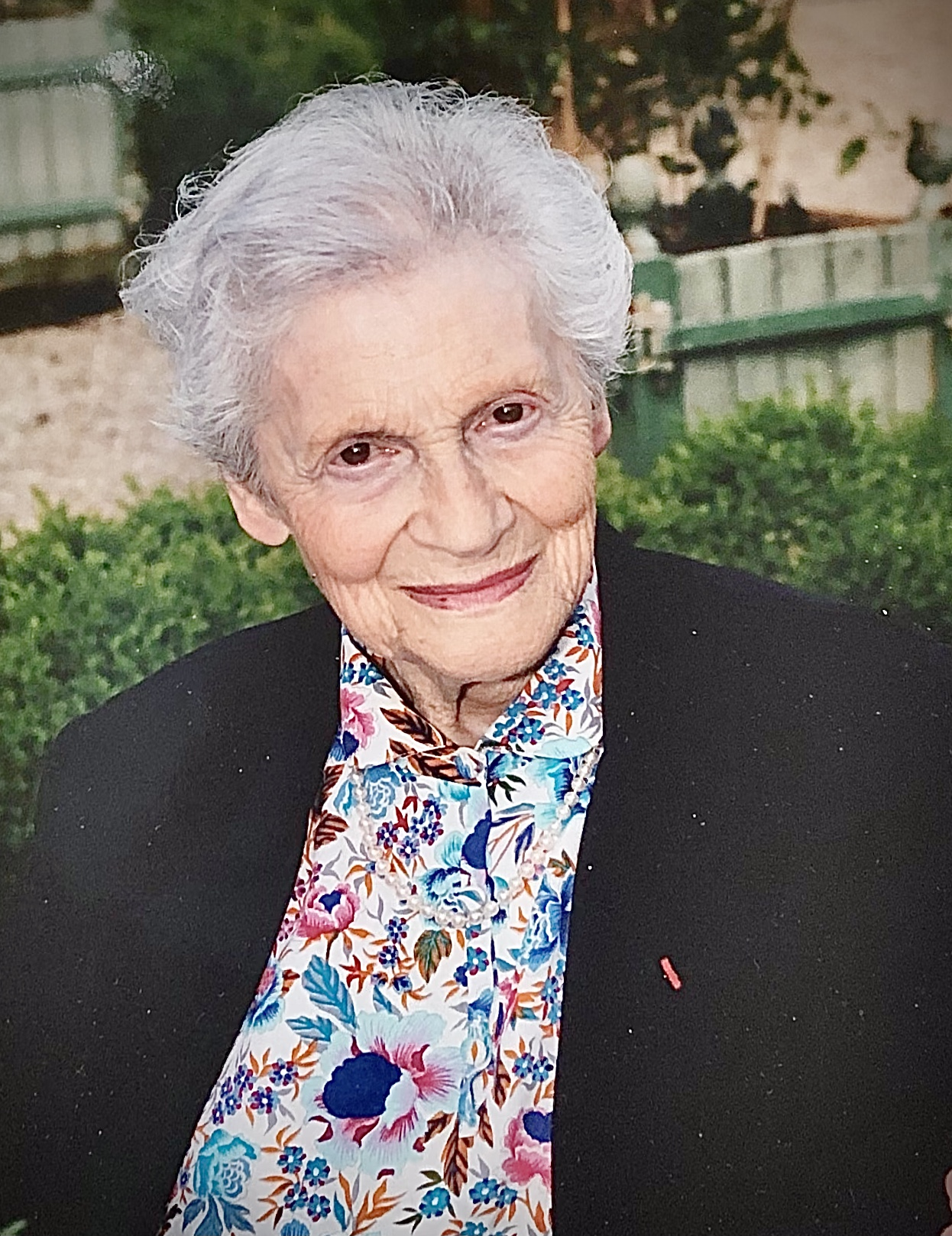
- Born: Liliane Lieber; 2 June 1924; Strasbourg, France
- Died: 8 July 2020 (aged 96); 9th arrondissement of Paris, France
- Occupation: Resistance member
- Spouse: Théo Klein
- Children: 3

Liliane Klein-Lieber (2 June 1924 – 8 July 2020) was a French Resistance member.

== Biography ==
She became in 1931 a member of the Eclaireuses et Eclaireurs israélites de France (EIF).

During the Second World War, she was a social worker in the Grenoble region and was a member of the French Resistance. She found hideouts and provided false papers. During this period, she used the name Lyne Leclerc.

She received the "Lion de Bronze" (in English : Bronze Lion) Award in 2006 for her commitment to the service of this movement.

Klein-Lieber was Jewish, she died on 8 July 2020, aged 96.

In 2021, with the help of Abu and Savannah, an EEIF groupe located in Paris were created with the name "Liliane Klein-Lieber", in order to commemorate Liliane.

== Awards ==
- Legion of Honour
- Cross of the resistance volunteer combatant
- Medal of the City of Paris

=== Bibliography ===
- Daniel Lee, Pétain's Jewish Children: French Jewish Youth and the Vichy Regime, Oxford Historical Monographs, Oxford University Press, 2014. ISBN 0198707150, ISBN 9780198707158
- Sarah Gensburger, National Policy, Global Memory: The Commemoration of the “Righteous” from Jerusalem to Paris, 1942–2007, Berghahn Books, 2016. ISBN 1785332554, ISBN 9781785332555
- Les anciens de la Résistance Juive; Georges Loinger (2002). Organisation juive de combat;Résistance-sauvetage, France 1940–1945. Mémoires (in French). Paris: Autrement. p. 447. ISBN 2-7467-0272-X. Ojc2002.
