= Jean Kahn =

French Jewish community leader

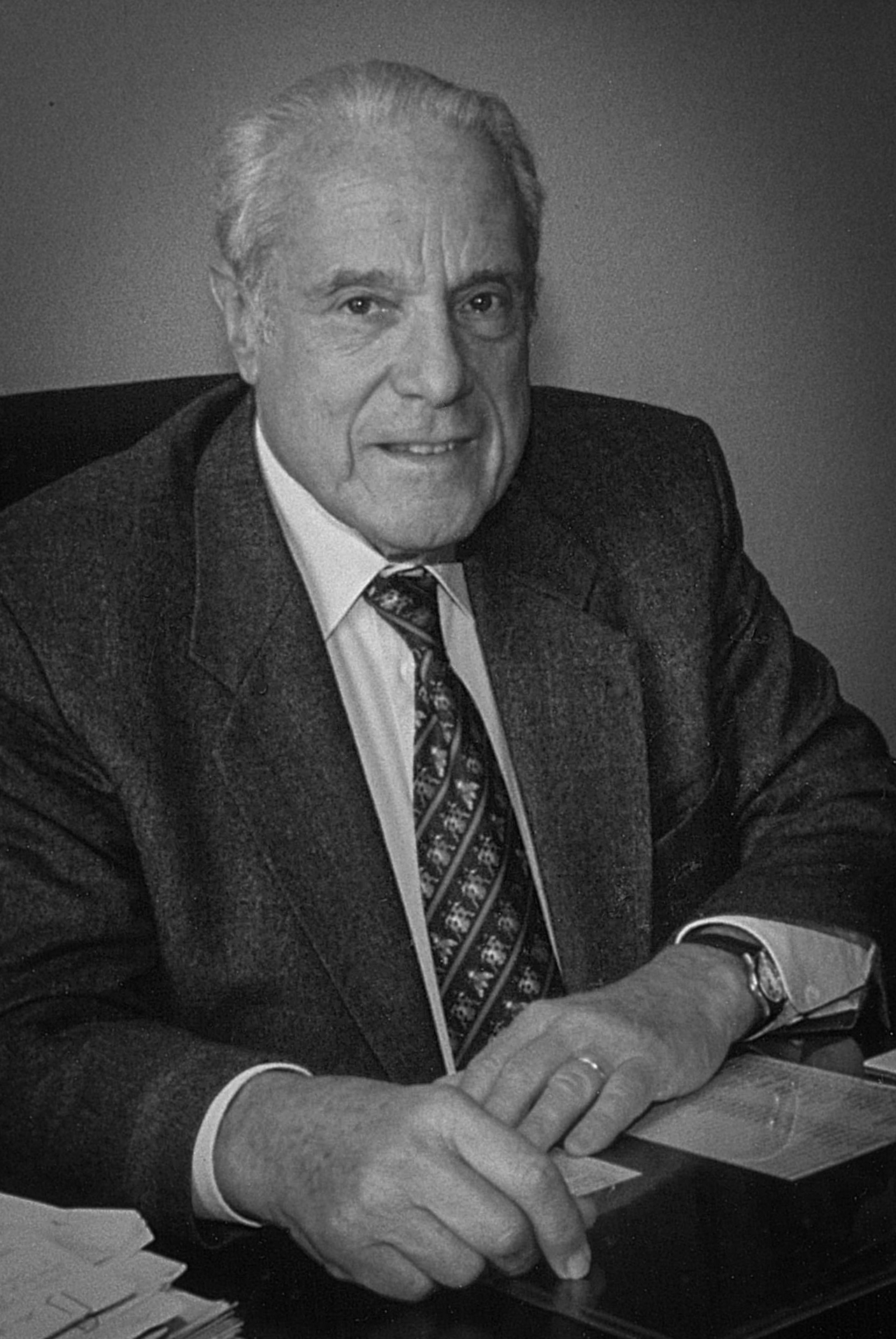
- Jean Kahn in 1995
- Title: President of the Council of French Jewish Institutions

Personal life
- Born: 17 May 1929 Strasbourg, France
- Died: 18 August 2013 (aged 84) Strasbourg, France

Religious life
- Religion: Judaism

Jewish leader
- Predecessor: Théo Klein
- Successor: Henri Hajdenberg
- Position: President
- Organisation: Conseil Représentatif des Institutions juives de France
- Began: 1989
- Ended: 1995

Jean Salomon Kahn (17 May 1929 – 18 August 2013) was a French Jewish community leader, human rights activist, and lawyer. Kahn served as the President of the Representative Council of Jewish Institutions in France (CRIF) from 1989 to 1995, as well as the CRIF's vice president from 1983 to 1985. He later served as the President of the European Jewish Congress and the Vice President of the World Jewish Congress. Kahn also headed the Central Consistory of France from 1995 to 2008.

== Biography ==
Kahn was born on 7 May 1929. He received a law degree from the University of Strasbourg and passed the bar in 1953. Kahn died on 18 August 2013 in Strasbourg, France, at the age of 84. Grand-nephew of France great rabbi Zadoc Kahn h e denounced during the trial of Klaus Barbie to denounce new holocaust denial movements and the diffusion of books such as the ones of Robert Faurisson or in Bernard Pivot's show Apostrophes, of Maurice Bardèche, to promote Robert Brasillach.

On 9 May 1990, in the program L'Heure de Vérité, which is also the day of the Affair of the desecration of the Jewish cemetery of Carpentras, Jean-Marie Le Pen declared that "the Jews have a lot of power in the press, as the Bretons have in the navy, or the Corsicans in customs, that does not seem to me debatable. As people from the National Front noticed that a certain number of Jewish lobbies, like that of Mr. Kahn, persecuted them systematically, they have the impression of seeing a lot of it, it's true”. The latter sued him for defamation and lost three times.

From 1991 to 1996, Jean Kahn was at the head of the European Jewish Congress. He is also vice-president of the World Jewish Congress.

On 4 February 1995, on the occasion of the fiftieth anniversary of the liberation of the Auschwitz-Birkenau camp, he protested against what he called the "nationalization of the Shoah" by the Polish government, refusing to recognize the specificity of the Jewish martyr. He also participated in the removal of the Carmel from Auschwitz.
