= Murder of Suzan Der Kirkour =

2019 murder in Idlib, Syria

- Location: Al-Yaqoubiyeh, Idlib, Syria
- Date: 8-9 of July 2019
- Weapon: Stoned to death
- Deaths: 1 (Suzan Der Kirkour, 60 year old Armenian Christian)
- Perpetrators: unknown, members of Al-Nusra Front suspected

The Suzan Der Kirkour case concerns the rape and murder of an Armenian woman aged 60 in Idlib, Syria on 8-9 July 2019. Her death was mentioned by the Syrian Observatory for Human Rights which also verified the incident.

== Timeline ==
Suzan Der Kirkour was a sixty-year-old Armenian woman (Christian by faith) - a retired gardener and Arabic teacher from al-Yaqoubiyeh village in Idlib, Syria. She used to provide various kind of help to the Kneye Village Church where she often helped youth achieve their baccalaureate.

The woman went missing on 8 July 2019. Worried by her absence, the priest sent parishioners to look for her. They found her lifeless body lying on the ground of her field on 9 July.

The autopsy revealed that Suzanne had suffered the torture of repeated rape since the afternoon of Monday until the early morning of Tuesday (for about 9 hours). Later, she was stoned to death by unidentified persons.
