= Richard Prasquier =

French cardiologist and Jewish leader (born 1945)

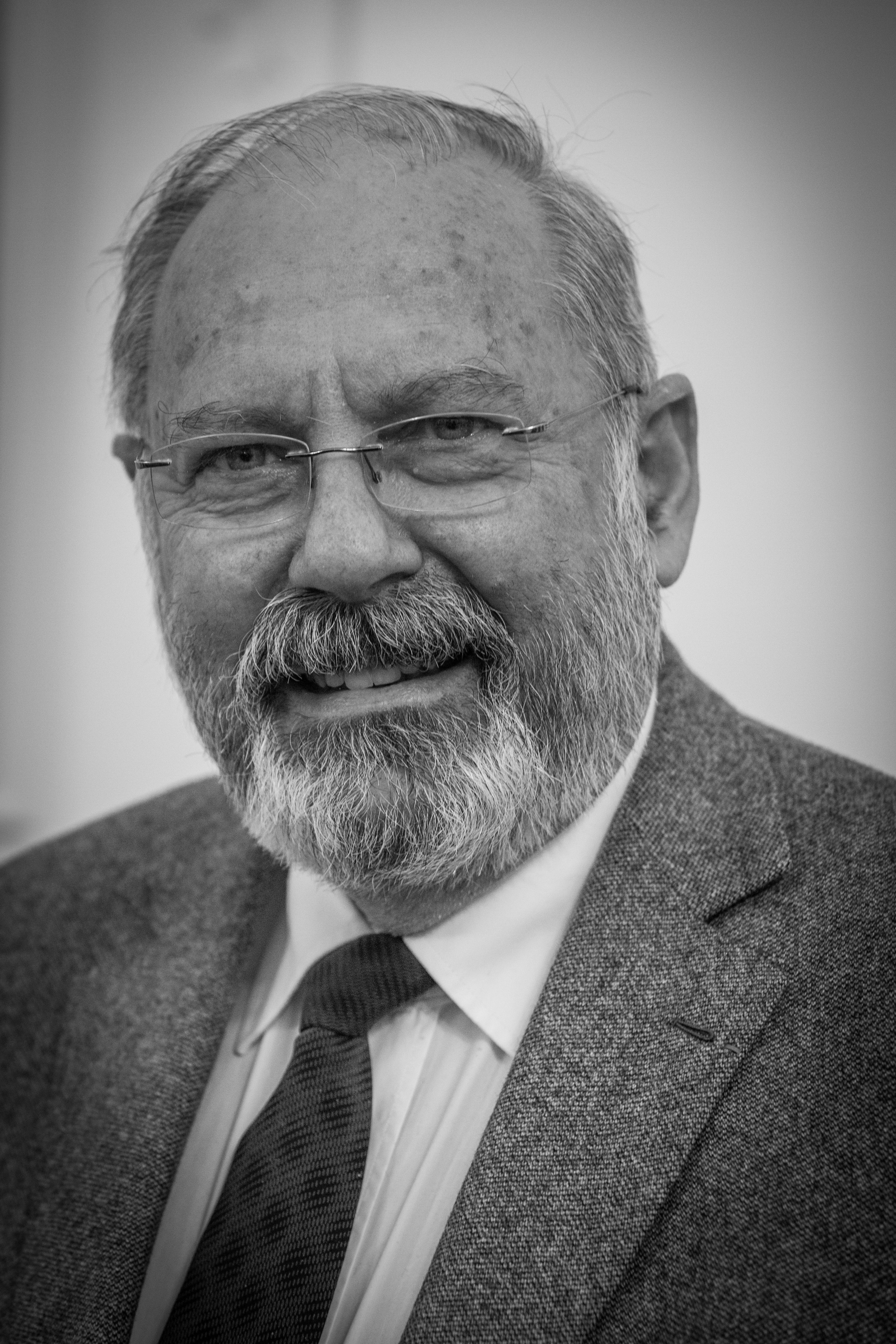
- Richard Prasquier in March 2016
- Born: Ryszard Praszkier; 7 July 1945 (age 81); Gdańsk, Poland
- Occupation: President of the CRIF (2007-2013)
- Predecessor: Roger Cukierman
- Successor: Roger Cukierman

Richard Prasquier (born 7 July 1945) is a French cardiologist and Jewish leader. He served as president of the Representative Council of French Jewish Institutions (CRIF) from 2007 to 2013.

== Biography ==
Prasquier was born as Ryszard Praszkier in Gdańsk, Poland, on 7 July 1945 to Holocaust survivors who wanted to emigrate to the United States after the 1946 Kielce pogrom against Jews in Poland, but decided to settle in France. After his schooling at the Lycée Charlemagne in Paris and studies in medicine which he completed with a Ph.D, Richard Prasquier became a cardiologist and later the director of the Hôpital Beaujon in Clichy. In 1989, he was a founding member of the Association des médecins d’origine polonaise de France, a grouping of French doctors of Polish origin.

In 1994, Prasquier began his activities with the Conseil représentatif des institutions juives de France (CRIF), the umbrella body of Jewish communities and organizations in France. He became head of the CRIF liaison group with the Catholic Bishop's Conference of France as well as the CRIF International Relations Committee. He also served on the board of the Fondation pour la Mémoire de la Shoah headed by Simone Veil, and in 1997 he became chairman of the French Committee for Yad Vashem.

In 2001, he was decorated with the French Legion of Honor.

In 2006, Prasquier was among those who welcomed Pope Benedict XVI at the former Nazi death camp Auschwitz-Birkenau.

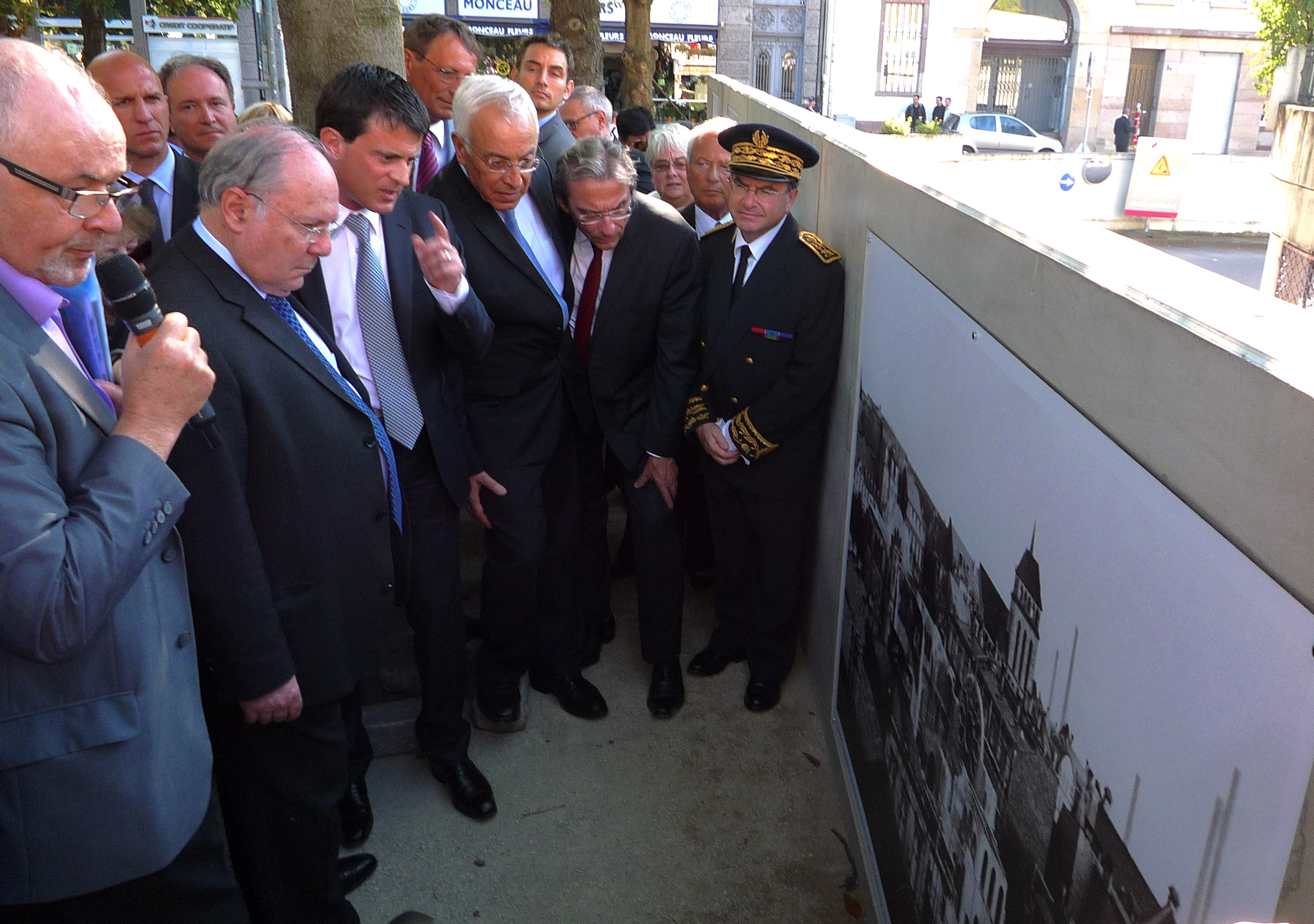
Inauguration of the Allée des Justes in Strasbourg on 22 July 2012 by Richard Prasquier and French Interior Minister Manuel Valls

On 13 May 2007, Prasquier was elected as president of the CRIF, beating two other candidates by a clear margin. He succeeded Roger Cukierman. Upon his election Prasquier said that for him, the CRIF was “the communal home of Judaism”, the place “where it is possible to express hopes, concerns and projects”, a place “to fight for Judaism”. He was re-elected in 2010 for a second mandate of three years, beating his rival Meyer Habib. In May 2013, being barred to stand for a third consecutive term, Prasquier was succeeded as CRIF president by his predecessor Roger Cukierman.

Prasquier is married and has five children.

== Political statements and actions ==
In September 2008, Prasquier led a CRIF delegation which met with Pope Benedict XVI in Paris during the Catholic pontiff's visit to France. "It was very important to us that that given his busy schedule he took the time out to meet with us on this special day, the Sabbath," Prasquier was quoted as saying after the meeting. He also praised the pope for condemning anti-Semitism. However, a few months later, Prasquier criticized the Vatican for lifting the excommunication of Richard Williamson, who in an interview with Swedish television had question the extent of the Holocaust. “The denial of the Shoah is not an opinion, but a crime,” Prasquier was quoted as saying.

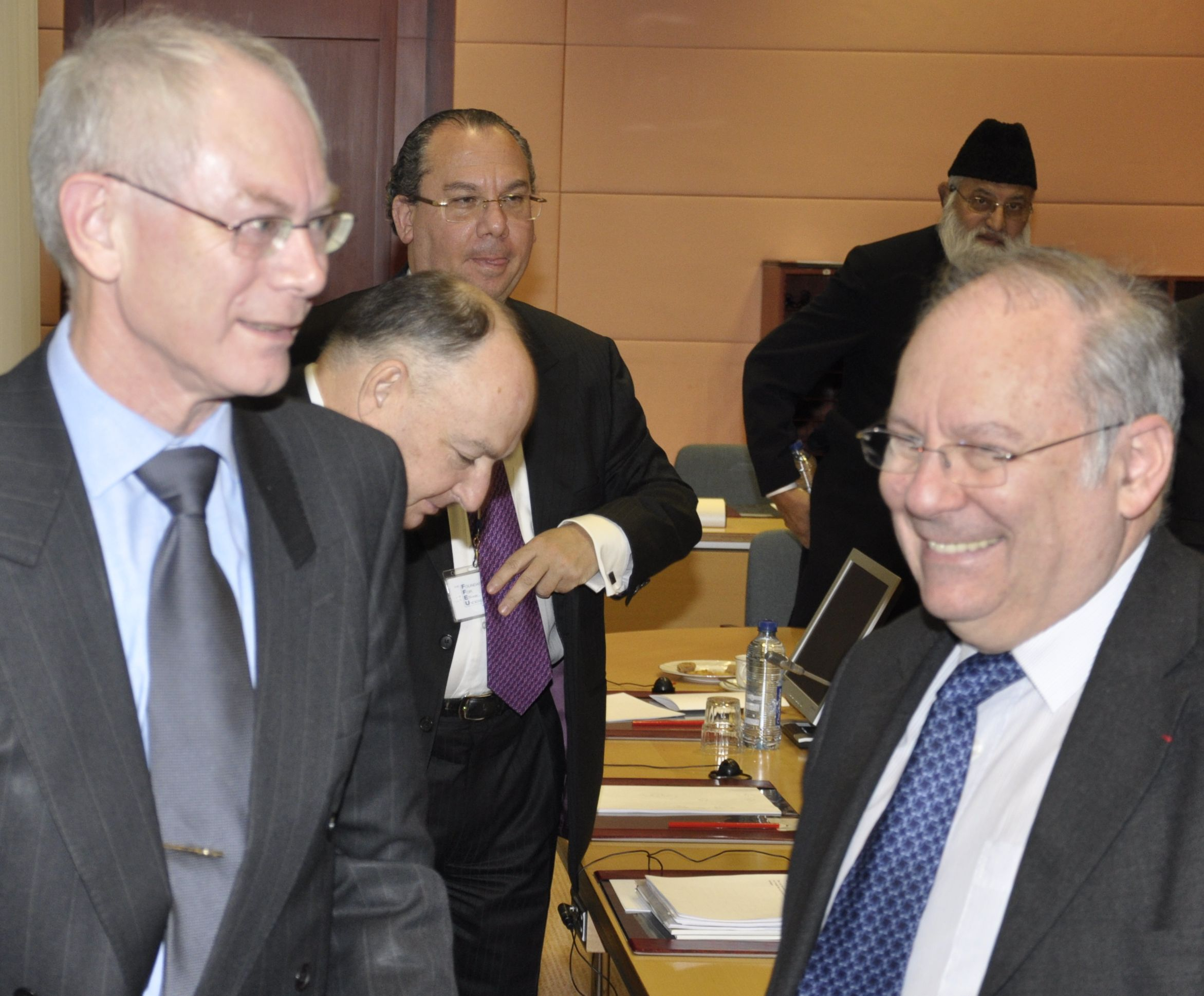
Herman Van Rompuy, president of the European Council, with French Jewish leader Richard Prasquier after a meeting of Jewish and Muslim leaders in Brussels, 6 December 2010

Prasquier is also engaged in talks with Muslim leaders, but in an interview with the French daily Le Figaro in October 2012 warned against complacency vis-à-vis a radical version of Islam that was on the rise. France had not fully taken stock of the threat it faces from radical Islamism, Prasquier told the newspaper, adding: “Radical Islam compares its enemies to animals. [...] In the same way, the Nazis compared Jews to bacteria, to rats, to animals.” According to The New York Times Prasquier told French radio France Info : "We must take the measure of this type of ideology. I say that radical Islamism is Nazi ideology.”

At repeated occasions, Prasquier has taken a strong stand in defense of Israel. In January 2009, during Israel's Operation Cast Lead in the Gaza Strip, he led a solidarity rally with Israel outside the Israeli embassy building in Paris. He said in his speech: “My position is not against the Palestinians, although I want to express my strong solidarity with Israel. It is against Hamas that I stand up, which is an obstacle to peace and with which no negotiation is possible.”
