= Francis Kalifat =

French businessman and philanthropist (born 1952)

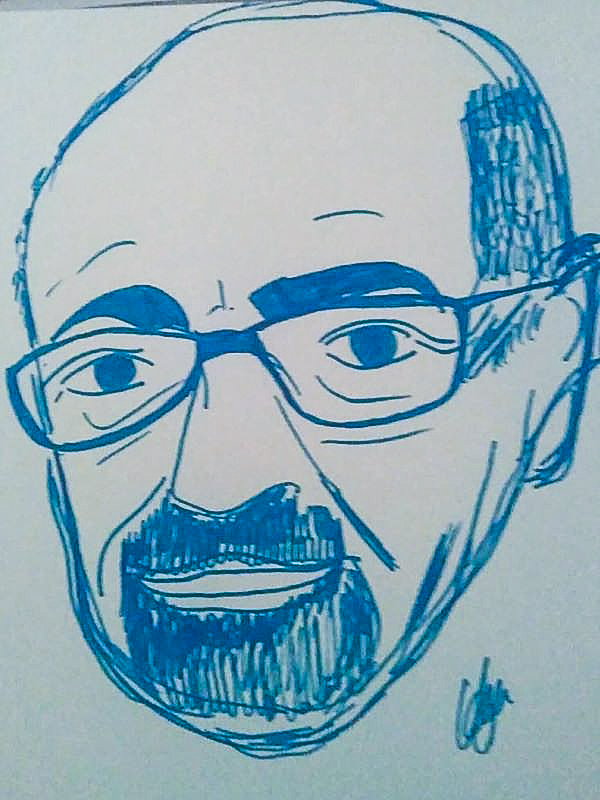
- Born: 1952 (age 73–74); Oran, Algeria
- Education: Lycée Hoche
- Alma mater: University of Paris-Sud
- Occupations: Businessman, philanthropist

Francis Kalifat (born 1952) is a French businessman and philanthropist. He is the president-elect of the Conseil Représentatif des Institutions juives de France, the umbrella organization for Jewish organisations in France.

== Early life ==
Francis Kalifat was born in 1952 to a Jewish family in Oran, French Algeria. He moved to Paris in 1962, at the end of the Algerian War. He grew up in Trappes, followed by Versailles.

Kalifat was educated at the Lycée Hoche. He graduated from University of Paris-Sud.

== Career ==
Kalifat started his own business, a shoe company, at the age of 22. He still runs the company.

== Other activities ==
Kalifat volunteered for the Betar as a teenager.

Kalifat joined the CRIF in 1984. He was elected as its treasurer in 2002, and as its vice president in 2013. Kalifat was elected as the president of the CRIF in May 2016. During his tenure, he wants to ban Boycott, Divestment and Sanctions (BDS) in France.
