= Fondation pour la Mémoire de la Shoah =

Foundation

Fondation pour la Mémoire de la Shoah is a foundation that was formed in 2000, with recovered money from the property taken from French Jews during World War II. Simone Veil, a survivor of Auschwitz concentration camp who later became the first directly elected President of the European Parliament, served as the Foundation's first president.

The Foundation supports history and research into Shoah (Holocaust) as well as other initiatives including activism around the rise of hate crimes.

The financial commission, chaired by a magistrate from the Court of Auditors, sees to the preservation of the value of the endowment and the proper use of its income.
