= Representative Council of French Jewish Institutions =

Jewish umbrella organization in France

Logo of CRIF.

Representative Council of French Jewish Institutions (French: Conseil représentatif des institutions juives de France, CRIF) is an umbrella organization of other groups representing the interests of French Jews.

== Overview ==
It is the official French affiliate of the World Jewish Congress (WJC), the world-wide umbrella organization of Jewish communities, and of the European Jewish Congress. It opposes antisemitism and antisemitic policies. It generally supports Zionism and the state of Israel, although in 2004 CRIF refuted Israeli Prime Minister Ariel Sharon's characterization of antisemitism in France and his calls for French Jews to emigrate to Israel.

On 20 November 2004, CRIF accused the French government of failing to protect citizens from broadcasts by Hezbollah's al-Manar TV, which includes films that CRIF asserts are antisemitic and incite Muslims to attack Jews. Al-Manar was blocked by the CSA. It has opposed the beatification of Pope Pius XII, stating that a majority of historians disagreed with the position that Pius worked ceaselessly to save Jews.

French neo-Nazis planned an attack on the CRIF headquarters in 2023. Kalashnikovs and a laboratory for producing explosives were discovered at a suspect's home. In chat messages they wrote that they wanted to carry out an attack “worse than Bataclan”.

== Presidents of the Council of French Jewish Institutions ==
No.	Image	President	Term
1		Léon Meiss	1944–1950
2		Vidal Modiano	1950–1969
3		Ady Steg (1925–2021)	1970–1974
4		Jean Rosenthal (1906–1993)	1974–1976
5		Alain de Rothschild (1910–1982)	1976–1982
6		Théo Klein (1920–2020)	1983–1989
7		Jean Kahn (1929–2013)	1989 - 1995
8		Henri Hajdenberg (b. 1947)	1995–2001
9		Roger Cukierman (b. 1936)	2001–2007
10		Richard Prasquier (b. 1945)	2007–2013
11		Roger Cukierman (b. 1936)	2013–2016
12		Francis Kalifat (b. 1952)	2016 – 2022
13		Yonathan Arfi (b. 1980)	2022 – Incumbent
