= Buzyn (surname) =

Buzyn is a surname. Notable people with the surname include:

- Agnès Buzyn (born 1962), French hematologist and politician
- Élie Buzyn (1929–2022), Polish-born French orthopedic surgeon
