= Investigating judge (France) =

Role in French criminal law

In French criminal law, the investigation phase (French: instruction) in a criminal proceeding is the procedure during which an investigating judge (juge d'instruction) gathers evidence on the commission of an offense and decides whether to refer the persons charged to the trial court.

The investigating judge is the first instance of investigation. In the second instance (appeals), the investigating chamber of the French courts of appeal have jurisdiction. They rule on appeals of decisions by the investigating judges and of decisions by the liberty and custody judge (juge des libertés et de la détention).

== Background ==
=== Inquisitorial system ===
In an inquisitorial system, the trial judges (mostly plural in serious crimes) are inquisitors who actively participate in fact-finding public inquiry by questioning defense lawyers, prosecutors, and witnesses. They could even order certain pieces of evidence to be examined if they find presentation by the defense or prosecution to be inadequate. Prior to the case getting to trial, investigating judges participate in the investigation of a case, often assessing material by police and consulting with the prosecutor.

== History ==
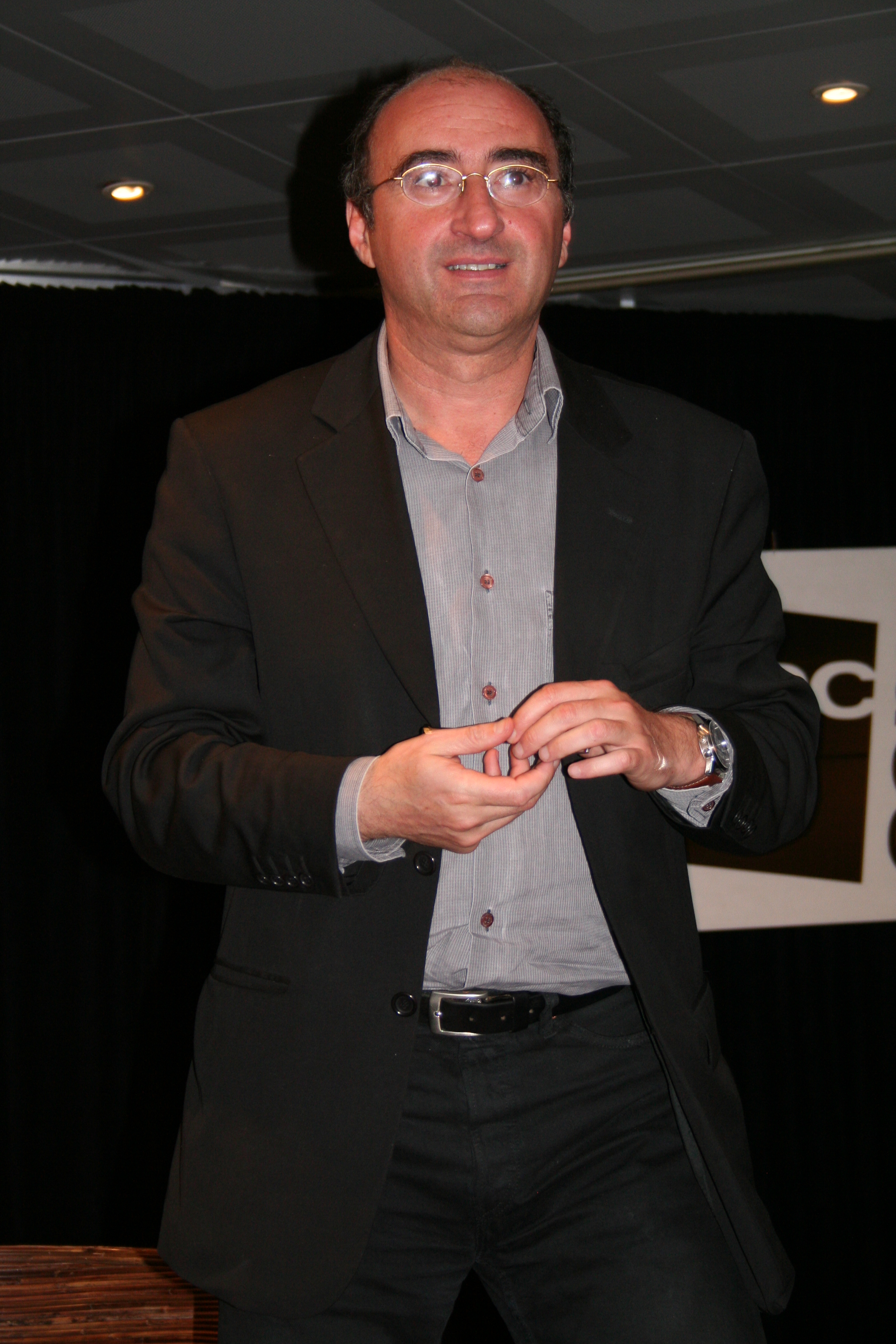
Éric Halphen, formerly a French investigative judge

=== Precursors ===
Until the development of the Medieval Inquisition in the 12th century, the legal systems used in medieval Europe generally relied on the adversarial system to determine whether someone should be tried and whether a person was guilty or innocent.

Beginning in 1198, Pope Innocent III issued a series of decretals that reformed the ecclesiastical court system, empowering ecclesiastical courts to summon and interrogate witnesses on their own initiative. This was confirmed by the Fourth Lateran Council in 1215. As a result, in parts of continental Europe, the ecclesiastical courts operating under the inquisitional procedure became the dominant method by which disputes were adjudicated. In France, the parlements—lay courts—also employed inquisitorial proceedings.

=== Origins ===
In France, the investigative judge has been a feature of the judicial system since the mid-19th century, and the preliminary investigative procedure has been a part of the judicial system from at least the 17th century. The sweeping powers traditionally entrusted to the investigating judge were so broad that Honoré de Balzac called the investigating judge "the most powerful man in France" in the 19th century. In a celebrated although exaggerated passage, Balzac wrote that "No human authority, neither the king nor the minister of justice nor the prime minister can intrude on the power of the investigating judge, no one can stop him, nobody gives him orders. He is sovereign, obeying only his conscience and the law."

=== Reforms ===
Later, however, the authority of the investigating judges in France was diminished by a series of reforms. In 1985, French justice minister Robert Badinter proposed limiting the investigating judge's role in making custody decisions; Badinter's successor, Albin Chalandon made the same proposal two years later. In 1990, Justice Minister Pierre Arpaillange convened a Human Rights Commission (Justice Penale et Droits de l'Homme), led by the legal scholar Mireille Delmas-Marty. The commission concluded that France's criminal procedure code violated human rights standards, noting that the investigating judge combined investigative and judicial powers in a single person. The commission proposed a package of due process reforms, including the abolition of the post of investigating judge and the creation of a "liberty judge" (juge des libertés) in its place. Under the proposed system, the prosecutor and the police would have sole responsibility for conducting the investigation, and the liberty judge would be charged with overseeing pre-trial investigations.

This proposal prompted an outcry from the conservative judiciary, as well as from scholars and the media; "in the context of repeated investigations of Socialist Party officials, the proposition appeared self-interested." Less extensive reforms were adopted instead; legislation that became effective in 1994 provided a right to counsel for persons in police custody (garde à vue), and also transferred the decision on bail and pretrial detention "to a team of magistrates not involved in the particular case." Almost immediately, however, opponents of the reforms mobilized, upset with the substantial changes to historic French practice; several magistrates resigned in protest. The new minister of justice, Pierre Méhaignerie, pledged repeal. The reforms were reversed in August 1993, when a new law repealed the right to have counsel at the beginning of police detention (but retained the right to have counsel after 20 hours of detention); restored "the powers of the 'solitary' investigating judge involved in the case to bail or remand"; and again restricted the accused's access to the investigative dossier.

Reforms resumed in 2000, with the enactment of the Guigou Law. This followed the report of the Truche Commission and a proposal to revise the French code of criminal procedure by Michèle-Laure Rassat. Among other reforms, the 2000 law abolished the power of the investigating judge to remand defendants into custody and created a new specialized judicial officer, the judge of liberty and custody (juge des libertés et de la détention) to make these determinations.

Renewed calls for further reform to abolish or diminish the powers of the French investigating judge intensified after a series of botched investigations, including what became known as the Outreau scandal. In that case, more than a dozen people near Boulogne were wrongfully imprisoned (and about half wrongfully convicted) on false charges of child abuse after a flawed investigation by an inexperienced judge. In 2009 and 2010, President Nicolas Sarkozy unsuccessfully attempted to abolish the post of investigating judge as part of a broader package of legal reforms.

== Duties and procedure ==
Investigating judges initiate an investigation upon an order of the procureur (public prosecutor), or upon the request of a private citizen. The investigating judge may issue Letters rogatory, order the seizure of necessary evidence, compel witnesses to appear and give evidence, and request expert testimony; at an investigative hearing, the judge may have witnesses confront each other or the accused. They may also authorize wiretaps. At a later plenary hearing in open court, the investigative judge may issue an order of non-lieu ("no case") or, if the evidence is sufficient, will commit the case to the trial court. Charges of a serious misdemeanor or lesser felonies go to the criminal court directly. In contrast, major felonies are referred to the Court of Appeal for the pretrial hearing. The Court of Appeal decides whether to approve the judge's recommendation and, if it does, the case is turned over to the Assize Court. investigating judges are not involved at trials, although, in France, criminal trials are "in many respects a continuation of the pretrial investigation", with the trial judge acting as the leading figure in the examination of witnesses.

== Types of magistrates ==
Today, investigating judges are one of four types of French magistrates, the others being trial judges (magistrats de siège), public prosecutors (magistrats debout), and policymaking and administrative magistrates at the Ministry of Justice. Each investigating judge is appointed by the president of France upon the recommendation of the Ministry of Justice and serves renewable three-year terms. Magistrates "can move between these four categories, and their career prospects may be subject to the political interests of the government (although promotions must be approved by a high council of the magistrature chaired in the past by the President of the Republic and now by the president of the cour de cassation)." This arrangement has prompted criticism on the ground that the judiciary is not fully independent of the government.

== Independence, and criticism ==
In 1996, political scientist Herbert Jacobs described the still-extensive powers and authority of the investigating judge:

The investigating judge ... is responsible for assuring the quality of the investigation that underlies the prosecution, [and] enjoys sweeping powers. In serious cases the magistrate directs the investigation personally, ordering any potentially relevant witnesses to appear and authorizing searches of premises, seizure of financial records, examination by experts and viewings of physical evidence as he or she sees fit. The investigating judge can delegate some investigatory decisions to police, but the responsibility lies ultimately with the magistrate.

== Statistics ==
In the year 2000, only about 7% of criminal investigations in France were directed by an investigating judge. By 2010, that number had declined further to 4%, with police overseeing the rest. Notably, in 2002, there were 562 investigating magistrates in France, with some 60,000 investigations ongoing at any given moment, so caseloads were large and individual attention to each was difficult. But, investigating judges "are seen as important, independent arbiters, examining the most sensitive and serious allegations." A few investigating judges, such as Renaud Van Ruymbeke, Thierry Jean-Pierre, and Éric Halphen have become widely known for their investigations into corruption and political scandals; such figures have investigated high-level government officials, including prime ministers, and made widely publicized visits to the headquarters of the major French political parties, reflecting their broad powers.

Despite high media attention and frequent portrayals in TV series, examining judges are active in a small minority of cases. In 2005, there were 1.1 million criminal rulings in France, while only 33,000 new cases were investigated by judges. The vast majority of cases are therefore investigated directly by law enforcement agencies (police, gendarmerie) under the supervision of the Office of Public Prosecution.

== Employment and unions ==
In France, many magistrates belong to trade unions. About 60% belong to the Union syndicale des magistrats (USM), which is center-left, while about 30% belong to the leftist Syndicat de la Magistrature (SM). The unions represent the interests of magistrates, but by French law they are barred from striking.

== See also ==
- Adversarial system
- Codification (law)
- Cour d'appel
- Court of Appeal (France)
- Court of Cassation
- Criminal justice system of France
- Declaration of the Rights of Man and of the Citizen
- French penal code
- Glossary of French criminal law
- Law of France
- Napoleonic Code – civil, not criminal
- Nulla poena sine lege
- Principle of legality in French criminal law

== Works cited ==
- Anderson, Malcolm (2011). In Thrall to Political Change: Police and Gendarmerie in France. Oxford University Press. ISBN 9780199693641. OCLC 906084292.
- Cole, Alistair (2015). French Politics and Society (2d ed.). Routledge. ISBN 9781317376958. OCLC 984993770.
- The Editors of Encyclopaedia, ed. (26 April 2002). "Juge d'instruction". Encyclopedia Britannica.
- Fenyk, Jaroslav (November 2000). "Reflections on Development of the Authorities of Public Prosecution and on Importance of Some Principles of Criminal Procedure" in the European Democracies, in What Public Prosecution in Europe in the 21st Century. Proceedings of the Pan-European Conference, Strasbourg, 22–24 May 2000, Council of Europe. ISBN 9287144729. OCLC 604386710.
- Gilliéron, Gwladys (2014). Public Prosecutors in the United States and Europe: A Comparative Analysis with Special Focus on Switzerland, France, and Germany. Springer International. ISBN 9783319045030. OCLC 918792441.
- Jacob, Herbert (1996). Courts, Law, and Politics in Comparative Perspective. Yale University Press. ISBN 9780300063790. OCLC 318372322.
- Lichfield, John (15 March 2002). "Why the French are growing envious of Britain's justice system". The Independent. ISSN 0951-9467. OCLC 185201487.
- Salas, Denis (2002). Mireille Delmas-Marty; J.R. Spencer (eds.). "The Role of the Judge" in European Criminal Procedures. Cambridge University Press. ISBN 9780521678483. OCLC 850972090.
- Saltmarsh, Matthew (5 July 2010). "Sarkozy's Legal Reforms Run Into Obstacles". The New York Times. ISSN 1553-8095. OCLC 1645522. Archived from the original on 29 August 2018.
- Samuel, Henry (7 January 2009). "Nicolas Sarkozy to abolish controversial French magistrate". The Telegraph. ISSN 2059-7487. OCLC 49632006. Archived from the original on 13 April 2017.
- Vogler, Richard (2017) [2005:Ashgate]. A World View of Criminal Justice (Routledge ed.). Ashgate Publishing. ISBN 9780754624677. OCLC 990796912.
