= Superior Council of the Judiciary (France) =

French constitutional body

- Conseil supérieur de la magistrature
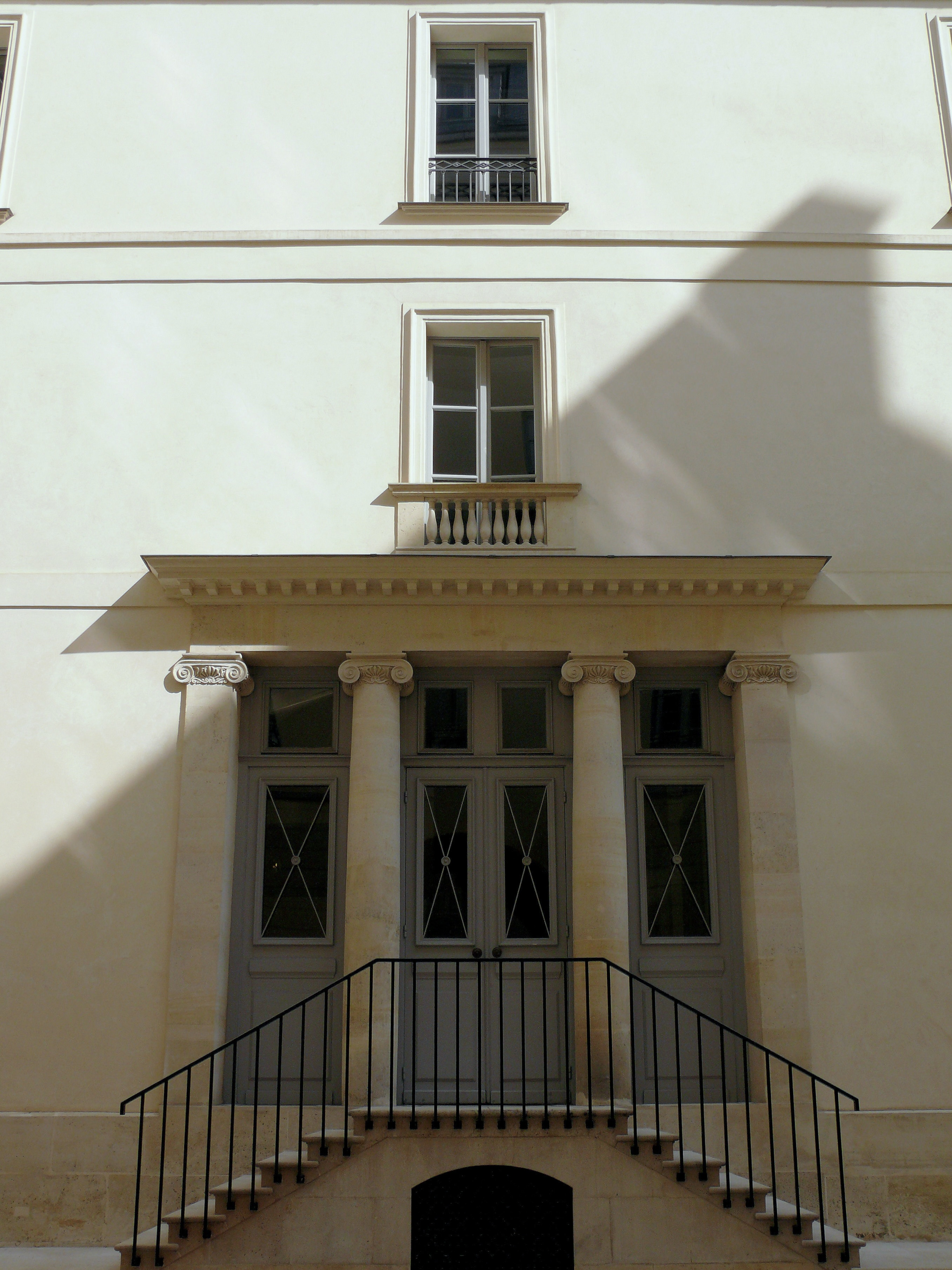
- Abbreviation: CSM
- Type: Constitutional body
- Headquarters: Hôtel Moreau, 20 rue de la Chaussée-d'Antin, 9th arrondissement
- Location: Paris, France
- Coordinates: 48°52′21″N 2°20′03″E
- Members: 22 councilors
- Official language: French
- Website: https://www.conseil-superieur-magistrature.fr

The Superior Council of the Judiciary (French: Conseil supérieur de la magistrature - CSM) is a French constitutional body whose role is to guarantee the independence of the judiciary from the executive. More specifically, it is responsible for appointing and disciplining magistrates. It also intervenes at the request of the President of the Republic or the Minister of Justice to issue opinions on the operation of the justice system or the ethics of magistrates. Its operation is governed by articles 64 and 65 of the Constitution.

Its administrative counterparts are the Superior Council of Administrative Tribunals and Administrative Courts of Appeal and the Superior Council of Regional Audit Chambers.

The Council is headquartered at the Hôtel Moreau, 20, rue de la Chaussée-d'Antin in the 9th arrondissement of Paris.

== History ==
=== Origins ===
The term "Superior Council of the Judiciary" first appeared in the judicial vocabulary with a law of August 30, 1883 on the reform of judicial organization: this was the name given to the Court of Cassation ruling in all chambers on matters of magistrate discipline.

It was not until the Fourth Republic and the changes brought about by the Liberation that an autonomous constitutional body was created under the same name. The Council was chaired by the President of the Republic, with the Minister of Justice as Vice-President. It is made up of six members elected by the National Assembly, four magistrates elected by their peers, and two members appointed by the Head of State from among the judicial professions. The Council's powers are extensive: it proposes the appointment of judges to the President of the Republic; it ensures the independence and discipline of these judges and the administration of the courts.

=== The Council under the Fifth Republic ===
The Constitution of October 4, 1958 radically reformed the Superior Council of the Judiciary. Its composition was modified: around the President of the Republic and the Minister of Justice, who remain President and Vice-President, nine members are appointed by the President of the Republic, either directly (two qualified personalities) or on the proposal of the bureau of the Court of Cassation (six magistrates) or the general assembly of the Council of State (one State Councillor). The Council's powers are limited: it now only proposes to the President of the Republic the appointment of all judges to the Court of Cassation and the first presidents of the Courts of Appeal; it gives a simple opinion on the proposed appointments of other judges; confirmed as a disciplinary council for judges, it rules under the chairmanship of the First President of the Court of Cassation.

The Constitutional Act of July 27, 1993 and the Organic Act of February 5, 1994 transformed the institution once again, creating two panels, one for judges and the other for prosecutors. The Council continues to be chaired by the President of the Republic, with the Minister of Justice continuing to hold the vice-presidency. Magistrates sitting on the Council are now elected by their peers. The Council is required to issue an opinion on all judicial appointments, and is given the power to issue an opinion (which does not have to be followed) on the appointment of public prosecutors, with the exception of those whose posts are currently filled by the Council of Ministers (public prosecutor at the Court of Cassation and public prosecutors at the Court of Appeal).

The Constitutional Act of July 23, 2008 put an end to the presidency of the Council by the President of the Republic, broadened its membership (with magistrates now in the minority), gave it consultative powers over the appointment of public prosecutors, and enabled individuals to refer disciplinary matters directly to it.

An organic law passed in 2016 put an end to the appointment of public prosecutors by the Council of Ministers.

Since 1953, the Council had been based at the Palais de l'Alma, 15 quai Branly, Paris, in an annex of the French President's office, but on occasion, meetings were held at the Élysée Palace. Following the 2008 reform, the Council's headquarters were transferred to 20 avenue de Ségur, then in June 2013 to the Hôtel Moreau.

=== Abandoned reform projects ===
==== 1998–2000 project ====
A reform initiated in 1998 extended to public prosecutors appointments made in accordance with the advice of the Superior Council of the Judiciary. The text also modified the composition of the Council by providing for 21 members (11 outside personalities and 10 magistrates). The bill was adopted by the National Assembly and the Senate, and put to a vote in Congress on January 24, 2000. A few days before the vote, the Congress meeting was cancelled by President Jacques Chirac.

==== 2013–2016 project ====
A constitutional bill presented to the Council of Ministers in 2013 aimed to restore the magistrates' majority on the Council, with the other personalities appointed by authorities independent of political power. The Council's role was strengthened with regard to the appointment and discipline of public prosecutors. In 2016, the text was adopted by both parliamentary chambers in identical terms, but Congress was not convened.

==== 2018–2019 project ====
The Édouard Philippe government's bills for a renewal of democratic life, presented in 2018 and reworked in 2019, provided for the appointment of public prosecutors on the assent of the Superior Council of the Judiciary, which also became fully responsible for their discipline. The reform was finally abandoned in the context of the COVID-19 pandemic.

=== Development paths ===
Inspired by the prerogatives devolved to the Superior Councils of the Judiciary in several European Union countries, certain magistrates' unions have been calling for a far-reaching reform conferring on the Superior Council of the Judiciary the full power to appoint and discipline judges and prosecutors. In such a scenario, the Judicial Services Department would be attached to the Council rather than to the Ministry of Justice.

As part of the Estates General on Justice organized between 2021 and 2022 by Emmanuel Macron at the request of Chantal Arens and François Molins, respectively First President and Public Prosecutor of the Court of Cassation, the organization steering working group is proposing a reform described as "disruptive", entrusting the Superior Council of the Judiciary with all budgetary management and human resources steering for the judicial system. In addition to transferring all the prerogatives currently conferred on the Minister of Justice in matters of appointment and discipline, the Superior Council of the Judiciary would also be responsible for the budgetary management of the courts and tribunals. In its final report, submitted to the President of the Republic on July 8, 2022, the States General Committee ruled out this proposal and suggested that the reform envisaged in 2018 would be completed. The Committee also proposed that the Council would be given a consultative role with regard to the justice budget.

== Role ==
According to the Constitution of October 4, 1958, "the President of the Republic is the guarantor of the independence of the judicial authority. He is assisted by the Superior Council of the Judiciary". In particular, the Council is responsible for appointing and disciplining magistrates.

=== Appointment of magistrates ===
In France, under Article 13 of the Constitution of October 4, 1958, it is the President of the Republic who appoints civil and military officials. In most cases, these appointments are made "on proposal" by another authority, which is bound by the President's choice. Judges are appointed by decree, the proposal being made either by the Superior Council of the Judiciary, or by the Minister of Justice:

- The Superior Council of the Judiciary proposes directly to the President of the Republic the appointment of judges of the Court of Cassation, first presidents of courts of appeal and presidents of judicial tribunals.
- The Minister of Justice proposes all other positions to the President of the Republic, but must first obtain the opinion of the Superior Council of the Judiciary. In the case of judges, the Council's opinion is binding on the Minister, who may not propose the appointment of a judge whose opinion has not been respected. In the case of public prosecutors, the Minister can override an unfavorable Council opinion. In practice, successive governments have followed all CSM opinions since 2010.

In matters of appointments, the Superior Council of the Judiciary operates through two formations: one for judicial magistrates, chaired by the First President of the Court of Cassation, and one for prosecutors, chaired by the Prosecutor General at the Court of Cassation. Each formation includes magistrates and non-magistrate personalities, with the latter appointed by the President of the Republic, the President of the National Assembly, the President of the Senate, and the Council of State, ensuring a balanced composition for overseeing magistrate appointments.

=== Discipline of magistrates ===
In disciplinary matters, the matter may be referred to the Superior Council of the Judiciary by:

- the Minister of Justice;
- first presidents of courts of appeal or presidents of higher courts of appeal for judges, public prosecutors at courts of appeal or public prosecutors at higher courts of appeal for public prosecutors;
- any individual who believes that the conduct of a magistrate in the performance of his or her duties in the course of legal proceedings concerning him or her is liable to be classified as disciplinary.

In disciplinary matters, the Superior Council of the Judiciary operates through two formations: one for judicial magistrates, chaired by the First President of the Court of Cassation, and one for prosecutors, chaired by the Prosecutor General at the Court of Cassation. Each formation includes both magistrates and non-magistrate personalities to ensure balanced oversight of disciplinary proceedings for magistrates.

In the case of judges, the Council directly imposes disciplinary sanctions. In this case, the Council is regarded as an administrative court of first and last instance, whose decisions are subject to judicial review by the State Council.

In the case of public prosecutors, the Council confines itself to issuing an opinion, with disciplinary action being taken by the Minister of Justice (the CSM is therefore not a sanctioning court). The Minister's decision may be challenged before the Council of State, which then rules in the first and last instance as a judge of excess of power. If the Minister declares that he will follow the opinion of the CSM, renouncing his own power of decision, his decision may be annulled on the grounds of negative incompetence.

Sanctions (in the case of judges) and sanctions (in the case of public prosecutors) are decided by majority vote. In the event of a tied vote on the choice of sanction, the chairman of the panel has the casting vote.

The disciplinary sanctions applicable to magistrates are:

- reprimand with entry on file;
- compulsory removal;
- removal from certain functions;
- prohibition from being appointed or designated as a single judge for a maximum period of five years;
- lowering of step;
- temporary exclusion from service for a maximum of one year, with total or partial deprivation of salary;
- demotion;
- compulsory retirement or admission to cease service if the magistrate is not entitled to a retirement pension;
- dismissal.

=== Advisory Opinions and Guarantee of Judicial Independence ===
To ensure the independence of the judicial authority, the Superior Council of the Judiciary meets in plenary session to respond to advisory requests from the President of the Republic. It issues opinions on matters related to magistrate ethics and any issues concerning the functioning of the justice system raised by the Minister of Justice.

The Judicial Ethics Committee is tasked with issuing opinions on ethical questions concerning individual magistrates, upon their request or that of their hierarchical superiors, and reviewing magistrates' declarations of interests.

== Composition ==
The formation of the Council responsible for judicial magistrates is chaired by the First President of the Court of Cassation. It includes seven magistrates and eight external personalities.

The formation responsible for prosecutors is chaired by the Prosecutor General at the Court of Cassation. It includes seven magistrates and eight external personalities.

Except for the two presidents, who serve as long as they hold their positions at the Court of Cassation, Council members are appointed for a four-year, non-renewable term.

Magistrates, excluding heads of jurisdiction, are elected on union lists (Union syndicale des magistrats, Syndicat de la magistrature, and Unité Magistrats) through indirect suffrage, with electors traveling to the grand chamber of the Court of Cassation.

The eight external personalities (the "lay members") include one Council of State member appointed by the Council of State, one lawyer, and six qualified individuals who are not members of Parliament, the judicial order, or the administrative order. The President of the Republic, the President of the National Assembly, and the President of the Senate each appoint two qualified individuals. Nominations must be approved by parliamentary committees and respect gender parity.

One out-of-hierarchy judicial magistrate from the Court of Cassation
	President	Magistrate members	External members
Competent panel for sitting magistrates	The First President of the Court of Cassation	A senior judge of the Cour de cassation (French Supreme Court); A first president of a court of appeal; A president of a judicial court; Two judges; One public prosecutor	Two qualified personalities appointed by the President of the Republic; Two qualified personalities appointed by the President of the French National Assembly; Two qualified personalities appointed by the President of the Senate; One State Councillor; A lawyer
Panel for public prosecutors	The Public Prosecutor at the Court of Cassation	A senior prosecutor at the Cour de cassation (French Supreme Court); A public prosecutor at a court of appeal; A public prosecutor at a judicial court; Two public prosecutors; One judge	Two qualified personalities appointed by the President of the Republic; Two qualified personalities appointed by the President of the French National Assembly; Two qualified personalities appointed by the President of the Senate; One State Councillor; A lawyer

The plenary formation of the Council, which responds to advisory requests from the President of the Republic or the Minister of Justice, includes seven magistrates and the eight external personalities. It is chaired by the First President of the Court of Cassation, who may be substituted by the Prosecutor General at that court.

The plenary session of the Superior Council of the Judiciary
	President	Magistrate members	External members
First half of the mandate	The First President of the Cour de cassation	The first president of a court of appeal; The public prosecutor for a judicial court; The two judges of the "siege" panel; The two prosecuting magistrates of the "parquet" panel	The eight external members
Second half of the mandate	The First President of the Cour de cassation	The public prosecutor at a court of appeal; The president of a judicial court; The two judges of the "siege" panel; The two prosecuting magistrates of the "parquet" panel	The eight external members

Members of the Superior Council of the Judiciary must submit a declaration of interests and assets to the French High Authority for the Transparency of Public Life (French: Haute Autorité pour la transparence de la vie publique).

With the exception of disciplinary matters, the Minister of Justice may attend meetings of the Superior Council of the Judiciary.

The current members of the Council began their four-year term of office on February 8, 2023.

Mandate 2023-2027 of the Superior Council of the Judiciary
	President	Magistrate members	External members
Competent panel for sitting magistrates	Christophe Soulard	Pascal Chauvin (chamber president at the Court of Cassation); Catherine Farinelli (First President of the Amiens Court of Appeal); Julien Simon-Delcros (president of the Orléans judicial court); Jean-Baptiste Haquet (Chamber President, Nancy Court of Appeal); Clara Grande (vice-president of the Marseilles judicial court); Alexis Bouroz (First Advocate General at the Paris Court of Appeal)	Élisabeth Guigou (former Minister of Justice); Patrick Titiun (former head of the private office of the President of the European Court of Human Rights); Diane Roman (professor at the Sorbonne Law School - University Panthéon-Sorbonne); Loïc Cadiet (professor at the Sorbonne Law School - University Panthéon-Sorbonne); Dominique Lottin (former member of the French Constitutional Council); Patrick Wachsmann (professor emeritus of public law at the University of Strasbourg); Jean-Luc Forget (member of the Toulouse Bar, former president of the Conférence des bâtonniers, former vice-president of the Conseil national des barreaux); Christian Vigouroux (Honorary Section President of the Council of State)
Panel for public prosecutors	François Molins (until June 2023); Rémy Heitz (since June 2023)	Madeleine Mathieu (general counsel to the Court of Cassation); Pierre-Yves Couilleau (public prosecutor at the Bordeaux court of appeal); Rémi Coutin (public prosecutor, Évreux judicial court); Véronique Surel (deputy public prosecutor, Nantes judicial court); Laurent Fekkar (deputy public prosecutor, Montpellier judicial court); Céline Parisot (vice-president of the Grenoble judicial court)	

== Election results ==
Syndicate	2002	2006	2010	2014	2018	2022
Union syndicale des magistrats (USM)	67,0%	64,3%	62,2%	72,5%	70,0%	66,7%
Syndicat de la magistrature (SM)	29,5%	27,2%	31,8%	27,5%	30,0%	33,3%
Unité Magistrats	3,3%	8,5%	5,8%	0,0%	0,0%	0,0%
Other	0,2%	0,0%	0,1%	0,0%	0,0%	0,0%

== Administration ==
=== Budget ===
The Council's budget is part of program 335 of the "Justice" mission. In 2021, appropriations totaled 13,825,182 euros. Overheads account for a major share of operating expenses. They correspond mainly to the financing of rent and maintenance services for the Hôtel Moreau.

=== General secretaries ===
Formerly known as the "Administrative Secretary" until the Organic Law of July 22, 2010 on the application of Article 65 of the Constitution, the Secretary General of the Superior Council of the Judiciary is responsible for the Council's administrative and material operations, and manages the staff assigned to it. They are appointed by the President of the Republic on the joint recommendation of the First President of the Cour de Cassation and the Attorney General of the Cour de Cassation. Chosen from among magistrates with seven years' effective service, they are appointed for the duration of the term of office of the members of the Council, and may be reappointed once.

The General Secretary ensures the smooth running of the Council. To this end, they receive delegated signing authority from the First President of the Cour de cassation, who is the secondary authorizing officer for expenditure. Under the authority of the Presidents, they contribute to the organization of the Council's work, to which they provide assistance. They prepare working sessions (agenda, information gathering, operational monitoring of appointment and disciplinary procedures), take part in the Council's internal discussions, and implement and monitor decisions. Working full-time within the institution, this position is the point of contact for the courts, magistrates, other institutions and third parties.

=== List of administrative and general secretaries (from 2011) ===
- 1947-1958: Marc Granie
- 1958-1959: Yves Michel
- 1959-1965: Pierre Chabrand
- 1965-1969: Jacques Patin
- 1970-1974: Simone Veil
- 1974-1975: Paul Fouret
- 1975-1977: Hubert Haenel
- 1977-1978: Jean-François Burgelin
- 1978: Jean-Pierre Gilbert
- 1979-1981: Nicole Pradain
- 1981: Vincent Lamanda
- 1981-1992: Danièle Burguburu
- 1992-1994: Paule Dayan
- 1994-1995: Thierry Ricard
- 1995-1996: Frédérique Bozzi
- 1996-1998: Philippe Jean-Draeher
- 1998-2006: Marthe Coront-Ducluzeau
- 2006-2010: Catherine Pautrat
- 2011-2015: Peimane Ghaleh-Marzban
- 2015-2019: Daniel Barlow
- 2019-2023: Sophie Rey
- since 2023: Xavier Serrier

== Activities of the Council ==
=== Nominations ===
The tables below show the number of magistrate appointments for 2022 (figures as of November 1).

Power of proposal of the seat formation
Posts	Propositions
First President of the Court of Cassation	1
Presidents of chamber at the Court of Cassation	3
French Supreme Court Councillors	19
Legal advisors to the Court of Cassation	8
Auditors at the Cour de cassation	2
First Presidents of Courts of Appeal	9
Presidents of judicial courts	31

Of the 1,532 cases referred to it by judges, the Council issued 6 unfavorable opinions; of the 630 cases referred to it by public prosecutors, the Council issued 2 unfavorable opinions, which were followed by the Minister of Justice.

=== Discipline ===
As of November 1, 2022, the Council had received 280 complaints from individuals. Of these 280 complaints, 6 were declared admissible, 3 of which were subsequently rejected as unfounded. In this regard, the Council points out that "many litigants make misdirected requests, the handling of which does not fall within the Council's powers (requests for legal advice, the award of damages, intervention in ongoing proceedings, criminal prosecution, etc. ) or concern persons for whom the Council is not materially competent (lawyers, bailiffs, legal experts, notaries, educators, probation officers, industrial tribunal members, administrative judges, consular judges, court clerks, public prosecutors, police officers, etc.)".

As at November 1, 2022, the Council had received 10 disciplinary cases. The Council's disciplinary activity gave rise to nine decisions for the judiciary and three opinions for the public prosecutor's office.
