= National Alliance for Life Sciences and Health =

The National Alliance for Life Sciences and Health is a thematic research alliance in France created on April 8, 2009, as part of the National Strategy for Research and Innovation (SNRI), which identified health, food, and biotechnology as one of its three priority development areas.

== Missions ==
Aviesan works exclusively in the fields of life sciences and health.

Aviesan's stated objective is "to further enhance the performance of French research by promoting its coherence, creativity and excellence. This mission calls for scientific coordination of major research themes that cut across all organizations, and operational coordination of projects, resources and means".

== Achievements ==
In 2009, Aviesan coordinated research to find a vaccine against the H1-N12 virus.

In 2011, Aviesan provides a report and recommendations to the government following the Fukushima nuclear accident.

In 2020, Aviesan coordinates French research to find a vaccine against the COVID-19 coronavirus.

== Presidents ==
- André Syrota (2009-2014)
- Yves Levy (2014-2018)
- Claire Giry (2018-2019)
- Gilles Bloch (since 2019)
