= Tetaz =

Tetaz or Tétaz may refer to:

- Eve Tetaz (born 1931), American retired school teacher, and activist
- François Tétaz (born 1970), Australian musician
- Jacques-Martin Tétaz (1818–1865), French architect
- Martín Tetaz (born 1974), Argentine economist and politician
- Nahuel Tetaz Chaparro (born 1989), Argentine rugby player
