= Superior Council of the Judiciary =

Superior Council of the Judiciary may refer to:

- Superior Council of the Judiciary (France)
- Superior Council of the Judiciary (Mozambique)
- High Council of the Judiciary (Italy)
- Superior Council of Judicature (Columbia)
- High Council of Justice (Belgium)
- Council of the judiciary- European national judicial councils
