= Aissa Doumara Ngatansou =

Cameroonian activist

- Born: c. 1972; North Region, Cameroon
- Occupation: Women's rights activist
- Organization: Association for the Elimination of Violence Against Women (ALVF)
- Known for: Campaigning against gender-based violence, child marriage and forced marriage
- Awards: Simone Veil Prize (2019)

Aissa Doumara Ngatansou (born circa 1972) is a Cameroonian activist. In 2019, she won the Simone Veil prize.

== Life ==
Doumara Ngatansou is from the northern region of Cameroon. Her mother died when she was 11 years old, She was 15 years old when her father and her family decided to marry her to a man they had chosen without her consent. After getting married, she decided to continue her studies. Her husband's family opposed her decision, but she stood firm. Over time, her husband became more understanding.

After finishing secondary school, she worked with other women to start an association in the city of Maroua to support women and girls who suffer violence. She co-founded a branch of the Association for the Elimination of Violence Against Women (ALVF). ALVF has been providing relief, livelihood and psychosocial support to women and girls affected by the Boko Haram insurgency in the region.

She is an expert in gender and violence against girls and women. She is a programme coordinator with the Association to Combat Violence Against Girls and Women in the Far North Region of Cameroon and a member of the steering committee for the project ‘We are the solution - let us celebrate women’s role in small-scale farming’ run by the NGO FAHAMU.

== Awards ==
Aissa Doumara Ngatansou won France's inaugural Simone Veil Prize for helping victims of rape and forced marriage. Nganasou said she is dedicating the award to all female victims of violence and forced marriage and survivors of the Nigerian militant group Boko Haram.
