= Denise Vernay =

French resistance fighter (1924–2013)

Denise Vernay-Jacob
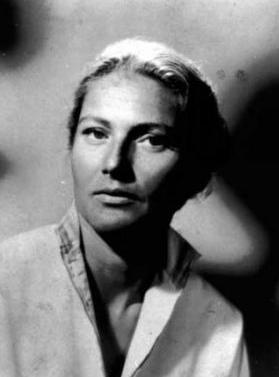
- Denise Jacob, c. 1944
- Born: Denise Jacob; 21 June 1924; Paris, French Third Republic
- Died: 4 March 2013 (aged 88); Paris, France
- Other name: Miarka or Annie
- Years active: 1941–1944
- Known for: French Resistance courier
- Spouse: Alain Vernay (m. 1947)
- Children: 3
- Parent(s): André Jacob; Yvonne Steinmetz
- Relatives: Simone Veil (sister)
- Awards: Commandeur de la Légion d'honneur Grand'croix de l'ordre national du Mérite; Croix de Guerre 1939–1945 avec palms Médaille de la Résistance avec rosette

Denise Vernay-Jacob (21 June 1924 – 4 March 2013) was a member of the French Resistance during World War II, who operated under the aliases of "Miarka" and "Annie" from 1941. She narrowly avoided the March 1944 roundup of Jews in Nice, France which resulted in the deportation of her parents to Auschwitz concentration camp in occupied Poland. Captured less than three months later, she survived torture by the Gestapo and imprisonment at two Nazi concentration camps – Ravensbrück and Mauthausen. She was rescued by the Red Cross in April 1945 and returned home to France at the conclusion of the war.

Although her sisters, Madeleine and Simone, survived imprisonment elsewhere, their parents and brother did not. Vernay-Jacob helped to establish the Fondation de la Résistance to provide support to survivors of the war and honor the memories of those who had perished – efforts which she continued to support throughout her life. Her sister Simone Veil became the first president of the Fondation pour la Mémoire de la Shoah. Vernay-Jacob was honored with multiple awards for her valor.

== Formative years ==
Born in Paris, France, on 21 June 1924 as Denise Jacob, she was a daughter of French Jewish architect André Jacob and his wife, Yvonne Jacob (née Steinmetz), who had given up her chemistry studies to begin her family. The second of four children, she moved with her parents and sister, Madeleine (born in 1922 and also known as "Snowy"), to Nice later in 1924 after her father received a promising business offer. Her younger brother, Jean, and sister, Simone Annie Liline, were born in 1925 and on 13 July 1927, respectively.

The family's financial situation changed, however, as the Great Depression took hold across France in 1931. By 1932, their parents made the decision to exchange the family's villa for an apartment in Nice.

== World War II ==
The Fall of France in the summer of 1940 led to the arrival of the Gestapo in Nice on September 9 and the enactment that autumn of the law on the status of Jews by the French Vichy Government. These events made daily life even more precarious for the Jacob family. The October 1940 Statut prepared by Raphaël Alibert "embraced the definition of a Jew established in the Nuremberg Laws", and deprived Jewish people of their civil rights, including the right to work. As a result, Andrè Jacob lost his job. Sixteen-year-old Denise became a mathematics tutor to help support her family. She also became more involved in the Girl Scouts, a source of freedom and hope for her – as well as the source of her nickname, "Miarka," the pseudonym she would initially use as a courier for the French Resistance.

Our mother was the soul of the house. Family, school and scouting were the three centres of our lives, which weren’t easy but so full of tenderness, friendship and different activities. The war broke out in September 1939. In May 1940 came the German invasion, the flow of refugees, the rout of our troops even though some of them were valiantly grouped together at certain defence sites, the debacle, Pétain’s quavering voice, the armistice, occupation and collaboration. I refused to believe that it was final, that our British allies had become our enemies overnight.

In 1941, Denise Jacob performed her first acts of resistance, distributing anti-fascist educational materials and listening to BBC Radio for news of the war, an activity which had been outlawed by the Vichy Government. The 17-year-old high school student then relayed that news to her teachers and classmates by posting it on blackboards at her school. While she was away at a cheerleading camp in September 1943, she received word from her family that it was too dangerous for her to return home to Nice, so she moved to a friend's home in Isère.

=== Joining the Resistance ===
During autumn 1943, Denise, now 19 years old, was encouraged to become a full-fledged member of the French Resistance by joining one of its cells in Lyon. Adopting her old scouting nickname, she entered the underground movement as "Miarka", received training, and then began clandestinely transporting resistance messages by bicycle. After seven months of this work, she was urged to leave Lyon for safety reasons.

Testifying in 1946 about her war-time experiences, she noted that her departure had been prompted by a wave of arrests of United Resistance Movement members. In an attempt to mask her appearance to facilitate her escape, she exchanged coats with one of her comrades, but preserved her sense of self by refusing to cut off her blonde braids.

Arriving in Nice on 18 March, in time for birthday celebrations for her older sister, she enjoyed only the briefest of reunions with her family before returning to Lyon. Ten days later, her parents, brother and two sisters were arrested in Nice as part of a roundup of Jewish residents, and sent to the internment camp at Drancy and then on to the Auschwitz-Birkenau concentration camp. She learned of their fate from a letter retrieved from the Lyon post office.

She then proceeded to immerse herself in the French Resistance as a member of Franc-tireur (not to be confused with the Francs-Tireurs et Partisans). The Franc-tireur movement had launched in Lyon as an outgrowth of a clandestine resistance newspaper established by Jean-Pierre Lévy. It was one of the major resistance efforts in the south of France at the time, along with Maverick, Combat and Liberation. As Franc-tireur and the other resistance efforts continued to expand in the south of France, their respective leaders decided to combine forces, and les Mouvements Unis de Résistance (also known as les MUR, "the United Resistance Movements") was born.

Now I asked to fight with weapons. The United Movements of Haute-Savoie were looking for a liaison agent. I left for Annecy in early April. I became "Annie" instead of "Miarka", my alias in Lyon. I bicycled through Annecy and the department with its varied relief. The maquis were nearby.

Inspired by the Allied landing on 6 June 1944, she chose, on 14 June, to serve as "an agent liaison for the Secret Army, which held the Glières Plateau with the F.T.P. (Francs-Tireurs et Partisans)".

A parachute drop fell in Saône-et-Loire and it was necessary to pick up two radio transmitters and their equipment, a large amount of money, and two suitcases containing the personal belongings of the two men who had parachuted at the same time: the head of the Secret Army, "Cantinier", and an American observer, "Niveau." I volunteered.

Bicycling 240 km to Cluny on 14 June and then to the Saône-et-Loire maquis command post at Brançion on 16 June, she recovered the supplies, and took a taxi to a friend's home in Caluire. Moving on the next day, she headed for the Aix-les-Bains railway station, where she planned to drop the suitcases at the lost luggage area, but she never made it. As her taxi reached a "Feldgendarmerie roadblock between Bourgoin and La Tour du Pin, halfway from [her] goal," she and her driver were subjected to what, for most other travelers, would have been a routine search. When the police discovered what she was transporting, they arrested her.

=== Imprisonment at Ravensbrück and Mauthausen ===
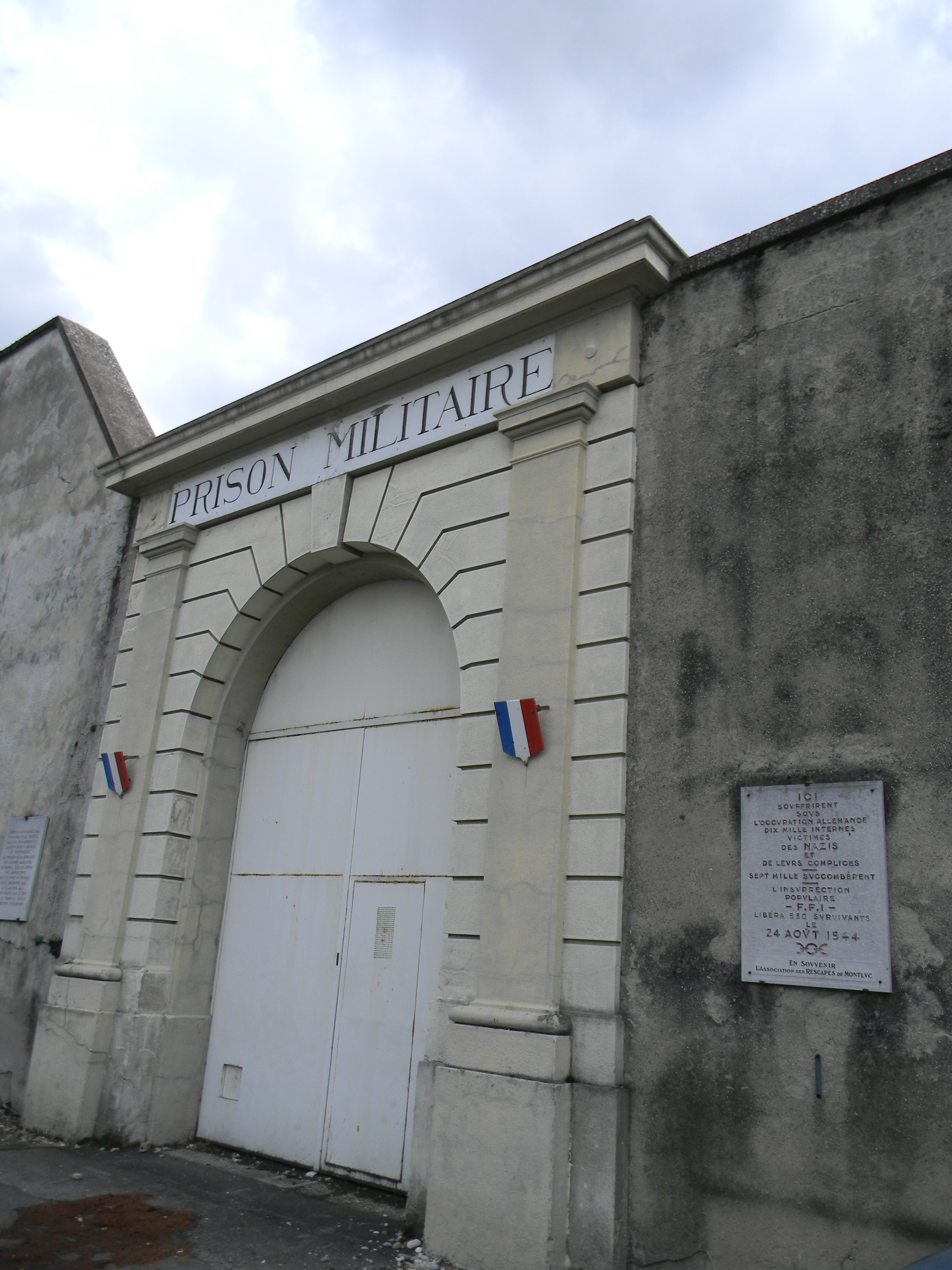
Montluc military prison, Lyon, 2011

Following her arrest at the roadblock, Denise Jacob was transferred to the custody of the Geheime Staatspolizei, the Nazi Secret State Police unit more commonly known as the Gestapo. At this point, she was still known by her alias "Annie."

I was handed over to the Gestapo in Lyon: a grueling interrogation (the bathtub) in Place Bellecour, 10 days in Montluc fort, 10 days of transit to Romainville fort and then Ravensbrück on 26 July. I was registered in convoy no. 46,800. On 2 March 1945 I left Ravensbrück for Mauthausen in a night and fog (N. N.) convoy that also transported gypsies.

"The torture of the bathtub," according to historian Jacques Delarue, would have involved "plunging the patient into a bath of icy water ... hands handcuffed behind [the] back, and keeping [the victim's] head under water until [she] was on the point of drowning." Denise Jacob would then have been "dragged to the surface by the hair and, if [she] still refused to speak [would have been] immediately plunged under water again." Often, "when the patient was on the point of losing consciousness," he or she would be revived by the Gestapo agent with coffee or brandy before the torture session was resumed.

The methods employed to make the victims talk were always the same. They were forced to kneel on a triangular bench while a torturer climbed on their shoulders; they were suspended with the arms tied behind their backs until they fainted; they were kicked, thrased with knouts, or struck with the fist; they were revived by flinging a bucket of water over them when they fainted. Their teeth were filed, their nails torn out, and they were burned with cigarette stubs and on occasions with a soldering lamp. The electric torture was also practiced.... The soles of the feet were slashed with a razor.... Women were not exempt from these tortures, and it was usually upon them that the torturers used their most odious refinements....

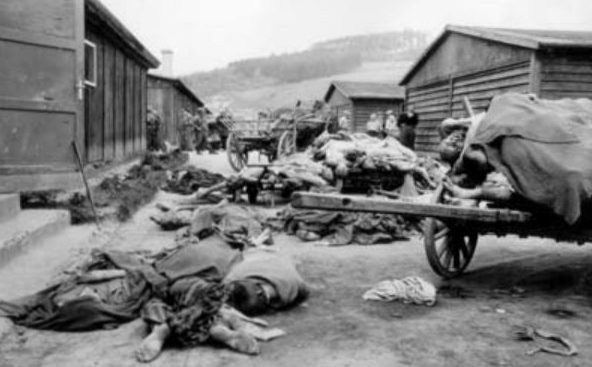
Prisoners' corpses discovered by U.S. soldiers, Mauthausen, May 8, 1945.

Despite this brutal treatment, she did not break, and never revealed the names of her Resistance associates. Her former supervisor, Georges Guidollet-Ostier, was so confident about her ability to withstand whatever her tormentors did to her that he declined to change his alias or address. Deported to Mauthausen with 2,000 other women under the secretive Nacht und Nebel ("night and fog") program, she was targeted for extermination. Before the Nazi Schutzstaffel (SS) could carry out her execution, however, she and other members of her group were saved by International Red Cross delegates who pressured camp personnel to free the women. Transported from the camp in white Red Cross trucks on 21 April 1945, they were taken to St. Gallen, Switzerland, where they were housed briefly before being moved to Haute-Savoie via Geneva and Annemasse.

Denise Jacob (aka "Annie") arrived back in Annecy just as the war was ending. She was greeted by fellow Resistance member Adrien Galliot, who introduced her to Jean Massendes, France's new Secretary General. He and his wife, Odette, reportedly then welcomed her into their home. Afterward, she stayed at the Imperial Hotel on the lake, which had been requisitioned by the government as housing for former deportees. After rest and recuperation, she was able to locate an aunt and uncle, who told her that her parents and brother had been killed in the Holocaust, and that her two sisters, who had both survived Auschwitz and Bergen-Belsen, had contracted typhus, and were in extremely poor condition.

Her sisters, Madeleine and Simone, who had been imprisoned initially with their mother at the Auschwitz concentration camp in Occupied Poland, had been separated from her when she was transferred to the Nazi's Bergen-Belsen concentration camp in Germany, where she died from typhus on 15 March 1945, just prior to that camp's liberation. Their father and brother, who had been deported to Lithuania by convoy number 73, were never found.

On 23 August 1946, Denise Jacob testified about her experiences. Roughly translated from the original French, she said:

The pain, the cold, the hunger, the thirst, the lack of sleep, the insurmountable misery that is overcome, the body, except serious sequelae, forgets them in an unconscious space. The images that will remain forever: Those of thousands of women lined up by tens, standing in the cold or the heat, planted for hours waiting for the end-of-call siren, images of the more and more emaciated bodies of our companions, the unknown dead, image of a face absent from view, image of the superimposed bedsteads with the youngest at the top, and the least mobile, older; downstairs, sharing two or three depending on the time a straw mattress 70 cm wide. There remain the faces, the silhouettes of those who have not returned. They have not aged with us. There are also the images of the immense sky beyond our interminable calls.

== Post-war life ==
After the war, Denise Jacob's eldest sister, Madeleine, became a source of comfort and stability as she assumed the position of matriarch of the surviving Jacob sisters, all three of whom soon married. In 1947, Denise wed Alain Vernay (born Alain Weill) (1918–2015), who went on to become a leader in the field of economic journalism after being hired by the French newspaper Le Figaro in 1969.

Her happiness was short-lived, however. In 1952, she lost her second "mother" when Madeleine was killed in a car accident.

Over time, memories of Denise Vernay-Jacob's heroism and that of other female French Resistance fighters gradually began to fade among members of the general public, a collective forgetting which had its genesis in the failure of French leaders to publicly acknowledge women's wartime contributions. General Charles deGaulle decorated only six women for valor while choosing to celebrate the activities of 1,036 men.

According to her longtime friend, Jeannine Guidollet, Vernay-Jacob "was able to create a family, have children and, for those who did not know her story ... became simply 'Madame Vernay," a modest woman who "spoke little of what she had experienced [and who] demanded the utmost discretion from all those around her." One of the organizers of the Foundation of the Memory of the Deportation, she collaborated with Geneviève de Gaulle-Anthonioz, Marie-Jose Chombart de Lauwe and Annie Postel-Vinay to support former deportees, preserve memories of the fallen, and "perpetuate the memory of the Resistance to all forms of oppression".

Meanwhile, her younger sister, Simone Veil, opted for a far more public life, becoming France's Minister of Health from 1974 to 1979 under Valéry Giscard d'Estaing, President of the European Parliament and member of the Constitutional Council of France. In 1973 and 1975, she played key roles in France's legalization of contraception and abortion.

In 2007, she and her sister were photographed together at a World War II commemoration event in Nice. The next year, Vernay-Jacob strongly criticized the film, Les Femmes de l’Ombre (Women of the Shadows), for its portrayal of female members of the French Resistance. "This film is worse than if they had done nothing," she told a reporter from The Sunday Telegraph. "I am very sorry that it was made at all, especially at a time when those generations watching it who did not know the war can no longer differentiate between the reality of our commitment and these ridiculous women portrayed in the film. Women joined the Resistance out of patriotism, a conviction which appears nowhere in this film." Adding that it was a "betrayal of their memory to say they were recruited by blackmail, lies and pardons," she noted, "Such recruitment, carried out in haste, is implausible, even impossible."

== Death ==
Vernay-Jacob went on to live a long, full life. She died at the age of 88 in Paris, France, on 4 March 2013.

Just over two years later, her husband, Alain Vernay, died at home at the age of 97 on 12 August 2015 and was buried at the Montparnasse Cemetery in Paris. His obituary in Le Figaro noted that the happiest years of his life were those spent with his wife. They were survived by three children, seven grandchildren and four great-grandchildren.

The remains of her sister, Simone Veil, who was also interred at Montparnasse following her death in 2017, were exhumed and reinterred on 1 July 2018 in the Panthéon after thousands of French citizens petitioned their government to recognize her service to the nation with reburial there (only the fifth woman in history to be accorded this honor).

== Awards ==
Denise Vernay-Jacob was accorded multiple awards for valor, post-war, in recognition of her service with the French Resistance during World War II. These honors included:

- Commandeur de la Légion d'honneur (Legion of Honor);
- Grand'croix de l'ordre national du Mérite (French National Order of Merit);
- Croix de guerre 1939–1945 avec palmes (War Cross 1939–1945 with palm); and
- Médaille de la Résistance avec rosette (Medal of the Resistance with Officers' Rosette), French Committee of National Liberation.

== See also ==
- Vichy anti-Jewish legislation
