= Antoine Veil =

French entrepreneur, politician, and high-ranking civil servant (1926–2013)

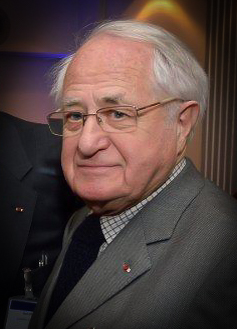

Councillor of Paris
- In office 1971–1989
- Mayor: Jacques Chirac

Personal details
- Born: 28 August 1926 Blâmont, France
- Died: 12 April 2013 (aged 86) Paris, France
- Resting place: Panthéon
- Spouse: Simone Veil (m. 1946)
- Children: 3, including Pierre-François
- Education: Sciences Po, ÉNA
- Profession: Civil servant

Antoine Victor Veil (French pronunciation: [ɑ̃twan vɛj], 28 August 1926 – 12 April 2013) was a French entrepreneur, politician, high-ranking civil servant, and the husband of Simone Veil.

== Biography ==
=== Early years ===
Veil was born on 28 August 1926 in Blâmont, Meurthe-et-Moselle, to André Veil (1889-1966), an industrialist and cotton fabric manufacturer, and Alice Léon (1898-1985), a housewife.

Of Lorraine Jewish origin, he ‘narrowly escaped deportation’. He and his family fled to Switzerland during World War II.

On 26 October 1946, Veil married Simone Jacob, who took the name Simone Veil. They had three sons: Jean (born 1947), Claude-Nicolas (1948-2002) and Pierre-François (born 1954), a lawyer.

After attending the lycée in Nancy and Grenoble, Veil went on to study at university, graduating with a law degree and a diploma from Sciences Po in Paris in 1948. He later taught there, succeeding future President Georges Pompidou as a law professor.

=== Professional career ===
Veil joined the cabinet of minister Pierre-Henri Teitgen in 1947 and the cabinet of Alain Poher in 1948. After graduating from the ENA in 1955, he joined the corps of finance inspectors and continued his career in various ministerial cabinets: he became chief of staff to Joseph Fontanet, Secretary of State for Industry and Trade, and then Minister for Public Health. From 1964 to 1968, he was General Delegate of the Central Committee of French Shipowners, now named Armateurs de France. In 1969, he was appointed Deputy Managing Director of the Compagnie des Chargeurs réunis.

From 1971 to 1980, he was a director and then Chief Executive Officer of the airline UTA, Chairman and Chief Executive Officer of Compagnie aéromaritime d'affrètement and a director of Air Inter. He was a member of the strategy committee of the Bolloré Group.

He was elected to the Council of Paris in 1971 and re-elected in 1977 and 1983, serving until 1989, and served on the Regional Council of Île-de-France from 1976 to 1986.

When Simone Veil introduced the 1975 Veil Act that decriminalized abortion, Antoine Veil, who served as treasurer of the Centre of Social Democrats, was privately involved in the drafting process and made his network of centrist politicians available to his wife to get it through parliament. As his wife gained national and European political prominence, he found it difficult to be seen as little more than her husband, at a time when the tendency was for couples in which one member was involved in politics to be in the opposite situation.

From 1982 to 1985, Veil was the CEO of the firearm manufacturer Manurhin.

In 1983, Veil and his wife founded the Club Vauban, a think-tank aimed at overcoming political divisions, with meetings held in their apartment on the Place Vauban in Paris.

In 1989, he founded a consulting firm, AV Consultants.

Veil was appointed CEO of Orlyval in April 1992. Faced with the company's difficulties, he negotiated a restructuring plan that led to the concession being taken over by RATP a few months later.

== Honours and awards ==
- Grand Officier of the Order of Legion of Honour
- Commandeur of the Ordre National du Mérite
- Officier of the Ordre de la Santé publique
- Officer of the Ordre du Mérite commercial et industriel (Order of Commercial and Industrial Merit)
- Officer of the Order of Agricultural Merit
- Knight of the Ordre de l'économie Nationale (Order of National Economy)

== Death and tribute ==
Following the death of Simone on 30 June 2017, President Emmanuel Macron announced on 5 July that she would be admitted to the Panthéon during a state funeral. Antoine Veil was admitted with her in his capacity as her husband. He is the second spouse to enter the Panthéon in this capacity, after Sophie Berthelot. The ceremony took place on 1 July 2018.
