= Union syndicale des magistrats =

Largest French magistrates' trade union

The Union syndicale des magistrats (USM) is the largest and most influential trade union representing judges of the judicial order in France.

Founded in 1974 by André Braunschweig, it represents approximately 2,800 magistrates out of around 9,000 in the French judiciary system. The USM consistently wins the majority of votes in professional elections to the Conseil supérieur de la magistrature (Superior Council of the Judiciary), securing roughly two-thirds of suffrages in recent elections (66.7% in 2022, approximately 61% in February 2026). Unlike its rival the Syndicat de la Magistrature, which is known for expressing left-wing views and opposition to conservative policies, the USM claims an apolitical and non-partisan positioning.
