= Agnès Buzyn =

French physician, academic, civil servant and politician

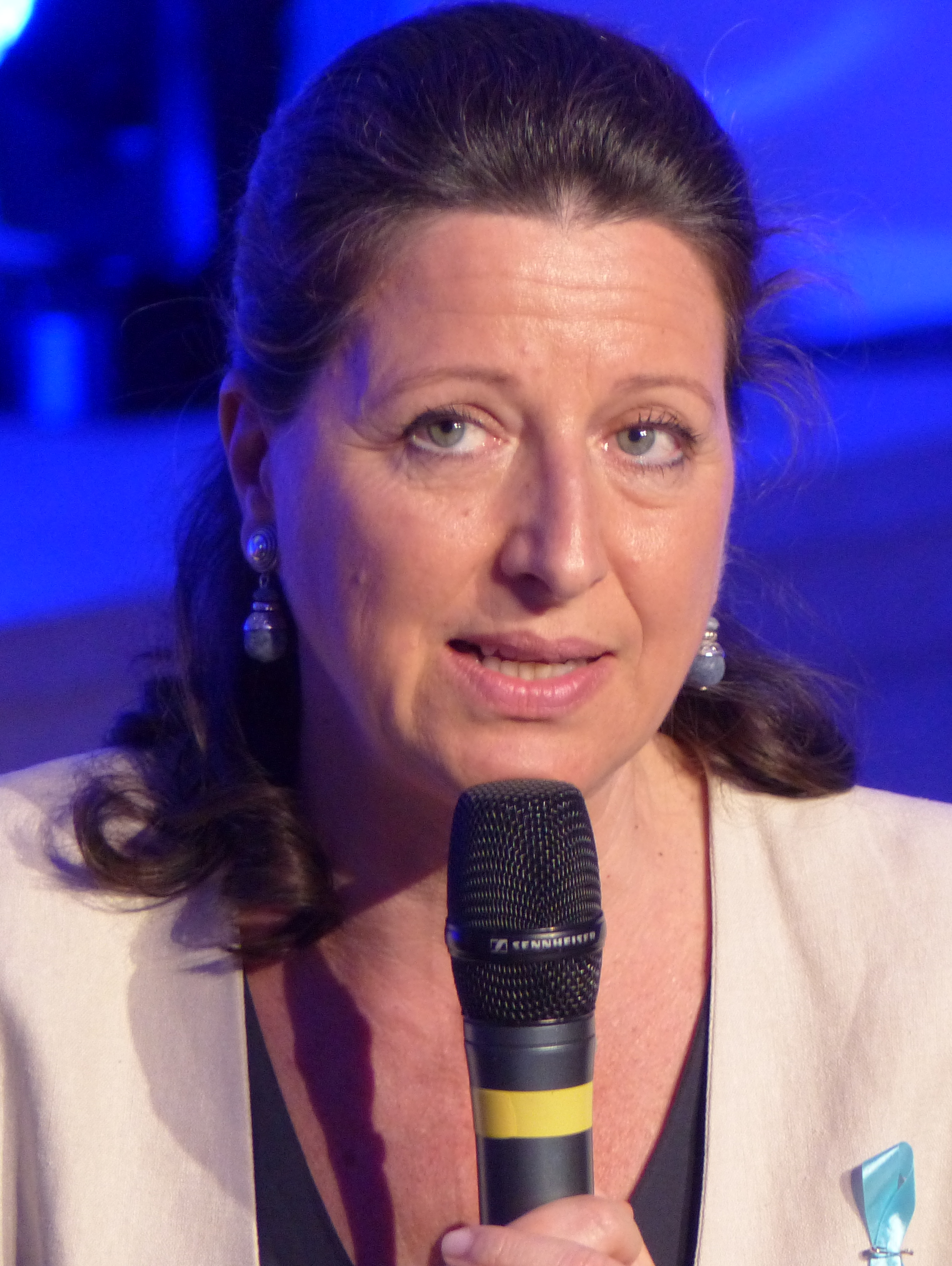
- Buzyn in 2018

Minister of Solidarity and Health
- In office 17 May 2017 – 16 February 2020
- Prime Minister: Édouard Philippe
- Preceded by: Marisol Touraine
- Succeeded by: Olivier Véran

Personal details
- Born: 1 November 1962 (age 63) Paris, France
- Party: La République En Marche! (2017–present)
- Other political affiliations: Independent (before 2017)
- Spouse(s): Pierre-François Veil (divorced); Yves Lévy
- Children: 3
- Education: Paris Descartes University

Agnès Buzyn (French pronunciation: [aɲɛs byzɛ̃]; born 1 November 1962) is a French hematologist, university professor, medical practitioner and politician who served as minister of Solidarity and Health in the government of Prime Minister Édouard Philippe from May 2017 to February 2020. A member of La République En Marche! (LREM), she was its candidate for Mayor of Paris in the 2020 election but failed to reach the second round.

Buzyn, who specialises in hematology, cancer immunology and transplant, spent most of her career as a medical practitioner, professor and researcher at Paris Descartes University (Paris-V) and Necker–Enfants Malades Hospital.

From 2008, Buzyn assumed many responsibilities as part of health and nuclear public institutions: president of the administrative counsel of the Radioprotection and Nuclear Safety Institute (IRSN; French: Institut de radioprotection et de sûreté nucléaire; 2008–2013); member of the committee on nuclear energy of the Alternative Energies and Atomic Energy Commission (CEA; Commissariat à l'énergie atomique et aux énergies alternatives; 2009–2015); member of the administrative counsel in 2009, then vice-president in 2010, as well as president from 2011 of the National Institute for Cancer (INCa; Institut national du cancer).

Buzyn was appointed minister of Solidarity and Health under the presidency of Emmanuel Macron, as part of the first government of Édouard Philippe on 17 May 2017. She kept the position on 21 June 2017 as part of the Philippe's second government. She resigned on 16 February 2020 to run in the Paris mayoral election, in which she placed third. She was elected health minister, succeeded by Olivier Véran.

== Early life and education ==
Buzyn was born to two Holocaust survivors, her father Elie from Polish Łódź, who survived Buchenwald's death march at age 16, and left for British Palestine after World War II. He became an orthopedic surgeon in Paris and married a French Jewish woman, Etty, whose family hid in France during the war; she became a well-known psychoanalyst and writer.

== Early career ==
Buzyn is a qualified doctor, hematologist and university professor. From 2008 to 2013, she chaired France's Agency for Nuclear Safety and Protection against Radiation (IRSN), a position which involved reassuring the public after Japan's Fukushima Daiichi nuclear disaster in 2011.

She has been head of the French National Cancer Institute and other public health executive boards. For several years she was a senior physician and researcher at the Necker Children's Hospital in Paris, teaching hematology and transplantation at Pierre and Marie Curie University (Paris-VI).

In 2016, Buzyn was appointed president of the High Health Authority (HAS), as the first woman.

== Political career ==
=== Minister of Health, 2017–2020 ===
In May 2017, President Emmanuel Macron appointed Buzyn as health minister. She had never been involved in party politics prior to being nominated similar to other ministers (Culture Minister Françoise Nyssen, Sports Ministers Laura Flessel and Ecology Minister Nicolas Hulot).

Early in her tenure, Buzyn signed a charter to promote vaccination with seven national health service guilds, in an effort to counter growing vaccine hesitancy in France. In 2019, she implemented a HAS recommendation according to which the state health insurance system cease all reimbursements for the use of homeopathic cures from 2021. She later steered through parliament a controversial bioethics law extending to homosexual and single women free access to fertility treatments such as in vitro fertilisation (IVF) under France's national health insurance; it was one of the campaign promises of President Macron and marked the first major social reform of his five-year term.

During France's presidency of the G7 in 2019, Buzyn hosted a G7 Ministers of Health meeting in Paris. She also co-hosted the sixth replenishment meeting of the Global Fund to Fight AIDS, Tuberculosis and Malaria in Lyon.

Ahead of the 2019 European Parliament election in France, Buzyn was considered one of the front-runners to top the candidate list of the La République En Marche! party; the role eventually went to Nathalie Loiseau instead.

By the end of 2019, addressing concerns that France's free health system was attracting illegal migrants, Buzyn said asylum seekers would have to wait three months before being entitled to healthcare. She assured that restrictions would not apply to children, or emergency care.

=== Candidate for mayor of Paris, 2020 ===
In February 2020 Buzyn resigned to run as her party's candidate for mayor of Paris in the 2020 municipal election. She eventually received 17.7% of the vote, losing against incumbent Anne Hidalgo; former LREM politician Cédric Villani, a member of the National Assembly, headed a list that received 7.8% of the vote.

== Later career ==
In 2021, Buzyn was appointed by the World Health Organization's Director-General Tedros Adhanom Ghebreyesus as his envoy for relations with other multilateral organizations, succeeding Michèle Boccoz.

== Controversies ==
The minister of Health and minister of Research oversee the INSERM, where Yves Lévy, Buzyn's husband, was CEO at the time of her appointment. A controversy emerged as to whether Buzyn could effectively oversee an institution headed by her husband. On 29 May 2017, a decree was issued which stated the prime minister would carry out acts related to INSERM instead of Buzyn.

In January 2020, in the early stages of the COVID-19 pandemic, Buzyn caused controversy by calling temperature checks at airports "a symbol that is useless, except to please the population". In October 2020, she was one of several current and former government officials whose home was searched by the authorities following lawsuits about the government's handling of the COVID-19 pandemic in France. In September 2021, she was placed under investigation when prosecutors at a Paris court decided that there were grounds to prosecute her for "endangering the lives of others."

== Personal life ==
Buzyn was married to Pierre-François Veil, son of politician and Holocaust survivor Simone Veil, who died in June 2017. They have two children together.

Buzyn is married to Yves Lévy, with whom she has one child. Lévy is an immunology professor and has been heading the National Institute of Health and Medical Research (INSERM) since June 2014. He remains interim head since his term expired on 12 June 2018. He announced on 30 July that he would not run for another term, due to the controversy involving his wife.
