= Pierre-François Veil =

French lawyer and civil servant (1954–2026)

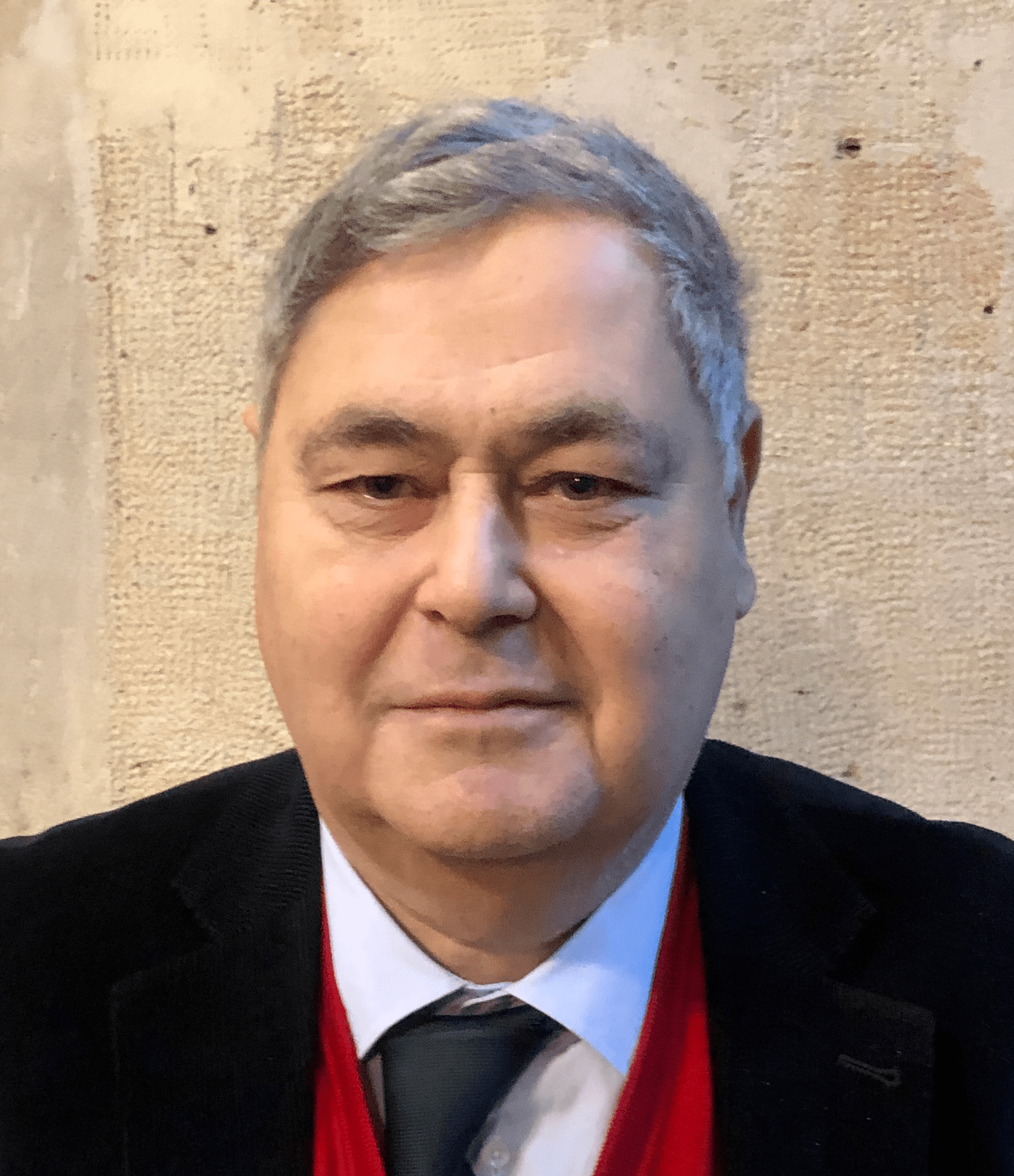
- Veil in 2023

President of the Fondation pour la Mémoire de la Shoah
- In office July 2023 – 6 May 2026
- Preceded by: David René de Rothschild
- Succeeded by: TBD

Personal details
- Born: 16 March 1954 Clichy, France
- Died: 6 May 2026 (aged 72)
- Relations: Antoine Veil (father); Simone Veil (mother)
- Education: École alsacienne Sciences Po; Paris 1 Panthéon-Sorbonne University; Paris-Panthéon-Assas University
- Occupation: Lawyer, civil servant

Pierre-François Veil (French: [pjɛʁ fʁɑ̃swa vɛj]; 16 March 1954 – 6 May 2026) was a French lawyer and civil servant.

== Life and career ==
Veil was born in Clichy on 16 March 1954 to Antoine Veil, an entrepreneur and politician, and Simone Veil, a politician and magistrate. He had two brothers: lawyer Jean Veil and doctor Claude-Nicolas Veil. After his secondary studies at the École alsacienne, he graduated from Sciences Po in 1976. He also earned a master of private law from Paris 1 Panthéon-Sorbonne University and a Diplôme d'études approfondies from Paris-Panthéon-Assas University and was admitted to the Paris Bar Association. During his career, he served on the steering committees of the Pasteur Institute and the Weizmann Institute of Science. From 2023 to 2026, he was president of the Fondation pour la Mémoire de la Shoah.

Veil married three times, including to politician Agnès Buzyn from 1985 to 1999; he had four children from these three marriages. His son, Lucas, notably married Nelly Auteuil in 2018, who was the daughter of Daniel Auteuil and Emmanuelle Béart. During the tribute to his mother's death, he spoke alongside his brother, Jean, and President Emmanuel Macron. She was laid to rest at Montparnasse Cemetery alongside her husband, Antoine.

Veil died on 6 May 2026, at the age of 72.

== Decorations ==
- Officer of the Legion of Honour (2010)
