= Hôtel Moreau =

18th-century French hôtel particulier in Paris

- Hôtel Lakanal
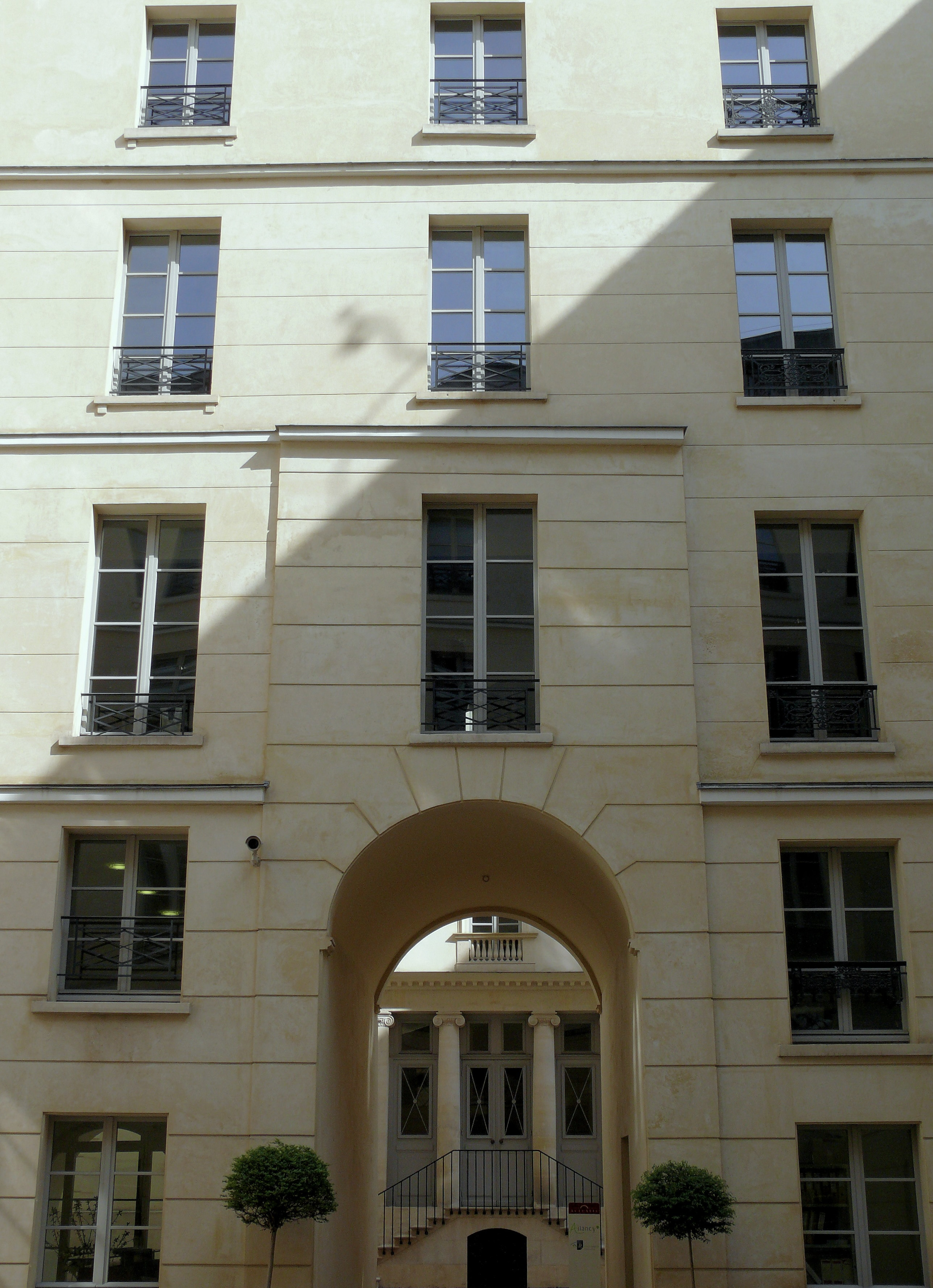
- Location: 20, Rue de la Chaussée-d'Antin, 9th arrondissement of Paris, Île-de-France, France
- Coordinates: 48°52′20″N 2°20′01″E
- Designer: François-Nicolas Trou dit Henry
- Type: Hôtel particulier
- Beginning date: 1797
- Completion date: 1797
- Current use: Conseil supérieur de la magistrature

The Hôtel Moreau, formerly known as Hôtel Lakanal, is an 18th-century hôtel particulier (grand townhouse) located in Paris, France.

== Location and access ==
The Hotel Moreau is situated at 20, Rue de la Chaussée-d'Antin, in the 9th arrondissement of Paris. Since 2013, it has served as the headquarters of the Conseil supérieur de la magistrature.

== History ==
Constructed in 1797 by architect François-Nicolas Trou dit Henry for Joseph Lakanal, a former member of the National Convention and the Council of Five Hundred, the hôtel played a significant role in French history. It was the site where the Coup of 18 Brumaire was planned. It remains unclear whether Trou also designed the adjacent buildings at numbers 18 to 22, for which a building permit was issued to a Mr. Bonin in 1790.

The hôtel exemplifies Directoire style neoclassicism, designed as an isolated two-story pavilion. Its entrance features a distinctive portico with an Ionic order lacking bases. A double perron leads to the entrance, sheltered by a small peristyle composed of two columns and two pilasters. The façade is enlivened by horizontal bands and a frieze of metopes beneath the cornice. The circular salon is decorated in the First Empire style.

On the garden side, the façade centers on a rotunda corresponding to the salon. An adjacent building in the courtyard, constructed between 1801 and 1802, may be the work of architect and draftsman Jean-Jacques Lequeu, known for his extravagant designs. This wing is referred to as the "Lequeu wing."

In the mid-19th century, the hotel and its wing were raised by two additional stories, and their façades were modified.

In 1977, 400 sculpted fragments from the façade of Notre-Dame de Paris, including the heads of the Kings of Judah statues, were discovered in the hôtel's courtyard. Mistaken for statues of the Kings of France and destroyed by sans-culottes during the French Revolution, these fragments were hidden by Jean-Baptiste Lakanal, Joseph's brother. They are now displayed at the Musée national du Moyen Âge.

The hotel was owned by General Moreau (1763–1813), who gave it his name during his residency from 1799 to 1801.

In 1958, the Banque française du commerce extérieur acquired the property. Since 2013, it has been the headquarters of the Conseil supérieur de la magistrature, previously located at the Palais de l'Alma.

The building is listed as a monument historique for:

- The First Empire style decoration of the circular salon (since October 19, 1927)
- The façades and roofs of the hotel (since December 30, 1977)
- Several interior rooms (since July 8, 2003)

== Gallery ==
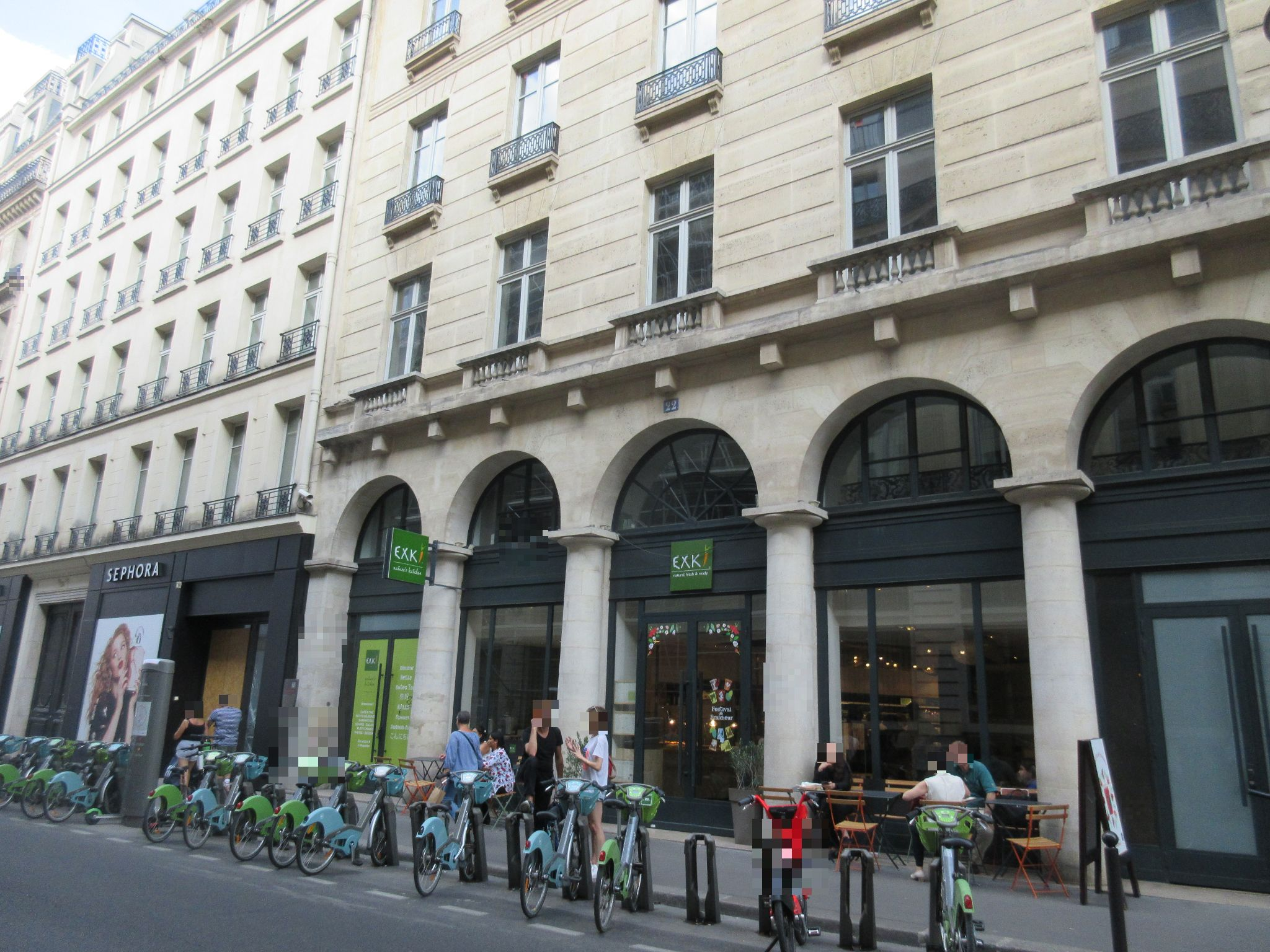

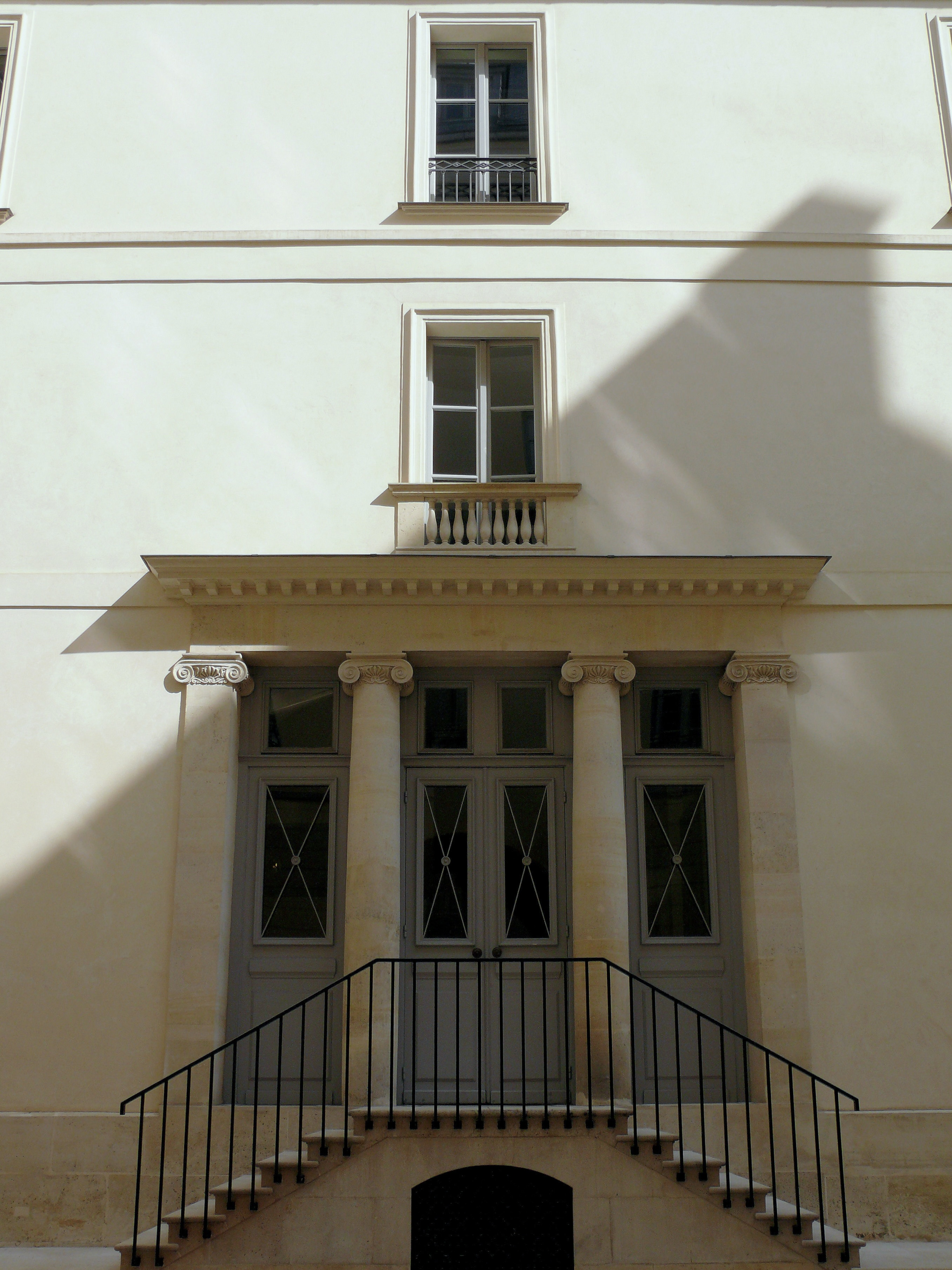

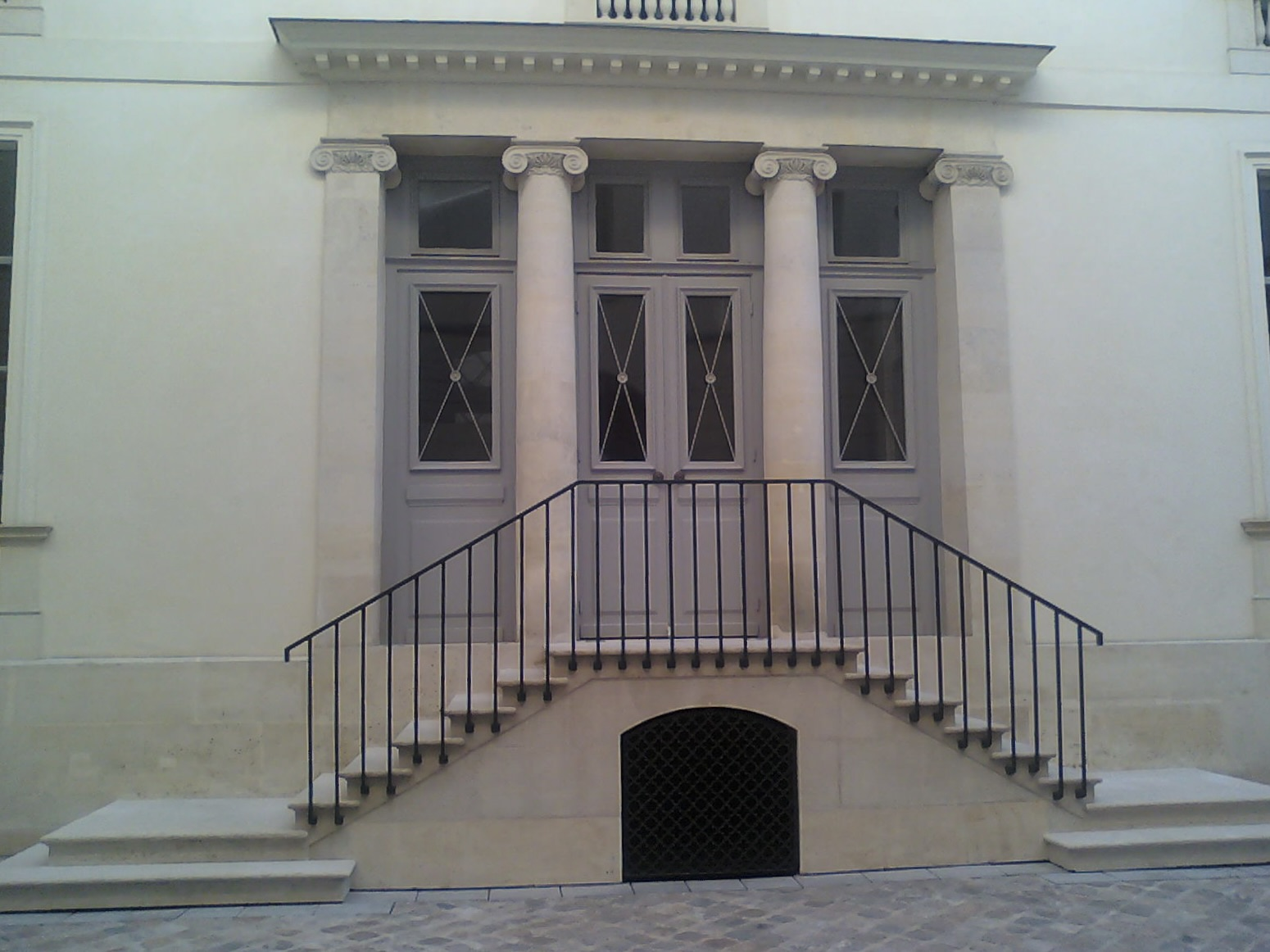

== See also ==
- List of hôtels particuliers in Paris
- Directoire style
- Coup of 18 Brumaire
- Joseph Lakanal
- Jean Victor Marie Moreau
- Musée de Cluny

== Bibliography ==
- Goldemberg, Maryse (1997). Guide du promeneur 9e arrondissement [Guide to the 9th Arrondissement] (in French). Paris: Parigramme. ISBN 978-2-84096-060-7.
- Montclos, Jean-Marie Perouse de (1994). Paris: le guide du patrimoine [Paris: the heritage guide] (in French). Direction du patrimoine, CNMHS. p. 587.
