= Simone Veil =

French politician (1927–2017)

Simone Veil DBE
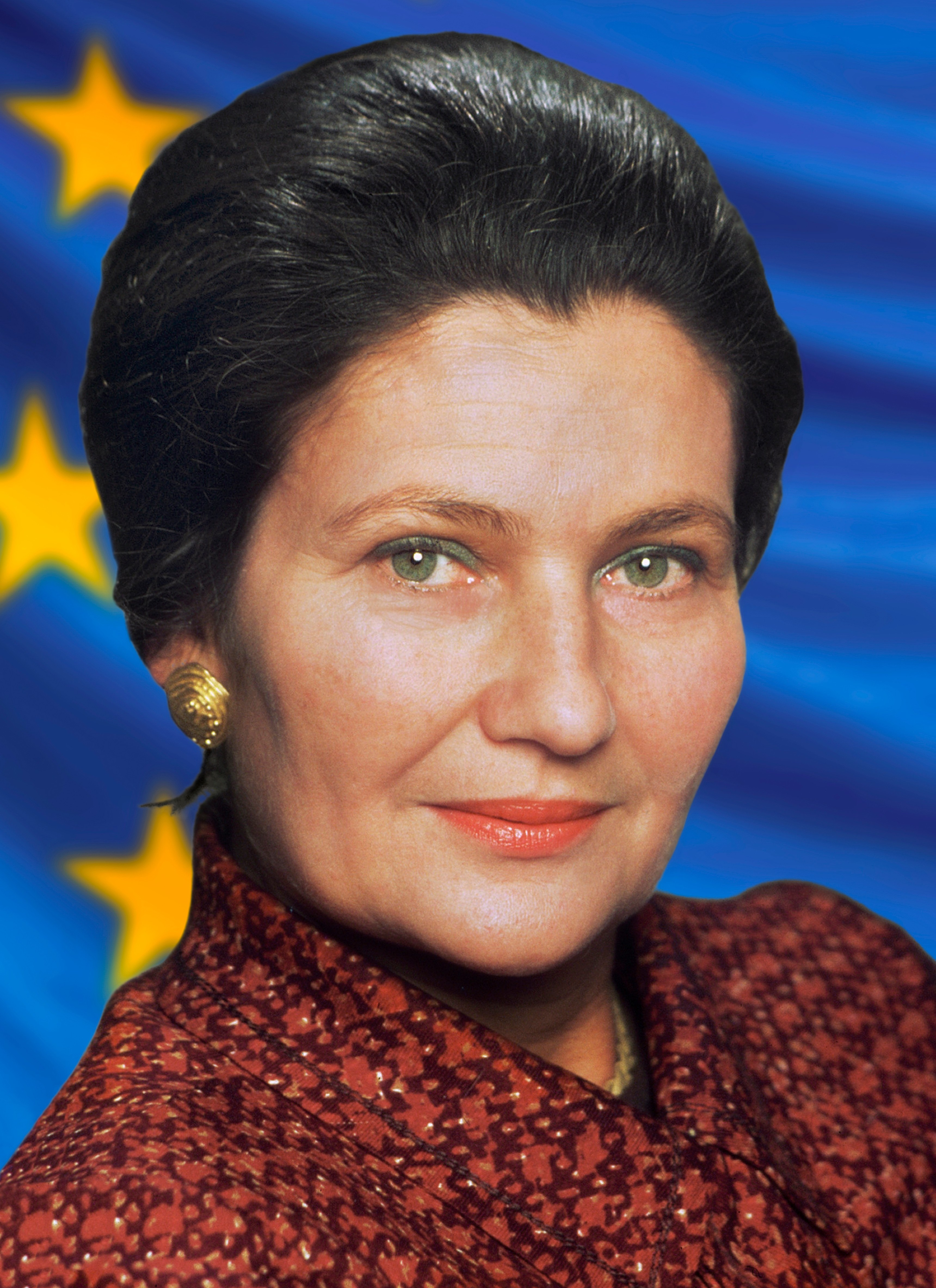
- Veil in 1982

Member of the Constitutional Council
- In office 3 March 1998 – 3 March 2007
- Appointed by: René Monory
- President: Roland Dumas; Yves Guéna; Pierre Mazeaud
- Preceded by: Jean Cabannes
- Succeeded by: Renaud Denoix de Saint Marc

Minister for Social Affairs, Health and Urban Issues
- In office 30 March 1993 – 11 May 1995
- President: François Mitterrand
- Prime Minister: Édouard Balladur
- Deputy: Philippe Douste-Blazy
- Preceded by: Bernard Kouchner
- Succeeded by: Élisabeth Hubert

13th President of the European Parliament
- In office 17 July 1979 – 18 January 1982
- Preceded by: Emilio Colombo
- Succeeded by: Piet Dankert

Member of the European Parliament for France
- In office 17 July 1979 – 30 March 1993
- Preceded by: Constituency established
- Succeeded by: Jean-Marie Vanlerenberghe

Minister of Health
- In office 28 May 1974 – 4 July 1979
- President: Valéry Giscard d'Estaing
- Prime Minister: Jacques Chirac; Raymond Barre
- Preceded by: Michel Poniatowski
- Succeeded by: Jacques Barrot

Personal details
- Born: Simone Annie Jacob; 13 July 1927 Nice, France
- Died: 30 June 2017 (aged 89) Paris, France
- Resting place: Panthéon
- Party: UDF (1979, 1984, 1995–1997); UDI (2012–2017); European Liberal Democratic and Reform Party (in the European Parliament)
- Spouse: Antoine Veil (m. 1946; died 2013)
- Children: 3, including Pierre-François
- Education: Faculty of Law of Paris; University of Paris; Sciences Po ENM

Simone Veil DBE (French: [simɔn vɛj]; née Simone Annie Jacob; 13 July 1927 – 30 June 2017) was a French magistrate, Holocaust survivor, and politician. Deported as a teenager to Auschwitz-Birkenau and later Bergen-Belsen, she became a prominent advocate for human dignity and European reconciliation. As minister of health, she championed women's rights and is best remembered for the landmark 1975 law legalising abortion, known as the Veil Act (French: Loi Veil).

In 1979, Veil became the first woman elected President of the European Parliament, symbolising both her stature and her commitment to European integration as a guarantee of peace. She later served on France's Constitutional Council (1998–2007), the country's highest legal authority, and as president of the Fondation pour la Mémoire de la Shoah, where she contributed to Holocaust remembrance and education.

Honoured nationally and internationally, she was elected to the Académie Française in 2008, received the grand cross of the Légion d’honneur in 2012, and was awarded numerous doctorates honoris causa abroad. After her death in 2017, she and her husband, Antoine Veil, were interred at the Panthéon in July 2018 during a state ceremony led by President Emmanuel Macron.

== Early years and family ==
Simone Jacob was born on 13 July 1927 to an atheist Jewish family in Nice. Her father André Jacob was an architect who graduated from the Beaux-Arts de Paris and went on to win the Prix de Rome for Architecture. In 1922 he married Yvonne Steinmetz, who had just passed her Baccalauréat and was about to start studying chemistry. André Jacob insisted that she abandon her studies upon marriage. The family had moved from Paris to Nice in 1924, hoping to benefit from construction projects on the Côte d’Azur. Simone was the youngest of four siblings, Madeleine (nicknamed Milou), born in 1923; Denise, born in 1924 and Jean, born in 1925. Her father's family had come from Lorraine, while her mother's side came from the Rhineland region and from Belgium.

Simone's family was explicitly Jewish but non-practicing. "Being a member of the Jewish community was never a problem. It was proudly claimed by my father, but for cultural reasons, not religious ones", she wrote in her autobiography. "In his eyes, if the Jewish people were to remain the chosen people, it was because they were the people of the Book, the people of thinking and writing."

=== Deportation ===
When Germany invaded France and the Vichy regime came to power in June 1940, the family managed to avoid being deported, as Nice had been included in the Italian occupation zone. Asked not to come to school by its superintendent, Simone Jacob had to study at home. As the round-up of Jews intensified, the family split up and lived with different friends under false identities. Denise left for Lyon to join the resistance, while 16-year-old Simone continued studying and passed her baccalauréat exam under her real name in March 1944. The next day she was arrested by the Gestapo on her way out to meet friends and celebrate the end of her secondary education. The rest of her family was also arrested on that day.

On 7 April 1944, Simone, her mother, and her sisters were sent to the transit camp of Drancy, then on 13 April were deported to Auschwitz in Convoy 71. Simone's brother and father were deported to the occupied Baltic states (Kaunas and/or Tallinn) in Convoy 73, never to be seen again, and thus assumed to have been murdered. Her sister Denise was deported to the Ravensbrück concentration camp, which she survived, and after the end of World War II in Europe was reunited with Simone.

On 15 April 1944, Simone arrived at Auschwitz. She later wrote that she managed to avoid the gas chamber by lying about her age and was registered for the labour camp. In January 1945, Simone, along with her mother and sister, was sent on a march to Bergen-Belsen concentration camp, where her mother died of typhus. Madeleine also fell ill but, like Simone, was saved when the camp was liberated on 15 April 1945.

=== Return to France ===
Simone Jacob returned to France and started studying law at the University of Paris before going to the Institut d'études politiques, where she met Antoine Veil. The couple married on 26 October 1946, and would go on to have three sons, Jean, Nicolas, and Pierre-François. They moved to live in the American occupation zone in Germany. In 1952, Madeleine Jacob died with her son in a car accident after visiting Simone in Stuttgart.

== Political career ==
=== Ministry of Justice, 1956–1974 ===
After graduating from the Faculty of Law of Paris with a law degree, Veil spent several years practising law. In 1954, she passed the national examination to become a magistrate. She entered the National Penitentiary Administration under the Ministry of Justice, where she held a senior position and was responsible for judicial affairs. She improved women's prison conditions and the treatment of incarcerated women. In 1964, she left to become the director of civil affairs, where she improved French women's general rights and status. She successfully achieved the right to dual parental control of family legal matters and adoptive rights for women. In 1970, she became secretary general of the Superior Council of the Judiciary.

=== Minister of Health, 1974–1979 ===
From 1974 to 1979, Veil served as Minister of Health in the governments of Prime Ministers Jacques Chirac and Raymond Barre. She held successive portfolios: Minister of Health (28 May 1974 – 29 March 1977); Minister of Health and Social Security (29 March 1977 – 3 April 1978); and Minister of Health and Family (3 April 1978 – 4 July 1979).

During her tenure, she advanced two major pieces of social legislation. The first, adopted on 4 December 1974, expanded access to contraception, including the combined oral contraceptive pill, which had been legalised in 1967.

The second, adopted on 17 January 1975, legalised abortion in France under specific conditions, and is widely regarded as a turning point in French social policy. The parliamentary debate surrounding the law was marked by exceptional hostility, including personal attacks directed at Veil and her family by opponents of reform. The legislation, commonly referred to as the Veil Act, later became central to her public legacy, and she was frequently honoured for her role in its passage.

In 1976, Veil also contributed to the introduction of restrictions on smoking in certain public places and addressed the issue of unequal access to medical care in rural areas.

=== European Parliament, 1979–1993 ===
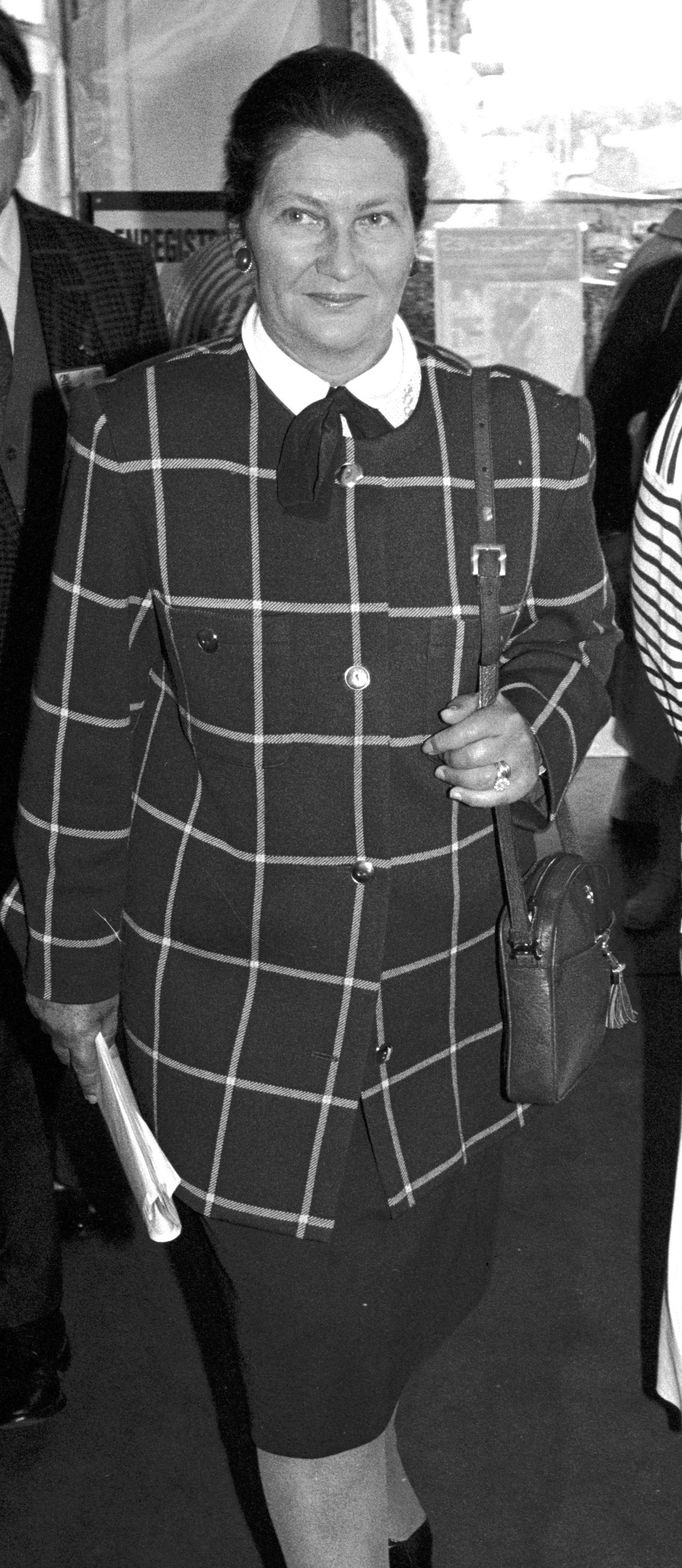
Simone Veil in Deauville in 1988.

In 1979, Veil was elected to the European Parliament in its first direct elections. At the Parliament's inaugural session, she was elected its first President, a position she held until 1982. The archives relating to her presidency are held at the Historical Archives of the European Union in Florence.

In 1981, Veil was awarded the prestigious Charlemagne Prize, which recognises individuals for their contributions to European unity.

After her presidency ended in 1982, Veil remained a Member of the European Parliament. She was re-elected a last time in 1989, serving until 1993. She also served as Chair of the European Liberal Democrat and Reform Party until 1989.

Between 1984 and 1992, she served on the Committee on the Environment, Public Health and Food Safety and the Committee on Political Affairs. She then joined the Committee on Foreign Affairs and its Subcommittee on Human Rights. From 1989 to 1993, she was also a member of Parliament's delegation to the ACP–EU Joint Parliamentary Assembly, serving as its vice-chair until 1992.

=== Return to French Government, 1993–1995 ===
From 31 March 1993 to 16 May 1995, Veil was again a member of the cabinet, serving as Minister of State and Minister of Health, Social Affairs and the city in the government of Prime Minister Édouard Balladur. In the mid-1990s, as Minister of Health, she introduced a number of measures to support mothers of young children, people with disabilities, and HIV-positive patients.

In 1983, she and her husband founded the Club Vauban, a political think tank intended to bridge divisions between the left and right.

=== Member of the Constitutional Council, 1998 ===
In 1998, she was appointed to the Constitutional Council of France. In 2005, she put herself briefly on leave from the council in order to campaign in favour of the Treaty establishing a Constitution for Europe. This action was criticized because it seemed to contradict the legal provisions that members of the council should keep a distance from partisan politics: the independence and impartiality of the council would be jeopardized, critics said, if members could put themselves "on leave" in order to campaign for a project. In response, Veil said that she, the president of the Constitutional Council and colleagues had deliberated on the issue beforehand and they had given her permission to take her leave without having to resign. Being a staunch supporter of the European project, she believed others should not "ignore the historical dimension of European integration".

== Later life, death, and legacy ==
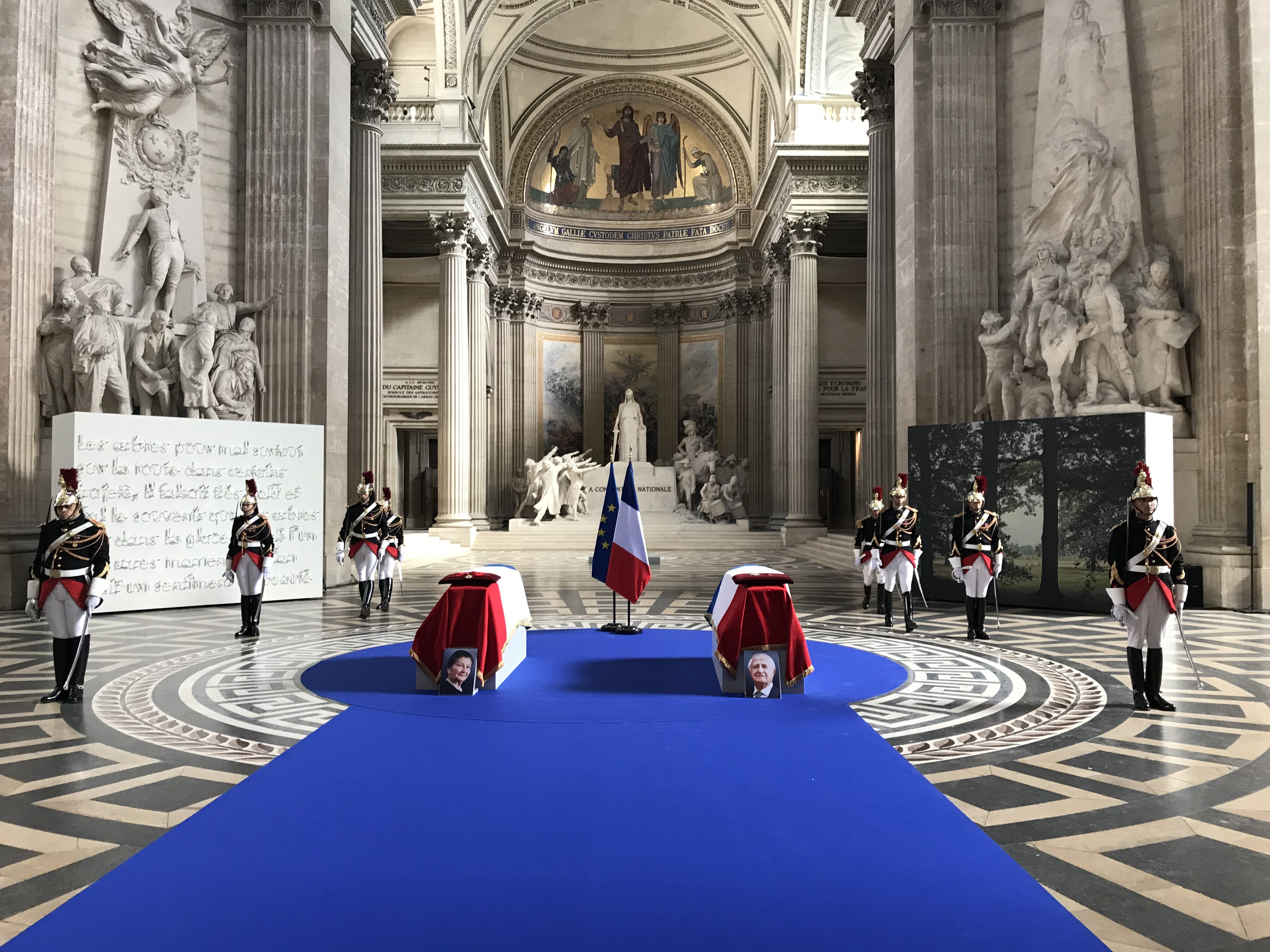
The coffins of Simone and Antoine Veil under the dome of the Panthéon on 1 July 2018

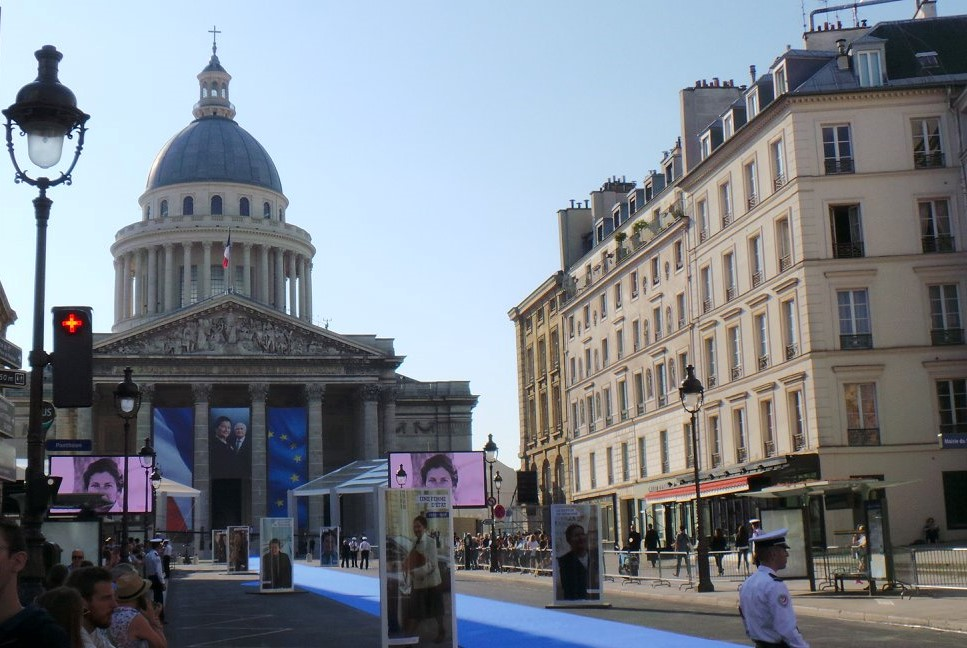
Rue Soufflot on the day of the Panthéon ceremony

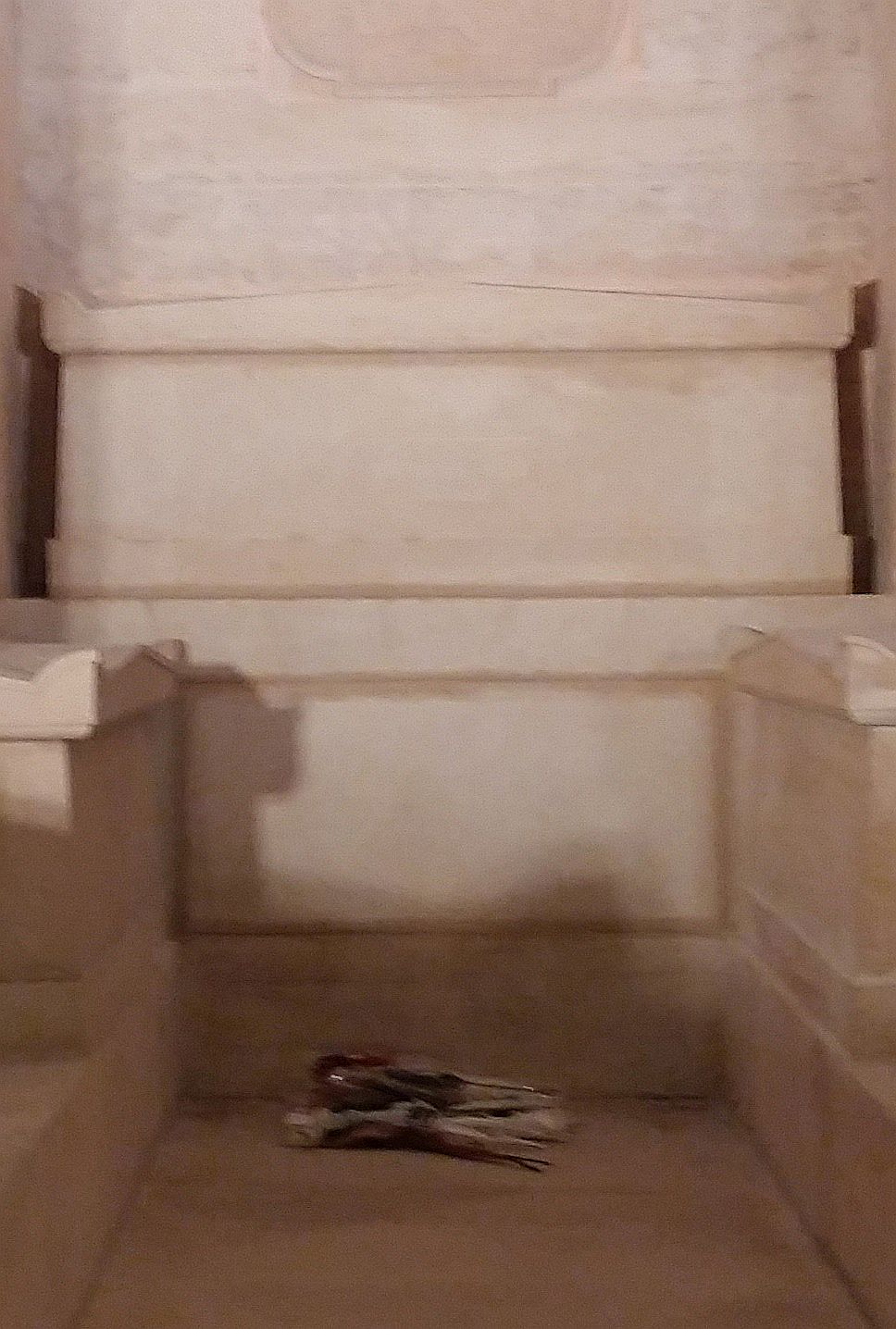
The tombs of Simone and Antoine Veil in the crypt of the Panthéon

In 2003, she was elected to the Board of Directors of the International Criminal Court's Trust Fund for Victims. In 2007, Simone Veil supported presidential candidate Nicolas Sarkozy. She was by his side on the day after he received 31 per cent of the vote in the first round of the presidential elections that year.

In 2008, Simone Veil became the sixth woman to be elected to the Académie française. She joined the academy's forty "immortals", as the members are informally known, occupying the 13th seat, once the seat of literary figure Jean Racine. Her induction address was given in March 2010 by Jean d'Ormesson. On her sword, given to her as to every other immortal, are engraved her Auschwitz number (number 78651), the motto of the French Republic (liberté, égalité, fraternité) and the motto of the European Union, Unity in diversity (Unis dans la diversité).

Veil died at her home on 30 June 2017, at age 89. Her son Jean said at her public ceremony on 5 July, "I forgive you for having poured water over my head", in reference to an event where she had emptied a carafe of water over his head in disgust at what she considered to be his misogynist remarks.

Veil has been described by scholars and institutions as a committed humanist whose political and European engagement was grounded in respect for human dignity, human rights, democracy and equality.

On 5 July 2017, Veil was honoured with a national ceremony and military honours in the courtyard of les Invalides, after which she was interred next to her husband, who died in 2013, at Montparnasse Cemetery. The ceremony at les Invalides was attended by President Macron, Holocaust survivors, politicians and dignitaries. In his speech during the ceremony, President Macron announced the decision to rebury Veil and her husband in the Panthéon, which was done on 1 July 2018.

In 2024 the Simone Veil Bridge (Fr: Pont Simone Veil) opened. Designed by OMA/Rem Koolhaas, it spans the Garonne River in Bordeaux and is the overall widest bridge in Europe.

== Personal life ==
- She and her husband lived in an apartment on the second floor of 11, Place Vauban in the 7th arrondissement of Paris, on the rive gauche.

== Honours ==
=== National honours ===
- Grand Cross of the Legion of Honour (2012)
- Knight of the Ordre National du Mérite (2001)
- Medal of Honor for Health and Social Affairs (2012)

=== Foreign honours ===
- Brazil: Grand Cross of the Order of the Southern Cross (1978)
- Cameroon: Grand Officier of the Order of Valour (1982)
- Germany: Knight Commander of the Order of Merit of the Federal Republic of Germany (1975)
- Ivory Coast: Grand Officier of the Order of Ivory Merit (1978)
- Latvia: Grand Cross of the Order of the Three Stars (2007)
- Luxembourg: Grand Cross of the Order of Merit of the Grand Duchy of Luxembourg (1978)
- Morocco: Commander of the Order of Ouissam Alaouite (1978)
- Portugal: Grand Cross of the Order of Prince Henry (1993)
- Portugal : Grand Cross of the Order of Merit (1987)
- Senegal: Grand Officier of the National Order of the Lion (1978)
- Tunisia: Grand Officier of the Order of the Republic (1977)
- United Kingdom: Honorary Dame Commander of the Order of the British Empire (1998)

== Awards ==
- In 2005 she was awarded the Prince of Asturias Award in International Cooperation.
- In 2007 she was awarded the North-South Prize of the Council of Europe.
- In 2008 she won the Charles V Prize, awarded by the Fundación Academia Europea de Yuste in honour of "her acknowledged merits in the struggle for the advancement of women's equality."
- In 2010 she received the Coudenhove-Kalergi Badge by the Europa-Union Münster.
- 2011 Schiller Prize of the City of Marbach
- She was a jury member for the Conflict Prevention Prize awarded every year by the Fondation Chirac.
- In 2018 she was the subject of a €2 commemorative coin, the design of which included her deportation registration number, the European Parliament and the year "1975" signifying the legalisation of abortion.

=== Honorary degrees ===
- Princeton University (United States), 1975
- Weizmann Institute of Science (Israel), 1976
- Bar-Ilan University (Israel), 1979
- University of Cambridge (England), 1980
- Hebrew University of Jerusalem, 1980
- Yale University (United States), 1980
- Georgetown University (United States), 1981
- University of Urbino (Italy), 1981
- University of Sussex (England), 1982
- Yeshiva University of New York (United States), 1982
- Université libre de Bruxelles (Belgium), 1984
- Brandeis University (United States), 1989
- University of Glasgow (Scotland), 1995
- University of Pennsylvania (United States), 1997
- University of Cassino and Southern Lazio (Italy), 2006
- Ben-Gurion University of the Negev (Israel), 2010

=== The Simone Veil Prize ===
In 2018, the government of France established a prize in memory of Veil to honour people who fight for women's causes. The intent is to draw attention to efforts to promote women's autonomy, education, participation in leadership roles, and freedom from violence and discrimination. The prize is awarded each year on 8 March, International Women's Day, with €100,000 to support work in the winner's area of concern. On 8 March 2019, the first Simone Veil Prize was awarded to Aissa Doumara Ngatansou, co-founder of the Association for the Elimination of Violence against Women (ALVF) in Cameroon.

=== Legacy ===
- A French-language biographical drama film about her, Simone Veil, A Woman of the Century, was released in 2022.
- The Simone Veil Bridge in Bordeaux, designed by Office for Metropolitan Architecture and inaugurated in July 2024, bears her name.
- In 2026, the Mémorial de la Shoah in Paris presented the exhibition Simone Veil. Mes sœurs et moi.

== Publications ==
- Veil, S. (2009). Une vie. Ldp Litterature. Stock. ISBN 978-2-253-12776-5.
- Veil, S. (2020). Speeches 2002-2007. Editions Le Manuscrit. ISBN 978-2-304-00423-6.
- Veil, S.; Adler, N.; Nice, G.; Boraine, A. (2004). Genocide and Accountability: Three Public Lectures by Simone Veil, Geoffrey Nice and Alex Boraine. Amsterdam University Press. ISBN 978-90-5629-364-2.
- Veil, S.; Hausser, I. (2010). Une jeunesse au temps de la Shoah: extraits d'Une vie. Litterature & Documents (in French). Librairie générale française. ISBN 978-2-253-12762-8.
- Veil, S. (2004). Les hommes aussi s'en souviennent. Essais - Documents (in French). Stock. ISBN 978-2-234-06831-5.
- Veil, S. (2016). Mes combats. Bayard Culture. ISBN 978-2-227-49020-8.
- Veil, S.; Ormesson, J. (2011). Discours de réception de Simone Veil à l'Académie française. Essais Laffont (in French). Groupe Robert Laffont. ISBN 978-2-221-11738-5.
- Veil, S. (2019). L'Aube à Birkenau (in French). Groupe Margot. ISBN 979-10-375-0108-0.
- Launay, C.; Soulé, M.; Veil, S. (1980). L'adoption: Données médicales, psychologiques et sociales (in French). Les milieux éducatifs de l'enfant. ISBN 978-2-402-22881-7.

Political offices
Preceded by Michel Poniatowski	Minister of Health; 1974–1979	Succeeded by Michel Poniatowski
Preceded by Emilio Colombo	President of the European Parliament; 1979–1982	Succeeded by Piet Dankert
Preceded by Bernard Kouchner	Minister of Health; 1993–1995	Succeeded by Élisabeth Hubert
Academic offices
Preceded by Dries van Agt	Invocation Speaker of the College of Europe; 1980	Succeeded by Bruno Kreisky
Awards
Preceded by Emilio Colombo	Recipient of the Charlemagne Prize; 1982	Succeeded by Juan Carlos of Spain
Preceded by Erasmus Programme	Recipient of the Prince of Asturias Awards; 2005	Succeeded by Bill and Melinda Gates Foundation
Legal offices
Preceded by Jean Cabannes	Member of the Constitutional Council; 1998–2007	Succeeded by Renaud Denoix de Saint Marc
Honorary titles
Preceded by Pierre Messmer	Member of the Académie française 2008–2017	Succeeded by Maurizio Serra
