= Élie Buzyn =

French surgeon (1929–2022)

- Born: 7 January 1929; Łódź, Poland
- Died: 23 May 2022 (aged 93); Paris, France
- Occupation: Orthopedic surgeon
- Known for: Survivor of The Holocaust
- Spouse: Etty Buzyn
- Children: Agnès Buzyn

Élie Buzyn (7 January 1929 – 23 May 2022) was a Polish-born French orthopedic surgeon, of Polish Jewish origin, a survivor and witness of The Holocaust.

== Biography ==
Buzyn was born in Łódź, Poland. Initially, he was with his family in the Łódź Ghetto. As early as January 1945, in front of the advance of the Soviet Army, the Nazi authorities transferred the prisoners to the Buchenwald concentration camp, during the Death Marches. Arriving at the Buchenwald camp, he had his shoes stolen. After that, his feet froze. In the infirmary, he was told that he must have both feet amputated to prevent the development of gangrene. Frightened, he ran away from the infirmary and returned to his barracks. A Russian soldier, hearing about what had happened, recommended that he soak his feet alternately in cold and hot water. After a few days and nights, his legs began to heal.

Later, he lived in Palestine for seven years, before it became the State of Israel; then, after a short stay in France, he spent two years in Oran. In 1956, he moved permanently to France and received a medical degree, and later became a surgeon. He testified to his desire to forget, which led to him being deprived of his liberty. After 50 years of silence, he decided to testify about his life to ghetto and camp survivors.

Buzyn annually visited Auschwitz.

He was knighted in the Legion of Honour in 2014 and commanded an Ordre des Palmes académiques in 2017.

Élie Buzyn was the husband of Etty Buzyn, psychologist, psychoanalyst and writer. He was the father of Agnès Buzyn, president of the College of the High Authority for Health then Minister of Health from 2017 to 2020. He died on 23 May 2022 at the age of 93.
