= Jacques-Martin Tétaz =

French architect

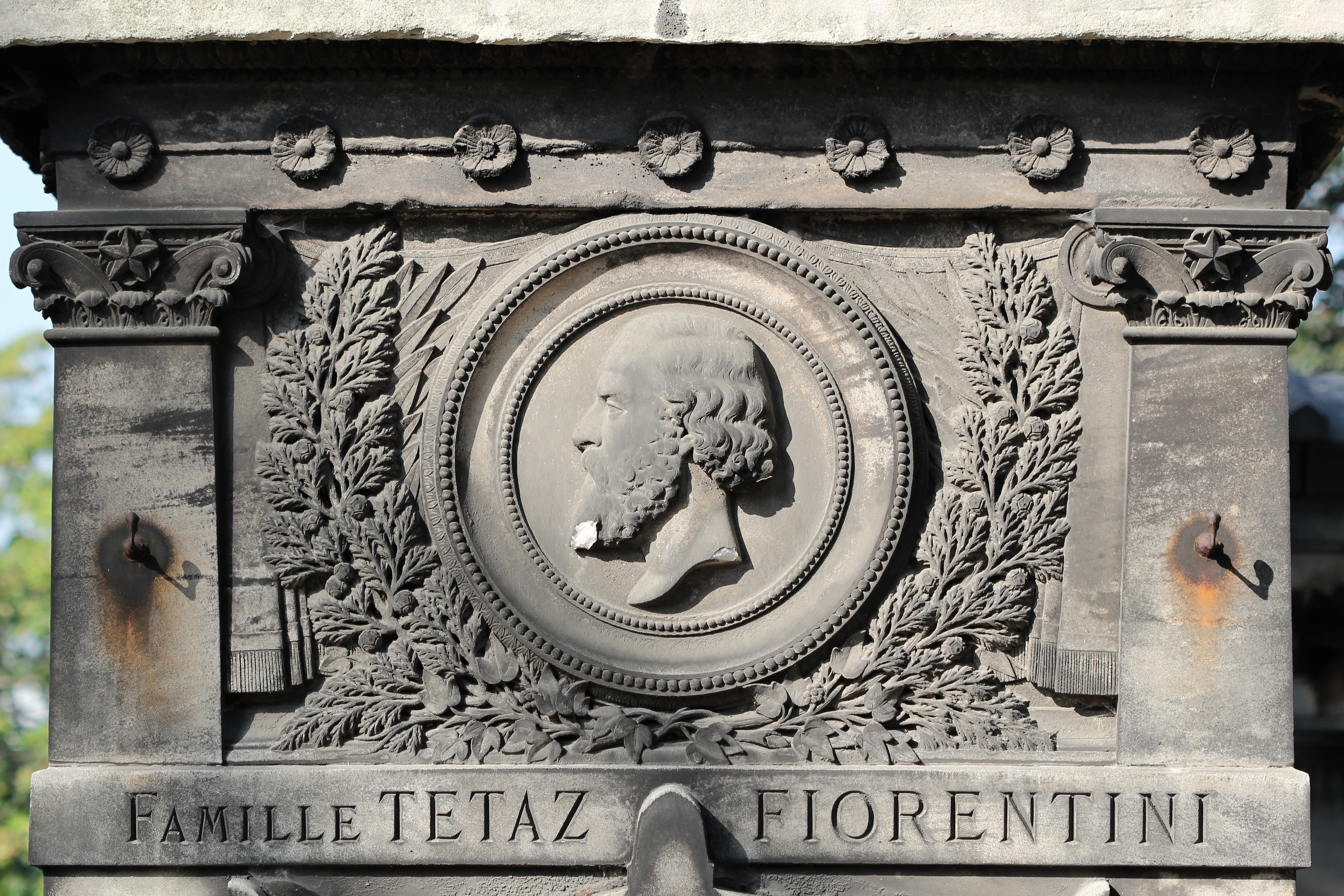
- Medallion on the tomb of Jacques-Martin Tétaz, in the Père-Lachaise cemetery.
- Born: 6 March 1818; Paris, France
- Died: 16 October 1865 (aged 47); Rueil-Malmaison, France
- Occupation: Architect
- Awards: second Prix de Rome
- Practice: architect
- Buildings: Palais de l'Alma

Jacques-Martin Tétaz (6 March 1818 – 16 October 1865) was a French architect. He was admitted at the École nationale supérieure des Beaux-Arts where he was the student of Jean-Nicolas Huyot and Louis-Hippolyte Lebas. He was the recipient of the second architecture Prix de Rome in 1841. He was housed at the Villa Medici from 1844 to 1848.

He is only known by the Palais de l'Alma, which was built between 1861 and 1864.
