= Yves Lévy =

French immunologist

President of the Inserm
- In office 2014–2018
- Preceded by: André Syrota
- Succeeded by: Claire Giry

Personal details
- Born: 1 August 1957 (age 68) Casablanca, Morocco
- Spouse: Agnès Buzyn (m. 1997)
- Children: 3
- Profession: Physician

Yves Lévy (born 1 August 1957) is a French physician researcher and professor of clinical immunology who was CEO of the French Institute of Health and Medical Research (INSERM) from 2014 until 2018.

== Early life and education ==
Lévy was born in Casablanca, Morocco, and arrived in France with his parents in 1973. He was naturalised one and a half years later. His passion was literature, before he turned to medicine. After studying medicine and finishing his residency he dedicated himself to HIV research in 1986.

== Career ==
From 1985 Lévy worked in different research units at Inserm, the French Institute of Health and Medical Research. From 1996 to the present he has directed the Department of Clinical Immunology and Infectious Diseases at Henri Mondor de Créteil Hospital. Lévy became a professor of clinical immunology, specializing on immunotherapies and vaccines for HIV infection, immunodeficiencies and infectious diseases.

In 2006, Lévy became scientific director of the vaccine programme of the French National Agency for Research on AIDS and Viral Hepatitis (ANRS).

From 2010 to 2012, Lévy was vice-dean of the Faculty of Medicine, Paris-Est Créteil University (UPEC). In 2011, he created the Vaccine Research Institute laboratory of excellence under the Investissement d’Avenir (Investment for the Future) programme and has been its executive director. In 2012, he became a special advisor to the Minister of Higher Education, Research and Innovation Geneviève Fioraso.

In June 2014, after 29 years of working at INSERM, Lévy was appointed its CEO by ministers Marisol Touraine and Fioraso. During confirmation hearings, a conflict of interest was brought up for the first time, because his wife had been appointed by Emmanuel Macron as the minister of health in May 2017. Although his term expired June 11, 2018 and in spite of public controversy he remained the interim head. As of mid June 2018 he was expected to run again. but on 30 July 2018 he withdrew his candidacy .

On October 11, 2018, the Minister of Justice Nicole Belloubet appointed Lévy as "advisor of state in extraordinary service". In May 2019, during a visit to the Democratic Republic of Congo , Jean-Yves Le Drian, the Minister of Europe and Foreign Affairs appointed him as his special envoy on the Kivu Ebola epidemic.

== Personal life ==
Since 1997, Lévy has been married to French hematologist and former French health minister Agnès Buzyn. They have one child together.

== Service ==
- Coalition for Epidemic Preparedness Innovations (CEPI), Member of the scientific advisory board
- DIM 1health, Member of the board of directors
- International AIDS Society (IAS), Member of the Industry Collaboration Group
- World Health Summit, Member of the Council
- French Foundation for Rare Diseases, Ex-Officio Member of the board of directors (2014–2019)
- French National Alliance for Life Sciences and Health (Aviesan), Ex-Officio Chair of the Executive Board (2014–2019)
- Institut Curie, Ex-Officio Member of the supervisory board (2014–2018)
