= Palais de l'Alma =

Palace in Paris, France

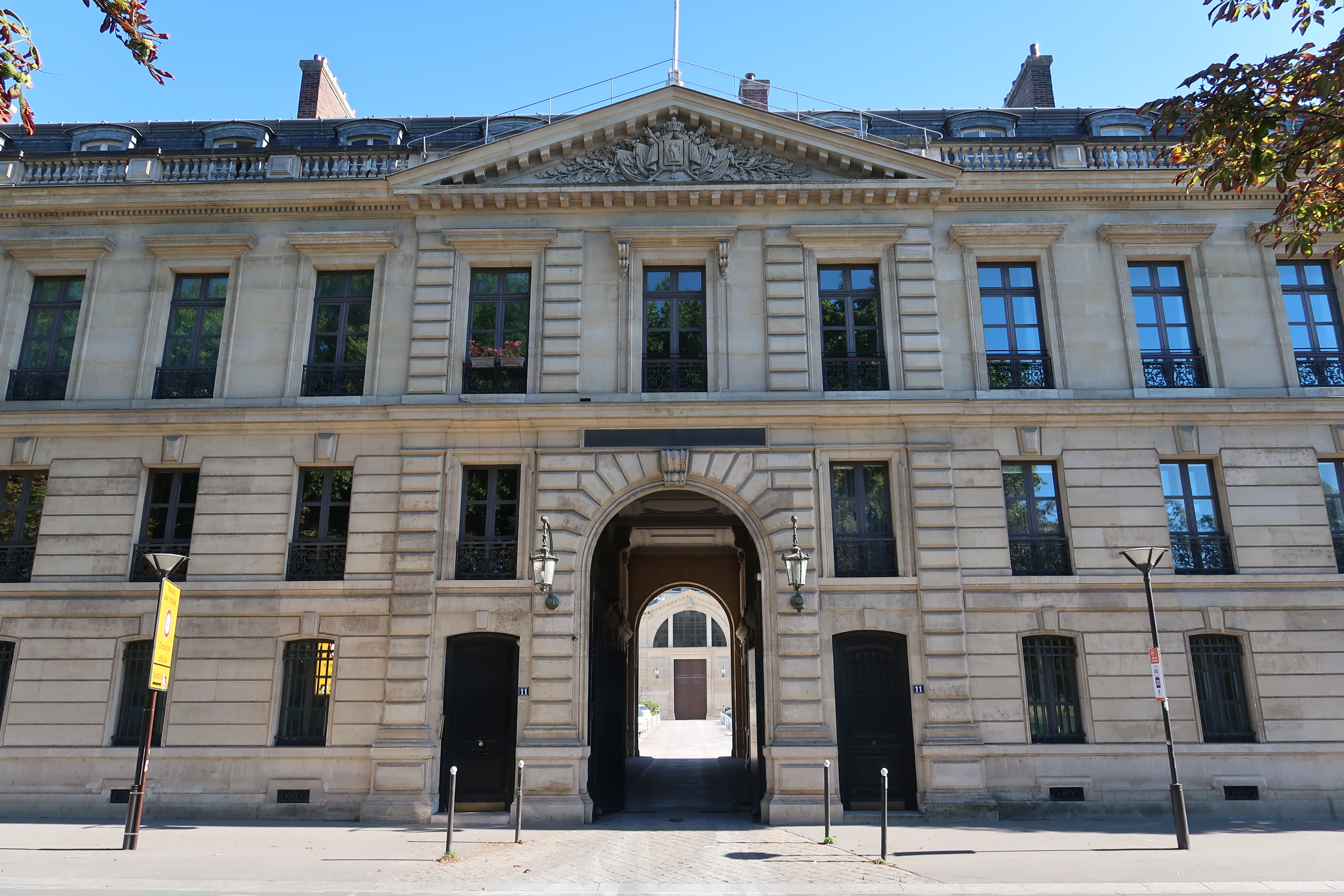
- View of the Palais de l'Alma from Quai Branly
- Interactive map of the Palais de l'Alma area

General information
- Architectural style: 19th century
- Location: 11 Quai Branly, 75007 Paris, France
- Construction started: 1861
- Completed: 1864

Design and construction
- Architect: Jacques-Martin Tétaz

The Palais de l'Alma (French pronunciation: [palɛ d(ə) lalma]; English: Palace of the Alma) is a national palace of the French Republic in Paris's 7th arrondissement. It is located just east of the Musée du Quai Branly, almost in front of the Pont de l'Alma. The name of the palace comes from the Battle of the Alma (1854).

== History ==
The palace was built between 1861 and 1864 by Jacques-Martin Tétaz in the objective to become stables for Napoleon III, as well as house their personnel. In 1881, it became a dependency of the presidency under the Third Republic. Then in 1947, it housed the French meteorology office. The palace has become a French Monument historique since 30 October 2002.

The palace now houses approximately 70 official housings, amongst those some of them are used for close collaborators to the President of France. François Mitterrand used an apartment to house his mistress Anne Pingeot and their daughter Mazarine when he was president. François de Grossouvre was also living there at the same time.

Alexandre Benalla, who served as a security officer and deputy chief of staff to President Emmanuel Macron, was housed there from 9 July 2018, one week before being taken into custody for the judicial and political case which took his name.
