= Syndicat de la Magistrature =

Second-largest French magistrates' trade union

Logo

The Syndicat de la Magistrature (SM; English: Union of the Magistracy) is France's second largest magistrates' trade union in terms of membership after the more conservative Union syndicale des magistrats (USM). It was founded on 8 June 1968 in the direct aftermath of the May 68 events.

== Political positions ==
The Syndicat de la Magistrature is considered close to left-wing parties such as the Socialist Party, historically, as well as La France Insoumise in more recent years. It favours a larger independence of the judiciary from the executive. It has criticised immigration laws it considers severe, "police violence", as well as fast-tracking trials in case of immediate admission of guilt. Amid the 2005 civil unrest in neighbourhoods throughout the country with large immigrant populations, the union criticised then-Interior Minister Nicolas Sarkozy's use of what it saw as inappropriate language. In the 2012 presidential election, it called to defeat Sarkozy.

The Syndicat de la Magistrature is member of Magistrats Européens pour la Démocratie et les Libertés (MEDEL), a progressive European NGO of judges and public prosecutors.

== Mur des cons affair ==
In 2013, the union became the centre of a political controversy that would become known as the Mur des cons affair (French: Affaire du Mur des cons), after journalists published images of a wall in the union's headquarters in Paris on which public personalities, most notably a number of politicians (including government ministers under former President Nicolas Sarkozy), were insulted through pinned photographs with comments. Justice Minister Christiane Taubira reacted to the affair by calling the comments on the wall "unbearable, stupid and unhealthy", stating in front of the Senate that she would ask for an investigation into any possible ethics breaches to get "rid (…) of the suspicion that weighs on [the judiciary's] impartiality".

In 2019, the union's former chairwoman Françoise Martres was found guilty of public insults by a Paris appellate court. Although it was not established that she had participated herself, she was held responsible for the insults.

The affair has been deemed "disatrous" for the judiciary as a whole, giving it a politicised image. The union has since largely lost its standing with the public. Its criticism in 2020 of newly appointed Justice Minister Éric Dupond-Moretti went ignored by President Emmanuel Macron. Dupond-Moretti would later himself state that the affair was "pathetic" for the union, arguing it does not represent the judiciary as a whole.
