= AgoraVox =

French language website

- Website type: Citizen journalism
- Available in: French
- Owners: Carlo Revelli, Joël de Rosnay
- Creator: Carlo Revelli
- Website: agoravox.fr
- Commercial: Yes
- Registration: Optional
- Launched: March 2005
- Current status: Online

AgoraVox is a French language news website founded in March 2005 by Carlo Revelli and Joël de Rosnay. AgoraVox was one of the first citizen journalism websites in France, and is similar to the community sites L'Echo du Village (1998) and Indymedia (1999). According to the Reuters Institute for the Study of Journalism at Oxford University, "AgoraVox is one of the most prominent European examples of a citizen journalism site".

As of April 2009, nearly 40,000 volunteers were enrolled as editors of the French version. They were 70,000 in April 2011. At that time, the site had over 1900 volunteer moderators. An Italian version of the site was launched at the end of 2008. Many variations have also emerged: AgoraVox TV, NaturaVox, EducaVox, CareVox, Orser, and SportVox. According to Google Trends, the site agoravox.fr has on average 50,000 daily unique visitors, and agoravox.tv has 15,000 unique visitors.

== History ==
The company Cybion, created by Carlo Revelli and Joël de Rosnay, is behind this project and provides its funding. The AgoraVox project is the culmination of years of research and experimentation. The starting point was Carlo Revelli's research on strategic intelligence on the Internet: "Indeed, beyond the enterprise, which will revolutionize individual behavior on the Internet, it is this "watchman attitude", which is to keep your eyes open and to enrich yourself at all levels: whether to find unpublished information, check a rumor, enrich your knowledge, forge your beliefs, compare prices of a book, identify the surgeon who introduced the latest technology to treat a rare disease, etc." Revelli announced the creation of the AgoraVox Foundation on the site of the newspaper. The Foundation, whose headquarters are in Belgium, was established on 18 June 2008 and state-approved by the Minister of Justice of Belgium, thus becoming the first media group of its type to achieve this recognition.

== Editorial policy ==
Editorial policy, as defined on the site, calls for the "publication of unpublished stories, discovered by citizens" . The site also carries many feature articles, stories already published elsewhere, comments and editorials often published in an "open forum" section. As part of intelligence work that places the citizen at the center of the system as a finder and analyzer of information, commentary on current events is important: to comment on existing information and carry out criticism of its treatment in the media, especially in areas where there is a climate of mistrust about it.

The editorial board is composed of members of the team of editors and AgoraVox moderators, each of whom have published at least four articles on the site. Originally, in order to be a member of the Drafting Committee, it was necessary to have already published a number of articles on AgoraVox and be recognized as an editor of "quality". Since 5 December 2007, becoming moderator only requires a writer to have published at least four articles. This is the first filter when requesting a publication, with the original AgoraVox team taking responsibility, once a quorum of approval is received, to make a final check before validation.

Generally (but not necessarily), the members of this committee are the editors 'historical', present on the platform almost since its launch. Articles can be changed in form or reproduced by the Foundation via AgoraVox's media partners, and their commercial exploitation is not excluded. Legal responsibility for an article is left to its author, who has the opportunity to withdraw it from immediate view by marking it with the comment "withdraw". The team who run the site believe that it benefits from a deep internal tendency in Western societies: "participation" of citizens, whose word would be censored by the mainstream media run by multinationals.

=== Uncensored broadcast ===
On 5 February 2007, during a television chat-show, French journalist Tristane Banon alleged that Dominique Strauss-Kahn had sexually assaulted her in 2002 during the course of an interview while she was researching Erreurs avouées:"It ended really badly. We ended up fighting. It finished really violently ... I said the word 'rape' to scare him but it didn't seem to scare him much ... " Strauss-Kahn's name was bleep censored when the television program was broadcast, and in the French media only AgoraVox subsequently repeated the allegations.

== Agoravox media ==
Items are listed in the "Blogs/Editorials" of Yahoo! News France. Agoravox is classified as a blog partner of Yahoo! News, but not within the category Yahoo! News category "Daily News." Google News lists certain AgoraVox items: they numbered about 600 in December 2006, and there were over 50,000 in February 2009. The German broadcaster Deutsche Welle elected AgoraVox "Best Journalistic Blog in French" in 2005. The launch of AgoraVox was closely followed by most newspapers, television and radio. In 2010, Frédéric Taddei was interviewed on AgoraVox.tv, where he expressed support for AgoraVox as an editorial initiative.

Issue 55 of the magazine Nexus ran a story on the issue of mandatory vaccination, following a survey conducted from July to October 2007 by AgoraVox, and coordinated by journalist Jean-Luc Martin-Lagardette for his article "Is mandatory immunization still justified?". A second participatory survey was launched in early May 2008 on the issue of "the state of poverty in France". A third survey was on the issue of participatory surcharges of hotline phone numbers.

== People who have published or have been interviewed on AgoraVox ==
- Frédéric Taddeï, journalist, TV host and radio
- Denis Robert, journalist, writer, filmmaker and visual artist
- Jacques Cheminade, French politician
- Nicolas Dupont-Aignan, French politician
- Corinne Lepage, French politician
- Philippe Bilger, a French judge
- Loic Le Meur, entrepreneur and blogger French
- Akhenaton, rap singer and producer (Member of AMI)
- Véronique Anger, French writer and journalist
- Denis Langlois, French writer
- François Hadji-Lazaro, French musician
- Noam Chomsky, American philosopher and Ilan Pappe, Israeli historian
- Pierre Musso, French philosopher and scientist
- Nathalie Kosciusko-Morizet, Minister for Ecology, Sustainable Development, Transportation and Housing
- Yves Michaud, French philosopher
- Benoît Peeters, French writer
- Jean-Pierre Willem, French anthropologist and physician
- Edgard Pisani, French politician
- Dominique Ambiel, television producer and French politician
- Abd al Malik, French musician
- Loïc Decrauze, French author
- Alain Lipietz, politician (EELV) and economist
- Marc Blondel, trade unionist, secretary general of the CGT-Force working from 1989 to 2004
- Stephan-Xavier Trano, French journalist and essayist

Several politicians and French elected office-holders (MPs, mayors, senators etc.) also regularly contribute columns on AgoraVox.

== See also ==
- Other French citizen journalism sites such as Rue 89, Le Post, Mediapart, and Atlantico
- The Korean website OhmyNews
