= Tristane Banon =

French journalist and writer (born 1979)

- Banon in 2017
- Born: 13 June 1979 (age 47); Neuilly-sur-Seine, France
- Occupations: Journalist and writer
- Writing career
- Language: French
- Notable awards: I Forgot to Kill Her (J'ai oublié de la tuer) selected for Chambéry 2005 festival for first novels – "Festival du premier roman Chambéry". Archived from the original on 14 May 2009.

Tristane Banon (born 13 June 1979) is a French journalist and writer. She is the daughter of Anne Mansouret and Gabriel Banon. She is a regular contributor on youth affairs at the French news website Atlantico.

== Early life and education ==
Tristane Banon was born in Neuilly-sur-Seine, Île-de-France. She is the daughter of Anne Mansouret, Socialist vice-president of the general council of Eure, representing Évreux-Est, in Upper Normandy. and French-Moroccan businessman Gabriel Banon who served as industrial policy advisor to French President Georges Pompidou and as economic advisor to Palestinian President Yasser Arafat. She is of Moroccan Jewish descent on her father's side and Iranian and Belgian on her mother's side. Her mother, Anne Mansouret, was born in Tehran, to an Iranian father and Belgian mother.

She is a god-daughter of Dominique Strauss-Kahn's second wife Brigitte Guillemette.

Banon earned a diploma from the Ecole Supérieure de Journalisme de Paris.

== Career ==
Banon initially worked as a journalist, anchorwoman on a television show about new information and communication technologies, and as a sport journalist. She was employed in the politics department, and later the cultural department, of the French weekly Paris-Match, then worked at the daily newspaper Le Figaro.

Her first book, a long essay entitled Erreurs avouées… (au masculin) about the biggest mistakes in the lives of political figures, was published in November 2003 by Anne Carrière. A short novel, Noir délire, inspired by the death of French actress Marie Trintignant, was released the same year in the literary review Bordel.

Her first novel J’ai oublié de la tuer ("I Forgot to Kill Her") was published in September 2004 by éditions Anne Carrière (édition Le Livre de Poche n° 30743). The novel, described by Banon as part-autobiographical, tells the story of a young girl's ruined childhood, neglected by her mother and forced to fend for herself against an alcoholic and abusive nanny.

Her second novel Trapéziste ("Trapezist") appeared in 2006, followed by Daddy Frénésie ("Daddy Frenzy") in 2008.

=== Allegations against Dominique Strauss-Kahn ===
On 5 February 2007, during a television chat-show, Banon alleged that Dominique Strauss-Kahn had attempted to rape her in 2002 during the course of an interview while she was researching Erreurs avouées: "It ended really badly. We ended up fighting. It finished really violently … I said the word 'rape' to scare him but it didn't seem to scare him much… " Strauss-Kahn's name was initially bleeped out when the television program was broadcast. The news website AgoraVox later repeated the allegations with his name included and Banon subsequently repeated them on a video recording. Banon's mother, Socialist Party politician Anne Mansouret, said in an interview that she had persuaded her daughter not to file charges at the time of the alleged rape attempt.

On 16 May 2011, it was reported Banon planned to file a legal complaint against Strauss-Kahn. On 20 May, Banon's lawyer, David Koubbi, said that neither he nor Banon wanted to be used (instrumentalisé) by the American judicial system in the New York v. Strauss-Kahn case, later dismissed due to the unreliability in the statements of the main prosecution witness. On 4 July, following Strauss-Kahn's release from house-arrest on his own recognizance in the New York case, David Koubbi said that Banon would file a complaint against Strauss-Kahn the following day. Strauss-Kahn's lawyers responded by saying they would in turn file a complaint of false accusation (dénonciation calomnieuse) against Banon.

The allegations were referred to, but without naming Banon explicitly, in Christophe Dubois' and Christophe Deloire's best-selling 2006 book Sexus Politicus about the private lives and sexual mores of leading French political figures. They were also the subject of the concluding chapter of Michel Taubmann's authorised biography Le Roman vrai de Dominique Strauss-Kahn ("The True Story of Dominique Strauss-Kahn"). Banon contested the version of events described in the biography when it appeared in May 2011.

In July 2011, the Paris prosecutor's office opened a preliminary investigation into Banon's complaint. Strauss-Kahn's lawyers said he had instructed them to open a countercomplaint against Banon for slander. In September Banon stated that if there is no criminal prosecution, she would bring a civil case against Strauss-Kahn. According to a report in L'Express, Strauss-Kahn admits to attempting to kiss Banon. On 29 September, Banon confronted Strauss-Kahn at a Paris police station at the request of French prosecutors investigating the alleged assault. In October the French public prosecutors dropped the investigation. They stated that there was a lack of evidence regarding the allegation of attempted rape. Although there was evidence of the less serious charge of "sexual assault", that charge could not be prosecuted because of the statute of limitations. According to transcripts of the police interrogation released by Strauss-Kahn's lawyers, Strauss-Kahn stated that, as Banon was leaving the apartment, he attempted to embrace her and to kiss her on the mouth; she pushed him away forcefully, saying something like "What are you doing?" and left.

In 2020, Banon was featured in the Netflix documentary series Room 2806: The Accusation, which details the New York allegation and other cases of alleged sexual assault by Strauss-Kahn, based on interviews with persons involved.

== Works ==
=== Novellas ===
- Noir délire [Black Delirium], Paris, éditions Flammarion (Bordel, numéro deux: Toujours aussi pute), 2003 – (ISBN 978-2080686114)

=== Novels ===
- J'ai oublié de la tuer [I Forgot To Kill Her], Paris, éditions Anne Carrière, 2004 – Prix du premier roman de Chambéry en 2005 – (ISBN 978-2843372841)
- Trapéziste [Trapezist], Paris, éditions Anne Carrière, 2006 – (ISBN 978-2843374265)
- Daddy Frénésie [Daddy Frenzy], Paris, éditions Plon, 21 août 2008 – (ISBN 978-2259207607)

=== Essays ===
- Erreurs avouées… au masculin [Confessed errors...the masculine way], Paris, éditions Anne Carrière, 2003
- Le bal des hypocrites, Vauvert, éditions Au Diable Vauvert, 2011
