= Accusation (disambiguation) =

An accusation is a statement by one person asserting that another person or entity has done something improper.

Accusation may also refer to:

- The Accusation (1950 film), an Italian film
- The Accusation (2021 film), a French film
- The Accusation (book), a short story collection by North Korea writer Bandi
- Room 2806: The Accusation, a 2020 French documentary miniseries
- Criminal accusation
- False accusation
