= Jack Lang (French politician) =

French politician (born 1939)

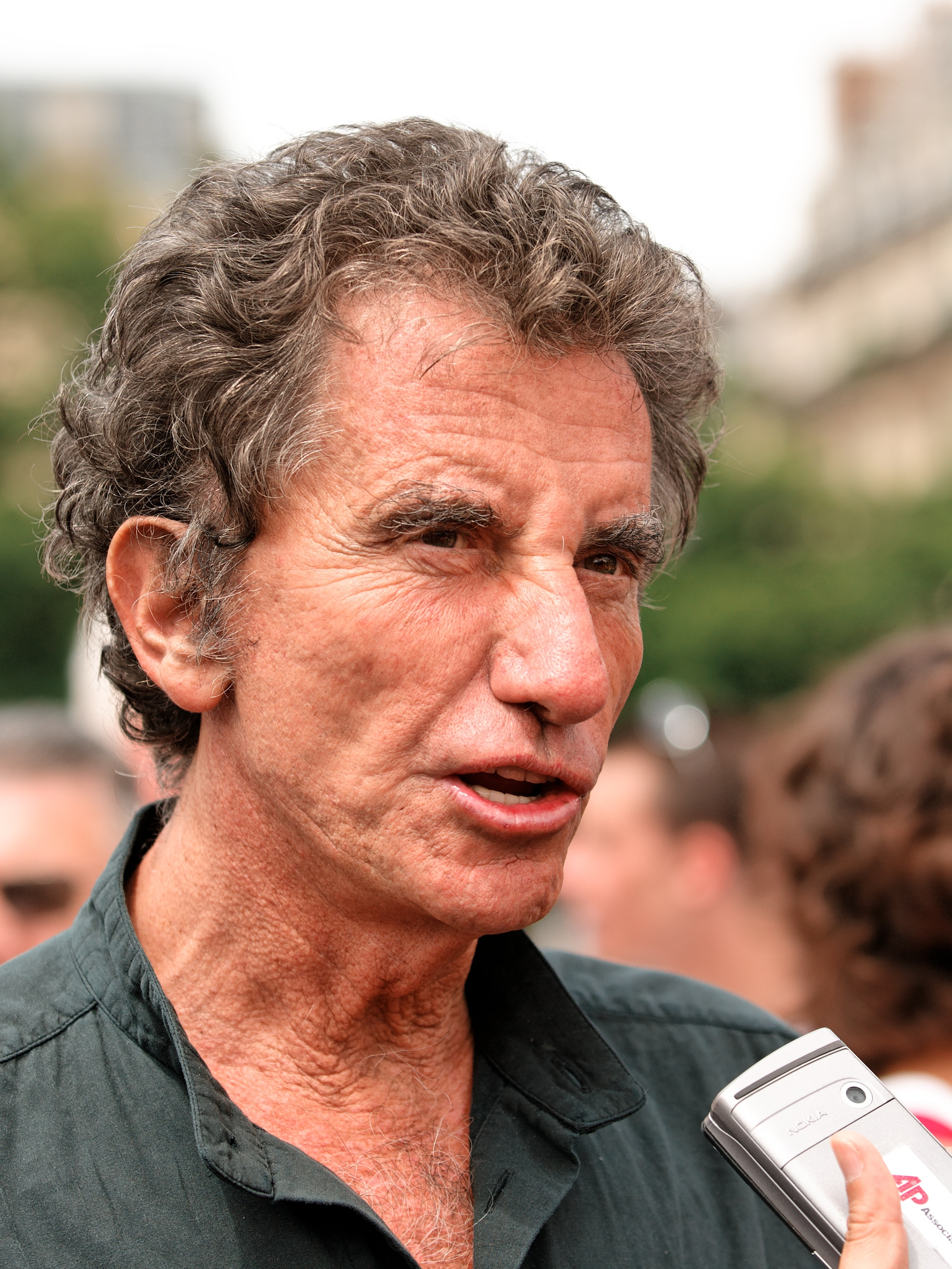
- Lang at the Gay Pride in 2008

Member of the National Assembly for Pas-de-Calais's 6th constituency
- In office 19 June 2002 – 17 June 2012
- Preceded by: Dominique Dupilet
- Succeeded by: Brigitte Bourguignon

Minister of National Education
- In office 27 March 2000 – 5 May 2002
- Prime Minister: Lionel Jospin
- Preceded by: Claude Allègre
- Succeeded by: Luc Ferry
- In office 2 April 1992 – 29 March 1993
- Prime Minister: Pierre Bérégovoy
- Preceded by: Lionel Jospin
- Succeeded by: François Bayrou

Government Spokesman
- In office 17 May 1991 – 2 April 1992
- Prime Minister: Édith Cresson
- Preceded by: Louis Le Pensec; Claude Evin
- Succeeded by: Martin Malvy

Minister of Culture
- In office 13 May 1988 – 29 March 1993
- Prime Minister: Michel Rocard; Édith Cresson; Pierre Bérégovoy
- Preceded by: François Léotard
- Succeeded by: Jacques Toubon
- In office 22 May 1981 – 20 March 1986
- Prime Minister: Pierre Mauroy; Laurent Fabius
- Preceded by: Michel d'Ornano
- Succeeded by: François Léotard

Member of the National Assembly for Loir-et-Cher's 1st constituency
- In office 12 June 1997 – 27 April 2000
- Preceded by: Michel Fromet
- Succeeded by: Michel Fromet
- In office 2 April 1993 – 9 December 1993
- Preceded by: Michel Fromet
- Succeeded by: Michel Fromet
- In office 2 April 1986 – 28 July 1988
- Preceded by: Proportional representation
- Succeeded by: Michel Fromet

Mayor of Blois
- In office 20 March 1989 – 21 March 2000
- Preceded by: Pierre Sudreau
- Succeeded by: Bernard Valette

Personal details
- Born: Jack Mathieu Émile Lang; 2 September 1939 (age 87) Mirecourt, France
- Party: Socialist
- Education: Sciences Po

Jack Mathieu Émile Lang (French: [dʒak matjø emil lɑ̃ɡ]; born 2 September 1939) is a French politician. A member of the Socialist Party, he served as Minister of Culture from 1981 to 1986 and again from 1988 to 1993, as well as Minister of National Education from 1992 to 1993 and 2000 to 2002.

He was also Mayor of Blois from 1989 until his resignation in 2000. Lang is best known for originating the Fête de la Musique in 1982 as Culture Minister, an all-day public music festival which occurs yearly on 21 June in France and throughout the world. He was president of the Arab World Institute in Paris from 2013 until his resignation in 2026 following the revelations of the Epstein files concerning his close relationship with financier and child sex offender Jeffrey Epstein.

== Life ==
Jack Lang was born to Roger Lang and Marie-Luce Bouchet in Mirecourt, in the département of Vosges. His father was from an assimilated, well-to-do secular Jewish family, based in Nancy. Roger Lang was the commercial manager of the family business which was founded by Jack's grandfather Albert. Roger and Albert were both freemasons. Jack's mother, Marie-Luce Bouchet, a Catholic, was born in 1919 to Emile Bouchet, who died in 1926, and Berthe Boulanger, a nurse who was also a freemason.

In 1938, Albert and Roger sent their wives to Vichy because of the threat of war with Germany. After the German invasion, Albert Lang and his wife moved to Brive-la-Gaillarde in Corrèze. The very young Jack and his mother went to stay with his great-grandmother (the mother of Berthe Boulanger) in Cholet and subsequently moved to Bordeaux. His father Roger was first mobilized in Luneville, and then joined his parents and his brother-in-law Luc Bouchet in Brive. Jack and his mother also joined them in Brive after the bombing of Bordeaux. Jack Lang's father was sentenced by the court in Brive for failing to report his children as Jews, but was later acquitted by the Court of Appeal on the ground that the children's mother was a Catholic. He had followed the advice of the rabbi of Brive, David Feuerwerker. Roger Lang was nevertheless placed under house arrest. Berthe Bouchet (Boulanger) visited the Langs in April 1942 when her daughter was about to give birth to her third child, Marianne. In 1943, Berthe was arrested in Nancy by the Gestapo for acts of propaganda and resistance. She was deported to Ravensbrück and died in the spring of 1945.

Lang studied political science at the Institut d'Études Politiques de Paris, and went on to receive a postgraduate degree in public law. His career then focused on a combination of teaching and culture and the arts. He was the founder and producer of Festival du Monde in Nancy, was director of the Nancy University Theatre from 1963 to 1972, and then director of the Théâtre national de Chaillot from 1972 to 1974. At the same time he was a professor of international law from 1971 to 1981 at Nancy University and then Paris Nanterre University. He married Monique Buczynski in 1961. The couple have two daughters, one of whom was the actress Valérie Lang. In 1997, Lang was President of the Jury at the 47th Berlin International Film Festival. He is notorious for not paying bills and thus excluded from attending the Cannes film festival since 2020, among other locations.

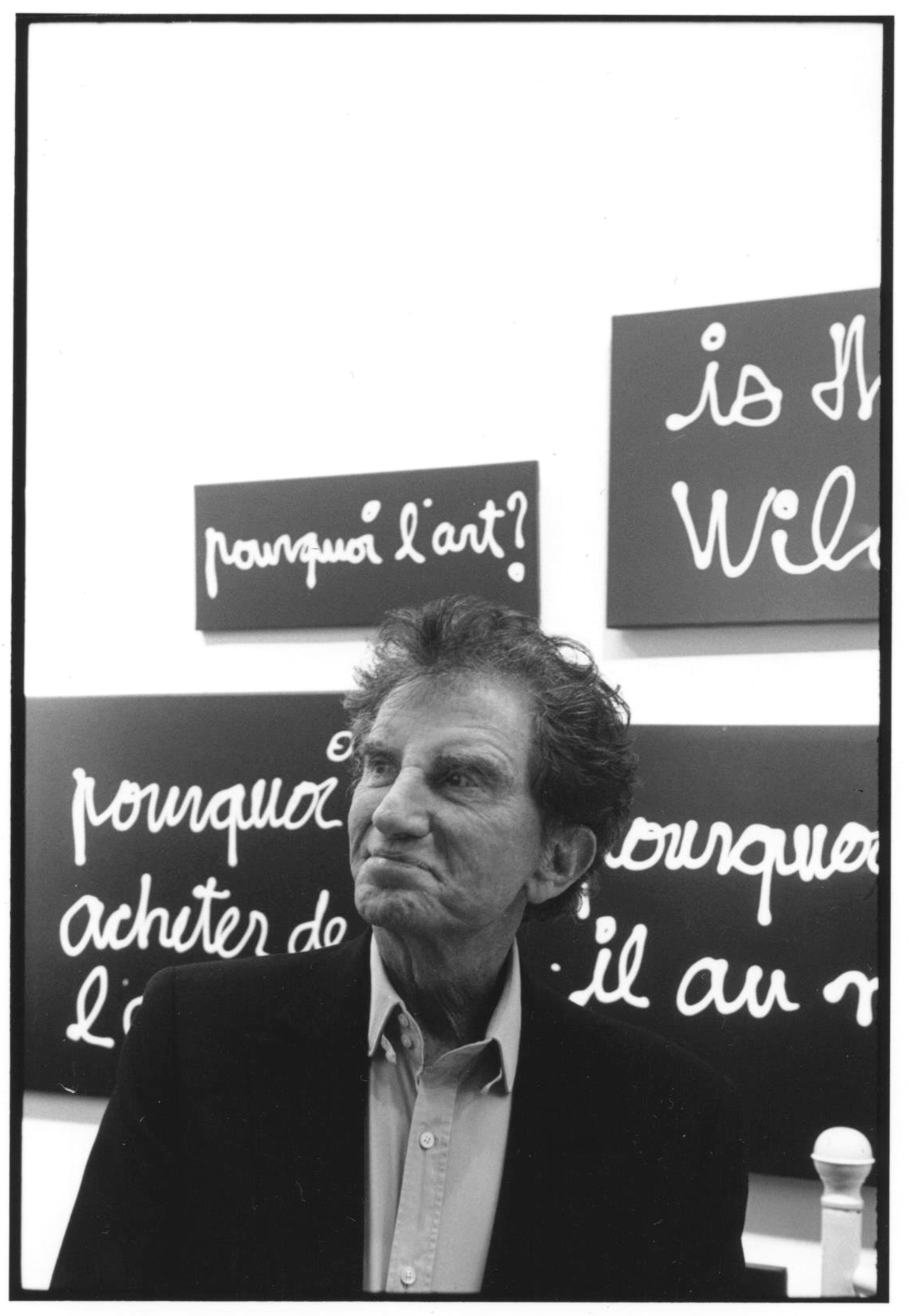
Jack Lang by Olivier Meyer in January 2019

== Politics ==
Lang entered politics as a Socialist member of the National Assembly from Paris in 1977. He is best known for having served as Minister of Culture (22 May 1981 – 19 March 1986 and 13 May 1988 – 29 March 1993) and as Minister of Education (3 April 1992 – 29 March 1993 and 27 March 2000 – 5 May 2002). In 1981, while Minister of Culture, he created the Fête de la Musique, a massive celebration of music held on 21 June each year, where many amateur musicians give free open-air performances. He is the co-founder and president of the Union of the Theatres of Europe. In August 1981, he created the Lang Law, which allows publishers to enforce a minimum sale price for books.

In the 1980s. Lang contributed to the creation of the Europe Theatre Prize, born in 1986, of which he is the President until 2018. Lang was a Member of the European Parliament from 1994 to 1997. In 2000, he stood unsuccessfully for Mayor of Paris. While he had planned to stand for president in 2007, he ultimately decided not to register as a candidate in the Socialist primary for the sake of party unity.

In 2007, Lang agreed to become co-chairman of a commission drafting changes to the Constitution that were supported by President Nicolas Sarkozy but opposed by the Socialist Party. This decision provoked strong criticism from his party, leading him to end his role in the party leadership. When Parliament voted on the constitutional changes on 21 July 2008, he voted in favour, becoming the only Socialist deputy so to do. A three-fifths majority was required, and the changes passed by a vote of 539 to 357, meaning that Lang's support enabled the bill to pass by a one-vote margin. The Socialist Party denounced Lang for this vote; party spokesman Julien Dray said that he had "gone too far" and "no longer has his place in our political family", while Jean-Marc Ayrault, the President of the Socialist Parliamentary Group, said that Lang's vote was an act of "crossing the Rubicon". Lang replied by saying that it "is in nobody's power to strike me from the map of the French political landscape".

In late 2009, Sarkozy appointed Lang his special envoy to North Korea, following a similar assignment earlier in the year to Cuba. Lang travelled to Pyongyang on 9 November 2009 for a self-described "listening mission" aimed at exploring bilateral ties and discussing the North Korean nuclear program, among other things. Lang briefed American officials including Deputy Secretary of State James Steinberg and special envoy Sung Kim, as well as ambassadors of countries involved such as Russia, before the assignment was publicly announced. Some critics questioned Lang's qualifications, but Lang said he would be driven by his "intuition" that change was afoot in North Korea.

In August 2010, Lang became special adviser on piracy at the United Nations. He was brought in to advise on the prosecution of pirates off the coast of Somalia. In 2012, Lang was chosen as the Socialist Party candidate for the National Assembly in the second district in the Vosges department. A controversial figure in the Socialist Party since his collaboration with Sarkozy, Lang's constituency was abolished during the national reapportionment and he failed to be nominated in several other constituencies before finally succeeding in the Vosges. The electorate in this department is considered by observers to be more conservative than in Lang's previous seat. Lang was criticized for being an "outsider", to which he countered that he had been born in the region. Lang was narrowly defeated on the second round of voting in the election on 17 June 2012, winning 49.1% of the vote.

In 2026, it was reported that Lang had a personal relationship with American financier and sex offender Jeffrey Epstein for several years (between 2012 and 2019), and borrowed Epstein's vehicles for his family's use. Lang denied knowing about Epstein's illicit activities. In February 2026, as a financial investigation was opened following the release of the Epstein files, he tendered his resignation as head of the Paris-based Institute of the Arab World, a position he had held since 2013. In an exchange dated 28 January 2013, in response to a document sent by Lang entitled "Petit Prince", Epstein asks: "Should the child should be introduced to religion. new sexuialitys. , tested? how often, standardized tests. sample projects. etc.." [sic] In an email dated 30 January 2013, Caroline Lang replied: "My father agrees with your suggestion on adding religion, new sexuality, etc. ... So I think it would be easier for him to talk to you in person when you come over next [sic] to Paris." Jeffrey Epstein set up an investment fund for Jack Lang and his daughter, funded with $1.9 million and managed by French financier Étienne Binant. Binant was the primary recipient of the money.

== Political career ==
=== Governmental functions ===
- Minister of Culture: 1981–1986.
- Minister of Culture, Communication, Great Works and of the Bicentennial: 1988–1991.
- Minister of Culture and Communication, government spokesman: 1991–1992.
- Minister of State, Minister of National Education and Culture: 1992–1993.
- Minister of National Education: 2000–2002.
- Special envoy to Cuba: February 2009.
- Special envoy to North Korea: November 2009.

=== Electoral mandates ===
European Parliament

- Member of European Parliament: 1994–1997 (Reelected member of the National Assembly of France in 1997). Elected in 1994.

National Assembly of France

- Member of the National Assembly of France for Pas-de-Calais: Since 2002. Elected in 2002, re-elected in 2007.
- Member of the National Assembly of France for Loir-et-Cher: 1986–1988 (Became minister in 1988) / March–December 1993 (Resignation) / 1997–2000 (Became minister in 2000). Elected in 1986, re-elected in 1988, 1993, 1997.

Regional Council

- Vice-president of the Regional Council of Nord-Pas-de-Calais: Since 2004
- Regional councillor of Nord-Pas-de-Calais: Since 2004.
- Regional councillor of Centre: 1992–1998.

General Council

- General councillor of Loir-et-Cher: 1992–1993 (Resignation).

Municipal Council

- Mayor of Blois: 1989–2000 (Resignation). Reelected in 1995.
- Municipal councillor of Blois: 1989–2002 (Resignation). Re-elected in 1995.
- Councillor of Paris 1983–1989.

== Bibliography ==
=== Books ===
- L'État et le théâtre. Paris: Librairie générale de droit et de jurisprudence. 1968.
- Le plateau continental de la mer du Nord : Arrêt de la Cour Internationale de Justice, février 1969 LGDJ bibliothèque de droit international
- Éclats (avec Jean-Denis Bredin), éditions Jean-Claude Simoën, 1978
- Demain, les femmes, Grasset, août 1995
- Lettre à André Malraux, Éditions 1, November 1996
- François Ier, Perrin, octobre 1997
- Les araignées, Pocket, 2000
- La politique, d'où ça vient ? L'origine de l'État, Les fondements de la République, La genèse de l'impôt (avec Odon Vallet et Gaëtan de Séguin des Hons), Flammarion, août 2000
- Qu'apprend-on au collège ? Pour comprendre ce que nos enfants apprennent (avec Claire Bretécher), XO éditions, janvier 2002
- Anna au muséum, Hachette Jeunesse, avril 2002
- Laurent le Magnifique, Perrin, août 2002 ISBN 978-2-262-01608-1
- Une école élitaire pour tous, Gallimard, septembre 2003
- Un nouveau régime politique pour la France, Odile Jacob, août 2004, ISBN 978-2-7381-1566-9
- Nelson Mandela : Leçon de vie pour l'avenir, Perrin, janvier 2005 – ISBN 978-2-262-02194-8
- Changer livre programme pour 2007, Plon, Septembre 2005, ISBN 978-2-259-20359-3
- Immigration positive, avec Hervé Le Bras, Paris, Odile Jacob, 2006, ISBN 978-2-7381-1801-1
- Faire la révolution fiscale, Plon, 2006, ISBN 978-2-259-20460-6
- Demain comme hier, avec Jean-Michel Helvig, Fayard, 2009, ISBN 978-2-213-63846-1
- La bataille du Grand Louvre, éditions Réunions des Musées Nationaux, 2010, ISBN 978-2-7118-5789-0
- Ce que je sais de François Mitterrand, Le Seuil, 2011, ISBN 978-2-02-103793-7
- François Mitterrand : fragments de vie partagée, Le Seuil, 2011 ISBN 978-2-02-103793-7
- Pourquoi ce vandalisme d'État contre l'École : lettre au Président de la République, Éditions du Félin, 2011, ISBN 978-2-86645-765-5

=== Prefaces, forewords and other contributions ===
- Le Gardien des âmes de Alain Roullier (France Europe éditions), 1998.
- 16 ans ou l'avènement de la conscience citoyenne de Adyl Abdelhafidi
- Homosexualité. 10 clés pour comprendre, 20 textes à découvrir de Bruno Perreau (Librio), 2005.
- Mitterrand, Une Affaire d'Amitié, de Stephan-Xavier Trano (L'Archipel), 2006, ISBN 978-2-84187-793-5
- Héritage de Jean Paul Leon (Minedition), 2006, ISBN 978-2-35413-000-8

=== Critical studies and biographies of Lang ===
- Caplan, Lincoln, "M. Le Ministre", The New Yorker 60/47 (7 January 1985) : 18–19
- Jean-Pierre Colin, L'Acteur et le Roi, Georg, 1994 ISBN 978-2-8257-0490-5
- Jean-Pierre Colin, Le Mystère Lang, Georg, 2000 ISBN 978-2-8257-0719-7
- Nicolas Charbonneau, Laurent Guimier, Docteur Jack et Mister Lang, Le Cherche midi, 2004 ISBN 978-2-7491-0189-7
- Marie Delarue, Les Aventures de Lang de Blois, enquêtes, Jacques Granger, 1995 ISBN 978-2-7339-0474-9
- À table avec les politiques, 2005, film documentaire de Frédéric Lepage
- Jean-Louis Toussaint (10 October 2006). Les cahiers de la liberté de l'est. Une réalisation des Editions La Nuée Bleue (ed.). 100 portraits d'hommes et de femmes qui réussissent en dehors des Vosges (in French). Strasbourg. p. 144.
- Edition établie et présentée par Frederic Martel, Jack Lang Une Revolution Culturelle Dits et Écrits Bouquins la collection ISBN 978-2-221-24975-8

Festival de Nancy

- Marie-Ange Rauch, Le théâtre en France en 1968, histoire d'une crise, thèse consacrée à l'histoire du théâtre en France (1945–1972), Nanterre, 1995, 475 pages. Voir chapitre 2 : « les étudiants le théâtre et le Festival de Nancy », pp. 135–143.

As Minister for Culture and Communication

- Laurent Martin, Le prix unique du livre 1981–2006. La loi Lang, coordonné par Laurent Martin, Comité d'histoire du ministère de la Culture et des institutions culturelles – IMEC, collection L'édition contemporaine, 2006, 197 p.
- Laurent Martin, « Oui, le livre a un prix », L'Histoire, number 216, janvier 2007.
- Philippe Poirrier, L'État et la culture en France au XX^{e}, Le Livre de Poche, 2006.
- Michel Schneider, La Comédie de la Culture, Seuil, 1993.

Political offices
Preceded by Lionel Jospin	Minister of Education; 1992–1993	Succeeded by François Bayrou
Preceded by Claude Allègre	Minister of Education; 2000–2002	Succeeded by Luc Ferry
