= Nicolas Charbonneau =

French journalist

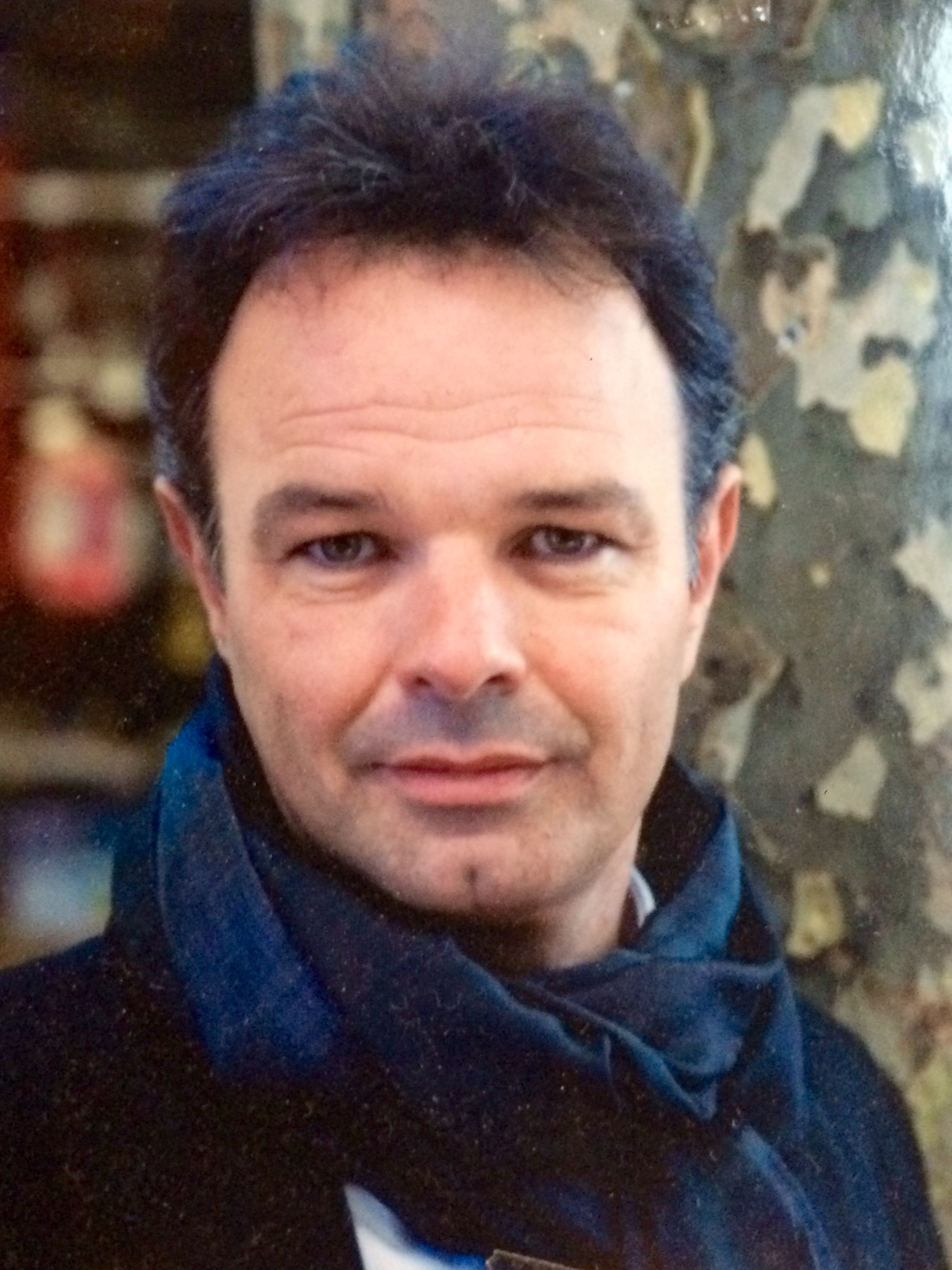
- Nicolas Charbonneau in 2017.
- Born: Chablis

Nicolas Charbonneau is a journalist and French media executive born on December 26, 1967, in Chablis (Yonne). He is currently the editor-in-chief of Le Parisien/Aujourd'hui en France.

He is an administrator and vice-president of the Press Club de France.

== Biography ==
Graduated in sociology of communication and political sociology from the Université Paris-IV-Sorbonne, Nicolas Charbonneau became a senior correspondent at Europe 1, presenter of radio and TV news, chief editor of several media outlets including Le Parisien, and deputy director of Information at the TF1 group.

He was appointed as the deputy director of the editorial staff of Le Parisien/Aujourd'hui en France in August 2017. He was appointed as the director of editorial staff in September 2022.

=== Radio ===
For over 15 years, he covered international events for the radio station Europe 1, such as the genocide in Rwanda, the resumption of nuclear tests in Polynesia, the Kosovo War, famine in Ethiopia, Pinochet's death in Chile, post-Mandela South Africa, the Jolo hostage crisis.

He then presented the morning news on Europe 1 until September 2007.

=== Written press ===
In September 2007, he left Europe 1 to present the 22:00-00:00 slot on the news channel i>Télé., Nicolas Charbonneau was then appointed as the chief editor of i>Télé by Thierry Thuillier.

In April 2009, he was called upon by Marie-Odile Amaury, president of the Amaury group, and Noël Couëdel, then editorial director, to become the chief editor of the daily newspaper Le Parisien/Aujourd'hui en France.

In August 2017, he returned to Le Parisien/Aujourd'hui en France as the deputy director of editorial staff. In September 2022, he became the director of editorial staff.

According to La Lettre A, "his firm takeover of the daily newspaper and his editorials have nonetheless provoked rebellion from part of the editorial staff, who fear a shift in line towards opinion journalism." The Société des journalistes (SDJ) of Le Parisien issued a statement in March 2023 criticizing the newspaper's support for the government's pension reform.

=== Television ===
Starting in 2001, alongside Jérôme Bellay (then president of Europe 1) and Yves Calvi, Nicolas Charbonneau was one of the founders of the program C dans l'air on France 5.

In June 2012, Nonce Paolini, president of TF1, and Catherine Nayl, deputy general director of Information, appointed him as the deputy director of Information at TF1.

From January 2016 to the fall of 2016, he was also the general director of LCI, the news channel of the TF1 group.

== Awards and honours ==
- 1998, winner of the International War Correspondents Prize, Bayeux (radio category)
- 1998, winner of the Prix Varenne de la radio
- 2008, named Knight of the Tastevin
- Vice-president of the Press Club de France

== Publications ==
- Nicolas Charbonneau and Sophie Sachnine, Vos enfants sont formidables, Albin Michel, 2019
- Nicolas Charbonneau and Laurent Guimier, Le Roman des maisons closes, éditions du Rocher, 2010; paperback edition by Litos, 2025
- Nicolas Charbonneau, Le Roman de Saint-Tropez, Du Rocher edition, 2009
- Nicolas Charbonneau and Laurent Guimier, La Ve République pour les nuls, First éditions, 2008
- Nicolas Charbonneau and Laurent Guimier, Le Roi est mort ? Vive le Roi, Michalon edition, 2006
- Nicolas Charbonneau and Laurent Guimier, Génération 69, Michalon edition, 2005
- Nicolas Charbonneau and Laurent Guimier, Docteur Jack et Mister Lang, Le Cherche Midi edition, 2004
- Nicolas Charbonneau, Deux ou trois fois rien, Le Cherche midi edition, 2002

== Documentaries ==
- Le Charles de Gaulle, Deux mois à bord pendant la guerre contre l'Afghanistan, France 5, 2002
- Les magiciens de la lumière, Éclairer des villes, des monuments...de Paris à Shanghai, France 5, 2003
- Les cigognes veillent sur nous, Du PC enterré de Taverny...aux interventions des Mirage 2000, France 5, 2004
