= New York v. Strauss-Kahn =

American criminal case

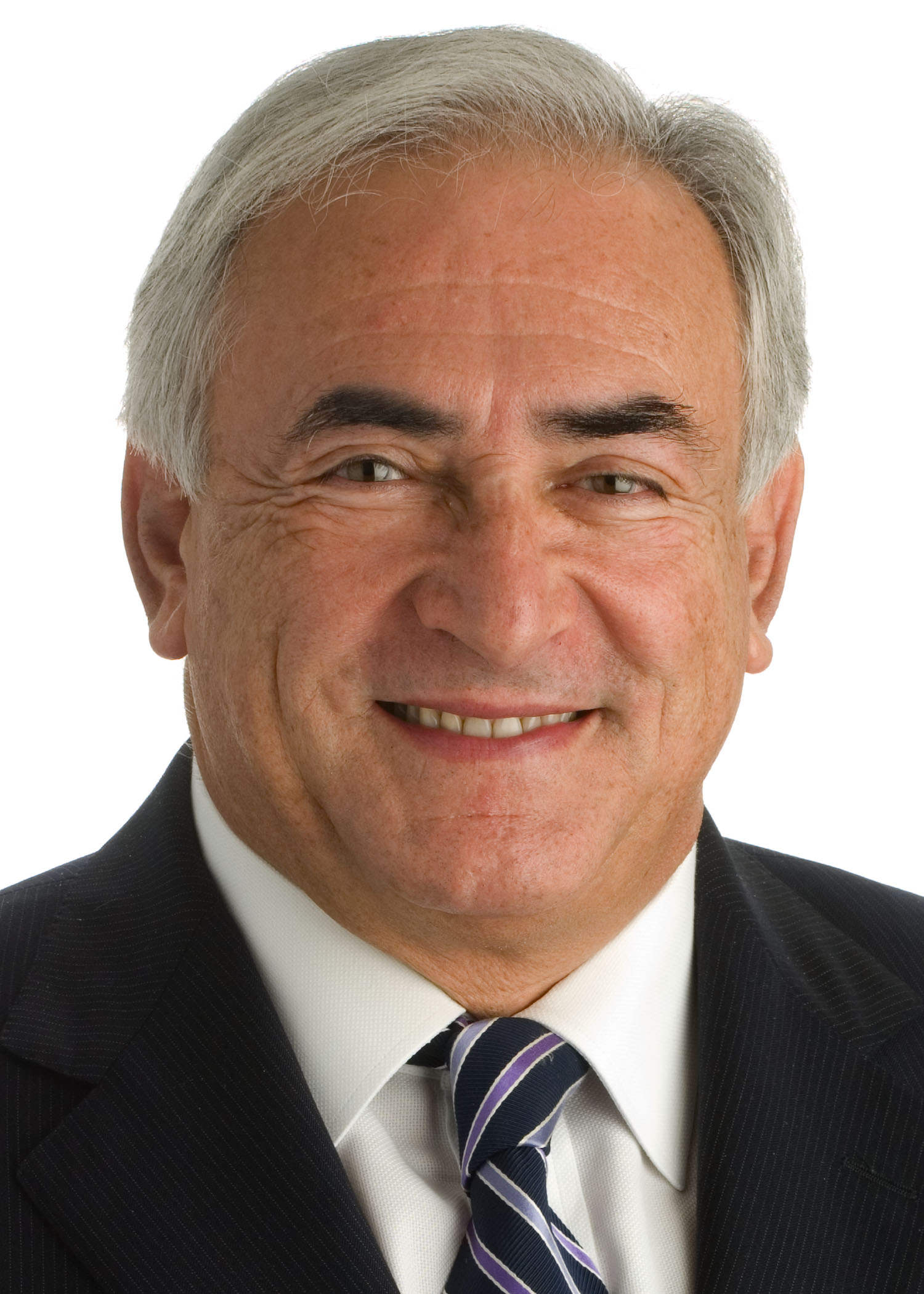
Strauss-Kahn in 2008

The People of the State of New York v. Strauss-Kahn was a criminal case relating to allegations of sexual assault and attempted rape made by a hotel maid, Nafissatou Diallo, against Dominique Strauss-Kahn at the Sofitel New York Hotel on May 14, 2011. On May 19, 2011, Strauss-Kahn was indicted by a grand jury; after posting $1 million bail and pleading not guilty, he was placed under house arrest.

On July 1, 2011, prosecutors told the judge that they had reassessed the strength of their case in the light of the housekeeper's diminished credibility. On August 23, 2011, the judge formally dismissed all charges following a recommendation for dismissal filed by the District Attorney's office, which asserted that the complainant's untruthfulness made it impossible to credit her. At the time of the alleged attack, Strauss-Kahn was the head of the International Monetary Fund (IMF) and a leading candidate in the 2012 French presidential election. Four days after his arrest, he voluntarily resigned his post at the IMF.

== Chronology ==
=== Arrest and indictment ===
On May 14, 2011, Strauss-Kahn was arrested and charged with the sexual assault and attempted rape of 32-year-old Nafissatou Diallo, a housekeeper at the Sofitel New York Hotel in the Manhattan borough earlier that day. After calling the hotel and asking them to bring his missing cell phone to the airport, he was met by police and taken from his Paris-bound flight at New York City's John F. Kennedy International Airport minutes before takeoff. He was later charged on several counts of sexual assault plus unlawful imprisonment. Strauss-Kahn was accused of four felony charges—two of criminal sexual acts (forcing the housekeeper to perform oral sex on him), one of attempted rape and one of sexual abuse—plus three misdemeanor offences, including unlawful imprisonment.

The U.S. State Department determined that Strauss Kahn's diplomatic immunity did not apply to the case.

Strauss-Kahn hired New York lawyer Benjamin Brafman to represent him. He was reported as having sought public relations advice from a Washington-based consulting firm. His defense team hired a private detective agency to investigate the housekeeper's past.

Nafissatou Diallo was represented by Kenneth Thompson and Douglas Wigdor of Thompson Wigdor LLP, a two-partner law firm whose areas of expertise include employment law and civil rights cases. Thompson hired a Paris lawyer to look for women in France who may have been victimized by Strauss-Kahn.

Strauss-Kahn appeared in court on May 16, 2011, before New York City Criminal Court judge Melissa Jackson. During the proceedings the prosecution stated that the housekeeper, Diallo, an immigrant asylee from the West African state of Guinea, had provided a detailed account of the alleged assault, had picked Strauss-Kahn out of a lineup, and that DNA evidence recovered at the site was being tested. Strauss-Kahn, who had earlier agreed to a forensic examination, pleaded not guilty. Judge Jackson denied his bail request stating that the fact that Strauss-Kahn was apprehended on a departing airplane "rais[ed] some concerns".

On May 19, 2011, Strauss-Kahn was indicted by a Manhattan grand jury on seven criminal counts, two of which were first-degree criminal sexual acts, each punishable by a sentence of up to 25 years in prison. On that date New York Supreme Court Justice Michael J. Obus granted Strauss-Kahn's bail request, which was set at $1 million with the additional restrictions of 24-hour home detention and an electronic monitoring ankle bracelet.

After Strauss-Kahn turned over his passport and posted an additional $5 million bail bond, he was placed under house arrest in a residence in Lower Manhattan.

On May 24, 2011, it was reported that DNA tests of the semen found on Diallo's shirt had shown a match with the DNA sample from Strauss-Kahn.

He was arraigned on June 6, 2011, and pleaded not guilty. Outside the court, lawyers for the parties made statements. Benjamin Brafman, for Strauss-Kahn, said: "In our judgment, once the evidence has been reviewed, it will be clear that there was no element of forcible compulsion in this case whatsoever. Any suggestion to the contrary is simply not credible." Kenneth Thompson, Diallo's lawyer, said all of Strauss-Kahn's power, money and influence would not stop the truth from coming out.

=== Prosecution disclosures ===
On June 30, 2011, the district attorney sent a letter to Strauss-Kahn's defense team disclosing information about the housekeeper.

Prosecutors met with Strauss-Kahn's defense team the same day. That evening The New York Times reported the case as being on the verge of collapse and quoted law-enforcement officials as saying investigators had uncovered major holes in the housekeeper's credibility. Following Strauss-Kahn's release on bail the following day, the same paper reported that Diallo had admitted she lied about the events immediately following her encounter with Strauss-Kahn. She had initially said that after the alleged assault she waited in a hallway until Strauss-Kahn had left. She later said she cleaned an adjacent room, and then returned to Strauss-Kahn's room to clean there before reporting to her supervisor that she had been attacked. Among the discoveries were statements by Diallo to investigators differing from what she had put in her asylum application, her claiming to have only one phone while paying hundreds of dollars a month to five phone companies, and individuals, including known felons, depositing almost $100,000 into her bank account over the previous two years.

Also, Diallo told a compelling and detailed story of being gang raped by soldiers in Guinea, which was completely fabricated. Over a two-week period she told the story to prosecutors twice, both times with great emotion, precision, and conviction, including, tears, halting speech, the number and nature of her attackers, pointing out scars that were supposedly from the attack, and how her 2-year old daughter was present. When she finally admitted that the story was fabricated, she at first said that she made up the attack to be consistent with her asylum application. But that too turned out to be untrue—as her asylum application makes no mention of any gang rape.

In addition, the prosecution learned that, the day following the alleged assault, the housekeeper had made a phone call in her native Fula language to her boyfriend in an immigration detention center. The New York Times quoted a law enforcement official as saying that a translation of the call revealed she had used words to the effect of "Don't worry, this guy has a lot of money. I know what I'm doing." Prosecutors said that the conversation, one of at least three they recorded, raised "very troubling" questions about the credibility of the accuser "because she discussed the possible benefits of pursuing charges against a wealthy man." According to The New York Times, the translation of the call "alarmed prosecutors" as being another in a "series of troubling statements." After obtaining the recorded audio from the call, the accuser's attorney countered that it was the inmate who expressed fear about the financial power of DSK and Nafissatou merely dismissed his fears by saying that her lawyer knew what he was doing.

Thompson, the accuser's attorney, challenged the prosecutors' handling and interpretation of the phone call and asked them to withdraw and appoint a special prosecutor. The prosecutors declined to recuse their office, saying Thompson's request was without merit.

=== Subsequent events ===
The morning after the prosecution's disclosures, in a brief court hearing in which prosecutors said they had reassessed the strength of their case, Strauss-Kahn was released from house arrest on his own recognizance without bail. His passport remained surrendered although he was free to travel within the US. After the hearing, Kenneth Thompson, the housekeeper's attorney, defended his client: "It's a fact that the victim here has made some mistakes, but that doesn't mean she's not a rape victim."

The next scheduled hearing was postponed twice, from July 18 to August 1, 2011, and then again to August 23, with prosecutors saying that they needed more time for further investigation and defense saying they hoped it would lead to a dismissal of charges.

==== Civil lawsuits ====
On August 8, 2011, Diallo filed a civil action against Strauss-Kahn in the Supreme Court of the State of New York, County of Bronx. On May 15, 2012, a few days after the French election for president, Strauss-Kahn filed a countersuit against Diallo for making "baseless accusations that had cost him his job as managing director of the International Monetary Fund and 'other professional opportunities'." Until his arrest, Strauss-Kahn was considered to be a likely candidate to run against the incumbent president, Nicolas Sarkozy.

Diallo's lawsuit was settled, together with Strauss-Kahn's countersuit, for an undisclosed amount on December 10, 2012. A separate suit against the New York Post, who had reported she was a prostitute, was settled at the same time. Diallo's attorney, Kenneth Thompson, described Diallo as a strong and courageous woman who had never lost faith in the American system of justice. Previous news reports emanating from Le Monde that Strauss-Kahn was settling for $6 million were denied by both parties.

Le Journal du Dimanche (JDD) later reported the settlement as for $1.5 million, of which Diallo received a little less than $1 million after fees. JDD noted that negotiations between the parties had commenced after an application for diplomatic immunity by Strauss-Kahn had been rejected by the judge. Settling the suit meant that Strauss-Kahn avoided a long and humiliating examination in court.

=== Dismissal of case ===
On August 22, 2011, prosecutors filed a recommendation for dismissal of all charges against Strauss-Kahn. They told the court that inconsistencies in the accuser's testimony led to the decision to recommend all charges be dropped. Their decision to drop the case was based on a number of facts outlined in a 25-page document:

- The physical evidence indicated a sexual encounter but did not prove use of force or non-consent;
- The prosecution noted multiple instances of the accuser's untruthfulness, including fabricating the story that she was gang raped in her native Guinea to gain asylum in the U.S. (although her asylum application did not include it);
- Changing her version of the events before, during, and after the alleged assault.

Consequently, prosecutors stated they could no longer believe Diallo beyond a reasonable doubt, and could not expect any jury to do so either. Diallo's attorney, Kenneth Thompson, publicly attacked DA Vance, claiming that Vance's office had been abusive to their client, had leaked false information, and sought to undermine Diallo's credibility; he requested a stay in the case which was later denied.

On August 23, 2011, all charges against Strauss-Kahn were dismissed as requested by the prosecution. He returned to Paris on September 3, 2011. On September 9, 2011, the accuser's attorney filed a civil suit against Strauss-Kahn in New York City, followed weeks later by a motion for dismissal by Strauss-Kahn.

On September 18, 2011, Strauss-Kahn was interviewed on French TV. He conceded that his encounter with Diallo in New York had been an error and a moral failure, but denied it was a criminal act. He accused Diallo of lying about the encounter.

== Conspiracy hypothesis ==
In an interview with Libération on April 28, 2011, Strauss-Kahn stated he was "worried his political opponent, Nicolas Sarkozy, would try to frame him with a fake rape". Paris politician and advocate of gender equality Michèle Sabban said she was convinced there was an international plot to frame him. A few days after his arrest, a poll showed that 57% of the French public believed he was the "victim of a smear campaign".

On May 15, 2011, Strauss-Kahn's political opponent Henri de Raincourt, a minister for overseas co-operation in the ruling UMP party, stated, "one cannot exclude thinking about a setup." Russian Prime Minister Vladimir Putin expressed his personal doubts about the allegations.

On November 27, 2011, investigative journalist Edward Jay Epstein presented a minute-by-minute documentation of events, published in The New York Review of Books, which involved the alleged assault, making a number of new allegations. An analysis of hotel door key and phone records tracing links to Strauss-Kahn's potential political rivals appeared to suggest the possibility that he had been set up. However the hotel where the alleged assault took place firmly rebuffed Epstein's suggestions of a conspiracy theory, denying a number of assertions in the report. The New York Review of Books subsequently corrected one of its allegations, reporting that a "dance of celebration" between two Sofitel employees lasted 13 seconds, not the 3 minutes originally reported, an issue that had been raised by Amy Davidson in her The New Yorker examination of Epstein's piece. Epstein later wrote that Strauss-Kahn now accepts that his enemies might not have set up his encounter with Diallo, but believes they did play a role, through intercepted phone calls, in making sure that the hotel maid went to the police, turning a private tryst into a public scandal.

== Support and opposition ==
Strauss-Kahn's wife, Anne Sinclair, was in Paris when he was arrested. A week after the arrest, on May 21, 2011, she said: "I don't believe for a single second the accusations of sexual assault by my husband." Friends of the couple said their 20-year-old marriage remained strong despite the new strains and that the allegations were unlikely to separate them.

While he was considered a womanizer and described by Le Journal du Dimanche as un grand séducteur ("a great seducer"), a number of close friends said the allegations were out of character.

His previous wife, Brigitte Guillemette, insisted that violence was not part of his temperament and that the allegations were "unthinkable and impossible". The Spanish writer Carmen Llera, a former lover, defended him in an open letter, declaring "violence is not part of his culture." This conclusion is supported by Strauss-Kahn's biographer who claims that he was a "typical French lover, but he's not able to rape a woman."

Journalist and essayist Jean-François Kahn apologized for initially characterizing the allegations as a troussage de domestique (literally, stripping or having casual, forced sex with a servant) and said he would retire from journalism. Marine Le Pen, leader of the Front National, said "I am utterly unsurprised...everyone in the Paris political village knew of Dominique Strauss-Kahn's pathologic relations with women", and criticised both the ruling UMP and Socialist parties for ignoring his flaws. Bernard Debré, a UMP member of the National Assembly of France, described Strauss-Kahn's behaviour as a humiliation for France.

== Reactions ==
French politicians were quick to respond, as were their counterparts in the rest of Europe. The case prompted response from feminists in both the US and France, who criticised French coverage of the allegations and apparent dismissal of the woman's claims. The reaction led to a rally at the Pompidou Centre on May 22, 2011. French sociologist Irène Théry published two articles in Le Monde commenting on the affair and defending French feminism against American attacks.

In response to the allegations, Unite Here, the biggest union in the hospitality industry, said that hotels should provide sexual harassment training for workers. When Strauss-Kahn appeared in court on June 6, 2011, a group of room attendants, members of the New York Hotel Trades Council (NYHTC), arrived on a bus arranged by the union and demonstrated in front of the courtroom.

=== Media coverage after arrest ===
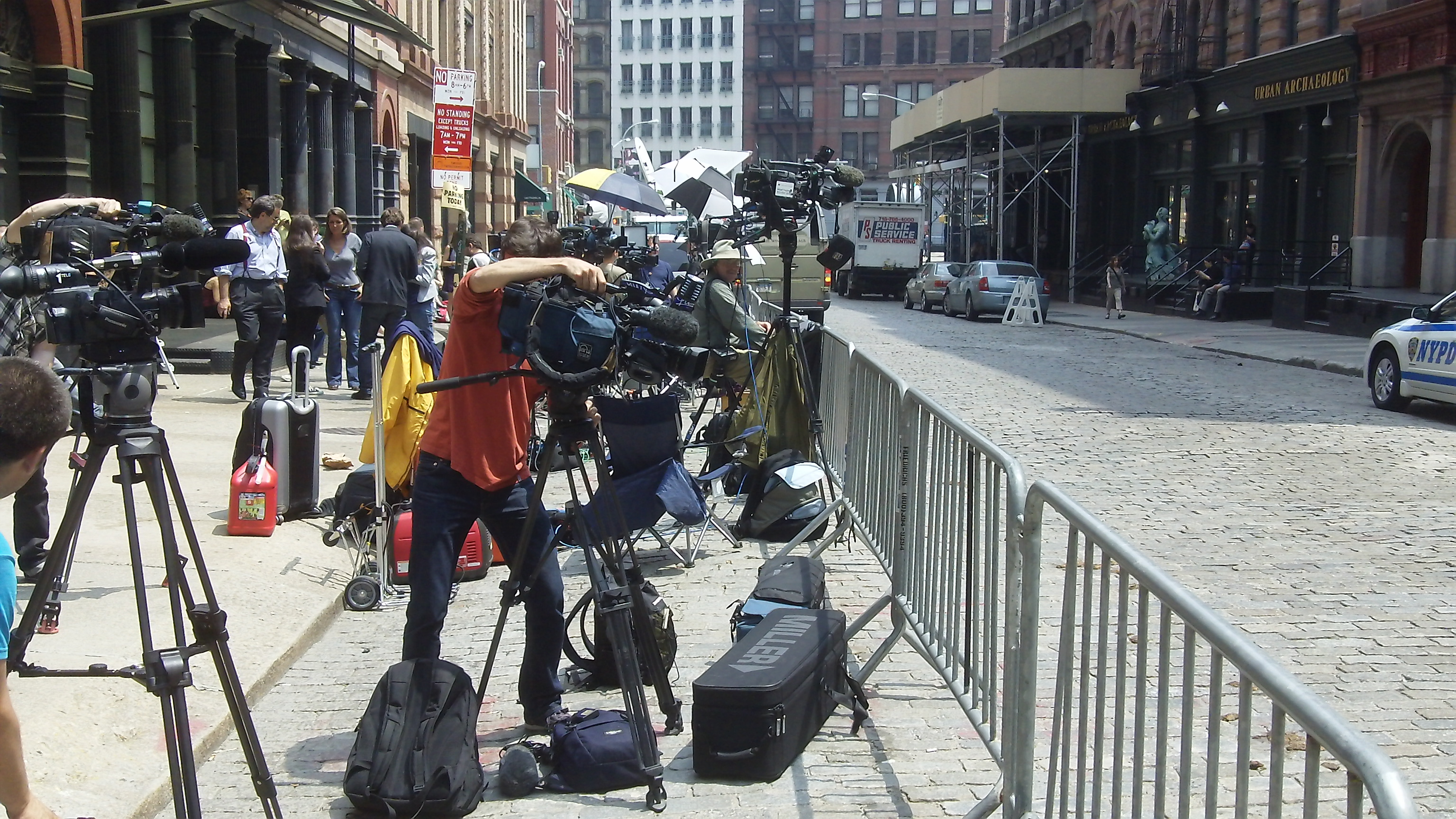
Media circus in front of Strauss-Kahn's apartment

CBS News noted that a media circus had begun because the case involved three elements of viewer interest: sex, politics, and money. The media impact of the case after the arrest was measured by the French media analysis firm Kantar Media. They found that during the first ten days of the scandal, 'DSK' appeared on the front page of more than 150,000 newspapers around the world.

On 17 May 17, 2011, Paris Match published the name of the housekeeper in a piece which included appraisals of her attractiveness. Other French newspapers quickly followed suit in naming her, eventually adding photos and details of her private life.

On June 14, 2011, The New York Times followed the lead begun by other anglophone media in running an "unusually extensive" story on the housekeeper's background, while continuing to withhold her name. In the United States, the media does not normally identify by name persons making an accusation of rape.

Dominique Strauss-Kahn being perp-walked by New York City police
- Image of Strauss-Kahn with his hands behind his back accompanied by police detectives on either side

Former French justice minister Élisabeth Guigou, architect of a 2000 law on the presumption of innocence, said she found the televised images of Strauss-Kahn prior to the preliminary bail proceedings absolutely disgusting and described the coverage as a pre-trial indictment. Jack Lang, a former Minister of Culture and Minister of Education, described the published images of Strauss-Kahn as a lynching and wondered why Strauss-Kahn had not been granted bail at his first application since, according to Lang, the case was not that serious. He later apologised.

Hugh Schofield of the BBC reported that Strauss-Kahn's arrest and incarceration had provoked a national trauma in France far deeper than anyone could have imagined: images of Strauss-Kahn's post-arrest perp walk had "reawakened an anti-Americanism that is latent in many French souls. ... such humiliating pictures would never be taken in France – indeed the French law on the presumption of innocence bans 'degrading photographs of prisoners awaiting trial.'" Bernard-Henri Lévy, the French philosopher and media intellectual, declared that Strauss-Kahn had already been found guilty in the court of public opinion.

Following his release from house arrest on July 1, 2011, The New York Times, among other media, speculated as to whether he could revive his political career. In France, Michèle Sabban asked that the ongoing French Socialist Party presidential primary be suspended to discuss the possibility of Strauss-Kahn's participation.

=== Reactions to the dropping of all charges ===
In March 2012, students at Cambridge University in the UK protested against Strauss-Kahn being allowed to speak on campus. Because of the original charges and the maid's allegations, a campus women's group opposed his visit, with 750 students signing a petition to withdraw his invitation.

In defending their decision to invite him, the president of the Cambridge Union Society explained that "we can't engage in any kind of judgement on people," while a university spokesperson added that the university "respects academic freedom and freedom of speech." A student protester who was interviewed defended the protests, saying "... we wanted to exercise our own freedom of speech as individuals and let the union know what we think."

== Resignation and impact ==
=== Economic ===
Strauss-Kahn resigned from his position as head of the IMF on May 18, 2011. In his letter of resignation he denied "with the greatest possible firmness all of the allegations". He said he wanted to protect the IMF and devote all his energies to proving his innocence. On June 14, 2011, the IMF announced two candidates had been shortlisted for the post of managing director of the IMF. These were Agustín Carstens, governor of the Mexican central bank, and Christine Lagarde, French finance minister. On June 28, 2012, the IMF announced they had selected Lagarde.

His sudden resignation led the IMF to search for a replacement and created new political worries. According to The Washington Post, "Without Strauss-Kahn at the helm, Europe is at risk of losing a key source of financial support in its efforts to contain the debt crisis buffeting the continent", including potential financial bailouts for nations such as Greece and Portugal. U.S. economist Joseph Stiglitz agreed, stressing that because Strauss-Kahn was "an impressive leader of the IMF and re-established the credibility of the institution," the choice of his replacement was important, otherwise "the gains of the institution could easily be lost."

According to The Economist magazine, before Strauss-Kahn became head of the IMF, the fund's relevance to global finance was in question. However, his early endorsement of fiscal stimulus for the Eurozone during its financial crisis had been accepted and acted upon, with new contributions to the fund being tripled in size. "The Greeks trusted him", it notes, and he was "one of the few non-German policymakers to have had influence over Angela Merkel ... Whatever his personal failings, [he] was an outstanding head of the IMF." In addition, he had championed the need to protect poor countries from the effects of fiscal austerity, helping the IMF become "kinder and gentler" to less developed countries. As a result of his arrest, the IMF was in "turmoil", and the choice of his replacement became "more urgent and more complicated."

=== Political ===
Though he had not officially declared his candidacy, Strauss-Kahn had been expected to be a leading candidate for the 2012 French Presidency for the Socialist Party. Preliminary polling suggested he was favored to defeat the incumbent, Nicolas Sarkozy, but his arrest left the party unsure how to proceed. On June 28, 2011, party leader Martine Aubry announced her candidacy for the presidency, joining François Hollande and Ségolène Royal amongst party contenders. Strauss-Kahn endorsed Aubry's candidacy. François Hollande was elected the Socialist Party presidential candidate on October 16, 2011.

=== Popular culture ===
The 2011 Law & Order: Special Victims Unit episode "Scorched Earth" is based upon Strauss-Kahn's arrest. The case also inspired the 2014 French film Welcome to New York, co-written and directed by Abel Ferrara and starring Gérard Depardieu and Jacqueline Bisset. Following the film's release (to mixed reviews varying from high praise to outright disgust) on May 17, 2014, Strauss-Kahn said he would sue for slander. His lawyer also complained the portrayal of his then wife Anne Sinclair was antisemitic.

The 2013 short film, Aissa's Story, is based on Nafissatou Diallo's account of being raped by Strauss-Kahn. Aissa's Story is directed by Iquo Essien and has won numerous short/independent film awards.

In December 2020, a four-part documentary was released on Netflix, Room 2806: The Accusation, directed by Jalil Lespert.

Chimamanda Ngozi Adichie wrote that Kadiatou's storyline in her 2025 novel Dream Count was partly inspired by the case.
