= Yves Michaud (philosopher) =

French philosopher (born 1944)

Yves Michaud (born 11 July 1944) is a French philosopher. As a student, he studied philosophy and science at École Normale Supérieure and the Sorbonne in Paris. His early research involved the study of political violence and empiricism, especially the works of John Locke and David Hume. He was Director of the École nationale supérieure des Beaux-Arts from 1989 to 1997. In 2000, Michaud partnered with Jean-Jacques Aillagon to establish the Université de tous les savoirs (University of all knowledge), a French government initiative to disseminate information on new scientific advances.

Michaud has published widely on the relationships of the arts and culture in a globalized, technological world. In 2007 Le Figaro published his article entitled "Ce nouveau fondamentalisme moral qui menace la société française".

== Works by Michaud ==
- Violence et politique, 1978
- Hume et la fin de la philosophie, 1983
- La Violence, PUF, coll. « Que sais-je ? », 1986
- Locke, 1986; réimpr. 1998
- Enseigner l'art ? : analyses et réflexions sur les écoles d'art, Nîmes, 1993
- La Crise de l'art contemporain, 1997
- Changements dans la violence : essai sur la bienveillance et sur la peur, 2002
- Précis de recomposition politique : des incivismes à la française et de quelques manières d'y remédier, Paris, Climats, 2002, réimpr. 2006
- L'Art à l'état gazeux : essai sur le triomphe de l'esthétique, 2003
- Université de tous les savoirs : le renouvellement de l'observation dans les sciences, 2004
- Chirac dans le texte, la parole et l'impuissance, 2004
- Humain, inhumain, trop humain : réflexions philosophiques sur les biotechnologies, la vie et la conservation de soi à partir de l'œuvre de Peter Sloterdijk, Paris, Climats, 2006
- L'artiste et les commissaires : quatre essais non pas sur l'art contemporain mais sur ceux qui s'en occupent, Paris, Hachette, 2007
- Qu'est-ce que le mérite ?, Bourin éditeur, 2009
- Ibiza mon amour; enquête sur l'industrialisation du plaisir, NiL editions, 2012
- Narcisse et ses avatars, Broché, 2014

== Prizes and decorations ==
- Chevalier de la Légion d'honneur
- Ordre des Arts et des Lettres

== See also ==
- Université de tous les savoirs
