= Pierre Musso =

French philosopher and historian of technology

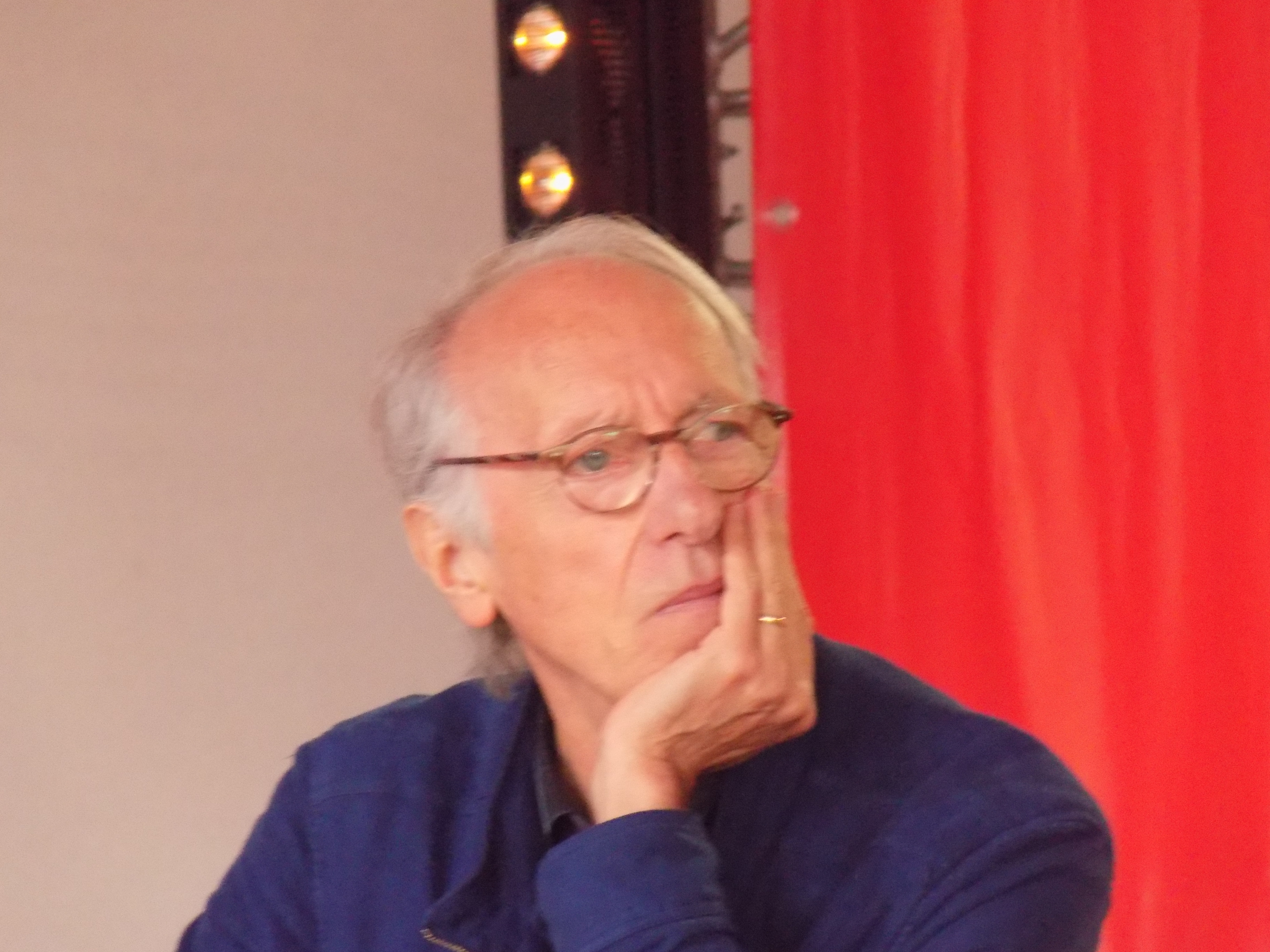
- Pierre Musso in 2019
- Born: September 8, 1950 (age 76)
- Occupations: Philosopher and historian of technology

Education
- Education: ENST, Panthéon-Sorbonne University (Ph.D)

Pierre Musso (born 1950) is a French philosopher and historian of technology.

== Life ==
Musso studied philosophy at the École nationale supérieure des postes, télégraphes et téléphones (ENSPTT), before gaining a Ph.D. in political science at University of Paris 1 Panthéon-Sorbonne. Supervised by Lucien Sfez, his thesis dealt with the ideal of the telecommunications network in the thought of Henri Saint-Simon and his followers.

Musso then undertook research at the Centre national d'études des télécommunications (CNET) and led several research departments at France Télécom. He became a lecturer at Paris 1, and is today a professor of Information and Communication Sciences at the University of Rennes 2 and at Télécom Paris.

== Works ==
- Télécommunications et philosophie des réseaux la postérité paradoxale de Saint-Simon. Paris: Presses universitaires de France, 1997.
- Saint-Simon et le saint-simonisme. Paris: Presses universitaires de France, 1999.
- (ed. with Yves Crozet and Guy Joignaux) Le territoire aménagé par les réseaux : énergie, transports et télécommunications. La Tour d'Aigues: Editions de l'Aube, 2002.
- (ed. with Christel Alvergne) Les grands textes de l'aménagement du territoire et de la décentralisation. Paris : La Documentation française, 2003.
- Critique des réseaux. Paris: Presses universitaires de France, 2003.
- (ed.) Réseaux et société. Paris: Presses universitaires de France, 2003.
- (with Laurent Ponthou and Éric Seulliet) Fabriquer le futur 2: l'imaginaire au service de l'innovation. Paris: Village Mondial, 2005.
- (ed. with Alain Graz) Politique, communication et technologies : mélanges en hommage à Lucien Sfez. Paris: Presses universitaires de France, 2006.
- Le sarkoberlusconisme. La Tour-d'Aigues: Éd. de l'Aube, 2008.
- (ed with Christel Alvergne) L'aménagement du territoire en images. Paris: La Documentation française, 2009.
