= Atlantico =

French news website

Atlantico is a French news website. Founded on 28 February 2011 amid much media attention, it quickly attracted notice for scoops related to scandals involving the Socialist politician and International Monetary Fund head, Dominique Strauss-Kahn.

== History ==
The website is inspired by the American websites The Huffington Post and The Daily Beast. It characterises its editorial position as "[classical] liberal and independent", while other French media have associated it with the right wing of the French political spectrum, a label rejected by Atlantico.

51% of Atlantico's stock of one million euro is held by its founders, the journalists Jean-Sébastien Ferjou, Pierre Guyot, Loïc Rouvin and Igor Daguier; and the remaining 49% by "Free Minds", a group of investors that includes Arnaud Dassier, a former campaign adviser to President Nicolas Sarkozy. As of 2011, the site does not charge for access and is financed through advertisements. Its staff of about ten journalists also includes Gilles Klein, Anita Hausser, Christian de Villeneuve and Yves Derai. Among its regular contributors are the writers Chantal Delsol, Paul-Marie Coûteaux, Gérard de Villiers, Guy Sorman and Tristane Banon.
