= Room 2806: The Accusation =

- Genre: Documentary
- Starring: Nafissatou Diallo; Raphaëlle Bacqué; Élisabeth Guigou
- Country of origin: France
- Original language: French
- No. of seasons: 1
- No. of episodes: 4

Production
- Running time: 44–63 minutes

Original release
- Network: Netflix
- Release: 7 December 2020

Room 2806: The Accusation is a 2020 French docuseries starring Nafissatou Diallo, Raphaëlle Bacqué and Élisabeth Guigou.

== Cast ==
- Nafissatou Diallo
- Raphaëlle Bacqué
- Élisabeth Guigou
- Paul Browne
- Ben Brafman
- William Taylor
- Olivier Blanchard
- Delrene Boyd
- Michael Osgood
- Larry McShane
- John Sheehan
- Laurent Azoulai
- Edward Jay Epstein
- Robert Davis
- Yves Magnan
- Alain Hamon
- Tristane Banon
- Robert Mooney
- Jack Lang
- Sonia Ossorio

== Episodes ==
No.	Title	Original release date
1	"Episode 1"	December 7, 2020
After the 2008 financial crisis, a French politician provides hope. Later, he becomes the subject of a 2011 scandal in New York City.
2	"Episode 2"	December 7, 2020
Following Nafissatou Diallo's allegations against Dominique Strauss-Kahn, he is taken into custody. Reports of an alleged affair years prior emerge.
3	"Episode 3"	December 7, 2020
Another woman comes forward with accusations as public opinions clash around Strauss-Kahn. The accused resigns as head of IMF before he is granted bail.
4	"Episode 4"	December 7, 2020
More allegations of sexual misconduct surface as doubts swirl around Strauss-Kahn's case and Diallo faces scrutiny in her pursuit of justice.

== Release ==
Room 2806: The Accusation was released on December 7, 2020, on Netflix.
