= Catherine Nayl =

French journalist

- Born: December 12, 1960 (age 65); Montreuil
- Education: CELSA Sorbonne University
- Occupations: Journalist, Television director
- Employer(s): France Inter (since 2017); TF1 Group
- Awards: Ordre national du Mérite (2010); Legion of Honour (2018)

Catherine Nayl is a French journalist and presenter, born on December 12, 1960. Most notably, she worked for TF1 from 1984 to 2017.

== Biography ==
Catherine Nayl was born on 12 December 1960.

After studying journalism at CELSA Sorbonne University, Catherine Nayl began her career at TF1 as a reporter in 1984. She is not widely known to French viewers for having briefly served as a presenter three times in the 1990s on TF1: the 11 PM news in the summer of 1990, the news program à la une in 1993, and she also served as a fill-in for Claire Chazal presenting weekend news broadcasts in the summer of 1998. After being editor-in-chief of the 1 PM news program with Jean-Pierre Pernaut, and then head of reports for the TF1 television channel, she became director of editorial content when Jean-Claude Dassier took over the news division in June 2008.

In June 2009, following the official announcement of Jean-Claude Dassier's departure, she was appointed Director of News at TF1 and was responsible for the editorial thematic units. She then became Deputy General Director in charge of news for the TF1 group. She left her position at the end of September 2017. On December 22, 2017, she was appointed Director of News for France Inter, replacing Jean-Marc Four.

== Decorations ==
- Chevalier de la Légion d'honneur (14 July 2018)
