= Laurent Guimier =

French journalist

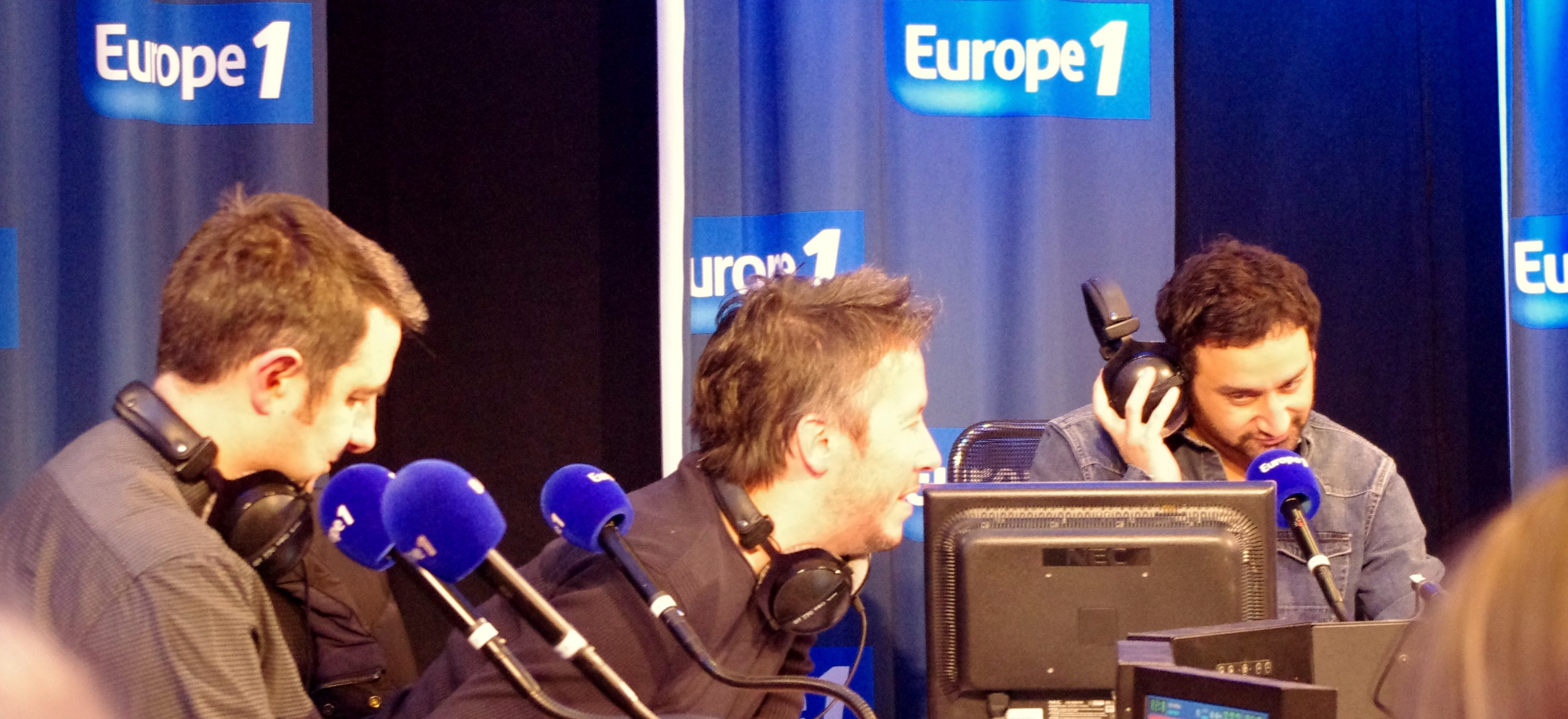
- Laurent Guimier on the left in the show Les Pieds dans le plat hosted by Cyril Hanouna on Europe 1 in 2014.
- Born: March 31, 1971 (age 55); Lisieux (Calvados, France)
- Citizenship: French
- Education: Centre de formation des journalistes Sciences Po
- Occupations: Director of CMA Média and President of CA de La Provence
- Employer(s): Europe 1 (1994-2006); Europe 1 (2008-2014); France Info (radio network) (2014-2017); Radio France (2017-2018); Europe 1 (2018-2019); France Télévisions (2020-2023); CMA Média (2023-)

Laurent Guimier (born March 31, 1971, in Lisieux) is a French journalist. He spent most of his career at Europe 1, holding various positions between 1994 and 2014, including reporter, interviewer, correspondent, editor-in-chief, news director, host, and columnist.

After spending four years at Radio France as the director of France Info from 2014 to 2017, he returned to Lagardère Active Group to serve as vice-president and general director of Europe 1, of RFM, and of Virgin Radio from 2018 to 2019. From September 2020 to September 2022, he was the news director of France Télévision.

In March 2023, he took over the leadership of CMA Média, created by Rodolphe Saadé. The journalist, who left his post as news director of France Télévisions in October 2022, now leads the shipping company CMA CGM's media division CMA Média. In May 2023, he simultaneously became chairman of the board of directors for the newspaper La Provence.

== Biography ==
Laurent Guimier was born on March 31, 1971, in Lisieux.

His father was the director of the tourist office in Lisieux. Laurent Guimier graduated from Sciences Po Paris in 1992 and from the CFJ in 1994.

He began his radio career in 1987 at Cocktail FM (now Radio Cristal), a local station in Lisieux, Calvados.

In 1994, he joined Europe 1 as a general news reporter and later worked in the political and society departments. From 1998 to 2003, he conducted daily interviews during the radio's morning show. He served as a correspondent for Europe 1 in the Aquitaine region from 2003 to 2005, followed by a year as the editor-in-chief of the radio's morning news segment in 2005.

He left Europe 1 in September 2006 to lead the newsroom of Le Figaro's digital site, under the supervision of Nicolas Beytout, director of editorial content for the Le Figaro group. Initially, LeFigaro.fr had a modest audience, but it became the leading general news site, surpassing LeMonde.fr for the first time in June 2008, according to Médiamétrie/Netratings results. Under the direction of Étienne Mougeotte, the new director of editorial content for Le Figaro group, he developed and presented Talk Orange Le Figaro, the first daily political web show, alternating with Anne Fulda.

Guimier returned to Europe 1 in July 2008 as the director of the newsroom, appointed by Alexandre Bompard, president of the station, replacing Benoît Duquesne. He reorganized the newsroom and the three news segments, featuring new personalities such as Patrick Cohen, Marie Drucker, and Marc-Olivier Fogiel. He left the newsroom in May 2010 after seven consecutive positive audience ratings for the news segments, but remained with the Lagardère Group.

He joined the digital editorial team as deputy managing director to oversee Lagardère Active's news websites (europe1.fr, lejdd.fr, parismatch.com), and also coordinated Lagardère Active's digital news efforts.

In January 2012, he was appointed director of digital information for the news division of Lagardère Active, which includes Europe 1, Le Journal du Dimanche, and Paris Match. In this role, he oversaw the editorial direction of sites such as europe1.fr, lejdd.fr, parismatch.com, and lelab.europe1.fr. On-air at Europe 1, he hosted Des clics et des claques from Monday to Thursday from 8 pm to 9 pm starting in late August 2011, focusing on internet and digital social network news. Since January 2012, he has also presented the Tout est Dit segment from Monday to Friday at 8:34 am, highlighting key political quotes. In June 2012, he left the Des clics et des claques show on Europe 1.

Still in charge of digital news, he has been participating since September 2012 in the morning segment hosted by Bruce Toussaint on Europe 1, where he presents a fact-checking segment titled Vrai-faux de l'info about significant statements reported in the media. He also appears during special events broadcast by the station, specifically for the "Grand forums." On these occasions, the live radio program is extended online.

Starting August 26, 2013, he became a columnist on the radio show Les Pieds dans le plat hosted by Cyril Hanouna and broadcast on Europe 1. He also served as a columnist from October to December 2013 on the short-lived early evening show Jusqu'ici tout va bien broadcast on France 2 and hosted by Sophia Aram.

On May 7, 2014, he left the show Les Pieds dans le plat hosted by Cyril Hanouna. On May 9, he announced his departure from Europe 1 at the end of his last segment on Thomas Sotto's morning show. He was replaced by Anne Le Gall for the remainder of the season.

On May 12, 2014, he was appointed director of the public station France Info by Mathieu Gallet, president of Radio France. "My mission is to make it the reference news channel again. And a comprehensive media outlet, both on air, online, and on mobile platforms." With 7.9% audience share in September–October 2016, the radio station had its best start since 2014. To turn around the struggling station, he eliminated more than half of its 90 weekly segments and gave greater emphasis to immediate news updates, with more frequent headlines.

On May 17, 2017, Mathieu Gallet announced that he would become the number two at Radio France, replacing Frédéric Schlesinger (who was heading to Europe 1). Guimier thus became "deputy director of broadcast and content." On May 11, 2018, Radio France announced his departure.

On May 16, 2018, the press reported that he would become the new vice-president of Europe 1, RFM, and Virgin Radio, taking effect on May 22, 2018.

On November 15, 2018, following the publication of Médiamétrie figures confirming Europe 1's drop in ratings, he warned that "it will take a very long time. There is no visible rebound yet." However, Guimier denied any plans for a restructuring plan or the sale of Europe 1 by Lagardère Active group.

In early July 2019, he announced his departure from Europe 1 after just thirteen months at the helm of the radio station and a very negative balance sheet. His tenure at Europe 1 was indeed marked by a decline in ratings. In the final weeks, he had already been temporarily replaced following an injury at the Stade de France during the 2018–19 Coupe de France final between Paris Saint-Germain and Stade Rennais. Constance Benqué, who had been acting as his interim, succeeds him at Europe 1.

In 2020, Guimier rejoined France Télévisions, initially as the director of the France Info channel and then as the news director. In November 2021, he was announced as Thomas Sotto's successor to interview candidates for the 2022 French presidential election alongside Léa Salamé on behalf of public service broadcasting, continuing a tradition of news directors appearing on the main political show of the channel, like Arlette Chabot or Olivier Mazerolle before him.

On October 3, 2022, Guimier was replaced by Alexandre Kara as the news director of France Télévisions following, among other incidents, a vote of no confidence by journalists in June 2022.

On March 6, 2023, he took over the media department of CMA CGM, a shipping company led by Rodolphe Saadé that is increasingly active in media activities.

On May 10, 2023, the board of directors of La Provence approved Guimier's appointment as its new head. The group belongs to CMA CGM.

== Career ==
- 1987: Collaborator at Cocktail FM (local radio station in Lisieux)
- 1994-1998: Reporter at Europe 1
- 1998-2003: Morning show interviewer at Europe 1
- 2003-2005: Regional correspondent for Europe 1 in Aquitaine
- 2005: Editor-in-chief of the morning show at Europe 1
- 2008-2010: Editor-in-chief of Europe 1
- 2011-2012: Host of the daily show Des clics et des claques on Europe 1
- 2012-2014: Daily political columnist on the morning show at Europe 1
- 2012-2014: Daily media columnist on the morning show at Europe 1
- 2012-2014: Guest on special "Grand forums" segments on Europe 1
- 2013-2014: Columnist on the show Les Pieds dans le plat on Europe 1
- 2014-2017: Director of France Info
- 2017-2018: Deputy Director for Broadcast and Content at Radio France
- 2018-2019: Vice President of Europe 1, RFM, and Virgin Radio
- June 2020-September 2020: Director of franceinfo TV station
- September 2020-September 2022: News Director of France Télévisions
- Since March 2023: Director of CMA CGM Médias

== Works ==
- Laurent Guimier; Nicolas Charbonneau (2004). Docteur Jack et Mister Lang. Le Cherche midi éditeur.
- Laurent Guimier; Nicolas Charbonneau (2005). Génération 69 - Les trentenaires ne vous disent pas merci. éditions Michalon.
- Laurent Guimier; Nicolas Charbonneau (2006). Le Roi est mort ? Vive le Roi. éditions Michalon.
- Laurent Guimier; Nicolas Charbonneau (2008). La V^{e} République pour les nuls. First éditions.
- Laurent Guimier; Nicolas Charbonneau (2010). Le roman des Maisons Closes. éditions du Rocher.
- Laurent Guimier (2012). Archives photographiques de la V^{e} République. éditions Gründ. p. 239. ISBN 978-2-3240-0230-4.
  - The archives of Gamma-Rapho hold true treasures. They visually document the history of the 20th century.
- Laurent Guimier (2019). Jacques Chirac, une vie pour la France. éditions Gründ. p. 216. ISBN 978-2-3240-0919-8.
