= Stéphane Trano =

French journalist (born 1969)

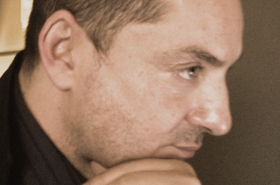
Trano in 2012

Stéphane Trano (born February 1, 1969, in France) is a French journalist and author based in New York City, United States. He graduated in history from Columbia University, New York. His collaborations include L'Express, Le Point and Marianne.

== Biographer ==
Trano has authored three biographical essays:

- In 2000, on François Mitterrand, Mitterrand, Les Amis D’abord Trano explored the former French president's personal networks in-depth. The French historian Jean Lacouture prefaced the book: "François Mitterrand, whose public life is arranged traditionally around three or four parties, including one he roughly forged, confided in me that "in politics, everything is a matter of banding together," which could also have been said, of religion, by a general of the Jesuits in their heyday. And when he defined a friend as he in whom nothing, neither Bousquet, nor failure, nor insult, could alter public or private loyalty, he seemed to speak less as a politician or secular moralist than as an adherent of a religious order. Stephan Trano suggests, line by line, that the reason for the State has reasons other than the reason of the heart. And that loyalty, noble virtue that it is, can be, in the public order, incompatible with the general interest." Trano's biography included the first authorized conversation with Mitterrand's daughter Mazarine Pingeot (since then known as Mazarine Pingeot-Mitterrand), where she confesses about her relationship with her father.

- In 2006, with Une Affaire d’Amitie, Trano extended its work to Mitterrand's families. Mazarine Pingeot wrote the preface, and the former French Minister of Culture from 1981 to 1997 under Mitterrand, Jack Lang, signed the postface.
- An essay about John Fitzgerald Kennedy (November 2013, L'Archipel), "a character built by his entourage (...) Appointed by his father to fulfill his own presidential destiny (...), the first politician invented by the new dominant post-war mass media and shaped by marketing." According to the author, the legend of Kennedy was "carefully maintained by censorship and powerfully organized by his family, and then conveyed by historians. However, his diseases (...), his obsession with women, his dangerous relationships, the wandering of his political thought... (...) represent everything America usually hates: concealment, perjury, betrayal, corruption. Fifty years after his death, the best-hidden mystery of the icon of American lies not in his murder, but in a life totally concealed by myth."

== Journalist ==
At age 18, Trano's first news articles appeared in the weekly magazine Le Nouvel Observateur (The New Observer), founded in 1950 by philosopher Jean-Paul Sartre in conjunction with former members of the French Resistance. He first began as a celebrity lifestyle reporter but soon became a political journalist.

From 1991 to 1996, Trano served as Chief Political Editor of the weekly Tribune Juive (Jewish Tribune). Recognized by the French intellectual community, he reported on controversial issues of public interest for several major publications.

Trano with the Dalai-Lama, 1994

In 1996, Trano became the first Jewish journalist to work under dual Middle East leadership—Palestinian National Authority and Israeli supervision—after being appointed as Co-Chief Editor of the short-lived Palestinian Economic Newsletter, a monthly publication to promote economic development in the Gaza Strip and West Bank under the Oslo Accords of 1993. With a circulation of 15,000, it was published in English, French and Arabic. Yasser Arafat wrote its first editorial when it was published in June 1996. It was published for seven months.

== Political advisory ==
Trano has served in prominent political advisory roles, including:

- Special Advisor to Patrick Gaubert, then Head of the French governmental mission against racism and anti-Semitism (1991–1995)
- Special Advisor to the President of the NATO-affiliated organization International League against Racism and Anti-Semitism (1993)
- Special Advisor to Jean Kahn, President of the Conseil Representatif des Institutions juives de France (Council of French Jewish Institutions), (1993–1996), and President of the European Jewish Congress (1993 to 1995)

In 2005 and 2006, Trano was Director of Online Communications and the author for Jack Lang, President of the Arab World Institute, former NATO-based French anti-piracy expert, and French Minister of Culture and Communications from 1981 to 1995.

Trano has received attention for his contributions to public debate by questioning, in many articles:

- The future of the remembrance of the Shoah
- The issue of ethnocentrism
- The morality of the partners of the peace process in the Middle East
- Discrimination against minorities in Europe
- Anti-Americanism in France
- Endangered populations

In 1996, Trano was one of the 234 public figures who signed a petition for the legal recognition of same-sex couples.

== Other contributions with excerpts from columns ==
- In Libération:

Culture de la Mémoire, Culture du Malheur, (Culture of Memory, Culture of Woe), Tribune, April 29, 1995

Le Bon Juif Selon Le Pen, (The Good Jew According to Le Pen) - Tribune, June 16, 1995

Commémorer d'autres Génocides, (Commemorating Other Genocides), Tribune, January 26, 1995.

En finir avec la Paix des dupes, (Ending the Peace Dupes), Tribune, October 1, 1997.

Israël doit trouver les mots (Israel Must Find the Words), Tribune, November 4, 2000

- In Le Monde:

Le trouble des Juifs de France, de Jean-Michel Dumay, (The Turmoil of the Jews of France, by Jean-Michel Dumay), September 24, 1993

== Bibliography ==
- La Terre malade des Hommes, Paris, Avec Philippe Desbrosses, Editions du Rocher, Paris, 1992. An essay about global warming, global pollution, and alternatives to the massive exploitation of seas and lands for food purposes.ISBN 2-268-01033-3
- L'Intelligence verte, Paris, avec Philippe Desbrosses, Editions du Rocher, Paris, 1997.Second Edition.ISBN 2268023869
- Un rabbin dans la Cite, avec Gilles Bernheim, Editions Calmann-Lévy, 1997. An essay about the story of Gilles Bernheim, French philosopher and rabbi, and currently Chief Rabbi of France, elected on June 22, 2008, who was appointed a Knight [Chevalier] in the Légion d'honneur on April 10, 2009, by the French Government. ISBN 2-7021-2674-X
- Mitterrand, Les Amis d'abord , Paris, Editions L'Archipel, 2000. Preface by Jean Lacouture. Interview with Mazarine Pingeot-Mitterrand. A biography of former French President François Mitterrand (president from 1981 to 1988 and 1988–1995, d. on January 8, 1996), with a preface by the world-renowned French journalist, historian, and biographer, Jean Lacouture (the official biographer of General De Gaulle) and featuring the first exclusive interview with Mitterrand's long-time hidden daughter, Mazarine Pingeot. ISBN 2-7021-3316-9
- Mitterrand, Une Affaire d'Amitie , second edition, Editions L'Archipel, Paris, 2006. Preface by Mazarine Pingeot-Mitterrand, and conclusion by Jack Lang. [1]Second edition of the above with preface by Mazarine Pingeot and an afterword by long-time French Minister of Culture and Communication, Jack Lang. ISBN 2-84187-793-0
- Vive La Terre , collective book, Editions Solar, Paris, 2007, Preface by Nicolas Hulot. A collective work of nonfiction written by and edited under Stephane Trano with contributions from experts on global climate change. ISBN 2-263-04416-7
- Kennedy ou L'Invention du Mensonge
