= Respiratory examination =

Inspection conducted as part of a physical

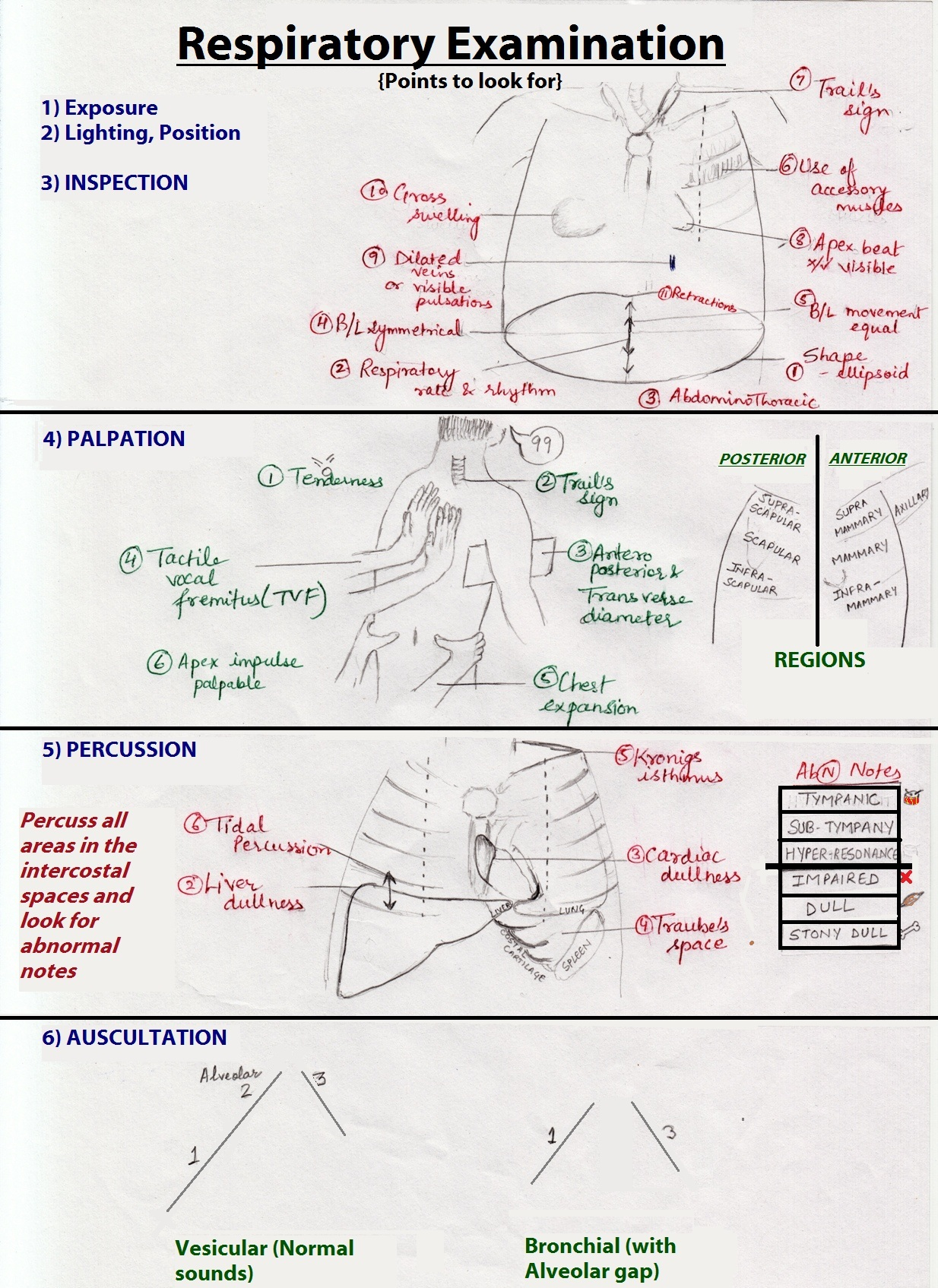
- Respiratory examination
- Purpose: part of physical exam(or when a respiratory problem is present)

A respiratory examination, or lung examination, is performed as part of a physical examination, in response to respiratory symptoms such as shortness of breath, cough, or chest pain, and is often carried out with a cardiac examination.

The four steps of the respiratory exam are inspection, palpation, percussion, and auscultation of respiratory sounds, normally first carried out from the back of the chest.

== Stages ==
After positioning in which the patient sits upright with their arms at the side, with the chest clear of clothing, the four stages of the examination can be carried out. In order to listen to the lungs from the back the patient is asked to move their arms forward to prevent the scapulae (shoulder blades) from obstructing the upper lung fields. These fields are intended to correlate with the lung lobes and are thus tested on the anterior (front) and posterior (back) chest walls.

=== Inspection ===
The examiner then estimates the patient's respiratory rate by observing how many times the patient breathes in and out within the span of one minute. This is typically conducted under the pretext of some other exam, so that the patient does not subconsciously change their baseline respiratory rate, as they might do if they were aware of the examiner observing their breathing. Adults normally breathe about 14 to 20 times per minute, while infants may breathe up to 44 times per minute.

After obtaining the patient's respiratory rate, the examiner looks for any signs of respiratory distress, which may include:

- Cyanosis, a bluish tinge of the extremities (peripheral cyanosis), or of tongue (central cyanosis)
- Pursed-lip breathing
- Accessory muscle use, including the scalene and intercostal muscles
- Diaphragmatic breathing, paradoxical movement of the diaphragm outwards during inspiration
- Intercostal indrawing
- Decreased chest–chest movement on the affected side
- An increased jugular venous pressure, indicating possible right heart failure

The anterior and posterior chest wall are also inspected for any abnormalities, which may include:

- Kyphosis, abnormal anterior-posterior curvature of the spine
- Scoliosis, abnormal lateral curvature of the spine
- Barrel chest, bulging out of the chest wall; normal in children; typical of hyperinflation seen in chronic obstructive pulmonary disease (COPD)
- Pectus excavatum, sternum sunken into the chest
- Pectus carinatum, sternum protruding from the chest

In addition to measuring the patient's respiratory rate, the examiner will observe the patient's breathing pattern:

- A patient with metabolic acidosis will often demonstrate a rapid breathing pattern, known as Kussmaul breathing. Rapid breathing helps the patient compensate for the decrease in blood pH by increasing the amount of exhaled carbon dioxide, which helps prevent further acid accumulation in the blood.
- Cheyne–Stokes respiration is a breathing pattern consisting of alternating periods of rapid and slow breathing, which may result from a brain stem injury. Cheyne-Stokes respiration may be observed in newborn babies, but this is occasionally physiological (normal).
- Chest retractions may be observed in patients with asthma. During a chest retraction, the patient's skin appears to sink into the chest. During supra-sternal retractions, the skin of the neck appears to sink in as the accessory breathing muscles of the neck contract to aid with inspiration. During intercostal retractions, the skin between the ribs appears to sink in as the intercostal muscles (the muscles between the ribs) aid in respiration. These are signs of respiratory distress.

The physician then typically inspects the fingers for cyanosis and clubbing.

Tracheal deviation is also examined.

=== Palpation ===
Palpation is the use of physical touch during examination. During palpation, the physician checks for areas of tenderness, abnormalities of the skin, respiratory expansion and fremitus.

- To assess areas of tenderness, palpate areas of pain, bruises, or lesions on the front and back of the chest. Bruises may indicate a fractured rib, and tenderness between the ribs may indicate inflamed pleura.
- Palpate any abnormal masses or structures on the front and back of the chest. Abnormal masses or sinus tracts may point to infections.
- To observe chest wall expansion on the back of the chest, place palms on the patient's back with fingers parallel to the ribs and thumbs at the 10th ribs. Move hands towards each other to raise some skin on either side of the spine. Instruct the patient to inhale and observe the movement of the thumbs on the patient's back. Repeat the process with each hand on the lower margin of the ribcage at the front of the chest to further observe chest expansion. Asymmetry in chest expansion may be due to disease of lung or pleura.
- Place the bony parts of the palm around the borders of the patient's scapulae while he or she says "ninety-nine" or "one one one" to test for fremitus. Repeat the sequence on the front of the chest. A decrease in fremitus may be observed if the patient has a soft voice, obstructed bronchus, COPD, pneumothorax, or other disease or injuries that may obstruct the vibrations of the larynx.

=== Chest percussion ===
Percussion is the act of tapping on the surface of the body in order to assess the structures that lie beneath the skin.

Percussion and resonance (the quality and feeling of sound) are used to examine lung movement and possible lung conditions.

Specifically, percussion is performed by first placing the middle finger of one hand over the area of interest. The middle finger of the other hand is used to strike the last joint of the placed finger. Percussion is performed in a systematic matter, from the upper chest to the lower ribs, and resonance is compared between the left and right sides of the chest. This is done from the front and back of the thorax.

Percussion over different body tissues results in five common "notes".

1. Resonance: Loud and low pitched. Normal lung sound.
2. Dullness: Medium intensity and pitch. Experienced with fluid.
  - A dull, muffled sound may replace resonance in conditions like pneumonia or hemothorax.
3. Hyper-resonance: Very loud, very low pitch, and longer in duration. Abnormal.
  - Hyper-resonance can result from asthma or emphysema
4. Tympany: Loud and high pitched. Common for percussion over gas-filled spaces.
  - Tympany may result in pneumothorax.
5. Flatness: Soft and high pitched.

=== Auscultation ===
Proper positioning of patient for adequate lung sounds from the back

The areas of the lungs that can be listened to using a stethoscope are called the lung fields, and these are the posterior, lateral, and anterior lung fields. The posterior fields can be listened to from the back and include: the lower lobes (taking up three quarters of the posterior fields); the anterior fields taking up the other quarter; and the lateral fields under the axillae, the left axilla for the lingual, the right axilla for the middle right lobe. The anterior fields can also be auscultated from the front. An area of thinner musculature on the back where sounds may be more audible is called the triangle of auscultation.

During auscultation, deep breaths are taken through the mouth and abnormal sounds listened for. Abnormal sounds include:

- Wheezes, describing a continuous musical sound on expiration or inspiration. A wheeze is the result of narrowed airways. Common causes include asthma and emphysema.
- Rhonchi (an increasingly obsolete term) characterised by low pitched, musical bubbly sounds heard on inspiration and expiration. Rhonchi are the result of viscous fluid in the airways.
- Crackles or rales. Intermittent, non-musical and brief sounds heard during inspiration only. They may be described as fine (soft, high-pitched) or coarse (louder, low-pitched). These are the result of alveoli opening due to increased air pressure during inspiration. Common causes include congestive heart failure.
- Stridor a high-pitched musical breath sound resulting from turbulent air flow in the larynx or lower in the bronchial tree. It is not to be confused with stertor. Causes are typically obstructive, including foreign bodies, croup, epiglottitis, tumours, infection and anaphylaxis.
- Appropriate ratio of inspiration to expiration time (expiration time increased in COPD)
- Bronchial or vesicular breath sounds.

Lastly an assessment of transmitted voice sounds is performed.

- Egophony
- Bronchophony
- Whispered pectoriloquy
