= Acute bronchitis =

- Other names: Chest cold
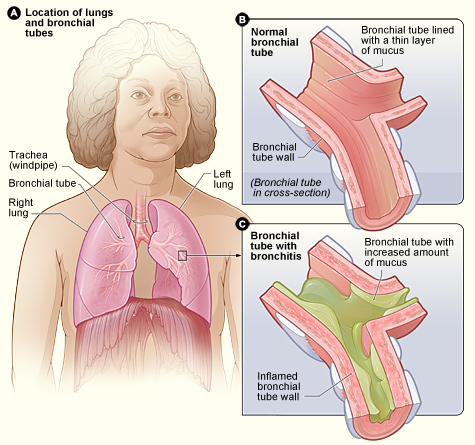
- Figure A shows the location of the lungs and bronchial tubes. Figure B is an enlarged view of a normal bronchial tube. Figure C is an enlarged view of a bronchial tube with bronchitis.
- Specialty: Pulmonology
- Symptoms: Cough with sputum, wheezing, shortness of breath, fever, chest discomfort
- Duration: Up to 6 weeks
- Causes: Typically viral infection
- Risk factors: Tobacco smoke, dust, air pollution
- Diagnostic method: Based on symptoms
- Differential diagnosis: Asthma, pneumonia, bronchiolitis, bronchiectasis, COPD
- Prevention: Avoiding air pollution, handwashing
- Treatment: Rest, paracetamol (acetaminophen), NSAIDs
- Frequency: ~5% one or more episodes a year

Acute bronchitis, also known as a chest cold, is short-term bronchitis – inflammation of the bronchi (large and medium-sized airways) of the lungs. The most common symptom is a cough. Other symptoms include coughing up mucus, wheezing, shortness of breath, fever, and chest discomfort. The infection may last from a few to ten days. The cough may persist for several weeks afterward with the total duration of symptoms usually around three weeks. Some have symptoms for up to six weeks.

In more than 90% of cases, the cause is a viral infection. These viruses may be spread through the air when people cough or by direct contact. Risk factors include exposure to tobacco smoke, dust, and other air pollution. A small number of cases are due to high levels of air pollution or bacteria such as Mycoplasma pneumoniae or Bordetella pertussis. Diagnosis is typically based on a person's signs and symptom. The color of the sputum does not indicate if the infection is viral or bacterial. Determining the underlying organism is typically not needed. Other causes of similar symptoms include asthma, pneumonia, bronchiolitis, bronchiectasis, and COPD. A chest X-ray may be useful to detect pneumonia.

Prevention is by not smoking and avoiding other lung irritants. Frequent hand washing and flu vaccination may also be protective. Treatment of acute bronchitis typically involves rest, paracetamol (acetaminophen), and NSAIDs to help with the fever. Cough medicine has little support for its use and is not recommended in children less than six years of age. Antibiotics should generally not be used. An exception is when acute bronchitis is due to pertussis. Tentative evidence supports honey and pelargonium to help with symptoms.

Acute bronchitis is one of the most common diseases. About 5% of adults are affected and about 6% of children have at least one episode a year. It occurs more often in the winter. More than 10 million people in the United States visit a doctor each year for this condition with approximately 70% receiving antibiotics, most of which are not needed. There are efforts to decrease the use of antibiotics in acute bronchitis.

== Signs and symptoms ==
The primary symptom is a cough with sputum that may be purulent. The illness may also cause shortness of breath or wheezing. Upper respiratory tract infections (URTIs) often precede acute bronchitis, with overlapping symptoms including headache, nasal congestion, and sore throat. About a third of patients will experience a fever, but fevers due to acute bronchitis rarely rise above 100 °F (37.8 °C) or last longer than a few days. As fever and other systemic symptoms are less common in acute bronchitis than in pneumonia, their presence raises suspicion for the latter, especially high or persistent fevers.

== Cause ==
Acute bronchitis can be caused by contagious pathogens, most commonly viruses. Typical viruses include respiratory syncytial virus, rhinovirus, influenza, and others. Bacteria are uncommon pathogens but may include Mycoplasma pneumoniae, Chlamydophila pneumoniae, Bordetella pertussis, Streptococcus pneumoniae, and Haemophilus influenzae.

- Damage caused by irritation of the airways leads to inflammation and leads to neutrophils infiltrating the lung tissue.
- Mucosal hypersecretion is promoted by a substance released by neutrophils.
- Further obstruction to the airways is caused by more goblet cells in the small airways. This is typical of chronic bronchitis.
- Although infection is not the reason or cause of chronic bronchitis, it is seen to aid in sustaining the bronchitis.

== Diagnosis ==
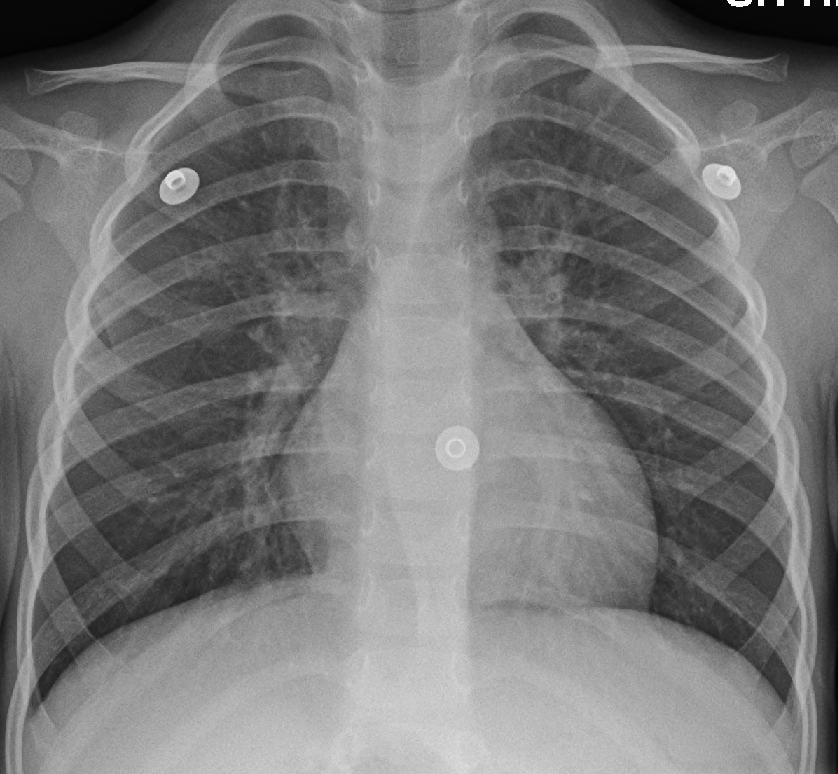
Mild peribronchial cuffing as seen in viral bronchitis

A physical examination will often reveal decreased intensity of breath sounds, wheezing, rhonchi, and prolonged expiration. During examination, physicians rely on history and the presence of persistent or acute onset of cough, followed by a URTI with no traces of pneumonia. Acute bronchitis is typically a clinical diagnosis that relies on patients history and exam, and should be suspected in patients with an acute onset of cough, which often follows a URTI without traces of pneumonia.

Although there is no universally-accepted clinical definition for acute bronchitis, there is a proposed set of practical criteria (Macfarlane, 2001) that include:

- An acute illness of less than three weeks.
- Cough as the predominant symptom.
- At least one other lower respiratory tract symptom, such as sputum production, wheezing, chest pain.
- No alternative explanation for the symptoms.

A variety of tests may be performed in people presenting with cough and shortness of breath:

- A chest X-ray is useful to exclude pneumonia which is more common in those with a fever, fast heart rate, fast respiratory rate, or who are old.
- A sputum sample showing neutrophil granulocytes (inflammatory white blood cells) and culture showing that has pathogenic microorganisms such as Streptococcus species.
- A blood test would indicate inflammation (as indicated by a raised white blood cell count and elevated C-reactive protein).

Decreased breath sounds, crackles, wheezing, and rhonchi that clears with coughs may be heard in the chest. Dullness to percussion and pleural rub suggest disease extension beyond the bronchi such as seen with pneumonia. Paroxysms of cough followed by inspiratory whoop and vomiting suggests pertussis.

== Prevention ==
Approaches to prevent acute bronchitis include smoking cessation and avoiding lung irritants. Frequent hand washing may also be protective. An oral whole cell nontypeable Haemophilus influenzae vaccine given in the fall has demonstrated short term effectiveness in reducing the frequency and severity of the disease during the winter.

== Treatment ==
Most cases are self-limited and resolve themselves in a few weeks. Pain medications may help with symptoms. Other recommendations may include rest and keeping well hydrated.

=== Antibiotics ===
Evidence does not support the general use of antibiotics in acute bronchitis. A systematic review found antibiotics reduced cough by an average of 12 hours (out of a total average of about 14–28 days). Antibiotics caused more side effects such as nausea and diarrhoea, and also may promote antibiotic-resistant bacteria. It is possible they are useful in susceptible groups such as the frail and elderly but there was not enough research information to determine this.

Referring to acute bronchitis by benign-sounding terms such as "chest cold" or "viral infection" may reduce antibiotic usage by improving patient satisfaction when antibiotics are not prescribed.

=== Smoking cessation ===
To help the bronchial tree heal faster and not make bronchitis worse, smokers should quit smoking completely.

=== Alternative therapeutic approaches ===
Salbutamol is not effective in children with an acute cough who do not have restricted airways. There is weak evidence that salbutamol may be useful in adults with wheezing due to a restricted airway; however, it may result in nervousness, shakiness or a tremor.

== Prognosis ==
Acute bronchitis usually lasts a few days or weeks. It may accompany or closely follow a cold or the flu, or may occur on its own. Bronchitis usually begins with a dry cough, including waking the patient at night. After a few days, it progresses to a wetter or productive cough, which may be accompanied by fever, fatigue, and headache. The fever, fatigue, and malaise may last only a few days, but the wet cough may last up to several weeks. A persistent fever greater than 100°F (37.8°C) should suggest consideration of influenza or pneumonia.

== Epidemiology ==
Acute bronchitis is one of the most common diseases. About 5% of adults are affected and about 6% of children have at least one episode a year. It occurs more often in the winter.

In infants under one year of age, acute bronchitis was the most common reason for admission to the hospital after an emergency department visit in the US in 2011.
