= Vibration response imaging =

Lung imaging technology

Imaging Lung Sound Behavior with Vibration Response Imaging
- Purpose: physiologic vibration generated during the breathing process

In medicine, vibration response imaging (VRI) is a novel computer-based technology that takes the concept of the stethoscope to a more progressive level. Since the invention of the stethoscope by René-Théophile-Hyacinthe Laennec France in 1816, physicians have been utilizing lung sounds to diagnose various chest conditions. Today auscultation provides physicians with extensive information on the examination of the patient. The skills of the examiner however, vary, as seen in a clinical study that was conducted on the diagnosis of pneumonia in 2004.

The technology is based on the physiologic vibration generated during the breathing process when flow of air distributing through the bronchial tree creates vibration of the bronchial tree walls and the lung parenchyma itself. Emitted vibration energy propagating through the lung parenchyma and the chest wall reaches the body surface where is captured and recorded by a set of acoustic sensors. The sensors are positioned over the lung areas on the back that allows for the simultaneous reception of these signals from both lungs. These signals are then transformed by a complex algorithm to display the spatial changes in energy intensity during the breathing cycle. The intensity changes follow changes of airflow through the breathing cycle - i.e.: flow increases and decreases during inspiration and expiration. The VRI technology represents these changes as a grey scale-based dynamic image. The darker the higher the vibration intensity and the lighter the lower the vibration intensity is.

== VRI and Lung Sound Behavior ==
The foremost information that the VRI provides on vibration energy, is how lung sounds behave and function during inspiration and expiration, which also includes individual breathing intensity (or vibration energy) graphs for each lung along the time period of 12 seconds. The distribution pattern of normal lung vibration energy for healthy individuals evolves centrally (presumably reflecting early airflow distribution in central large airways) and develops centrifugally in a simultaneous fashion for left and right lungs. Following peak inspiration, there is centripetal regression of vibration energy toward the end of inspiration. The same pattern is repeated during expiration phase accordingly. The peak of inspiratory vibration energy is higher than expiratory energy peak due to inspiration being more active process compared to expiration. At the Maximum Energy Frame (MEF) (a frame on the dynamic image representing the maximum distribution of vibration energy at the peak of inspiration), the right and left zones has a similar shape, area and image intensity, with a tendency, however, to greater intensity on the left. The vibration energy graph is a graphical representation of the behavioral pattern for both lungs and each lung individually. For a healthy individual with normal lungs, the graph has a consistent pattern that is repeated throughout the 12 second breathing period. The graph increases to the peak at the MEF frame on inspiration, and then decreasing to expiration. During expiration the graph pattern looks similar to that of inspiration, however at a lower intensity. When comparing right to left intensity graphs, the graphs are synchronized and peak at the same time and are almost at the same intensity level.

Lung ailments such as Chronic Obstructive Pulmonary Disease (COPD) cause the narrowing of airways in the lungs, limiting airflow and causing shortness of breath. Due to the limitation of airflow the VRI breathing pattern differs from that of a healthy individual. The patterns show asynchrony between lungs; with peaks in vibration energy difference. Because of this asynchrony, the contours of the lung periphery are not smooth, but have a "bumpy-lumpy" or "disco" appearance. The vibration energy graph displays an inconsistent pattern and it is difficult to delineate inspiration from expiration. When comparing the right to the left lung the energy graphs peak at different times, and differs at the intensity level.

== Conclusion ==
Studies have shown that normal lung sounds have distinctive characteristics that can be differentiated from abnormal lung sounds, thus supporting the potential clinical value of acoustic lung imaging. By using the VRI that simultaneously records the vibration energy from 40 points over 12 seconds and presents all of the derived information in a single image the physician can be less dependent on memory. Another advantage of using this method is the ability to store and later compare the data to subsequent recordings. Finally, the VRI examination is harmless, doesn't emit any energy, and is non-invasive and radiation-free, unlike potentially harmful radiologic studies. Even though a lot of literature has been published on the VRI method, it is still fairly new and as such has its limitations. Clinical value is limited to afore mentioned studies, and crucial elements such a complete patient work-up, that includes extensive patient history, medication and present presentation of symptoms are invaluable to the decision making process as to how any physician will proceed with the patients' treatment.

== See also ==
- Imaging instruments
- Medical imaging
