= René Laennec =

French physician (1781–1826)

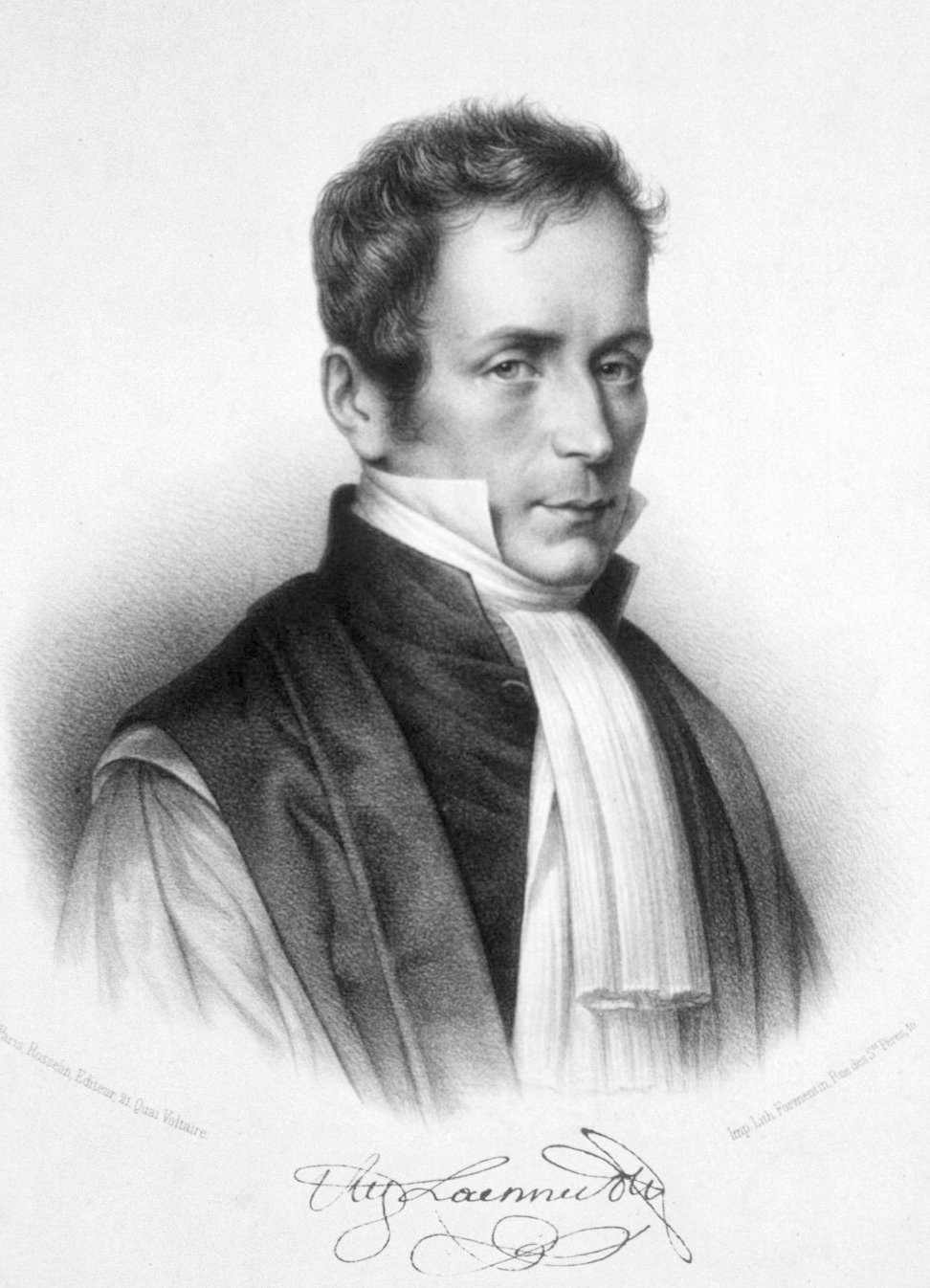
- Born: René-Théophile-Hyacinthe Laennec; 17 February 1781; Quimper, France
- Died: 13 August 1826 (aged 45); Ploaré, France
- Citizenship: France
- Education: University of Paris
- Known for: Inventing the stethoscope
- Spouse: Jacquette Guichard (m. 1824)
- Scientific career
- Fields: medicine

René-Théophile-Hyacinthe Laennec (Note: While some sources use the alternative spelling Laënnec, the correct form is Laennec, without the diaeresis. Although his name is indeed pronounced "la-Ennec", a diaeresis is used for marking pronounced vowels in English words. It is not used in Breton names, and Laennec himself did not use the diaeresis in his signature.) (French: [laɛnɛk]; 17 February 1781 – 13 August 1826) was a French medical doctor and musician. His skill at carving his own wooden flutes led him to invent the stethoscope in 1816, while working at the Hôpital Necker. He pioneered its use in diagnosing various chest conditions. He became a lecturer at the Collège de France in 1822 and professor of medicine in 1823. His final appointments were that of head of the medical clinic at the Hôpital de la Charité and professor at the Collège de France. He went into a coma and subsequently died of tuberculosis on 13 August 1826, at age 45.

== Early life ==
Laennec was born in Quimper (Brittany). His mother died of tuberculosis when he was five years old, and he went to live with his great-uncle the Abbé Laennec (a priest). As a child, Laennec became ill with fatigue and repeated instances of fever. Laennec was also thought to have asthma. At the age of twelve, he proceeded to Nantes, where his uncle, Guillaime-François Laennec, worked in the faculty of medicine at the university. Laennec was a gifted student.

His father, a lawyer, discouraged him from continuing as a doctor. For a time, he took long walks in the country, danced, studied Greek, and wrote poetry. In 1799, he returned to study medicine at the University of Paris under Dupuytren and Jean-Nicolas Corvisart-Desmarets. There he was trained to use sound as a diagnostic aid. Corvisart advocated the re-introduction of percussion during the French Revolution.

== Invention of the stethoscope ==
René Laennec wrote in the classic treatise De l'Auscultation Médiate,

In 1816, [he was] consulted by a young woman laboring under general symptoms of diseased heart, and in whose case percussion and the application of the hand were of little avail on account of the great degree of fatness. The other method just mentioned direct auscultation being rendered inadmissible by the age and sex of the patient, I happened to recollect a simple and well-known fact in acoustics, ... the great distinctness with which we hear the scratch of a pin at one end of a piece of wood on applying our ear to the other. Immediately, on this suggestion, I rolled a quire of paper into a kind of cylinder and applied one end of it to the region of the heart and the other to my ear, and was not a little surprised and pleased to find that I could thereby perceive the action of the heart in a manner much more clear and distinct than I had ever been able to do by the immediate application of my ear.

Laennec had discovered that the new stethoscope was superior to the normally used method of placing the ear over the chest, particularly if the patient was overweight. A stethoscope also avoided the embarrassment of placing the ear against the chest of a woman.

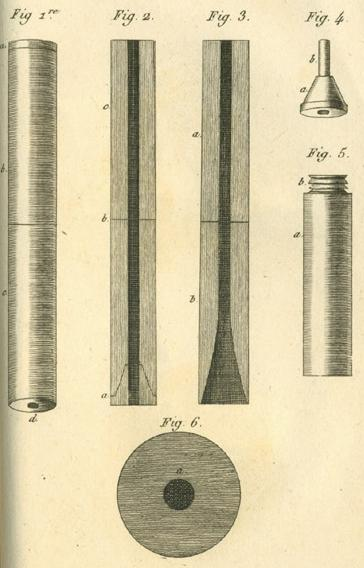
The first drawing of a stethoscope (1819)

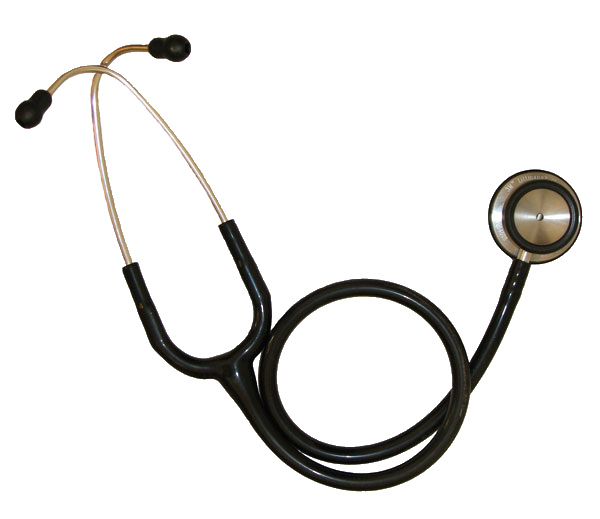
A modern stethoscope

Laennec is said to have seen school children playing with a long piece of solid wood in the days leading up to his innovation. The children held their ear to one end of the stick while the opposite end was scratched with a pin, the stick transmitted and amplified the scratch. His skill as a flautist may also have inspired him. He built his first instrument as a 25 cm by 2.5 cm hollow wooden cylinder, which he later refined into three detachable parts. The refined design featured a funnel-shaped cavity to augment the sound, separable from the body of the stethoscope.

His clinical work allowed him to follow chest patients from bedside to the autopsy table. He was therefore able to correlate sounds captured by his new instruments with specific pathological changes in the chest, in effect pioneering a new non-invasive diagnostic tool. Tuberculosis, for example, was one ailment he could more clearly identify using his knowledge of typical and atypical chest sounds. Laennec was the first to classify and discuss the terms rales, rhonchi, crepitance, and egophony – terms that doctors now use on a daily basis during physical exams and diagnoses. Laënnec presented his findings and research on the stethoscope to the French Academy of Sciences, and in 1819 he published his masterpiece On Mediate Auscultation.

Laennec coined the phrase mediate auscultation (indirect listening), as opposed to the popular practice at the time of directly placing the ear on the chest (immediate auscultation). He named his instrument the stethoscope, from the Greek words στήθος[stethos] (chest), and σκοπός[skopos] (examination).

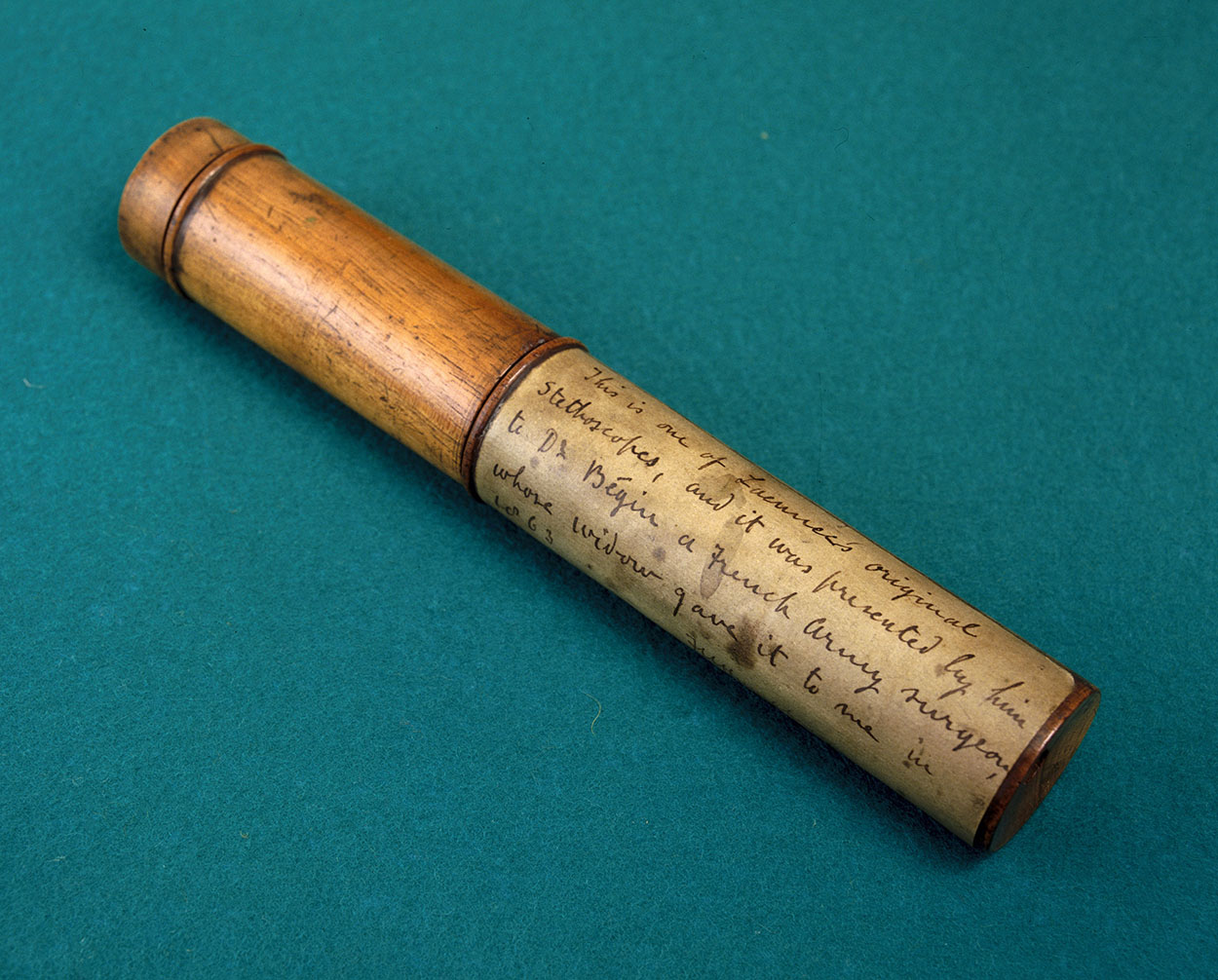
One of the original stethoscopes belonging to Rene Theophile Laennec made of wood and brass

The stethoscope quickly gained popularity as De l'Auscultation Médiate was translated and distributed across France, England, Italy, and Germany in the early 1820s. However, not all doctors readily embraced the new stethoscope. Although the New England Journal of Medicine reported the invention of the stethoscope two years later in 1821, as late as 1885, a professor of medicine stated, "He that hath ears to hear, let him use his ears and not a stethoscope." Even the founder of the American Heart Association, L.A. Connor (1866–1950), carried a silk handkerchief with him to place on the wall of the chest for ear auscultation.

Laennec often referred to the stethoscope as "the cylinder", and as he neared death only a few years later, he bequeathed his own stethoscope to his nephew, referring to it as "the greatest legacy of my life".

The modern type, with two earpieces, was invented in 1851 by A. Leared; in 1852 G.P. Cammann perfected the design of the instrument for commercial production, which has become the current standard form.

== Other medical contributions ==
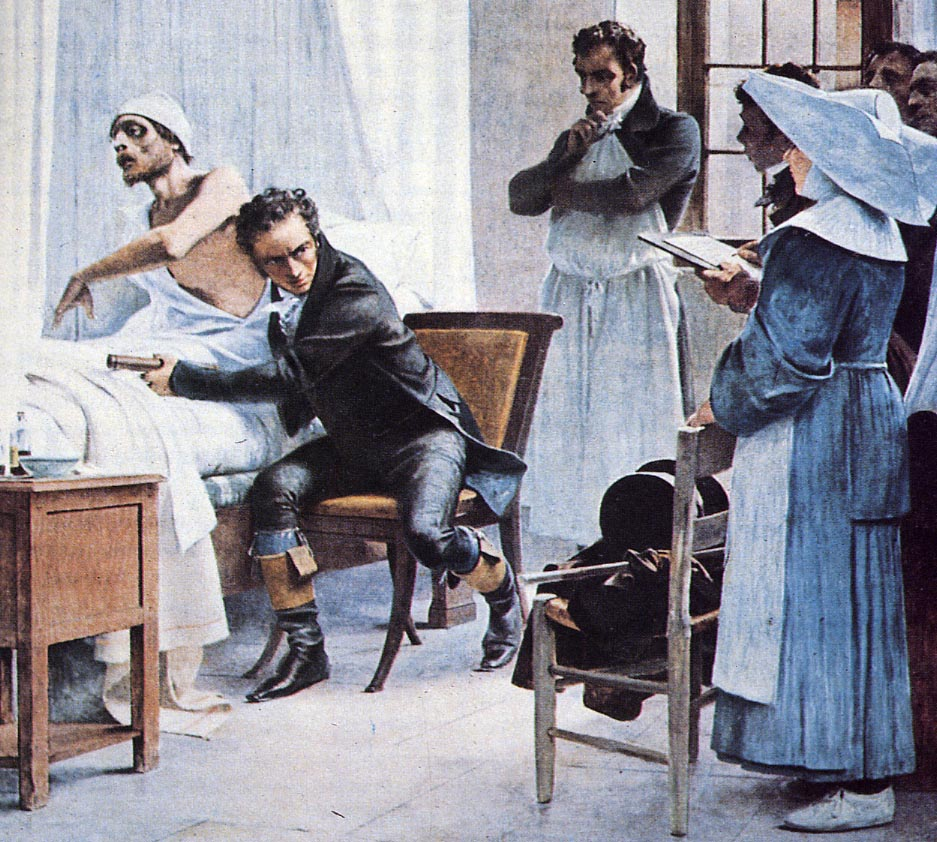
Laennec auscultates a patient before his students

He developed the understanding of peritonitis and cirrhosis. Although the disease of cirrhosis was known, Laennec gave cirrhosis its name, using the Greek word (κιρρός kirrhos, tawny) that referred to the tawny, yellow nodules characteristic of the disease.

He coined the term melanoma and described metastases of melanoma to the lungs. In 1804, while still a medical student, he was the first person to lecture on melanoma. This lecture was subsequently published in 1805. Laennec actually used the term melanose, which he derived from the Greek (μέλας, melas) for "black". Over the years, there were bitter exchanges between Laennec and Dupuytren, the latter objecting that there was no mention of his work in this area and his role in its discovery.

He also studied phthisis pulmonalis (tuberculosis). Coincidentally, his nephew, Mériadec Laennec, is said to have diagnosed tuberculosis in Laennec using Laennec's stethoscope. Laennec wrote A Treatise on the Disease of the Chest, in which he focused on diseases of the chest such as tuberculosis and diagnostics such as pectoriloquy. He discussed the symptoms of Phthisis pulmonalis and what parts of the body it affects. It was written in an academic manner for learning purposes.

Laennec advocated objective scientific observation. Professor Benjamin Ward Richardson stated in Disciples of Aesculapius that "the true student of medicine reads Laennec's treatise on mediate auscultation and the use of the stethoscope once in two years at least as long as he is in practice. It ranks with the original work of Vesalius, Harvey and Hippocrates."

== Religious views ==
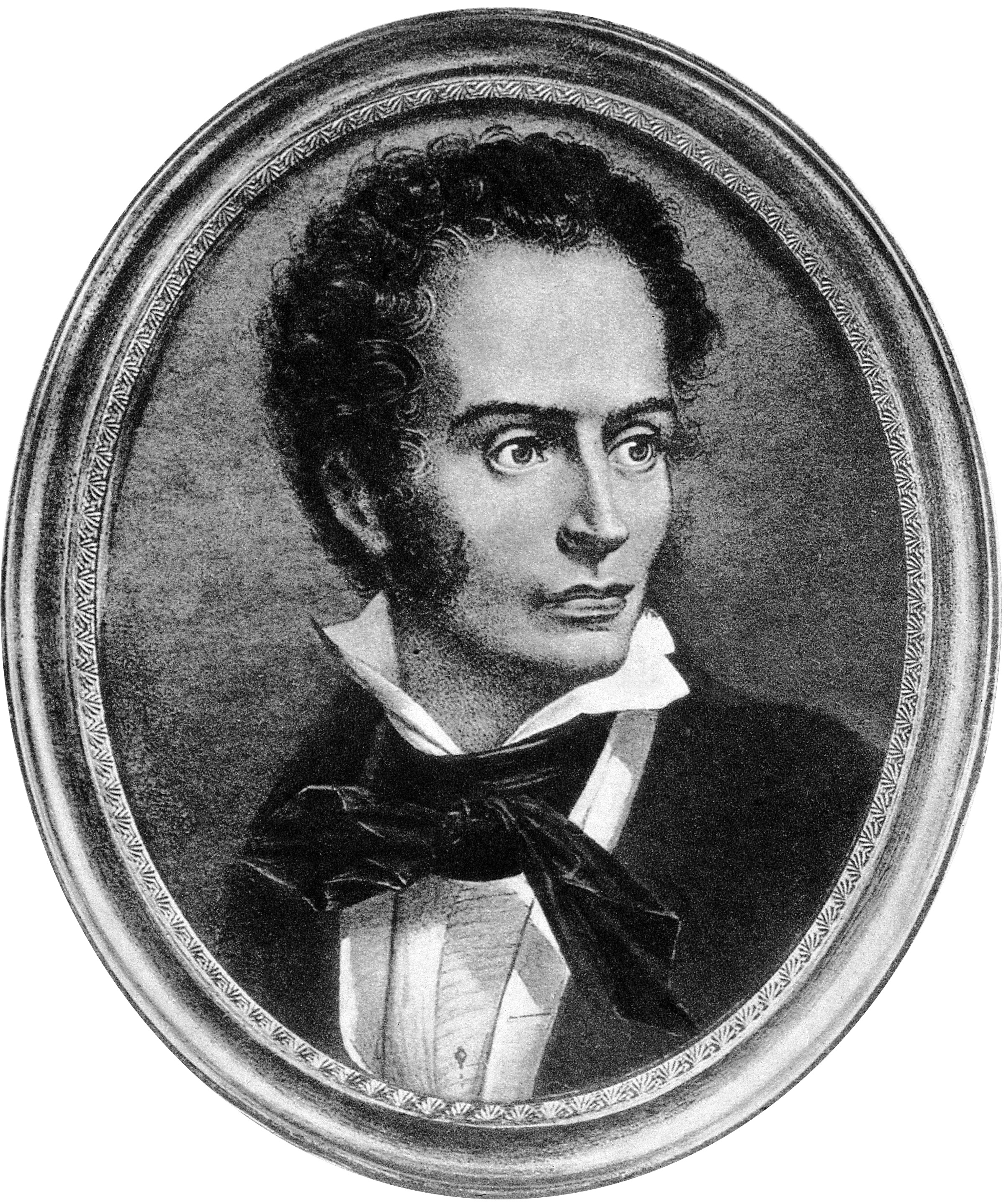
René T.H. Laennec

Laennec "was intensely religious and was a devout Catholic all his life". He was noted as a very kind man and his charity to the poor became proverbial. Austin Flint, the 1884 president of the American Medical Association, said that "Laennec's life affords a striking instance among others disproving the vulgar error that the pursuit of science is unfavourable to religious faith."

In J. Forbes' annotated translation of Laennec's treatise, Forbes reported:

Laennec was a man of the greatest probity, habitually observant of his religious and social duties. He was a sincere Christian, and a good Catholic, adhering to his religion and his church through good report and bad report." His death (says M. Bayle) was that of a Christian. Supported by the hope of a better life, prepared by the constant practice of virtue, he saw his end approach with much composure and resignation. His religious principles, imbibed with his earliest knowledge, were strengthened by the conviction of his maturer reason. He took no pains to conceal them when they were disadvantageous to his worldly interests; and he made no boast of them, when their avowal might have been a title to favour and advancement."

— J. Forbes (1838 [1835])

== Legacy and tribute ==
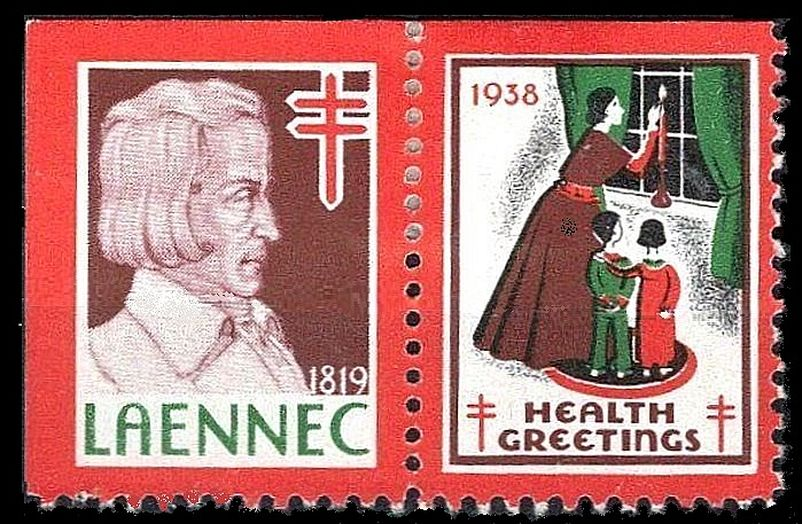
Laennec was celebrated in the United States on a Christmas seal issued in 1938

Honors: Medical terms named after Laennec:

- Laennec's cirrhosis refers to the appearance of regenerated liver, comprising small lobules separated by a fine, fibrous tissue;
- Laennec's thrombus is an antenatal thrombus in the heart;
- Laennec's pearls refer to sputum produced by asthmatics;
- Hamman's murmur, also known as Laënnec–Hamman symptom, Laënnec–Müller–von Bergmann–Hamman symptom, or Hamman's crunch, is a crunching sound due to spontaneous mediastinal emphysema, heard over the precordium.
- At the Université Claude Bernard Lyon 1 one of the four medical schools is named after Laennec.
- On 17 February 2016, Google celebrated his 235th birthday with a Google Doodle.

== Laennec in fiction ==
A Rene Laennec appears in Rudyard Kipling's Rewards and Fairies, the second of two books where two children, Dan and Una, encounter past inhabitants of England. In the short section "Marlake Witches", set during the Napoleonic Wars, Una meets a consumptive young lady who speaks of being treated by a French doctor, a prisoner on parole, one Rene Laennec. This prisoner discusses with a local herbalist the use of 'wooden trumpets' for listening to patients' chests, much to the distrust of the local doctor. Obviously, Kipling was aware of Laennec's work and invented an English connection.

He was the subject of a 1949 French film Doctor Laennec in which he was played by Pierre Blanchar.

== Laennec's landmarks in Paris ==
On the exterior wall of the "Hôpital Necker – Enfants Malades", where Laennec wrote Mediate auscultation, near the entrance of the hospital in 149, Rue de Sèvres, there is a marble memorial tablet with an engraved portrait of Laennec and this inscription: "Dans cet hôpital Laennec découvrit l'auscultation. 1781–1826".

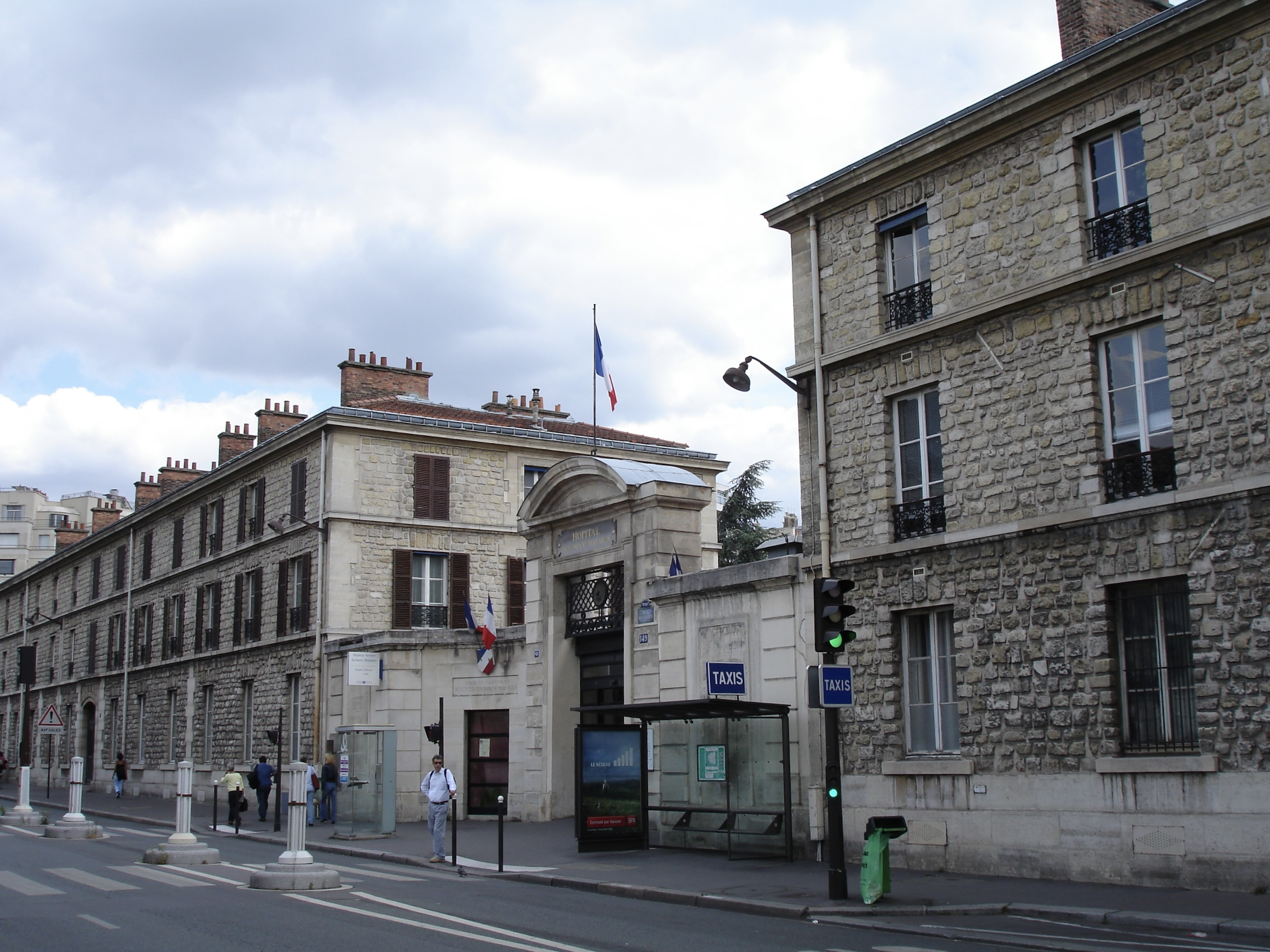
The entrance in Rue de Sèvres

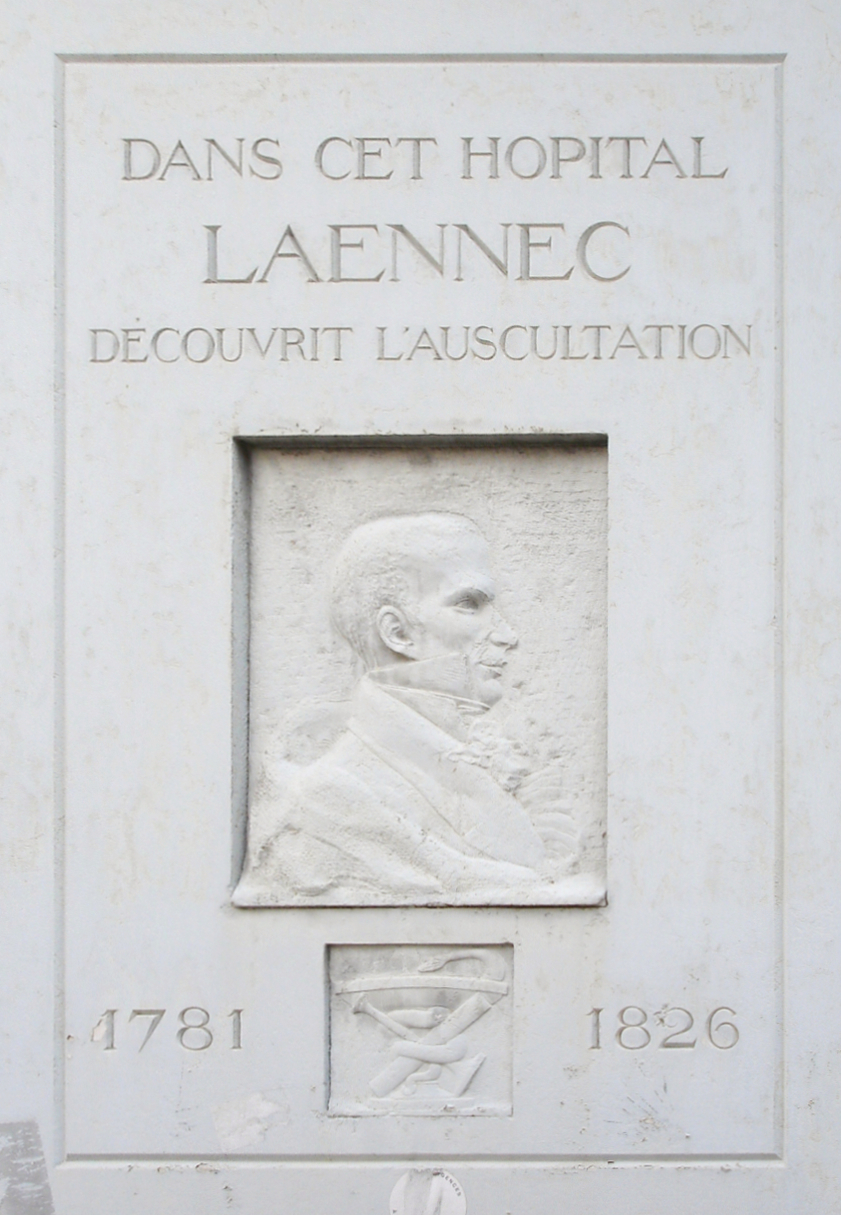
Laennec's memorial tablet

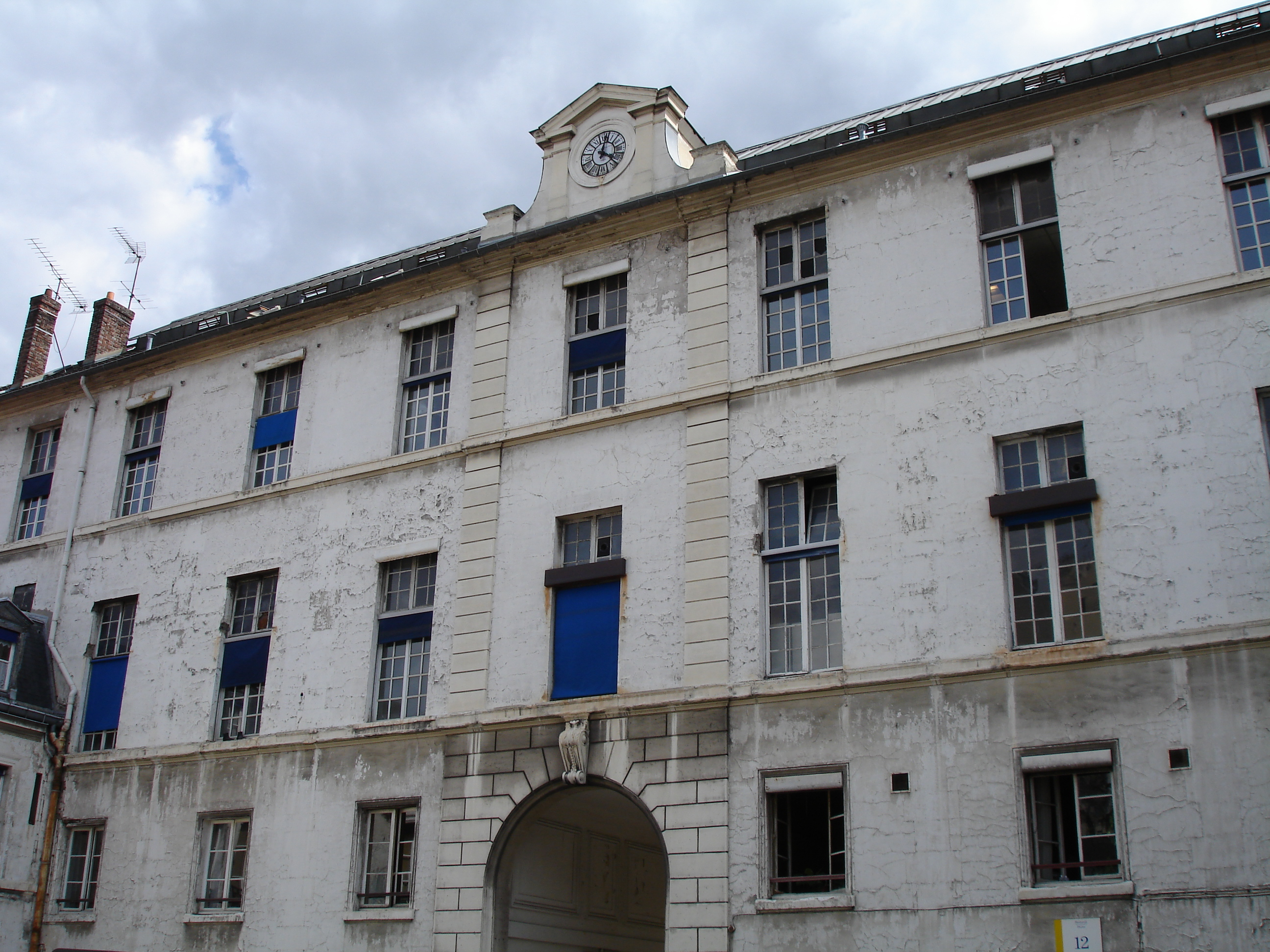
One of the old buildings of the hospital

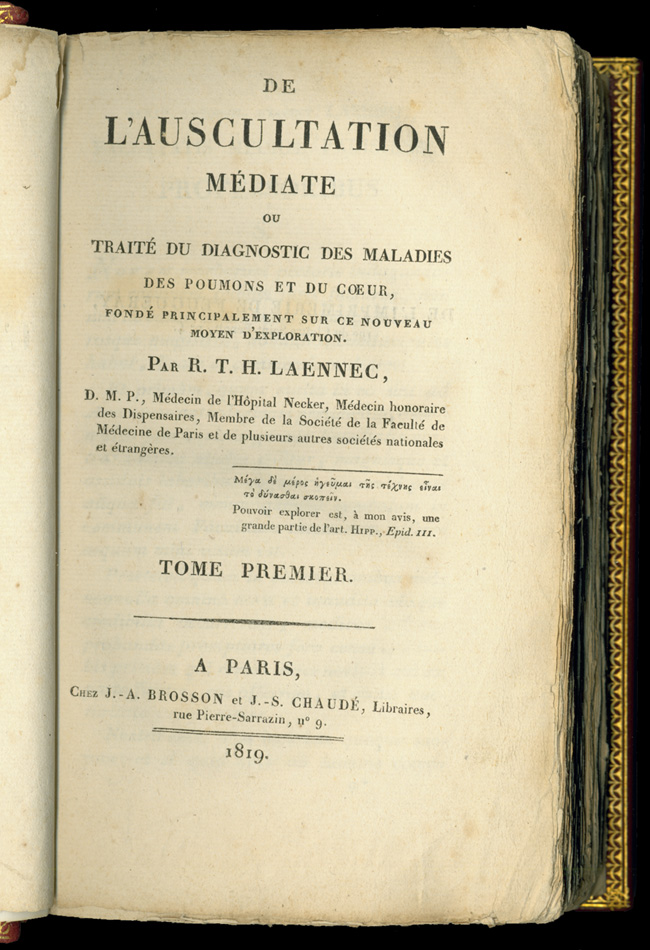
De l'auscultation médiate ... Paris: J.-A. Brosson et J.-S. Chaude, 1819.

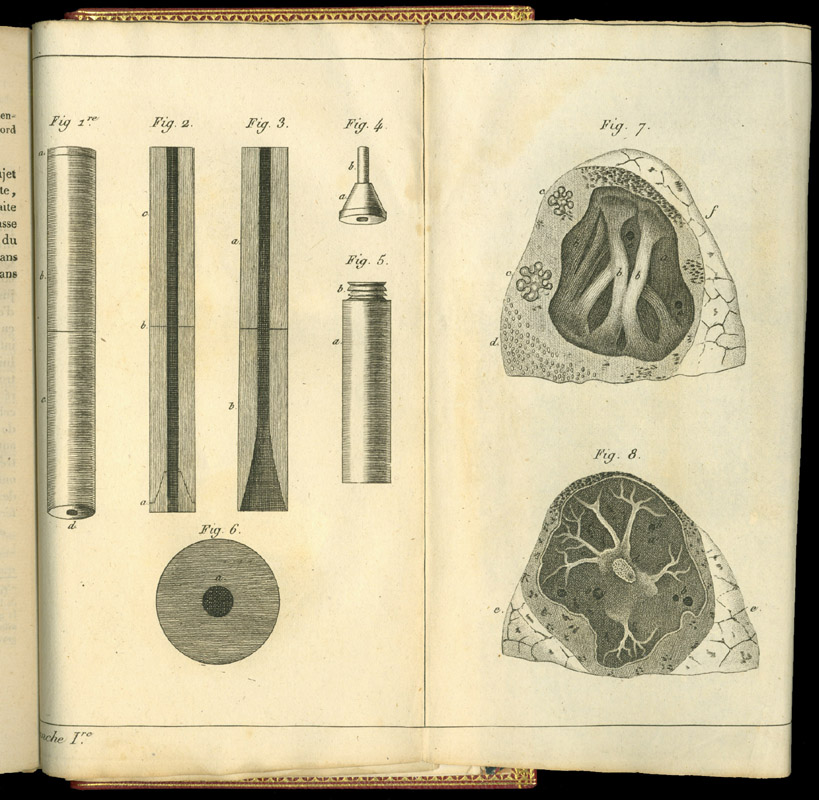
De l'auscultation médiate .... Drawings of the stethoscope and lungs.

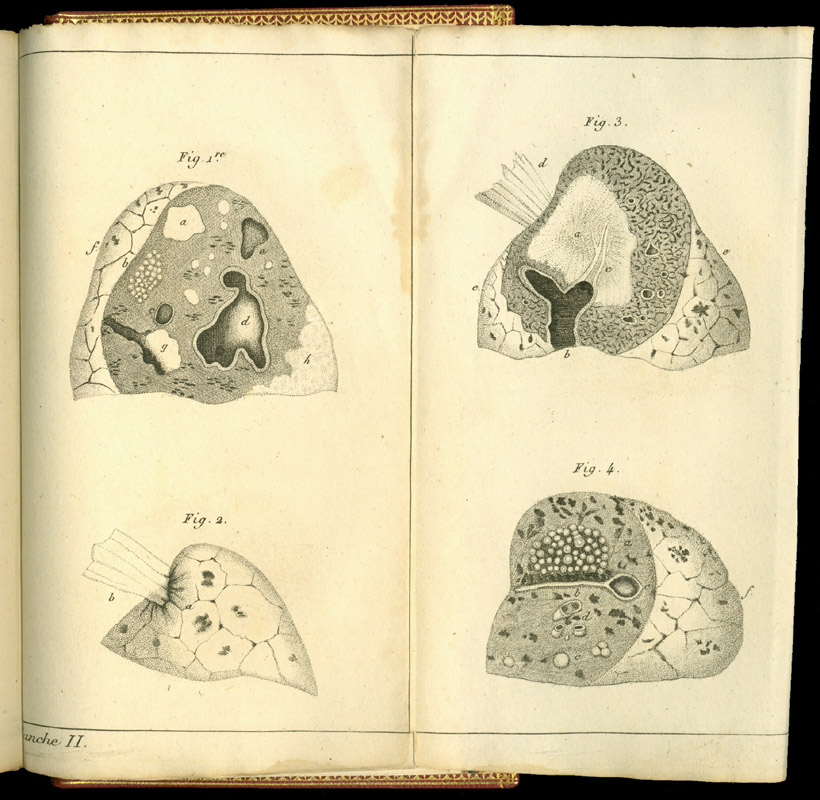
De l'auscultation médiate ... Most of the plates in his book illustrate the diseased lung as do these four images that are consistent with lungs affected by tuberculosis.
