= Bronchophony =

- Other names: Bronchiloquy
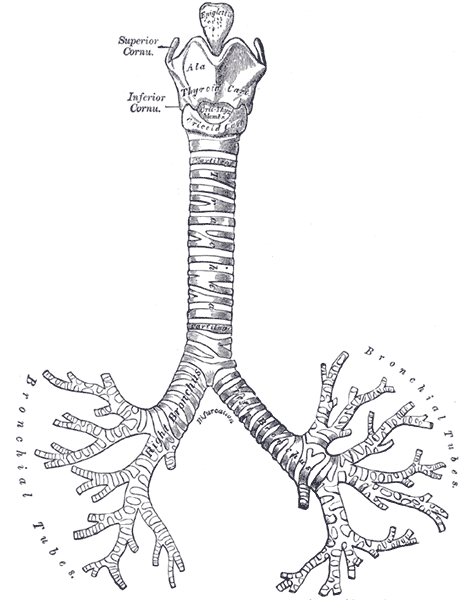
- Front view of cartilages of larynx, trachea, and bronchi.
- Specialty: Respirology

Bronchophony is the abnormal transmission of sounds from the lungs or bronchi. Bronchophony is a type of pectoriloquy.

It is a general medical sign detected by auscultation.

== Technique ==
The patient is requested to repeat a word several times while the provider auscultates symmetrical areas of each lung. The numbers "ninety-nine" or "sixty-six" are traditionally mentioned. The choice of "ninety-nine" is the result of a literal translation. The test was originally described by a German physician who used the phrase "neun und neunzig" (pronounced [ˈnɔʏnʊntˈnɔʏntsɪç]), which he found would cause maximum vibration of the chest. The translation, "ninety-nine", has fewer vowels and is less effective in evoking the phenomenon. Better phrases in English include "toy boat”, "Scooby Doo", and “blue balloons".

== Interpretation ==
Normally, the sound of the patient's voice becomes less distinct as the auscultation moves peripherally; bronchophony is the phenomenon of the patient's voice remaining loud at the periphery of the lungs or sounding louder than usual over a distinct area of consolidation, such as in pneumonia. This is a valuable tool in physical diagnosis used by medical personnel when auscultating the chest.

Often, the patient does not have to speak for the provider to hear signs of bronchophony. Rather, the normal breath sounds are increased in loudness – referred to by doctors as "increased breath sounds" – over the affected area of the lungs is indicative.

== Causes ==
Bronchophony may be caused by a solidification of lung tissue around the bronchi – which may indicate lung cancer – or by fluid in the alveoli, which may indicate pneumonia. However, it may also have benign causes, such as wide bronchi. As such, it is usually an indication for further investigation rather than the main basis of a diagnosis.

== Other observations ==
Other tools used in auscultation include listening for egophony, whispered pectoriloquy, crackles, rhonchi or wheezing. Percussion is also often used to determine diseases of the chest.
