= Squawk =

Squawk may refer to:

- Bird vocalization
- Squawk (sound), a sound produced by patients with various lung disorders
- Squawk (album), hard rock band Budgie's second album, released in 1972
- Squawk code (more formally transponder code), a four-digit number sent out by an aircraft's transponder
- Squawk virtual machine, a Java virtual machine for small devices, written mostly in Java programming language
- Hoot-n-holler (also known as a squawk box system), a type of telecommunications system where there is a permanent open circuit between two or more parties
