= Respiratory sounds =

- Other names: Breath sounds, lung sounds
- Specialty: Respirology

Respiratory sounds, also known as lung sounds or breath sounds, are the specific sounds generated by the movement of air through the respiratory system. These may be easily audible or identified through auscultation of the respiratory system through the lung fields with a stethoscope as well as from the spectral characteristics of lung sounds. These include normal breath sounds and added sounds such as crackles, wheezes, pleural friction rubs, stertor, and stridor.

Description and classification of the sounds usually involve auscultation of the inspiratory and expiratory phases of the breath cycle, noting both the pitch (typically described as low (≤200 Hz), medium or high (≥400 Hz)) and intensity (soft, medium, loud or very loud) of the sounds heard.

== Normal breath sounds ==
Normal breath sounds are classified as vesicular, bronchovesicular, bronchial or tracheal based on the anatomical location of auscultation. Normal breath sounds can also be identified by patterns of sound duration and the quality of the sound as described in the table below:

Name	Location where heard normally	Quality of sound	Sound duration	Example
tracheal	over the trachea	very loud	expiratory sound duration is equivalent to inspiratory sound	
bronchial	over the manubrium	loud, high pitched	expiratory sound duration is longer than inspiratory sound	
bronchovesicular	anteriorly between the 1st and 2nd intercostal space; posteriorly in-between the scapulae	intermediate	expiratory sound duration is about equivalent to inspiratory sound	
vesicular	over most of both lungs	soft, low pitched	expiratory sound duration is shorter than inspiratory sound	

== Abnormal breath sounds ==
Common types of abnormal breath sounds include the following:

Name	Continuous/discontinuous	Frequency/pitch	Inspiratory/expiratory	Quality	Common Causes	Example
Wheeze or rhonchi	continuous	high (wheeze) or lower (rhonchi)	expiratory or inspiratory	whistling/sibilant	Caused by narrowing of airways, such as in asthma, chronic obstructive pulmonary disease, foreign body.	Wheezing The sound of wheezing as heard with a stethoscope.
Stridor	continuous	high	inspiratory, expiratory, or both	whistling/sibilant	epiglottitis, foreign body, laryngeal edema, croup	Stridor Inspiratory and expiratory stridor in a 13-month child with croup.
Inspiratory gasp	continuous	high	inspiratory	whoop	pertussis (whooping cough)	see Merck Manual, Classic Whooping Cough sound file
Crackles (rales)	continuous	high (fine) or low (coarse)	inspiratory	cracking/clicking/rattling	pneumonia, pulmonary edema, tuberculosis, bronchitis, heart failure	Crackles Crackles heard in the lungs of a person with pneumonia using a stethoscope.
Pleural friction rub	discontinuous	low	inspiratory and expiratory	many repeated rhythmic sounds	inflammation of lung linings, lung tumors	not available
Hamman's sign (or Mediastinal crunch)	discontinuous		neither (heartbeat)	crunching, rasping	pneumomediastinum, pneumopericardium	not available
Grunting	Continuous	low	expiratory	snoring	surfactant deficiency, pneumonia, cardiac abnormalities	

=== Continued ===
- Rales: Small clicking, bubbling, or rattling sounds in the lungs. They are heard when a person inhales. They are believed to occur when air opens alveoli. Rales can also be described as moist, dry, fine, and coarse.
- Rhonchi are coarse rattling respiratory sounds, usually caused by secretions in bronchial airways. The sounds resemble snoring. "Rhonchi" is the plural form of the singular word "rhonchus".
- Stridor: Wheeze-like sound heard when a person breathes. Usually it is due to a blockage of airflow in the windpipe (trachea) or in the back of the throat.
- Wheezing: High-pitched sounds produced by narrowed airways. They are most often heard when a person breathes out (exhales). Wheezing and other abnormal sounds can sometimes be heard without a stethoscope.

== Other tests of auscultation ==
A clinician auscultating the posterior lung of a patient.

Pectoriloquy, egophony and bronchophony are tests of auscultation that utilize the phenomenon of vocal resonance. Clinicians can utilize these tests during a physical exam to screen for pathological lung disease. For example, in whispered pectoriloquy, the person being examined whispers a two syllable number as the clinician listens over the lung fields. The whisper is not normally heard over the lungs, but if heard may be indicative of pulmonary consolidation in that area. This is because sound travels differently through denser (fluid or solid) media than the air that should normally be predominant in lung tissue. In egophony, the person being examined continually speaks the English long-sound "E" (/i/). The lungs are usually air filled, but if there is an abnormal solid component due to infection, fluid, or tumor, the higher frequencies of the "E" sound will be diminished. This changes the sound produced, from a long "E" sound to a long "A" sound (/eɪ/).

d'Espine sign is bronchial breathing heard over the vertebral spines below the fourth thoracic spine in adults, and is suggestive of subcarinal (mediastinal) lymphadenopathy.

== History ==
In 1957, Robertson and Coope proposed the two main categories of adventitious (added) lung sounds. Those categories were "Continuous" and "Interrupted" (or non-continuous). In 1976, the International Lung Sound Association simplified the sub-categories as follows:

Continuous

Wheezes (>400 Hz)
Rhonchi (<200 Hz)

Discontinuous

Fine crackles
Coarse crackles

Several sources will also refer to "medium" crackles, as a crackling sound that seems to fall between the coarse and fine crackles. Crackles are defined as discrete sounds that last less than 250 ms, while the continuous sounds (rhonchi and wheezes) last approximately 250 ms. Rhonchi are usually caused by a stricture or blockage in the upper airway. These are different from stridor.

== See also ==
- Imaging Lung Sound Behavior with Vibration Response Imaging
