= Auscultare =

An auscultare, meaning 'to hear', 'to listen', was a person appointed in monasteries to hear monks read prayers, and instruct them on the reading of prayers, before they were admitted to read publicly in the church, or before the people. The purpose was to ensure the reading of prayers with a graceful tone or accent, so to make an impression on the hearers. (Note: Lanfranc, an 11th-century monk and scholar, is quoted as saying "Whoever is going to read or sing something in a monastery, if necessary, he must listen to him, i.e. the singer, before he begins" in his work Decreta pro ordinis S. Benedicti.)

== See also ==
- Auscultation
