= Egophony =

Increased resonance of voice

Egophony (British English, aegophony) is an increased resonance of voice sounds heard when auscultating the lungs, often caused by lung consolidation and fibrosis. It is due to enhanced transmission of high-frequency sound across fluid, such as in abnormal lung tissue, with lower frequencies filtered out. It results in a high-pitched nasal or bleating quality in the affected person's voice.

== Technique ==
While listening to the lungs with a stethoscope, the patient is asked to pronounce the modern English (more generally, post-Great Vowel Shift) long-E vowel sound.

== Interpretation ==
Stethoscopic auscultation of a clear lung field during this articulation will detect a sound matching that received through normal hearing; that is, the sound articulated by the patient will be clearly transmitted through the lung field and heard unchanged by the clinician. When the lung field is consolidated (filled with liquid or other solid mass such as tumor or fungus ball), the patient's spoken English long E will sound like a "pure-voweled" long E or a modern English long A without the latter's usual offglide. This effect occurs because the solid mass in the lung field will disproportionately dampen the articulated sound's acoustic overtones higher in the harmonic series, transmuting the English long E, in which higher overtones predominate strongly, to a sound (the English long A) in which higher overtones predominate only slightly, i.e., to a markedly lesser degree than in the former sound. This finding is referred to in clinical contexts as the "E to A transition." If associated with fever, shortness of breath, and cough, this E to A transition indicates pneumonia.

== Related terms and techniques ==
Somewhat related, bronchophony, a form of pectoriloquy, is a conventional respiratory examination whereby the clinician auscultates the chest while asking the patient to repeat the word "ninety-nine". Better phrases in English include "toy boat”, "Scooby Doo", and “blue balloons". In the UK, regional variation with clinicians from Edinburgh to Glasgow use the phrase "one-one-one" due to its more rounded sound.

Similar terms are bronchophony and whispered pectoriloquy. The mechanism is the same; that is, fluid or consolidation causes the sound of the voice to be transmitted loudly to the periphery of the lungs where it is usually not heard.

== Causes ==
- Pleural effusion, though egophony is only heard above the level of the effusion in an upright patient.
- Pneumonia (lung consolidation)
- Fibrosis

== Etymology ==
Egophony comes from the Greek word for "goat," (αἴξ aix, aig-) in reference to the bleating quality of the sound.

== See also ==
- Vocal fremitus
