= Pectoriloquy =

- Differential diagnosis: pneumonia

Pectoriloquy is the increased resonance of the voice through the lung structures, so that it is clearly comprehensible using a stethoscope on the chest. It usually indicates consolidation of the underlying lung parenchyma.

Types include egophony and bronchophony.

== See also ==
- Whispered pectoriloquy
- Vocal fremitus
