= Barrel chest =

Term for a broad, deep ribcage

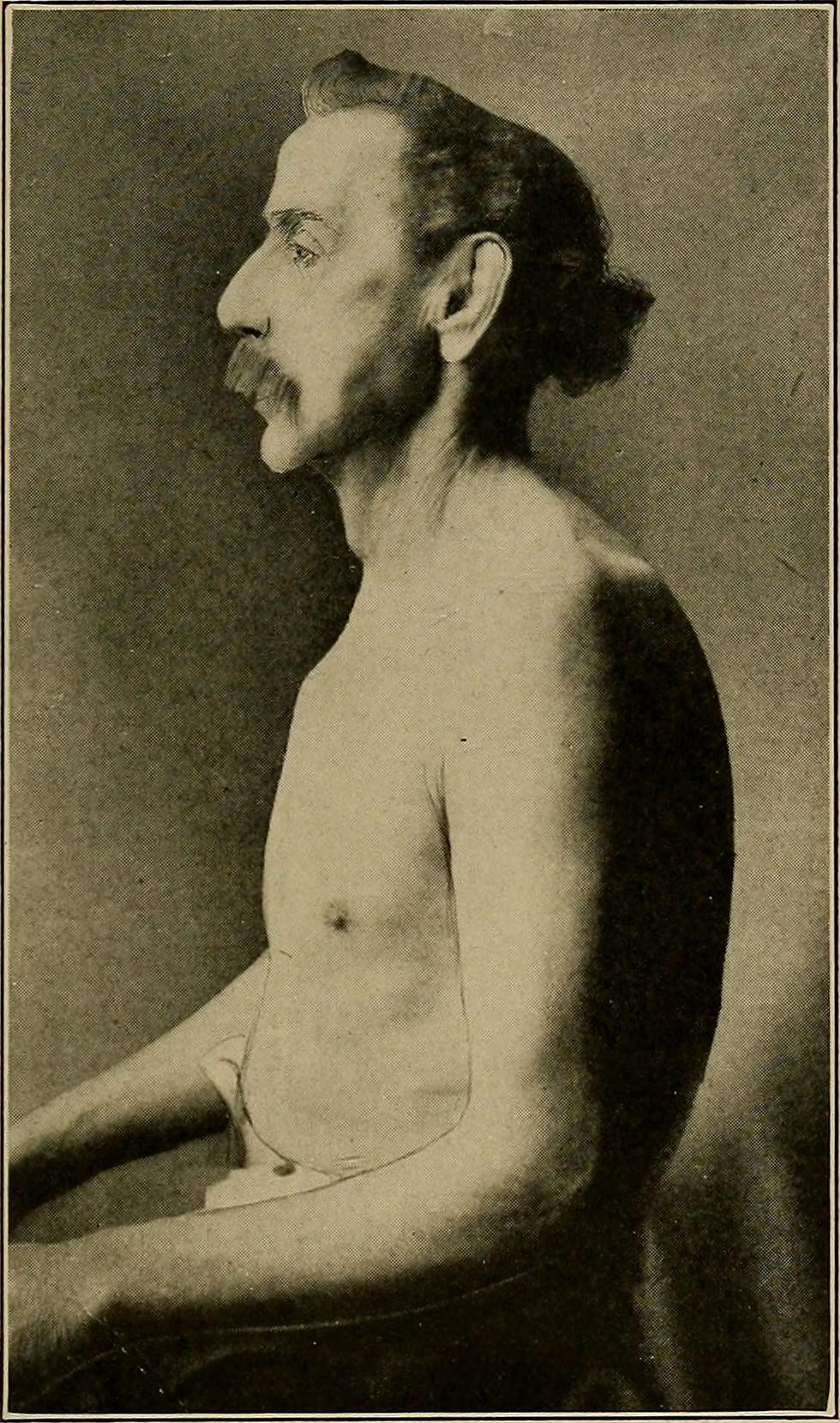
Barrel chest due to chronic bronchitis and emphysema.

Barrel chest generally refers to a broad, deep chest found on a person. A barrel chested person will usually have a naturally large ribcage, very round (i.e., vertically cylindrical) torso, large lung capacity, and can potentially have great upper body strength. It can sometimes be found alongside acromegaly (an enlargement of the extremities resulting from excess levels of human growth hormone (HGH) in the body). Barrel chest, as a medical condition, is most commonly related to osteoarthritis as individuals age. Arthritis can stiffen the chest causing the ribs to become fixed in their most expanded position, giving the appearance of a barrel chest.

Barrel chest refers to an increase in the anteroposterior diameter of the chest wall resembling the shape of a barrel, most often associated with emphysema. There are two main causes of the barrel chest phenomenon in emphysema:

1. Increased compliance of the lungs leads to the accumulation of air pockets inside the thoracic cavity.
2. Increased compliance of the lungs increases the intrathoracic pressure. This increase in pressure allows the chest wall to naturally move outward.

== See also ==
- Barrel
- Pectus carinatum (convex but peaked)
- Pectus excavatum (concave, sunken)
- Respiratory examination
