= Peribronchial cuffing =

Localized patches of lung collapse caused by excess fluid or mucus buildup

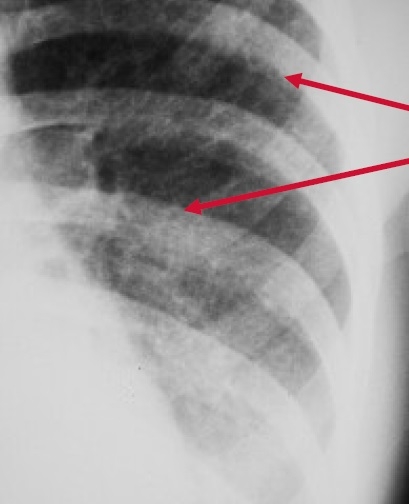

Peribronchial cuffing, also referred to as peribronchial thickening or bronchial wall thickening, is a radiologic sign which occurs when excess fluid or mucus buildup in the small airway passages of the lung causes localized patches of atelectasis (lung collapse). This causes the area around the bronchus to appear more prominent on an X-ray. It has also been described as donut sign, considering the edge is thicker, and the center contains air.

== Examples ==
Peribronchial cuffing is seen in a number of conditions including:

- Acute bronchitis
- Asthma following exercise or during an acute episode
- Bronchiolitis
- Bronchopulmonary dysplasia
- Congestive heart failure
- Cystic fibrosis
- Diffuse parenchymal lung disease
- Extreme exertion through physical exercise
- Hantavirus pulmonary syndrome
- Human metapneumovirus
- Kawasaki disease
- Lung cancer
- Pneumonia
- Pulmonary edema
- Smoke inhalation

== Treatment ==
As peribronchial cuffing is a sign rather than a symptom or condition, there is no specific treatment except to treat the underlying cause.
