= Triangle of auscultation =

Human anatomical feature

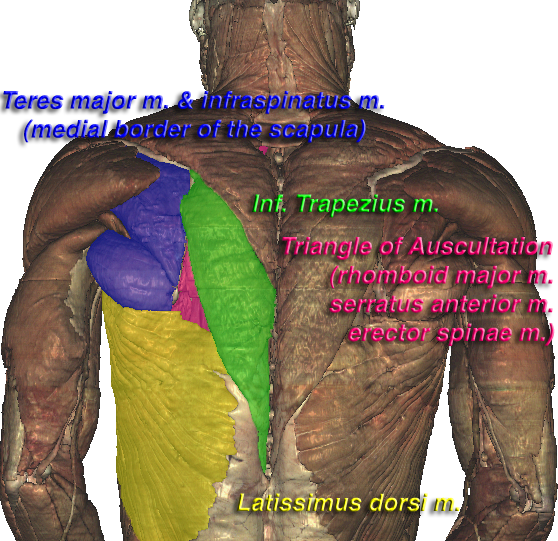
- Triangle of auscultation (shown in pink) of the Visible Human Male

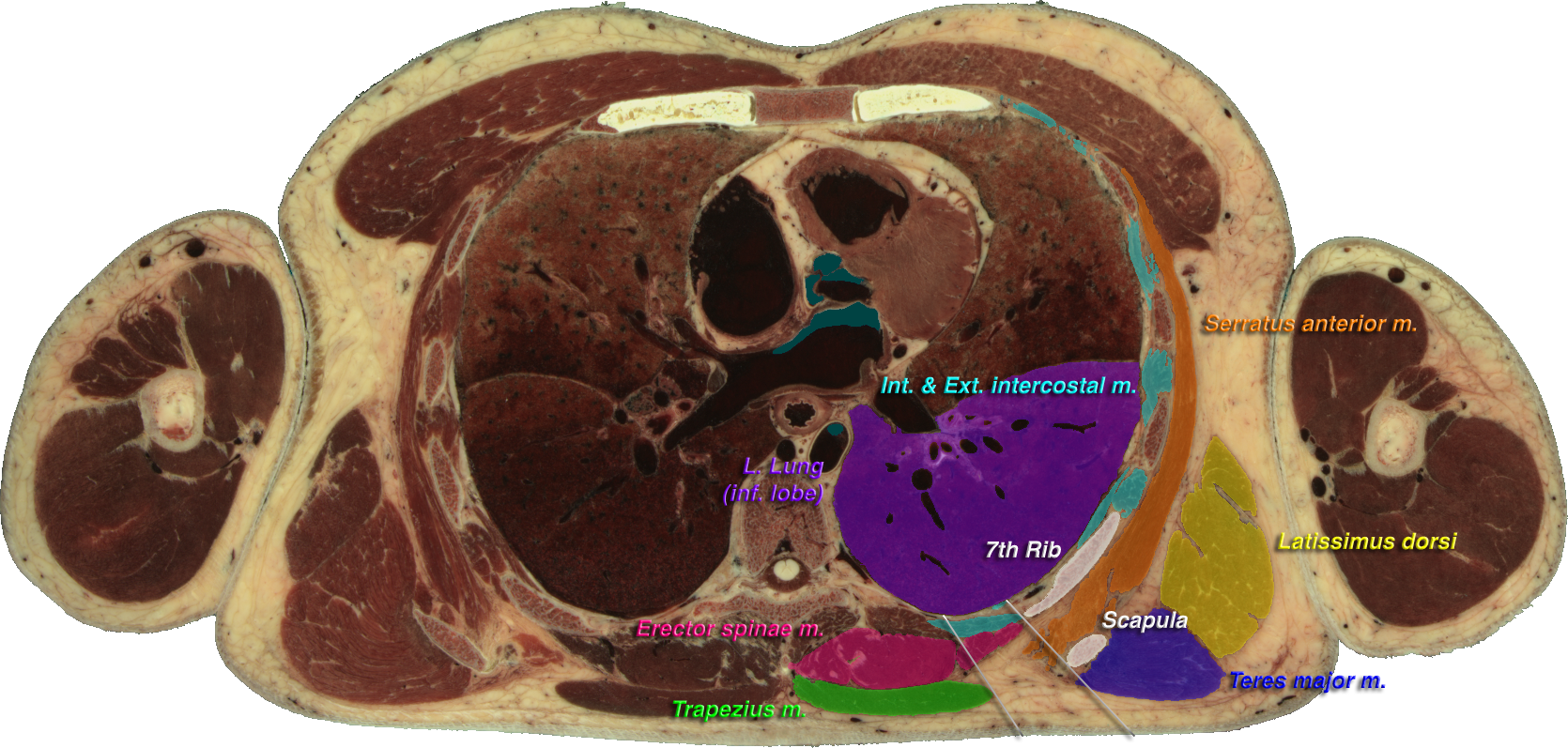
- Cross section #1428 of the Visible Human Male showing the structures of the triangle of auscultation

Details

Identifiers
- Latin: trigonum auscultationis
- TA98: A01.2.05.006
- TA2: 267
- FMA: 75022

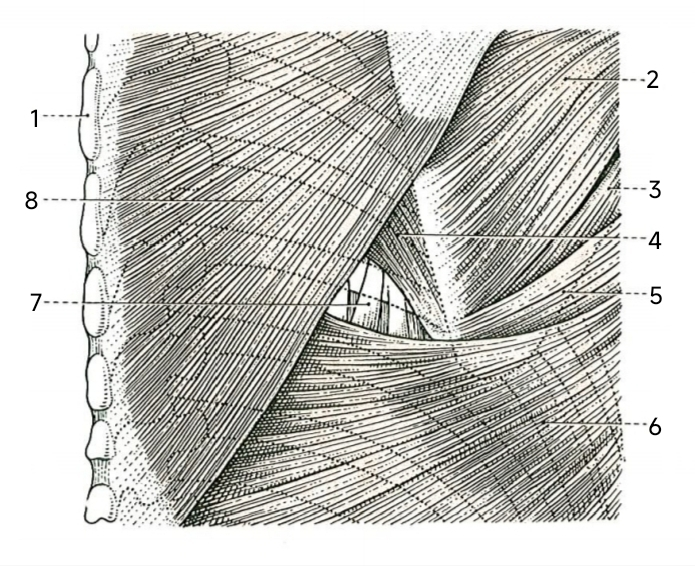
Right-sided triangle of auscultation. 1, Ligne épineuse — 2, Supraspinatus m. — 3, Teres minor m. — 4, Rhomboid major m. — 5, Teres major m. — 6, Latissimus dorsi m. — 7, Iliocostalis m. (thoracic portion) — 8, Trapezius m. (After Charpy.)

The triangle of auscultation is a relative thinning of the musculature of the back, situated along the medial border of the scapula which allows for improved listening to the lungs. It is bounded by trapezius medially, laterally scapula and inferiorly latissimus dorsi.

== Boundaries ==
It has the following boundaries:

- medially, by the inferior portion of the trapezius
- inferiorly, by the latissimus dorsi
- laterally, by the medial border of the scapula

The superficial floor of the triangle is made up by the iliocostalis (thoracic portion) and rhomboid major muscles. Deep to these muscles are the osseous portions of the 6th and 7th ribs and the internal and external intercostal muscles.

== Clinical significance ==
The triangle of auscultation is useful for assessment using a pulmonary auscultation and thoracic procedures. Due to the relative thinning of the musculature of the back in the triangle, the posterior thoracic wall is closer to the skin surface, making respiratory sounds audible more clearly with a stethoscope. On the left side, the cardiac orifice of the stomach lies deep to the triangle. In days before X-rays were discovered, the sound of swallowed liquids were auscultated over this triangle to confirm an oesophageal tumour. To better expose the floor of the triangle up of the posterior thoracic wall in the 6th and 7th intercostal space, a patient is asked to fold their arms across their chest, laterally rotating the scapulae, while bending forward at the trunk, somewhat resembling the fetal position.

The triangle of auscultation can be used as a surgical approach path. It can also be used for applying a nerve block known as the rhomboid intercostal block, which can be used to relieve pain after rib fractures, and a thoracotomy. This nerve block is usually achieved by injection of the local anesthetic agent into the fascial plane between the rhomboid upper intercostal muscle and the rhombic muscles.
