= Palpation =

Process of using one's hands to check the body

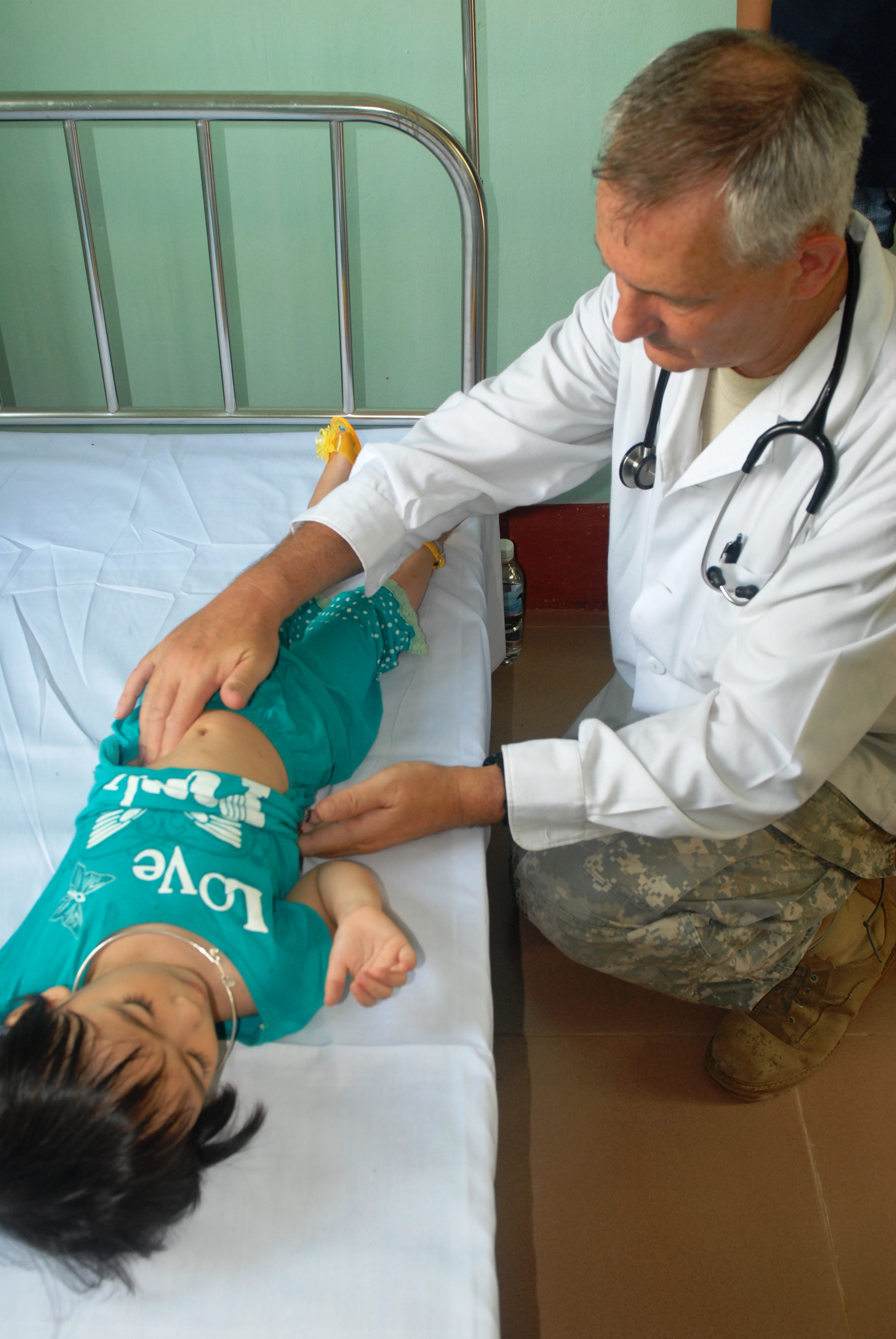
- Palpation of a child's abdomen
- MeSH: D010173
- MedlinePlus: 002284

Palpation is the process of using one's hands to check the body, especially while perceiving/diagnosing a disease or illness. Usually performed by a health care practitioner, it is the process of feeling an object in or on the body to determine its size, shape, firmness, or location (for example, a veterinarian can feel the stomach of a pregnant animal to ensure good health and successful delivery).

Palpation is an important part of the physical examination; the sense of touch is just as important in this examination as the sense of sight is. Physicians develop great skill in palpating problems below the surface of the body, becoming able to detect things that untrained persons would not. Mastery of anatomy and much practice are required to achieve a high level of skill. The concept of being able to detect or notice subtle tactile signs and to recognize their significance or implications is called appreciating them (just as in general vocabulary one can speak of appreciating the importance of something). Nonetheless, some things are not palpable, which is why additional medical tests, such as medical imaging and laboratory tests, are often needed to make a diagnosis. However, many other problems are palpable. Examples include pulses, abdominal distension, cardiac thrills, fremitus, and various hernias, joint dislocations, bone fractures, and tumors, among others.

== Uses ==
Palpation is used by physicians, as well as chiropractors, nurses, massage therapists, physical therapists, osteopaths and occupational therapists, to assess the texture of a patient's tissue (such as swelling or muscle tone), to locate the spatial coordinates of particular anatomical landmarks (e.g., to assess range and quality of joint motion), and assess tenderness through tissue deformation (e.g. provoking pain with pressure or stretching). In summary, palpation might be used either to determine painful areas and to qualify pain felt by patients, or to locate three-dimensional coordinates of anatomical landmarks to quantify some aspects of the palpated subject.

Palpation is typically used for thoracic and abdominal examinations, but can also be used to diagnose edema. Palpation is also a simple method of examining the pulse. It is used by veterinarians to check animals for pregnancy, and by midwives to determine the position of a fetus.

Quantitative palpation of anatomical landmarks for measurements must occur according to strict protocols if one wishes to achieve reproducible measurements. Palpation protocols are usually based on well-described definitions for the location of anatomical, usually skeletal, landmarks.

== Locating anatomical landmarks ==
Locating anatomical landmarks can be performed using two palpation protocols: 1) manual palpation that allows the spatial location of landmarks using hands combined or not with three-dimensional (3D) digitizing, and 2) virtual palpation on 3D computer models obtained, for example, from medical imaging.

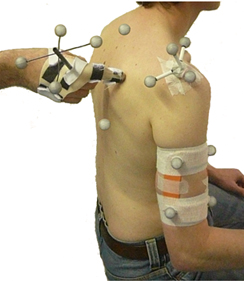
Manual palpation of skeletal landmarks combined with 3D digitizing (see text below for explanations).

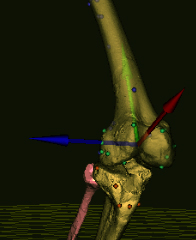
Virtual palpation of skeletal landmarks.

Manual palpation of skeletal landmarks (illustrated here on a patient's shoulder, see left image). The palpating hand locates the palpated landmarks with a satisfactory accuracy (below 1 cm). Reflective markers are part of the scientific protocol and allow further quantified motion analysis for joint disorders follow-up.
Virtual palpation of skeletal landmarks located on a 3D bone model (illustrated here on a patient's knee model obtained from medical imaging, see right image). Colored spheres on bones indicate palpated skeletal landmarks. This method combined with quantified manual palpation allows subject-specific visualization of joint behavior during particular motion tasks (e.g., walking, stair climbing, etc.).

The above protocols can be used independently. Manual palpation is used in clinical activities for various aims: identification of painful areas; positioning of particular pieces of equipment (electromyography electrodes, auscultation, external landmarks used in clinical motion analysis or body surface scanning); or measurements of morphological parameters (e.g., limb length). Virtual palpation alone is useful to quantify individual morphological parameters from medical imaging: limb length; limb orientation; joint angle; or distance between various skeletal locations.

Combining data from both manual and virtual palpation protocols allows achieving supplementary analysis: registration protocols aiming at building reference frames for motion representation according reproducible clinical conventions; to modelize joint kinematics accurately during musculoskeletal analysis; to align precisely orthopedic tools according to the individual anatomy of a patient; or to wrap and to scale surface textures to motion data when creating animation characters.

Use of standardized definitions for the above activities allows better result comparison and exchange; this is a key element for patient follow-up or the elaboration of quality clinical and research databases. Such definitions also allow acceptable repeat ability by individuals with different backgrounds (physiotherapists, medical doctors, nurses, engineers, etc.). If applied strictly, these definitions allow better data exchange and result comparison thanks to standardization of the procedure. Without anatomical landmark standardization, palpation is prone to error and poorly reproducible.

== Elastography ==
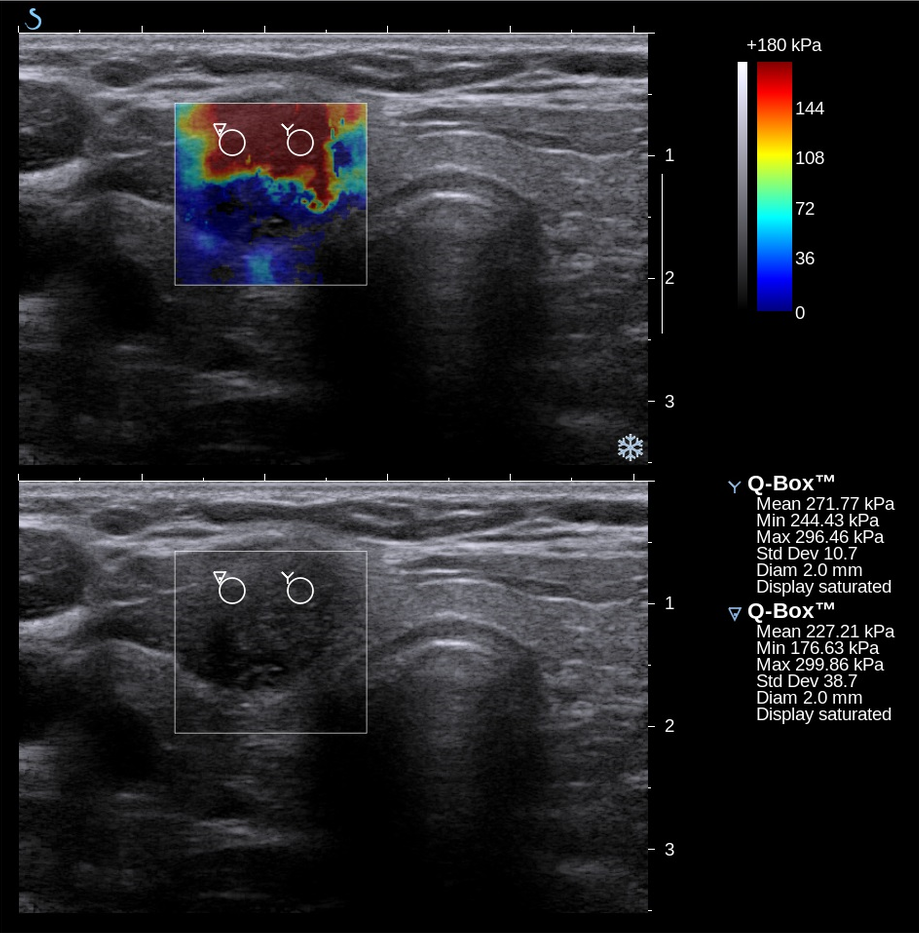
Conventional ultrasonography (lower image) and elastography (supersonic shear imaging; upper image) of papillary thyroid carcinoma, a malignant cancer. The cancer (red) is much stiffer than the healthy tissue.

Nowadays, the medical imaging modality of elastography can also be used to determine the stiffness of tissues. Manual palpation has several important limitations: it is limited to tissues accessible to the physician's hand, it is distorted by any intervening tissue, and it is qualitative but not quantitative. Elastography is able to overcome many these challenges and improve on the benefits of palpation.

Elastography is a relatively new technology and entered the clinic primarily in the last decade. The most prominent techniques use ultrasound or magnetic resonance imaging (MRI) to make both the stiffness map and an anatomical image for comparison.

=== Computerized palpation ===
While not widespread amongst elastography methods, computerized palpation is of interest here because it essentially uses palpation to measure the stiffness, whereas other techniques will obtain data using other methods. Computerized palpation, also called "tactile imaging", "mechanical imaging" or "stress imaging", is a medical imaging modality that translates the sense of touch into a digital image. The tactile image is a function of P(x,y,z), where P is the pressure on soft tissue surface under applied deformation and x,y,z are coordinates where pressure P was measured. Tactile imaging closely mimics manual palpation, since the probe of the device with a pressure sensor array mounted on its face acts similar to human fingers during clinical examination, slightly deforming soft tissue by the probe and detecting resulting changes in the pressure pattern.

== Palpation under general anesthesia ==
Palpation under general anesthesia is sometimes necessary, such as when there is a need to palpate structures deep in the abdominal or pelvic cavity, since it would otherwise cause considerable patient discomfort and subsequent contraction of the abdominal muscles, which would make the examination difficult. It is used, for example, in the staging of cervical cancer.

== See also ==
- Physical examination
- Inspection
- Percussion - examination by tapping the body
- Elastography
- Auscultation - examining a patient by listening to internal sounds
- Motion analysis
- Medical imaging
- Tactile imaging
