= Pulmonary infiltrate =

Substance denser than air and associated with lung disease

A pulmonary infiltrate is a substance denser than air, such as pus, blood, or protein, which lingers within the parenchyma of the lungs. Pulmonary infiltrates are associated with pneumonia, tuberculosis, and sarcoidosis. Valvular heart diseases, such as mitral regurgitation, may also lead to the formation of infiltrates.

Pulmonary infiltrates can be observed on a chest radiograph.

== See also ==
- Ground-glass opacity
- Pulmonary consolidation
