= Squawk (sound) =

Wheezing sound

Squawks, or short wheezes, are brief, "squeaky" sounds; they are also referred to as squeaks. Their waveforms show a sinusoidal pattern with a duration 10 to 100 ms and a frequency between 200 and 800 Hz.

Many birds have made sounds which are onomatopoeically described as "squawk". Squawks have been described in bird fancier's disease and other forms of hypersensitivity pneumonitis.

In humans, squawks are also heard in a variety of conditions in which alveolitis is present. In one study they were found in 10% of patients with pneumonia.
