= D'Espine sign =

Medical sign

d'Espine sign is a bronchial breathing heard over the vertebral spines (on the back) below the level of tracheal bifurcation; below the fourth thoracic spine in adults if there is subcarinal (mediastinal) lymphadenopathy.

It is named for Swiss paediatrician Jean-Henri-Adolphe d'Espine (1846-1930).
