= Pericardial friction rub =

Medical sign

A pericardial friction rub, also pericardial rub, is an audible medical sign used in the diagnosis of pericarditis. Upon auscultation, this sign is an extra heart sound of to-and-fro character, typically with three components, two systolic and one diastolic. It resembles the sound of squeaky leather and often is described as grating, scratching, or rasping. The sound seems very close to the ear and may seem louder than or may even mask the other heart sounds. The sound usually is best heard between the apex and sternum but may be widespread.

== Cause ==
The pericardium is a double-walled sac around the heart. The inner and outer (visceral and parietal, respectively) layers are normally lubricated by a small amount of pericardial fluid, but the inflammation of pericardium causes the walls to rub against each other with audible friction. In children, rheumatic fever is often the cause of pericardial friction rub. Pericardial friction rubs can also be heard in pericarditis that is associated with uremia or post-myocardial infarction.

== Differential diagnosis ==
Pericardial friction rub is one of several, similar sounds. A differential diagnosis may be possible, or not, depending upon the number of components that are audible. Pericardial friction rub may have one, two, or three audible components, whereas the similar pleural friction rub ordinarily has two audible components. One- and two-component rubs are ambiguous. A three-component rub distinguishes a pericardial rub and indicates the presence of pericarditis. Also, a pleural rub can only be heard during inspiration, whereas, the pericardial rub can be heard even after cessation of breathing. Pleural rub creates pain mostly on the lateral part of the chest wall, whereas pain due to pericardial rub is always central in location. The intensity of pleural rub is increased on pressing the diaphragm of the stethoscope over the affected area, whereas there is no such change in case of a pericardial rub.

== See also ==
- Precordial exam
