= Whispered pectoriloquy =

- Differential diagnosis: pneumonia, cancer (solid mass)

Whispered pectoriloquy refers to an increased loudness of whispering noted during auscultation with a stethoscope on the lung fields on a patient's torso.

Usually spoken sounds of a whispered volume by the patient would not be heard by the clinician auscultating a lung field with a stethoscope. However, in areas of the lung where there is lung consolidation, these whispered spoken sounds by the patient (such as saying 'ninety-nine') will be clearly heard through the stethoscope. This increase in sound exists because sound travels faster and thus with lower loss of intensity through liquid or solid ("fluid mass" or "solid mass," respectively, in the lung) versus gaseous (air in the lung) media. Whispered pectoriloquy is a clinical test typically performed during a medical physical examination to evaluate for the presence of lung consolidation, causes of which include cancer (solid mass) and pneumonia (fluid mass).

== Related tests ==
The whispered pectoriloquy test is similar to bronchophony, but not so much egophony. In bronchophony, the physician often asks the patient to say "ninety-nine" or "baseball" while listening over a lung field with a stethoscope. The spoken word sounds will be louder in areas where consolidation is present. The only difference between whispered pectoriloquy and bronchophony is the volume at which the patient is asked by the clinician to repeat "ninety-nine" or "baseball." That is, in whispered pectoriloquy, the repeated words are whispered at low volume, and in bronchophony, they are spoken at normal volume. The clinical observation being determined is whether or not an increase in volume is heard at the clinician's stethoscope over the lung field being auscultated which would indicate lung consolidation.

In UK bronchophony is often called "vocal resonance" and is similar to "tactile vocal fremitus" (TVF); the difference being that in TVF the sensor is the edge of the hand. All three - whispering pectoriloquy, TVF and vocal resonance - fulfill the same purpose, to distinguish between consolidation and pleural effusion, both of which cause dullness to percussion. This does not mean that these tests are not necessary if there is no abnormal dullness to percussion because the likelihood ratio (as well as sensitivity and specificity) of each test is different

== History ==
The choice of "ninety-nine" is the unfortunate result of a literal translation. The test was originally described by a German physician who used the phrase "neunundneunzig" (pronounced [ˈnɔʏnʊntˈnɔʏntsɪç]), which he found would cause maximum vibration of the chest. The translation, "ninety-nine", has fewer vowels and is less effective in evoking the phenomenon. Better phrases in English include "toy boat", "Scooby Doo", and "blue balloons".

== Etymology ==
'Pectoriloquy' is derived from the Latin words pectus or pectoris meaning chest or breast, and -loquy or loquor which means to speak.

== See also ==
- Vocal fremitus
- Tactile fremitus
