= Wheeze =

Coarse whistling sound from breathing

Wheezing
- Other names: Sibilant rhonchi
- The sound of wheezing as heard with a stethoscope
- Specialty: Pulmonology
- Causes: virus, bacteria, common cold, allergy, pneumonia, asthma, tuberculosis

A wheeze is a clinical symptom of a continuous, coarse, whistling sound produced in the respiratory airways during breathing. For wheezes to occur, part of the respiratory tree must be narrowed or obstructed (for example narrowing of the lower respiratory tract in an asthmatic attack), or airflow velocity within the respiratory tree must be heightened. Wheezing is commonly experienced by persons with a lung disease; the most common cause of recurrent wheezing is asthma, though it can also be a symptom of lung cancer, congestive heart failure, and certain types of heart diseases.

The differential diagnosis of wheezing is wide, and the reason for wheezing in a given patient is determined by considering the characteristics of the wheezes and the historical and clinical findings made by the examining physician.

The term "wheeze" is also used as a clinical condition describing wheezing in preschool children, termed as "preschool wheeze".

== Clinical symptom ==
=== Wheeze ===
Wheezes occupy different portions of the respiratory cycle depending on the site of airway obstruction and its nature. The fraction of the respiratory cycle during which a wheeze is produced roughly corresponds to the degree of airway obstruction. Bronchiolar disease usually causes wheezing that occurs in the expiratory phase of respiration. As a rule, extrathoracic airway obstruction produce inspiratory sounds. Intrathoracic major airway obstruction produces inspiratory as well as expiratory sounds. Distal airway obstruction predominantly produces expiratory sounds.

The presence of expiratory phase wheezing signifies that the patient's peak expiratory flow rate is less than 50% of normal. Wheezing heard in the inspiratory phase, on the other hand, is often a sign of a stiff stenosis, usually caused by tumors, foreign bodies or scarring. This is especially true if the wheeze is monotonal, occurs throughout the inspiratory phase (i.e. is "holoinspiratory"), and is heard more proximally, in the trachea. Inspiratory wheezing also occurs in hypersensitivity pneumonitis. Wheezes heard at the end of both expiratory and inspiratory phases usually signify the periodic opening of deflated alveoli, as occurs in some diseases that lead to collapse of parts of the lungs.

The location of the wheeze can also be an important clue to the diagnosis. Diffuse processes that affect most parts of the lungs are more likely to produce wheezing that may be heard throughout the chest via a stethoscope. Localized processes, such as the occlusion of a portion of the respiratory tree, are more likely to produce wheezing at that location, hence the sound will be loudest and radiate outwardly. The pitch of a wheeze does not reliably predict the degree of narrowing in the affected airway.

=== Stridor ===
A special type of wheeze is stridor. Stridor — the word is from the Latin, strīdor — is a harsh, high-pitched, vibrating sound that is heard in respiratory tract obstruction. Stridor heard solely in the inspiratory phase of respiration usually indicates an upper respiratory tract obstruction, "as with aspiration of a foreign body (such as the fabled pediatric peanut)." Stridor in the inspiratory phase is usually heard with obstruction in the upper airways, such as the trachea, epiglottis, or larynx; because a block here means that no air may reach either lung, this condition is a medical emergency. Biphasic stridor (occurring during both the inspiratory and expiratory phases) indicates narrowing at the level of the glottis or subglottis, the point between the upper and lower airways.

== Preschool wheeze ==
Preschool wheezing is a clinical condition that describes wheezing preschool children that do not fulfill the criteria of "asthma" fully as asthma would require a person to demonstrate a history of at least three episodes of exacerbations (worsening of symptoms) or chronic cough or wheeze for the past six months. Besides, a number of wheezing preschool children would have their symptoms resolved after they had grown up, unlike asthma which persists into adulthood. Preschool wheezing can be divided into "viral-induced wheeze" and "multi-trigger wheeze". Viral-induced wheezing accounts for about two-thirds of all preschool wheezes. The wheezing symptom is episodic and the child is completely normal in between wheezing episodes. It has a good prognosis and only supportive treatment is required. Meanwhile, multi-trigger wheezing is associated with allergy and a family history of asthma. Symptoms occur in between wheezing episodes and are likely to persist beyond early childhood. Due to difficulty in differentiating both types of wheeze, the diagnosis of viral-induced versus multi-trigger wheeze may be delayed for a period of time until its clinical course has become clear.

== Wheeze (slang) ==
Saturday the 14th "merely resurrects a passel of haunted-house wheezes so antique that even the Bowery Boys would be driven to groans by them". - Tom Shales, The Washington Post

== To wheeze (slang) ==
To wheeze implies an inability to speak clearly, so in politics it refers to an unorthodox or less than ethical maneuver that is not actually illegal, but relies on an element of deception or sleight of hand, being an intermediate between a workaround and a scam.

In this context wheezing is notably linked with the slang expression Joe Blow meaning any external person or group beyond a secretive fraternity. (See also insider trading.)

== See also ==
- Crackles (also called "crepitations" or "rales")
- Rhonchi
- Squawk (sound)
