= Crackles =

Respiratory sounds associated with abnormal lung conditions

- Other names: Crepitations, rales
- Crackles heard in the lungs of a person with pneumonia using a stethoscope.
- Pronunciation: /ˈrɑːlz/ RAHLZ or /ˈrælz/ RALZ
- Specialty: Pulmonology

Crackles are the clicking, rattling, or crackling noises that may be made by one or both lungs of a human or animal with a respiratory disease during inhalation, and occasionally during exhalation. They are usually heard only with a stethoscope ("on auscultation"). Pulmonary crackles are abnormal breath sounds that were formerly referred to as rales.

Bilateral crackles refers to the presence of crackles in both lungs. Basal crackles are crackles apparently originating in or near the base of the lung. Bibasal crackles, also called bilateral basal crackles, are crackles heard at the bases of both the left and right lungs.

Crackles are caused by the "popping open" of small airways and alveoli collapsed by fluid, exudate, or lack of aeration during expiration.

Crackles can be heard in people or animals who have pneumonia, atelectasis, pulmonary fibrosis, acute bronchitis, bronchiectasis, acute respiratory distress syndrome (ARDS), interstitial lung disease or post thoracotomy or metastasis ablation. Pulmonary edema secondary to left-sided congestive heart failure and high altitude pulmonary edema can also cause crackles.

== Terminology ==
René Laennec adopted the existing word râles (which has been translated as "rattles", "groans" and otherwise) to describe the added breath sounds that are now referred to as "crackles". He described them using unusual daily examples, such as "whistling of little birds", "crackling of salt on a heated dish", "cooing of the woodpidgeon", etc., but he soon realized that he was unable to use the term in front of his patients because it conjured the association of le râle de la mort, which translates to "the death rattle", the noise that people who are about to die make when they can no longer clear secretions. Therefore, at the bedside, he used the Latin word rhonchus, which originally meant a "snore". That was not clearly understood by his translator, John Forbes, and the terminology became very confusing after the publication in the 1830s of Forbes's English translation of Laennec's De L'Auscultation Mediate. The difficulty of translating râle itself had been remarked upon in a British review of Laennec's work in 1820.

The terminology of rales and rhonchi in English remained variable until 1977, when a standardization was established by the American Thoracic Society and American College of Chest Physicians. As a result, the term râles was abandoned, and crackles became its recommended substitute. The term rales is still common in English-language medical literature, but cognizance of the ATS/CHEST guidelines calls for crackles.

== Sound ==
Crackles are caused by explosive opening of small airways and are discontinuous, nonmusical, and brief. Crackles are more common during the inspiratory than the expiratory phase of breathing, but they may be heard during the expiratory phase.

- Crackles are often described as fine, medium, and coarse. They can also be characterized as to their timing: fine crackles are usually late-inspiratory, whereas coarse crackles are early inspiratory.
  - Fine crackles are soft, high-pitched, and very brief. This sound can be simulated by rolling a strand of hair between one's fingers near the ears or by moistening one's thumb and index finger and separating them near the ears. Their presence usually indicates an interstitial process, such as pulmonary fibrosis or congestive heart failure. The sounds from interstitial pulmonary fibrosis have been described as sounding like opening a Velcro fastener.
  - Coarse crackles are somewhat louder, lower in pitch, and last longer than fine crackles. Their presence usually indicates an airway disease, such as bronchiectasis.

They can also be described as unilateral or bilateral, as well as dry or moist/wet.

== Associated diagnoses ==
Crackles are often associated with inflammation or infection of the small bronchi, bronchioles, and alveoli.

Crackles that do not clear after a cough may indicate pulmonary edema or fluid in the alveoli due to heart failure, pulmonary fibrosis, or acute respiratory distress syndrome. Crackles that partially clear or change after coughing may indicate bronchiectasis.

== Interobserver consistency ==
In 2016, the European Respiratory Society reported on a study of various physicians listening to audiovisual recordings of auscultation findings and interobserver variation was analyzed. The study found that broad descriptions agreed better than detailed descriptions.

== See also ==
- Bronchophony
- Egophony
- Consumption
- Whooping cough
- Croup
- Pertussis toxin
- Allergic asthma
- Respiratory sounds
