= Pulmonology =

Study of respiratory diseases

- Schematic view of the human respiratory system with their parts and functions
- System: Respiratory
- Significant diseases: Asthma, Lung cancer, Tuberculosis, Occupational lung disease
- Significant tests: Bronchoscopy, Sputum studies, Arterial blood gases
- Specialist: Respiratory Physician, Pulmonologist

Pulmonology (/ˌpʌlməˈnɒlədʒi/, /ˌpʊlməˈnɒlədʒi/, from Latin pulmō, -ōnis "lung" and the Greek suffix -λογία -logía "study of"), pneumology (/nʊˈmɒlədʒi, njʊ-/, built on Greek πνεύμων pneúmōn "lung") or pneumonology (/nʊmənˈɒlədʒi, njʊ-/) is a medical specialty that deals with diseases involving the respiratory tract. It is also known as respirology, respiratory medicine, or chest medicine in some countries and areas.

Pulmonology is considered a branch of internal medicine, and is related to intensive care medicine. Pulmonology often involves managing patients who need life support and mechanical ventilation. Pulmonologists are specially trained in diseases and conditions of the chest, particularly pneumonia, asthma, tuberculosis, emphysema, and complicated chest infections.

Pulmonology/respirology departments work especially closely with certain other specialties: cardiothoracic surgery departments and cardiology departments.

== Journals of pulmonology ==
- American Association for Respiratory Care
- American College of Chest Physicians
- American Lung Association
- American Thoracic Society
- British Thoracic Society
- European Respiratory Society

== History of pulmonology ==
One of the first major discoveries relevant to the field of pulmonology was the discovery of pulmonary circulation. Originally, it was thought that blood reaching the right side of the heart passed through small 'pores' in the septum into the left side to be oxygenated, as theorized by Galen; however, the discovery of pulmonary circulation disproves this theory, which had previously been accepted since the 2nd century. Thirteenth-century anatomist and physiologist Ibn Al-Nafis accurately theorized that there was no 'direct' passage between the two sides (ventricles) of the heart. He believed that the blood must have passed through the pulmonary artery, through the lungs, and back into the heart to be pumped around the body. This is believed by many to be the first scientific description of pulmonary circulation.

Although pulmonary medicine only began to evolve as a medical specialty in the 1950s, William Welch and William Osler founded the 'parent' organization of the American Thoracic Society, the National Association for the Study and Prevention of Tuberculosis. The care, treatment, and study of tuberculosis of the lung is recognised as a discipline in its own right, phthisiology. When the specialty began to evolve, several discoveries were being made linking the respiratory system and the measurement of arterial blood gases, attracting more and more physicians and researchers to the developing field.

== Pulmonology and its relevance in other medical fields ==
Surgery of the respiratory tract is generally performed by specialists in cardiothoracic surgery (or thoracic surgery), though minor procedures may be performed by pulmonologists. Pulmonology is closely related to critical care medicine when dealing with patients who require mechanical ventilation. As a result, many pulmonologists are certified to practice critical care medicine in addition to pulmonary medicine. There are fellowship programs that allow physicians to become board certified in pulmonary and critical care medicine simultaneously. Interventional pulmonology is a relatively new field within pulmonary medicine that deals with the use of procedures such as bronchoscopy and pleuroscopy to treat several pulmonary diseases. Interventional pulmonology is increasingly recognized as a specific medical specialty.

== Diagnosis ==
The pulmonologist begins the diagnostic process with a general review focusing on:

- hereditary diseases affecting the lungs (cystic fibrosis, alpha 1-antitrypsin deficiency)
- exposure to toxicants (tobacco smoke, asbestos, exhaust fumes, coal mining fumes, e-cigarette aerosol)
- exposure to infectious agents (certain types of birds, malt processing)
- an autoimmune diathesis that might predispose to certain conditions (pulmonary fibrosis, pulmonary hypertension)

Physical diagnostics are as important as in other fields of medicine.

- Inspection of the hands for signs of cyanosis or clubbing, the chest wall, and the respiratory rate.
- Palpation of the cervical lymph nodes, trachea and chest wall movement.
- Percussion of the lung fields for dullness or hyper-resonance.
- Auscultation (with a stethoscope) of the lung fields for diminished or unusual breath sounds.
  - Rales or rhonchi are heard over the lung fields with a stethoscope.

As many heart diseases can give pulmonary signs, a thorough cardiac investigation is usually included.

== Procedures ==
=== Clinical procedures ===
Pulmonary clinical procedures include the following pulmonary tests and procedures:

- Medical laboratory investigation of blood (blood tests). Sometimes arterial blood gas tests are also required.
- Spirometry is the determination of maximum airflow at a given lung volume as measured by breathing into a dedicated machine; this is the key test to diagnose airflow obstruction.
- Pulmonary function testing including spirometry, as above, plus response to bronchodilators, lung volumes, and diffusion capacity, the latter being a measure of lung oxygen absorptive area
- Bronchoscopy with bronchoalveolar lavage (BAL), endobronchial and transbronchial biopsy and epithelial brushing
- Chest X-rays
- CT scan
- Scintigraphy and other methods of nuclear medicine
- Positron emission tomography (especially in lung cancer)
- Polysomnography (sleep studies) is commonly used for the diagnosis of sleep apnea

=== Surgical procedures ===
Major surgical procedures on the heart and lungs are performed by a thoracic surgeon. Pulmonologists often perform specialized procedures to get samples from the inside of the chest or the inside of the lung. They use radiographic techniques to view the vasculature of the lungs and heart to assist with diagnosis.

== Treatment and therapeutics ==
Medication is the most important treatment for most diseases of pulmonology, either by inhalation (bronchodilators and steroids) or in oral form (antibiotics, leukotriene antagonists). A common example being the usage of inhalers in the treatment of inflammatory lung conditions such as asthma or chronic obstructive pulmonary disease. Oxygen therapy is often necessary in severe respiratory disease (emphysema and pulmonary fibrosis). When this is insufficient, the patient might require mechanical ventilation.

Pulmonary rehabilitation has been defined as a multidimensional continuum of services directed to persons with pulmonary disease and their families, usually by an interdisciplinary team of specialists, with the goal of achieving and maintaining the individual's maximum level of independence and functioning in the community. Pulmonary rehabilitation is intended to educate the patient, the family, and improve the overall quality of life and prognosis for the patient. Interventions can include exercise, education, emotional support, oxygen, noninvasive mechanical ventilation, optimization of airway secretion clearance, promoting compliance with medical care to reduce numbers of exacerbations and hospitalizations, and returning to work and/or a more active and emotionally satisfying life. These goals are appropriate for any patients with diminished respiratory reserve whether due to obstructive or intrinsic pulmonary diseases (oxygenation impairment) or neuromuscular weakness (ventilatory impairment). A pulmonary rehabilitation team may include a rehabilitation physician, a pulmonary medicine specialist, physician assistant and allied health professionals including a rehabilitation nurse, a respiratory therapist, a speech-language pathologist, a physical therapist, an occupational therapist, a psychologist, and a social worker among others. Additionally, breathing games are used to motivate children to perform pulmonary rehabilitation.

== Education and training ==
=== Pulmonologist ===
Pulmonologist
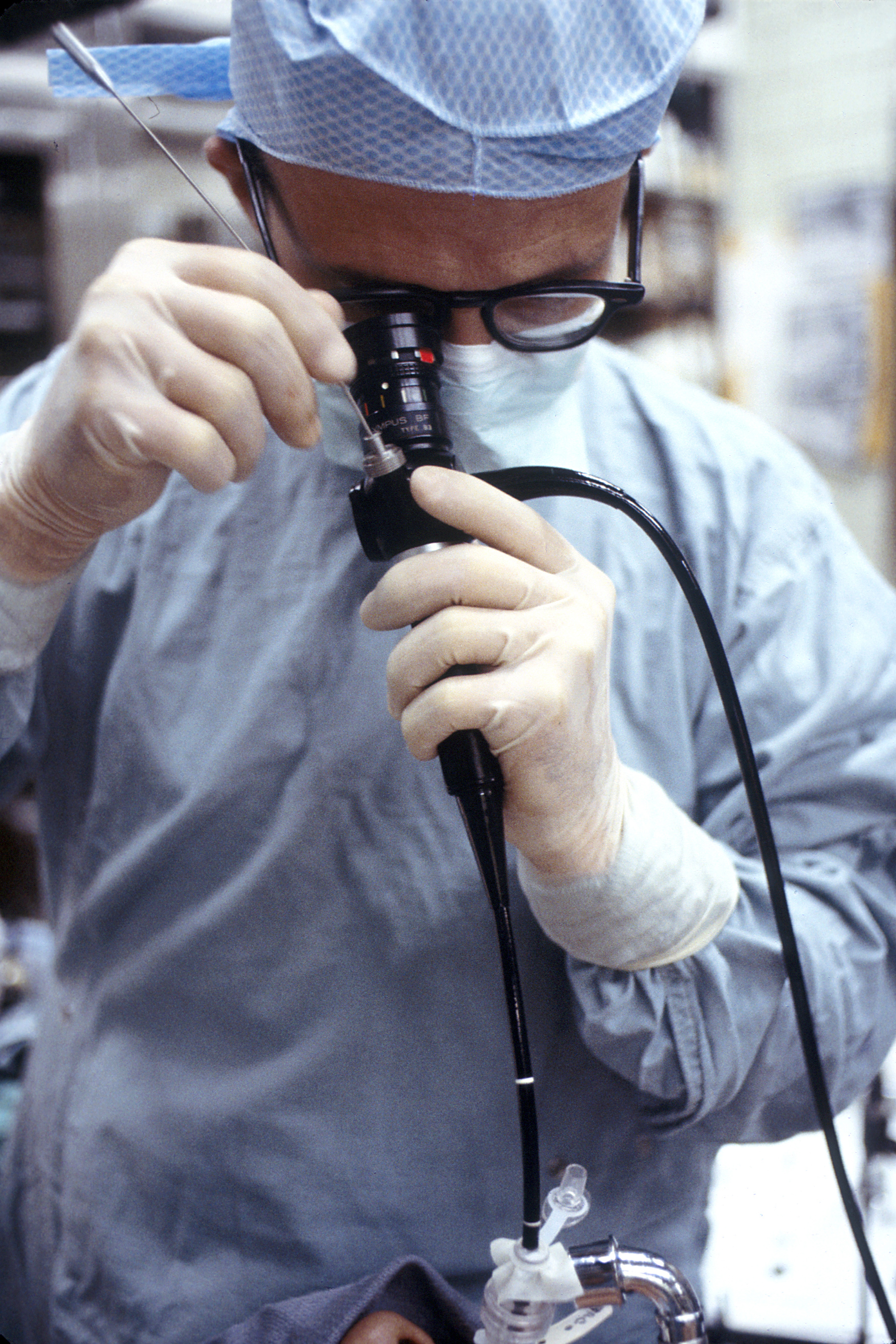
- Physician performing a bronchoscopy

Occupation
- Names: Pulmonologist; Pneumologist; Respirologist; Respiratory physician or chest physician
- Occupation type: Specialty
- Activity sectors: Medicine

Description
- Education required: Doctor of Medicine (M.D.); Doctor of Osteopathic Medicine (D.O.); Bachelor of Medicine, Bachelor of Surgery (MBBS/MBChB)
- Fields of employment: Hospitals, clinics

In the United States, pulmonologists are physicians who, after receiving a medical degree (MD or DO), complete residency training in internal medicine, followed by at least two additional years of subspeciality fellowship training in pulmonology. After satisfactorily completing a fellowship in pulmonary medicine, the physician is permitted to take the board certification examination in pulmonary medicine. After passing this exam, the physician is then board certified as a pulmonologist. Most pulmonologists complete three years of combined subspecialty fellowship training in pulmonary medicine and critical care medicine.

=== Pediatric pulmonologist ===
In the United States, pediatric pulmonologists are physicians who, after receiving a medical degree (MD, DO, MBBS, MBBCh, etc.), complete residency training in pediatrics, followed by at least three additional years of subspeciality fellowship training in pulmonology. Pediatric pulmonologists treat diseases of the airways, lungs, respiratory mechanics and aerodigestive system.

== Scientific research ==
Pulmonologists are involved in both clinical and basic research of the respiratory system, ranging from the anatomy of the respiratory epithelium to the most effective treatment of pulmonary hypertension. Scientific research also takes place to look for causes and possible treatment in diseases such as pulmonary tuberculosis and lung cancer.
