= Pleural friction rub =

- Differential diagnosis: pneumonia, pulmonary embolism

A pleural friction rub, or simply pleural rub, is an audible medical sign present in some patients with pleurisy and other conditions affecting the chest cavity. It is noted by listening to the internal sounds of the body, usually using a stethoscope on the lungs.

Pleural friction rubs are the squeaking or grating sounds of the pleural linings rubbing together and can be described as the sound made by treading on fresh snow. They occur where the pleural layers are inflamed and have lost their lubrication. Pleural rubs are common in pneumonia, pulmonary embolism, and pleurisy (pleuritis). Because these sounds occur whenever the patient's chest wall moves, they appear on inspiration and expiration.

== See also ==
- Pericardial friction rub
