= Auscultation =

Listening to the internal sounds of the body, usually using a stethoscope

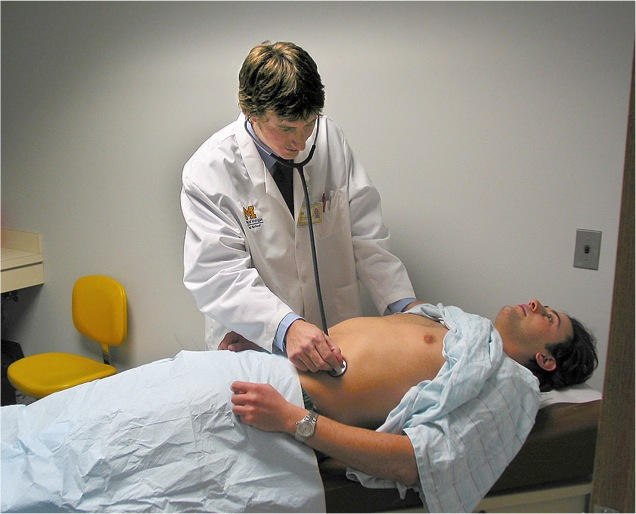
- A doctor auscultating a patient's abdomen
- MeSH: D001314
- MedlinePlus: 002226

Auscultation (based on the Latin verb auscultare "to listen") is listening to the internal sounds of the body, usually using a stethoscope. Auscultation is performed for the purposes of examining the circulatory and respiratory systems (heart and breath sounds), as well as the alimentary canal.

The term was introduced by René Laennec. The act of listening to body sounds for diagnostic purposes has its origin further back in history, possibly as early as Ancient Egypt. Auscultation and palpation go together in physical examination and are alike in that both have ancient roots, both require skill, and both are still important today. Laënnec's contributions were refining the procedure, linking sounds with specific pathological changes in the chest, and inventing a suitable instrument (the stethoscope) to mediate between the patient's body and the clinician's ear.

Auscultation is a skill that requires substantial clinical experience, a fine stethoscope and good listening skills. Health professionals (doctors, nurses, etc.) listen to three main organs and organ systems during auscultation: the heart, the lungs, and the gastrointestinal system. When auscultating the heart, doctors listen for abnormal sounds, including heart murmurs, gallops, and other extra sounds coinciding with heartbeats. Heart rate is also noted. When listening to lungs, breath sounds such as wheezes, crepitations and crackles are identified. The gastrointestinal system is auscultated to note the presence of bowel sounds.

Electronic stethoscopes can be recording devices, and can provide noise reduction and signal enhancement. This is helpful for purposes of telemedicine (remote diagnosis) and teaching. This opened the field to computer-aided auscultation. Ultrasonography (US) inherently provides capability for computer-aided auscultation, and portable US, especially portable echocardiography, replaces some stethoscope auscultation (especially in cardiology), although not nearly all of it (stethoscopes are still essential in basic checkups, listening to bowel sounds, and other primary care contexts).

== Auscultogram ==
The sounds of auscultation can be depicted using symbols to produce an auscultogram. It is used in cardiology training.

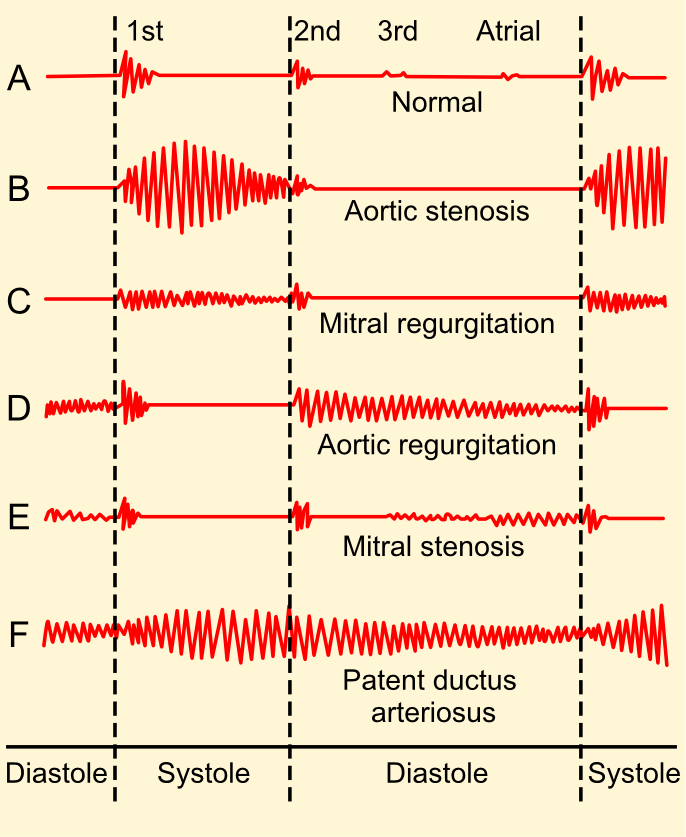
Phonocardiograms (also known as auscultograms) of common heart murmurs.

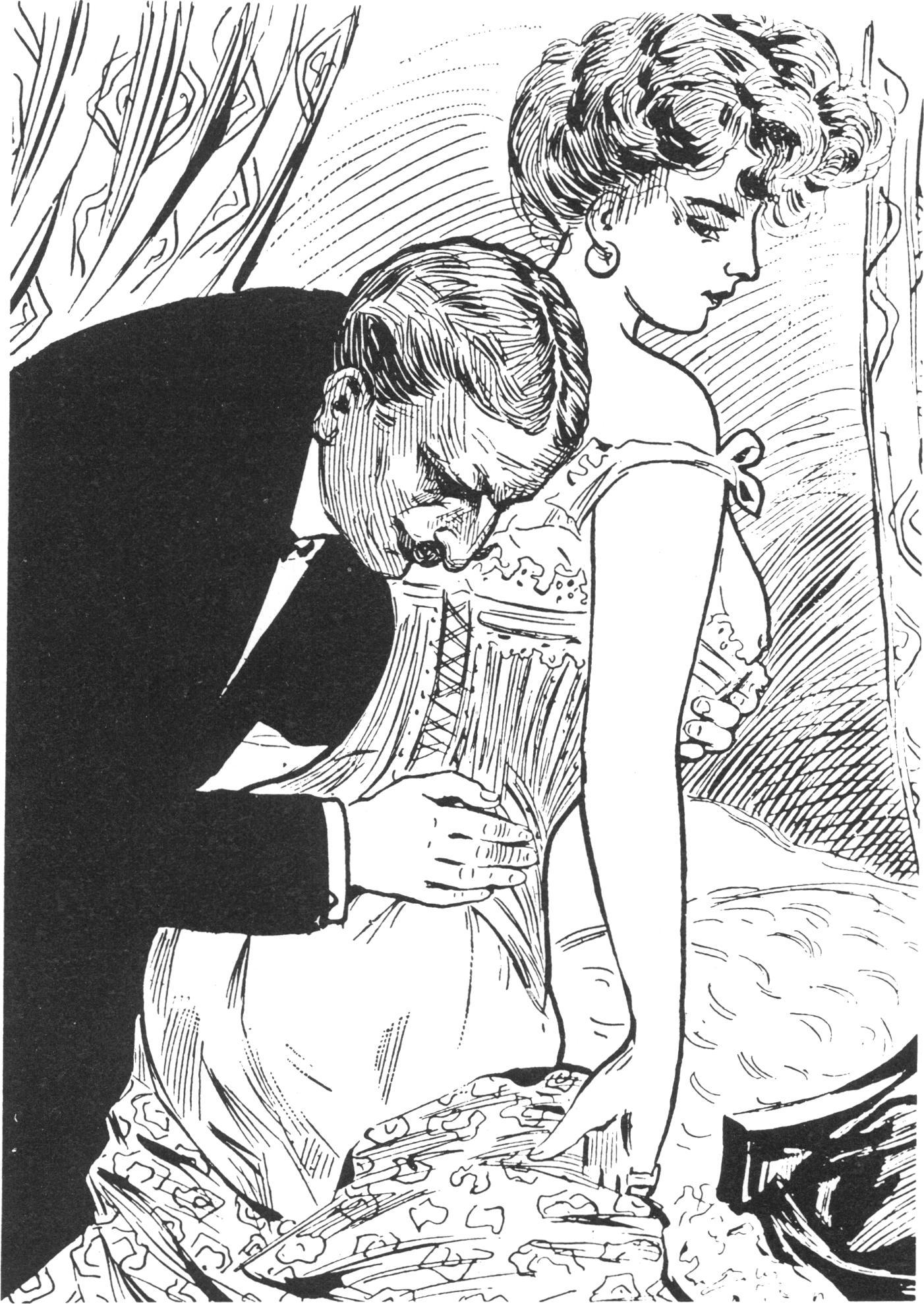
Illustration from 1906 depicting a physician who has placed a Laennec wooden stethoscope between his left ear and the corseted patient's back to ausculate.

== Mediate and immediate auscultation ==
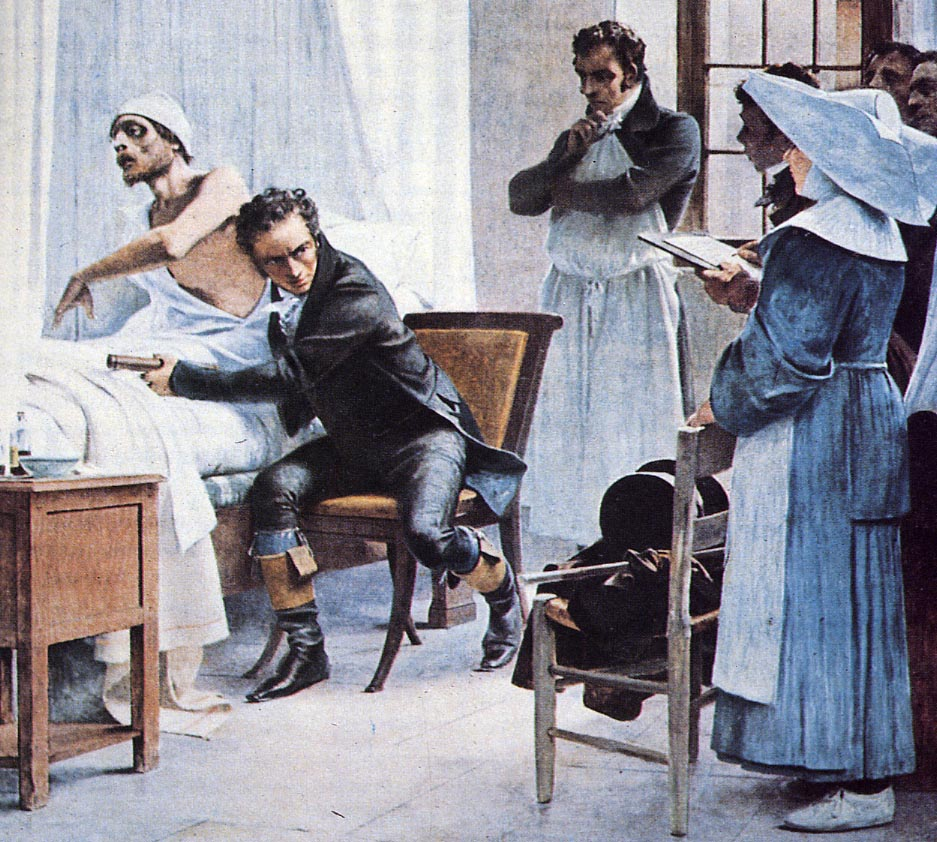
Laennec auscultates a patient before his students.

Mediate auscultation is an antiquated medical term for listening (auscultation) to the internal sounds of the body using an instrument (mediate), usually a stethoscope. It is opposed to immediate auscultation, directly placing the ear on the body.

== Doppler auscultation ==
It was demonstrated in the 2000s that Doppler auscultation using a handheld ultrasound transducer enables the auscultation of valvular movements and blood flow sounds that are undetected during cardiac examination with a stethoscope. The Doppler auscultation presented a sensitivity of 84% for the detection of aortic regurgitations, while classic stethoscope auscultation presented a sensitivity of 58%. Moreover, Doppler auscultation was superior in the detection of impaired ventricular relaxation. Since the physics of Doppler auscultation and classic auscultation are different, it has been suggested that both methods could complement each other.

== See also ==
- Breath sounds
- Heart sounds
- Intestinal sound
- Palpation, the practice of examining a patient through the use of hands
- Percussion (medicine)
- Pericardial friction rub
- Triangle of auscultation
