= Austin Flint I =

American physician (1812–1886)

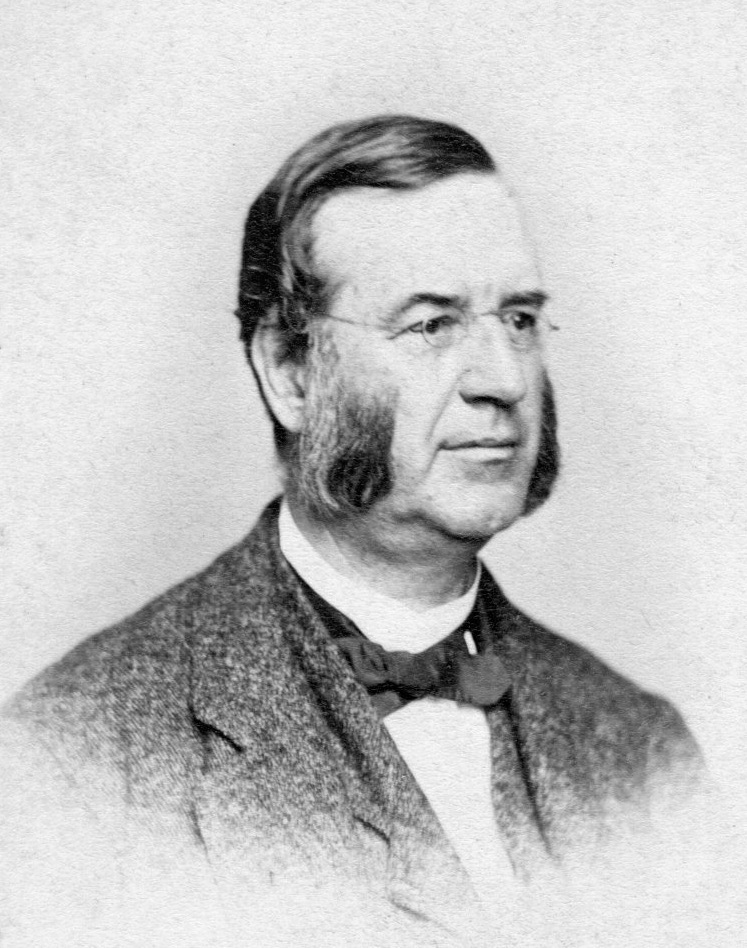
- Austin Flint I
- Born: 20 October 1812; Petersham, Massachusetts
- Died: 13 March 1886 (aged 73); Manhattan, New York City
- Education: Harvard University
- Occupation: Medical doctor
- Known for: Austin Flint murmur Heart disease
- Children: Austin Flint II
- Parent(s): Joseph Henshaw Flint (1786–1846); Hannah Willard Reed (1787–1821)

Austin Flint I (October 20, 1812 – March 13, 1886) was an American medical doctor. He was a founder of Buffalo Medical College, precursor to the State University of New York at Buffalo. He served as president of the American Medical Association.

== Biography ==
Flint was born at Petersham, Massachusetts, on October 20, 1812, to Joseph Henshaw Flint (1786–1846) and Hannah Willard Reed. He was educated at Amherst and Harvard and graduated from the latter in 1833.

After practicing in Boston, Massachusetts, and Northampton, Massachusetts, he moved to Buffalo, New York, in 1836. He was appointed professor of the institutes and practices of medicine at Rush Medical College in Chicago, Illinois; resigned after one year, in 1846, and established the Buffalo Medical Journal. With Doctors White and Frank Hastings Hamilton he founded the Buffalo Medical College in 1847, where he was professor of the principles and practice of medicine for six years. He was afterward professor of the theory and practice of medicine at the University of Louisville, Kentucky, from 1852 to 1856. He was then called to the chair of pathology and clinical medicine at Buffalo. From 1858 to 1861, he was professor of clinical medicine in the School of Medicine at New Orleans. In 1859 he moved to New York and in 1861 was appointed visiting physician to Bellevue Hospital; from 1861 to his death, in 1886, he was professor of the principles and practice of medicine in Bellevue Hospital Medical College (consolidated with the medical department of New York University in 1898), and from 1861 to 1868 he was professor of pathology and practical medicine in Long Island College Hospital.

He was president of the New York Academy of Medicine from 1872 to 1885 and president of the American Medical Association in 1884. He was elected as a member of the American Philosophical Society in 1880.

He died on March 13, 1886, in Manhattan, New York City. His funeral was held at Christ Church United Methodist at the corner of Fifth Avenue and 35th Street in Manhattan. His body was on display at his home on 418 Fifth Avenue.

== Publications ==
His published works include:

- The reciprocal duties and obligations of the medical profession and the public. (1844)
- Clinical reports on continued fever based on analyses of one hundred and sixty-four cases. (1852)
- Clinical report on chronic pleurisy: based on an analysis of forty-seven cases. (1853)
- On variations of pitch in percussion and respiratory sounds, and their application to physical diagnosis. (1852)
- Clinical report on dysentery: based on an analysis of forty-nine cases with remarks on the causation, pathology and management of the disease. (1853)
- Clinical Reports on Continued Fever Based on Analyses of One Hundred and Sixty-Four Cases. (1855)
- Physical Exploration in the Diagnosis of Diseases of the Respiratory Organs. (1856; revised second edition, 1868)
- Diseases of the Heart (1859; second edition, 1870)
- Experimental researches into a new excretory function of the liver. (1862)
- Principles and Practice of Medicine (1866; revised fifth edition, 1884)
- Medical Essays on Conservative Medicine and Kindred Topics (1874)
- Clinical Medicine (1879)
- On Phthisis (1883)
- Manual of Auscultation and Percussion (revised third edition, 1883)
- Medicine of the future (1886)

== See also ==
- Flint's murmur a loud presystolic murmur at the apex in aortic regurgitation. From Dorland's Medical Dictionary (1938)
