= Frank Hastings Hamilton =

Union United States Army officer and surgeon

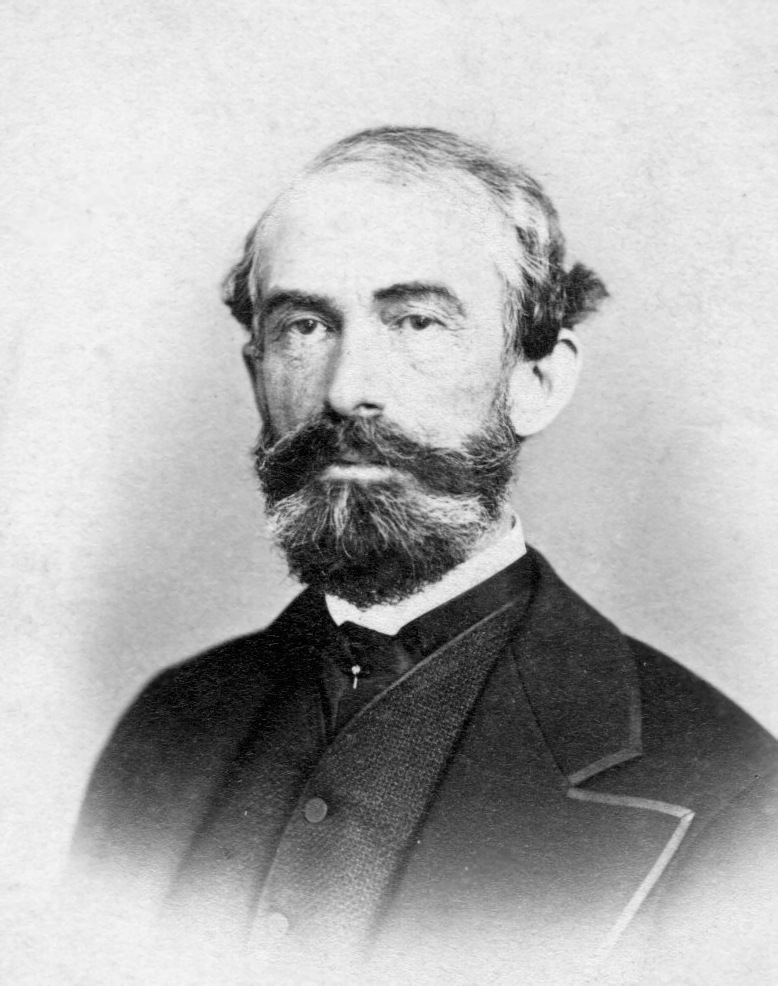

Dr. Frank Hastings Hamilton (September 13, 1813 in Wilmington, Vermont – August 11, 1886 in New York City, New York) was a surgeon.

== Early life and education ==
At the age of 14 Frank Hastings Hamilton was accepted into the sophomore class of Union College where he graduated with a Bachelor of Arts degree in 1830.

After graduation he began his three-year medical apprenticeship under Dr. John G. Morgan, the medical doctor at the New York State Prison of Auburn. Under Dr. Morgan's tutelage he studied anatomy and used his innate artistic talents to create oil paintings of nearly every part of the human body. He attended lectures at Fairfield and Western College of Physicians and Surgeons in New York. He received his license to practice medicine in 1833 and received the degree of Medical Doctor from the University of Pennsylvania in 1835. Among the many positions of honor and trust which he held was the presidency of the New York Society of Medical Jurisprudence.

== Founder of University of Buffalo Jacobs School of Medicine ==
Hamilton co-founded the medical department of the University of Buffalo in 1846 and is listed as a "Founder" on the university website along with James Platt White and Austin Flint I. He served as their first dean and taught surgery for 14 years. Frank Hastings Hamilton tried the first successful skin graft at the University of Buffalo in 1854 at Sisters Hospital. On April 27, 1853 he gave an address to the graduates in medicine at the University of Buffalo. Frank Hastings Hamilton, is memorialized on the University website as "a preeminent surgeon who introduced the use of ether as an anesthetic in the Niagara Frontier and who served as the school’s first dean and chair of surgery." His interest in the musculoskeletal system, along with his interest in trauma and fractures, qualify him as the “father of orthopedic surgery” at UB. The school has a club named after him called the Frank Hastings Hamilton Surgical Society. Hamilton Road, at the University of Buffalo campus, was named in honor of Frank Hastings Hamilton.

== Bellevue Hospital & Medical College ==
In 1861, the Bellevue Hospital Medical College, the first medical college in New York with connections to a hospital, was founded by Valentine Mott, Lewis Sayre, Frank Hamilton, and Stephen Smith. In the spring of 1861. After teaching in various colleges, in 1861 he became a Professor of Surgery, pioneer in orthopedics, military surgery, and military hygiene; at Bellevue Hospital Medical College along with the following esteemed physicians as the faculty: Frank Hastings Hamilton, Stephen Smith, James R. Wood, Alexander B. Mott, Lewis A. Sayre, Isaac E. Taylor, Fordyce Barker, George T. Elliot, Jr., Benjamin W. McCready, J.W. S. Gouley, Austin Flint, Austin Flint, Jr., and Robert O. Doremus. After returning from his service in the Civil War, was Professor of Surgery until he resigned in 1875. Among Frank Hastings Hamilton's noteworthy students was, Dr. Charles Leale, who the first medical professional to reach President Abraham Lincoln after he had been shot in the back of the head.

== Civil War military service (1861–1864) ==
At the beginning of the civil war he accompanied the 31st New York regiment to the front, and had charge of the general field hospital in Centreville during the First Battle of Bull Run. On July 26, 1861 Dr. Frank Hastings Hamilton wrote a letter "special to the American Medical Times" about what he saw and did in the First Battle of Bull Run. In July, 1861, he was made brigade surgeon, and later medical director, and in 1862 organized the United States general hospital in Central park, New York. On February 11, 1863, President Abraham Lincoln appointed Frank H. Hamilton as “Medical Inspector with the rank of Lieutenant Colonel in the service of the United States.” This appointment was signed at the conclusion by President Lincoln, and countersigned by Secretary of War Edwin M. Stanton, with Lorenzo Thomas signing above as adjutant general. Dr. Hamilton was given the rank of lieutenant-colonel, and was appointed as the first Chair of Military Medicine in the United States.

== Teaching Career & Connection to the Assassination of Abraham Lincoln ==
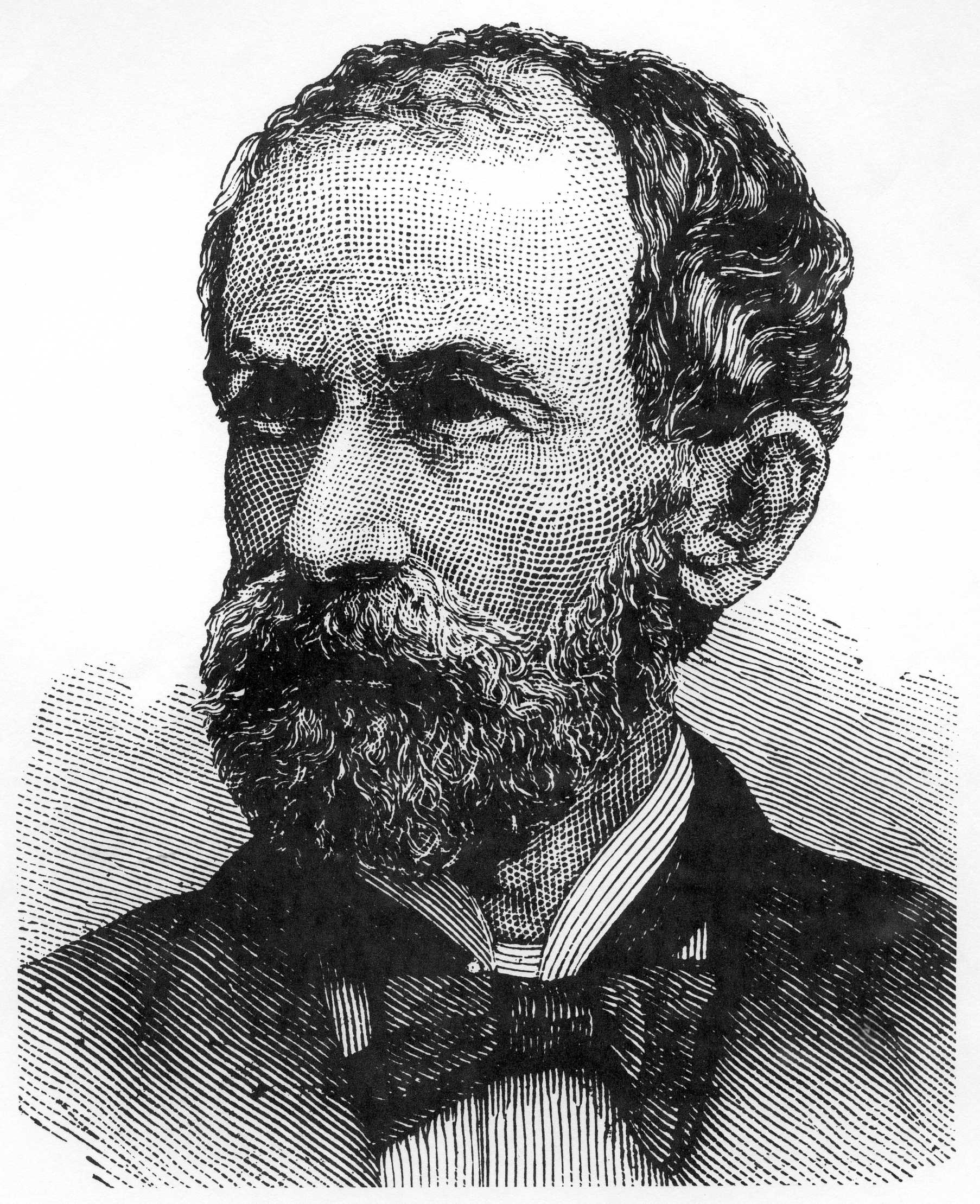
Dr. Frank Hamilton in Harper's Weekly in 1881

During the American Civil War, Hamilton served as a surgeon in the Union Army, where he gained extensive experience in the treatment of battlefield injuries, particularly gunshot wounds and fractures. After the war, he continued his medical career as a professor of surgery at Bellevue Hospital Medical College in New York City, where he trained a generation of physicians in surgical techniques, emergency trauma care, and orthopedic surgery.

One of Hamilton’s notable students was Charles Augustus Leale, who graduated from Bellevue in March 1865. Immediately after graduation, Leale was commissioned as an assistant surgeon in the United States Army and assigned to Armory Square Hospital in Washington, D.C. On the evening of April 14, 1865, Leale attended a performance of Our American Cousin at Ford’s Theatre, where President Abraham Lincoln was present. When John Wilkes Booth shot the President at approximately 10:15 p.m., Leale pushed his way to the Presidential box and was the first physician to reach Lincoln.

Drawing upon the skills and diagnostic methods he had learned from Hamilton—particularly in the treatment of penetrating head injuries—Leale cleared a clot from Lincoln’s wound, temporarily restoring breathing, and remained at his side until Lincoln’s death at 7:22 a.m. on April 15, 1865. Leale later credited his training under Hamilton at Bellevue as critical to his ability to respond effectively to that historic emergency.

== Published works ==
Hamilton was a prolific medical writer whose works ranged from surgical textbooks to military medicine manuals, specialized case studies, and public addresses. His publications include:

- Discourse on the Importance of a General Diffusion of Knowledge of Anatomy, Physiology, and Hygiene (1838), delivered to the Auburn Female Seminary.
- Introductory Lecture Before the Surgical Class of Geneva Medical College (1840).
- Address to the Graduates in Medicine at the University of Buffalo (1853).
- Elkoplasty: or, Anaplasty Applied to the Treatment of Old Ulcers, and in Cases of Ununited Fractures (1854), on reconstructive surgical techniques.
- Eulogy on the Life and Character of Theodric Romeyn Beck, M.D., LL.D. (1856), delivered to the Medical Society of the State of New York.
- A Practical Treatise on Military Surgery (1861), a guide for the treatment of battlefield injuries during the American Civil War.
- A Practical Treatise on Fractures and Dislocations (1860; multiple later editions), a widely used orthopedic reference.
- A Treatise on Military Surgery and Hygiene (c.1865), expanding on his earlier military medicine work.
- The Principles and Practice of Surgery (1874), a comprehensive surgical textbook.
- Fracture of the Patella: A Study of One Hundred and Twenty-seven Cases (1880), a clinical study of kneecap fractures.
- Conversations between Drs. Warren and Putnam on the Subject of Medical Ethics (1884).

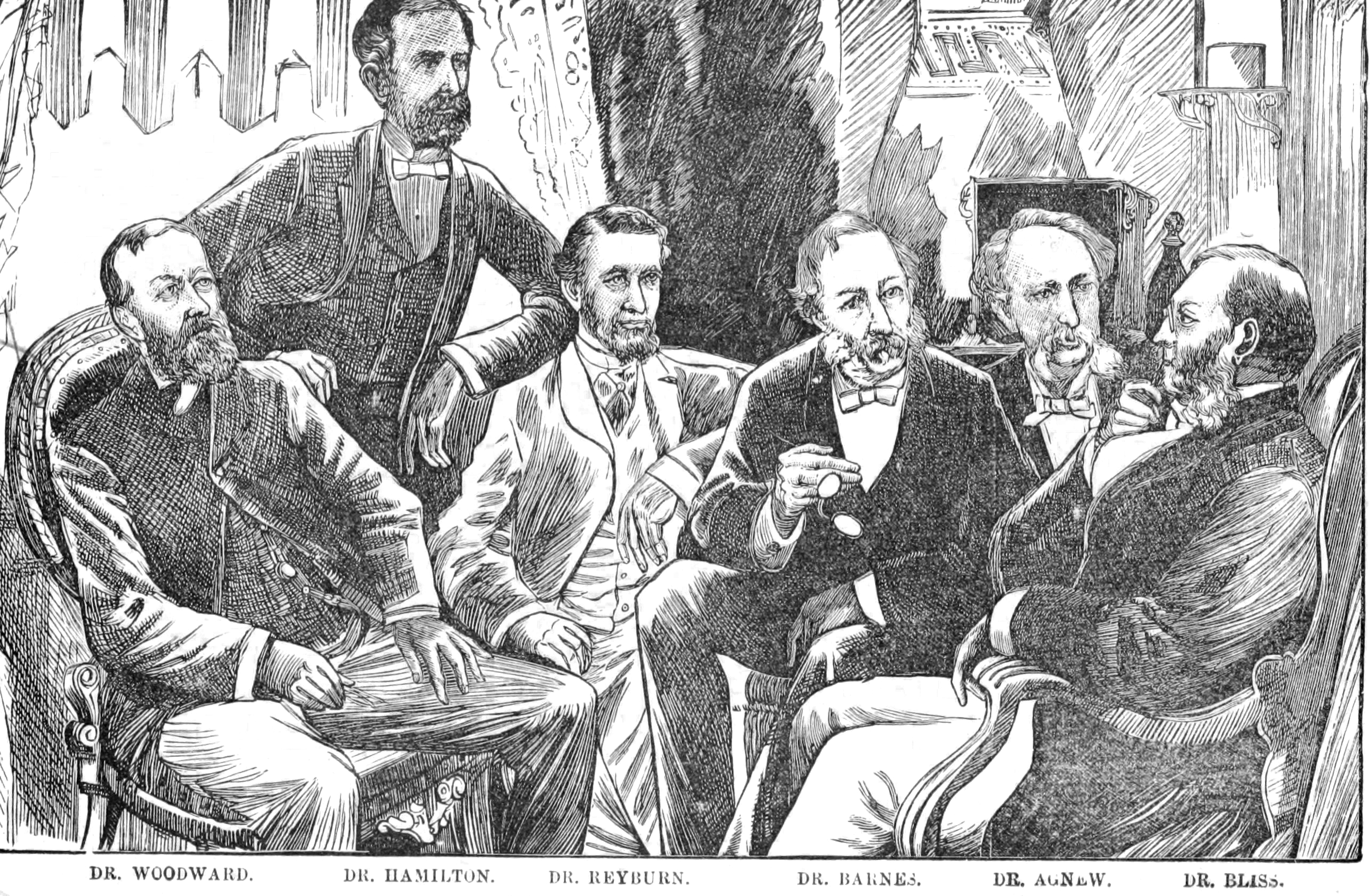
Doctors discuss Garfield's wounds.

Hamilton’s works, particularly his treatises on fractures and military surgery, were standard references for decades and contributed significantly to the professionalization of American surgery in the mid-19th century.

== Terms ==
- Hamilton's bandage — a compound bandage for the lower jaw, composed of a leather string with straps of linen webbing.
- Hamilton's pseudophlegmon — a circumscribed swelling which may become red and indurated, but never suppurates.
- Hamilton's test — When the shoulder joint is luxated, a rule or straight rod applied to the humerus can be made to touch the outer condyle and the acromion at the same time.

Dorland's Medical Dictionary (1938)

== Death and burial ==
Dr. Frank Hastings Hamilton died on 11-Aug-1886 at 43 West 32nd Street, New York City, New York County, New York, at age 74; from Fibroid Phthisis-chronic pulmonary disease with hemorage. He was buried at Sleepy Hollow Cemetery in Sleepy Hollow, New York. His obituary was published in The New England Journal of Medicine on August 26, 1886, in the British Medical Journal on August 28, 1886, Buffalo Medical and Surgical Journal on September 26, 1886, The American Practitioner and News, Boston Medical and Surgical Journal, Atlanta Medical and Surgical Journal and New York Medical Journal.

== Family ==
Hamilton was the great-grandfather of Frank H. Davis, who served as Vermont State Treasurer from 1969 to 1975.

Dr. Frank Hastings Hamilton was the son of Calvin Ulysses Hamilton and Lucinda (Hastings) Hamilton. Calvin Ulysses Hamilton was a farmer and owned a stagecoach line that ran across the Green Mountains between Bennington, Vermont and Brattleboro, Vermont.

Through his mother, Lucinda (Hastings) Hamilton, Dr. Frank Hastings Hamilton is a descendant of Thomas Hastings who came from the East Anglia region of England to the Massachusetts Bay Colony in 1634.

Dr. Frank Hastings Hamilton & Mary Van Arsdale had a son, Colonel Theodore B. Hamilton (1836-1893), who distinguished himself in battle during the American Civil War. Colonel Theodore B. Hamilton married Helen Margaret Foote, daughter of esteemed diplomat and journalist Thomas Moses Foote, and descendant of Nathaniel Foote "The Settler", and Margaret St. John, circa 1872. Colonel Theodore B. Hamilton and Helen Margaret Foote had three children:

- Thomas F. Hamilton b. circa 12 Nov 1872, d. 16 Aug 1917
- Frank H. Hamilton b. 18 Oct 1874, d. 29 Dec 1906
- Helen Margaret Hamilton b. 14 Feb 1876, d. 1 May 1961
