= Infectious Disease Clinics of North America =

- Discipline: Infectious diseases
- Language: English

Publication details
- History: 1987–present
- Publisher: Elsevier
- Impact factor: 4.4 (2022)

Standard abbreviations
- ISO 4: Infect. Dis. Clin. N. Am.

Indexing
- CODEN: IDCAE
- ISSN: 0891-5520 (print); 1557-9824 (web)
- LCCN: 87644114
- OCLC no.: 14781687

Links
- Journal homepage; Online archive

Infectious Disease Clinics of North America is a medical journal that covers the latest trends in the clinical diagnosis and management of patients with infectious diseases. The journal was established in 1987 and was first published by the Philadelphia-based company W.B. Saunders Co. on a quarterly basis. It has been published by Elsevier since 2005.

== Abstracting and indexing ==
The journal is abstracted and indexed in:

- Embase
- PubMed/Medline
- CINAHL
- Current Contents - Clinical Medicine
- Web of Science
- Science Citation Index
- Medical Documentation Service
- Research Alert

According to the Journal Citation Reports, the journal has a 2022 impact factor of 4.4.
