= Alfred Cohn =

Alfred Cohn may refer to:

- Alfred A. Cohn (1880–1951), American author, journalist and newspaper editor, and screenwriter
- Alfred E. Cohn (1879–1957), American physician and author
