= George Frederic Still =

English paediatrician and author

Sir Frederic Still
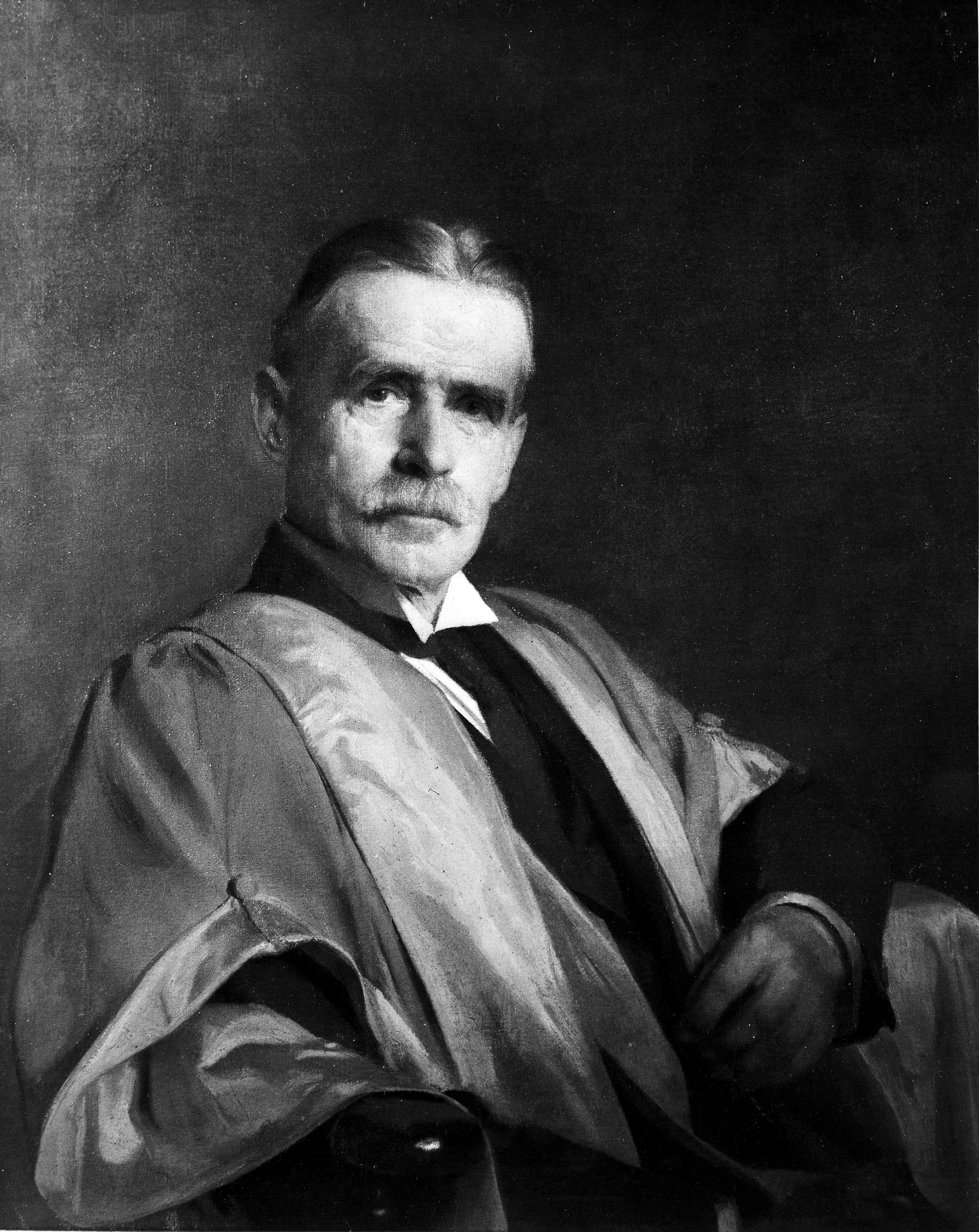
- Born: George Frederic Still; 27 February 1868
- Died: 28 June 1941 (aged 73)
- Known for: Still's disease Still's murmur
- Scientific career
- Fields: Paediatrics

Sir George Frederic Still, KCVO (27 February 1868 – 28 June 1941) was an English paediatrician who helped to establish paediatrics as a new discipline. He was the author of five medical textbooks, and publisher of hundreds of papers. Still first described a form of juvenile idiopathic arthritis as well as the common functional Still's murmur, both of which bear his name. He was also one of the first to describe ADHD. He is frequently referred to as the "Father of British Paediatrics".

== Early life ==
George Still was born on 27 February 1868 in Highbury, London. He was the only boy of eight children born to George Still and Eliza Still (née Andrew). To distinguish him from his father, the junior Still was known by his middle name Frederic.

Still was awarded a scholarship to attend the Merchant Taylors' School, a boys public school in London. He was from a working-class family who would otherwise have not been able to afford the fees. He was further awarded a scholarship to attend Gonville and Caius College, Cambridge. He matriculated in 1885 and received first-class honours in the Classical Tripos and Winchester Prizeman award during his college years. He graduated with a first class Bachelor of Arts (BA) degree in 1888, and then entered King's College London School of Medicine, graduating in 1893.

== Background ==
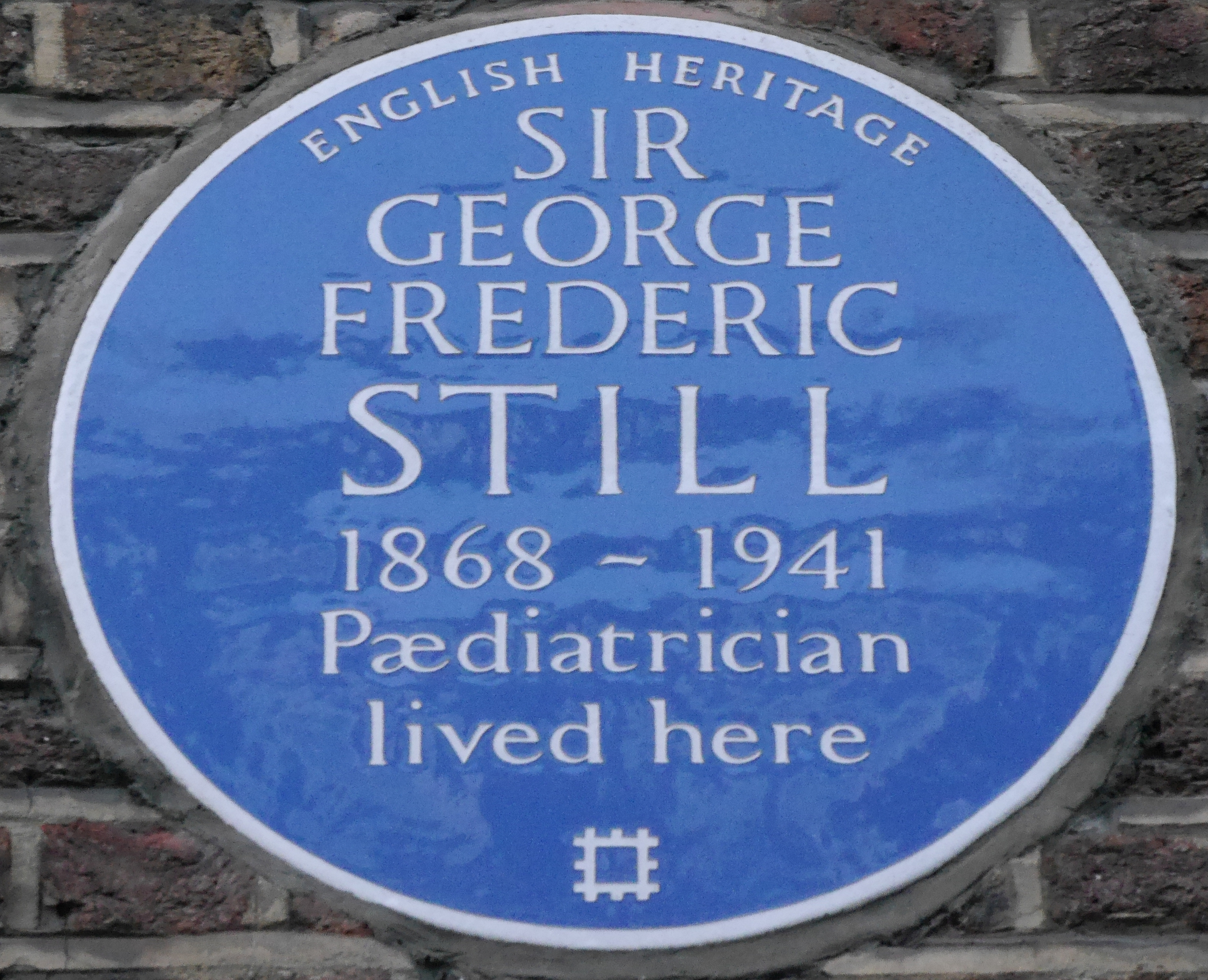
Blue plaque, 28 Queen Anne Street, London

In 1897, Still published his doctoral thesis describing a form of childhood febrile arthritis today known as Still's disease. During the Goulstonian Lectures on the topic of "On Some Abnormal Physical Conditions in Children", Still talks about "moral control" and his lecture is based on the same symptoms that is known as ADHD now. Still's descriptions are very similar to those of ADHD, but "most of the symptoms listed by Still and described in his cases do not refer to ADHD." Lange and colleagues still state how he was very influential regarding what is now ADHD, and we must give Still credit for contributing to these topics discussed today. Other medical terms named after him include Still's murmur and Still's rash.

During most of his adult life, Still's avocation was reading works from antiquity in their original languages. He studied the "classics" during his undergraduate training which led him to be fluent in Greek, Latin, Hebrew and Arabic. His choice of profession, however, was medicine and he devoted his life to paediatrics, writing prolifically about childhood diseases and serving as Secretary of the Children's Clinical Club. Still worked at Guy's Hospital and the Hospital of Sick Children alongside James Goodhard who was his mentor. His life was dedicated to improving afflicted children's chance at survival, and particularly patients at Great Ormond Street Hospital. He was knighted upon retiring in 1937.

== Accomplishments/Publications ==
- Granted Physician to the royal household and Knight Commander of the Victorian Order by King George VI.
- Established the department for the diseases of childhood at Guy's Hospital in 1893.
- Interested in the ability to prevent disability in adults by treating those in kids.
- Taught the first class in the United Kingdom about children's diseases at King's College.
- Invited to give Goulstonian lecture in 1902, later the Lumleian lecture (1918), and the Fitzpatrick Lectures (1928 & 1929).
- Disease now known as Still's was named after Still and is the disease he described in his article "Form of Chronic Joint Disease in Children."
- One of his famous books is titled "Common Disorders and Diseases of Childhood." This book includes topics on breast-feeding, Rickets, intestinal worms, Jaundice in children, Pneumonia, and many more other diseases where he specifically writes about different illnesses.
- Still was awarded the Dawson Williams Prize in 1934.
- He was made an honorary fellow of the Royal Society of Medicine in 1937.

These awards boosted his credentials and made him a well-respected pediatrician.

== Organisations ==
Still was involved in many organisations that helped promote his work. He was the Chairman of the Medical Committee at King's, a part of the Society for Waifs and Strays, and the National Association for the Prevention of Infant Mortality for twenty years. He also helped give care to families who did not have the funds for treatments. Still hosted a meeting at his home with other paediatric physicians, and was the president of the British Pediatric Association.

== Impact ==
Today, George Frederic Still's ideas are still being applied and accepted worldwide. Some examples of the disorders that he wrote about are Rickets, Tuberculosis, Stills disease, disorder of speech, ADHD, and many more. Thanks to Still, psychologists and physicians have now been able to expand research and be able to produce with treatment plans as well as expand his knowledge.

== Death ==
Frederic Still died in Salisbury at the age of 73 on 28 June 1941.
