= Continuous murmurs =

Type of heart murmur

Auscultogram from normal and abnormal heart sounds

Heart murmurs are most frequently organized by timing, into systolic heart murmurs and diastolic heart murmurs. However, continuous murmurs can not be directly placed into either category.

These murmurs are due to blood flow from a high pressure chamber or vessel to a lower pressure system.

- Patent ductus arteriosus . Patent ductus arteriosus (PDA) is an abnormal connection between the aorta and the pulmonary artery, which normally should be closed in infancy. Since aortic pressure is higher than pulmonary pressure, a continuous murmur occurs. This murmur is often described as a machinery murmur, or Gibson's murmur. This is named for George Alexander Gibson, who characterised it in 1898.
- Aortopulmonary window.
- Shunts. Usually a left to right shunt through a small atrial septal defect in the presence of mitral valve obstruction.
