= Paeff =

Paeff is both a middle name and surname. Notable people with the name include:

- Reba Paeff Mirsky (1902–1966), American musician
- Bashka Paeff (1889–1979), American sculptor
