= Cabot–Locke murmur =

- Differential diagnosis: severe anemia

A Cabot–Locke murmur is an early diastolic heart murmur, occasionally heard in severe untreated anemia, without heart valve abnormalities. It is detected infrequently, is best heard at the left sternal border, and sounds similar to aortic insufficiency, although it is without decrescendo. Its location, timing, association with severe anemia, and resolution upon correction of anemia, are consistent mechanistically with a functional murmur arising from high volume flow dynamics in the left main coronary artery, which has almost entirely diastolic flow.

It is named for Richard Clarke Cabot and his colleague, Locke. They reported on a series of three patients who had been clinically diagnosed with heart valve disease, but who had normal valvular anatomy at subsequent autopsy.
