= Alfred Mirsky =

American molecular biologist

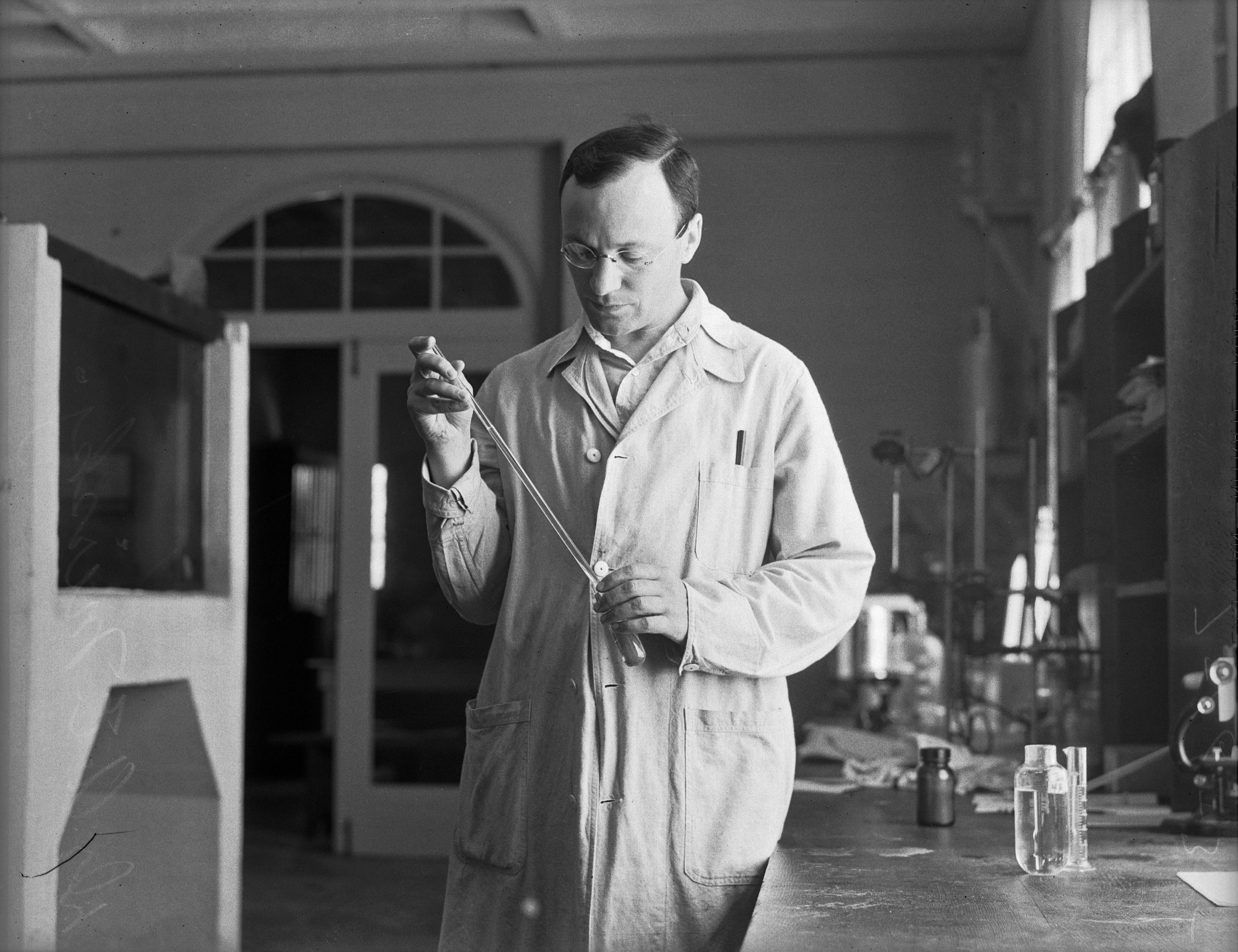
- Mirsky in 1935
- Born: Alfred Ezra Mirsky; October 17, 1900; New York
- Died: June 10, 1974 (aged 73); New York
- Education: Harvard University (BA); Columbia University; University of Cambridge (PhD)
- Known for: Proving the concept of DNA as the hereditary material
- Spouse(s): Reba Paeff (d. 1966), Sonia Wohl (m. 1967)
- Children: 2 (including Jonathan Mirsky)
- Scientific career
- Fields: Molecular biology
- Institutions: Rockefeller University, California Institute of Technology
- Doctoral advisor: Lawrence J. Henderson
- Other academic advisors: Alfred E. Cohn, Linus Pauling

Alfred Ezra Mirsky (October 17, 1900, New York – June 19, 1974, New York) was an American pioneer in molecular biology.

== Life and career ==
Mirsky graduated from Harvard College in 1922, after which he studied for two years at the Columbia University College of Physicians and Surgeons until 1924 when he moved to the University of Cambridge on a US National Research Council fellowship for the academic year 1924–1925. He received his PhD from Cambridge in 1926, with a dissertation under Lawrence J. Henderson on the hemoglobin molecule, completing work begun under Joseph Barcroft.

On May 25, 1926 Mirsky married Reba Paeff, who went on to become a renowned children's author; they had a daughter, Reba Goodman and a son, Jonathan Mirsky. Alfred Mirsky’s sister, Jeannette Mirsky, was a freelance historian.

In 1927 Mirsky was appointed Lab Assistant to Alfred E. Cohn at the then Rockefeller Institute for Medical Research, beginning his association with Rockefeller University. During a sabbatical year at the California Institute of Technology, Mirsky published a paper with Linus Pauling on the general theory of protein structure, suggesting that the structure of proteins are coiled in a specific configuration that accounts for the function in the body, and that the protein is denatured when that configuration is lost by breaking the hydrogen bonds that stabilize the structure.

One of Mirsky's more notorious contributions while at the Rockefeller Institute was his attempt to discredit Oswald Avery. Avery had correctly shown that DNA was likely the agent of heredity. However, Mirsky went to great lengths to block Avery's discovery because of doubts that DNA was the sole genetic material. It is said he even urged the Karolinska Institute in Sweden not to award Avery the Nobel Prize. Eventually Mirsky's efforts were successful. Avery did not win the prize, despite Erwin Chargaff assertion that Avery's work was worth two Nobel Prizes.

Mirsky became an official Member of the Rockefeller Institute in 1948, and in 1950 was internationally congratulated for the "grand discovery" of DNA constancy, which proved the concept of DNA as the hereditary material. He served as an editor of The Journal of General Physiology in 1951–1961.

Mirsky was made Professor in 1954 when the Institute became Rockefeller University. He was also elected to the United States National Academy of Sciences in the same year. Mirsky was highly involved in university affairs, and in 1959 he initiated a series of lectures for high school students, now named the Alfred E. Mirsky Holiday Lecture on Science in his honour.

In 1962 Mirsky chose a new lab assistant from a pool of candidates, in choosing a woman, Ellie Donoghue, he set a precedent by making her the first female lab assistant in the Institute's history, the very same position which he first held upon his initial association with Rockefeller Institute. Mirsky proceeded to entrust Ms. Donoghue with assistance in his research and the running of his laboratory, setting an early precedent for the advancement of women in the labs at Rockefeller University.

Mirsky was elected to the American Philosophical Society in 1964 and the American Academy of Arts and Sciences in 1966.

Following retirement from his laboratory in an official capacity in 1964, he served as librarian of the Rockefeller University from 1965 until 1972, all the while being allowed to maintain his laboratory at the university for his personal research. He continued to make groundbreaking contributions to the study of cell nuclei in rodents and bovines in direct parallels to the structure of cell nuclei in humans.

After his wife, Reba Paeff Mirsky, died in 1966 he donated her valuable jewelry collection, save for a few pieces distributed to family and close friends, to the university's collection. This collection of jewelry, acquired during their many trips around the world, is a part of the university's holdings to this day. He went on to marry fellow Rockefeller employee Sonia Wohl in 1967. Mirsky became professor emeritus in 1971, after forty-four years at the Rockefeller Institute and University.

Mirsky traveled widely and was quite knowledgeable in archaeology and art history; his priceless collection of art and historical objects was willed to the Rockefeller University upon his death in 1974 and remains in their permanent collection.

== Significant papers ==
- Anson ML and Mirsky AE. (1925) "On Some General Properties of Proteins, Journal of General Physiology", 9, 169–179.
- Anson ML and Mirsky AE. (1929) "Protein Coagulation and its Reversal: The Preparation of Completely Coagulated Hemoglobin", Journal of General Physiology, 13, 121–132.
- Mirsky AE and Anson ML. (1929) "Protein Coagulation and its Reversal: The Reversal of the Coagulation of Hemoglobin", Journal of General Physiology, 13, 133–143.
- Anson ML and Mirsky AE. (1930) "Protein Coagulation and its Reversal: The Preparation of Insoluble Globin, Soluble Globin and Heme", Journal of General Physiology, 13, 469–476.
- Mirsky AE and Anson ML. (1930) "Protein Coagulation and its Reversal: Improved Methods for the Reversal of the Coagulation of Hemoglobin", Journal of General Physiology, 13, 477–481.
- Mirsky AE and Pauling L. (1936) "On the Structure of Native, Denatured, and Coagulated Proteins", Proceedings of the National Academy of Sciences USA, 22, 439–447.
