= Alfred E. Cohn =

American physician and author

Alfred Einstein Cohn (1879–1957) was an American physician and author who worked at the Rockefeller Institute for Medical Research, where he was the director of the Laboratory for Heart Disease. He was one of the first people to use electrocardiograms in a clinical setting. He corresponded with several anti-Nazi organizations throughout World War, inquiring about their various actions. He died at his home, Iron Hill Farm, in New Milford, Connecticut in 1957.

== Biography ==
Alfred Cohn was born on April 16, 1879, in New York. His brother is Edwin Joseph Cohn. Alfred studied at Columbia University, where he got his A.B. in 1900, and then his M.D. the College of Physicians and Surgeons. He then went on to study in Austria, Germany, and England; where he, along with James Mackenzie, discovered the presystolic murmur. When the First World War broke out, he served in the Army Medical Reserve Corp, and then as Lieutenant colonel in the American Expeditionary Force, where he was a senior consultant on circulatory disease. In 1920 he took a job at the Rockefeller Institute for Medical Research, where he maintained an office even after retiring up until near the end of his life.

== Scientific work ==
Cohn worked extensively in cardiology. Around 1909, along with James Mackenzie, he discovered the presystolic murmur. Later, he worked with Dr. Thomas Lewis to set up the Einthoven string galvanometer. He worked with Alfred Ezra Mirsky. One of his main areas of study was the quantitation and description of the activities of the human heart. He made his first electrocardiogram at Mount Sinai Hospital (Manhattan).

== Humanistic work ==
After studying cardiology for a long time, Cohn took in interest in humanities, causing him to break with Mirsky.

=== The Alfred E. Cohn Papers ===
The Alfred E. Cohn Papers are a collection of correspondences between Cohn and several anti-Nazi groups. The correspondences mostly concerned Jewish life overseas and the rise of anti-semitism in Europe.
