= Diastolic heart murmur =

Aspect of heart function

Auscultogram from normal and abnormal heart sounds

Diastolic heart murmurs are heart murmurs heard during diastole, i.e. they start at or after S2 and end before or at S1. Many involve stenosis of the atrioventricular valves or regurgitation of the semilunar valves.

== Types ==
- Early diastolic murmurs start at the same time as S2 with the close of the semilunar (aortic & pulmonary) valves and typically end before S1. Common causes include aortic or pulmonary regurgitation and left anterior descending artery stenosis.
- Mid-diastolic murmurs start after S2 and end before S1. They are due to turbulent flow across the atrioventricular (mitral & tricuspid) valves during the rapid filling phase from mitral or tricuspid stenosis.
- Late diastolic (presystolic) murmurs start after S2 and extend up to S1 and have a crescendo configuration. They can be associated with AV valve narrowing. They include mitral stenosis, tricuspid stenosis, myxoma, and complete heart block.

== Individual murmurs ==
=== Early diastolic ===
Time	Condition	Description
Early diastolic	Aortic regurgitation	The murmur is low intensity, high-pitched, best heard over the left sternal border or over the right second intercostal space, especially if the patient leans forward and holds breath in full expiration. The radiation is typically toward the apex. The configuration is usually decrescendo and has a blowing character. The presence of this murmur is a good positive predictor for AR and the absence of this murmur strongly suggests the absence of AR. An Austin Flint murmur is usually associated with significant aortic regurgitation.
Early diastolic	Pulmonary regurgitation	Pulmonary regurgitation is most commonly due to pulmonary hypertension (Graham-Steell murmur). It is a high-pitched and blowing murmur with a decrescendo configuration. It may increase in intensity during inspiration and best heard over left second and third intercostal spaces. The murmur usually does not extend to S1.
Early diastolic	Left anterior descending artery stenosis	This murmur, also known as Dock's murmur, is similar to that of aortic regurgitation and is heard at the left second or third intercostal space. A Coronary artery bypass surgery can eliminate the murmur.
Early diastolic	Cabot–Locke murmur	This murmur sounds similar to aortic insufficiency, but does not have a decrescendo. It is often heard in untreated anemia, and is best heard at the left sternal border.

=== Mid-diastolic ===
Time	Condition	Description
Mid-diastolic	Mitral stenosis	This murmur has a rumbling character and is best heard with the bell of the stethoscope in the left ventricular impulse area with the patient in the lateral decubitus position. It usually starts with an opening snap. In general, the shorter the duration (S2 to Opening Snap), the more severe the mitral stenosis. However, this rule can be misleading in situations where the stenosis is so severe that the flow becomes reduced, or during high-output situations such as pregnancy where a less severe stenosis may still produce a strong murmur. In mitral stenosis, tapping apical impulse is present.
Mid-diastolic	Tricuspid stenosis	Best heard over the left sternal border with rumbling character and tricuspid opening snap with wide splitting S1. May increase in intensity with inspiration (Carvallo's sign). Tricuspid stenosis often occurs in association with mitral stenosis. Isolated TS are often associated with carcinoid disease and right atrial myxoma.
Mid-diastolic	Atrial myxoma	Atrial myxomas are benign tumors of the heart. Left myxomas are far more common than right myxomas and those may cause obstruction of the mitral valve producing a mid-diastolic murmur similar to that of mitral stenosis.
Mid-diastolic	Increased flow across the atrioventricular valve	This can also produce a mid-diastolic murmur, such as in severe mitral regurgitation where a large regurgitant volume in the left atrium can lead to "functional mitral stenosis."
Mid-diastolic	Austin Flint murmur	An apical diastolic rumbling murmur in patients with pure aortic regurgitation. This can be mistaken with the murmur in mitral stenosis because an Austin Flint murmur does not have an opening snap that is found in mitral stenosis.
Mid-diastolic	Carey-Coombs murmur	A mid-diastolic murmur over the left ventricular impulse due to mitral valvulitis from acute rheumatic fever.

=== Late diastolic ===
Time	Condition	Description
Late diastolic (presystolic)	Complete heart block	A short late diastolic murmur can occasionally be heard (Rytand's murmur).
