= Austin Flint murmur =

- Differential diagnosis: aortic regurgitation

In cardiology, an Austin Flint murmur is a low-pitched rumbling heart murmur which is best heard at the cardiac apex. It can be a mid-diastolic or presystolic murmur. It is associated with severe aortic regurgitation, although the role of this sign in clinical practice has been questioned.

== Mechanism ==
Echocardiography, conventional and colour flow Doppler ultrasound, and cine nuclear magnetic resonance (cine NMR) imaging suggest the murmur is the result of (aortic regurgitant) flow impingement on the inner surface of the heart, i.e. the endocardium.

=== Classical description ===
Classically, it is described as being the result of mitral valve leaflet displacement and turbulent mixing of anterograde mitral flow and retrograde aortic flow:

Displacement: The blood jets from the aortic regurgitation strike the anterior leaflet of the mitral valve, which often results in premature closure of the mitral leaflets. This can be mistaken for mitral stenosis.

Turbulence of the two columns of blood: Blood from left atrium to left ventricle and blood from aorta to left ventricle.

== Name ==
The Austin Flint murmur is named after the 19th century American physician, Austin Flint (1812–1886). He disapproved of associating any physical sign with the name of the original describer, and wrote, "So long as signs are determined from fancied analogies, and named from these or after the person who describes them, there cannot but be obscurity and confusion."
