= Austin Flint II =

American physician (1836–1915)

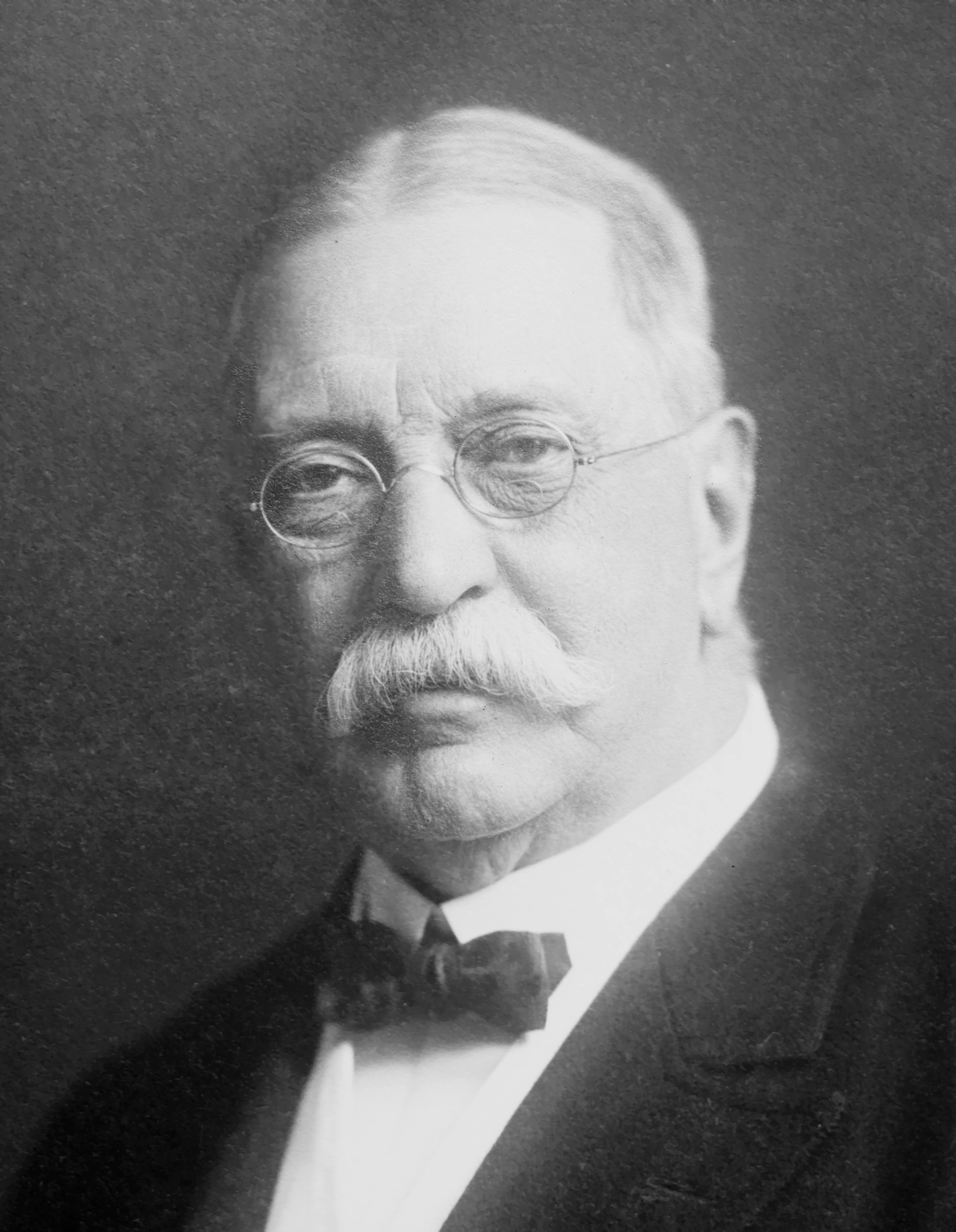
- Born: March 28, 1836; Northampton, Massachusetts, US
- Died: September 21, 1915 (aged 79); Manhattan, New York City, US
- Education: University of Louisville; Harvard Medical School; Jefferson Medical College
- Occupation: Physician
- Spouse: Elizabeth B. McMaster (m. 1862)
- Children: 4
- Parent(s): Austin Flint I Anne Balch Skillings

Austin Flint II (March 28, 1836 – September 21, 1915) was an American physician. He carried out extensive experimental investigations in human physiology and made several important discoveries. He assisted in establishing the glycogenic function of the liver; showed that one of the functions of the liver is to separate the cholesterol, a product of the nervous system, from the blood. This becomes a constituent of the bile, and is afterward converted into what he named "stercorin" (better known as coprosterol), the odorous principle of feces.

== Early life ==
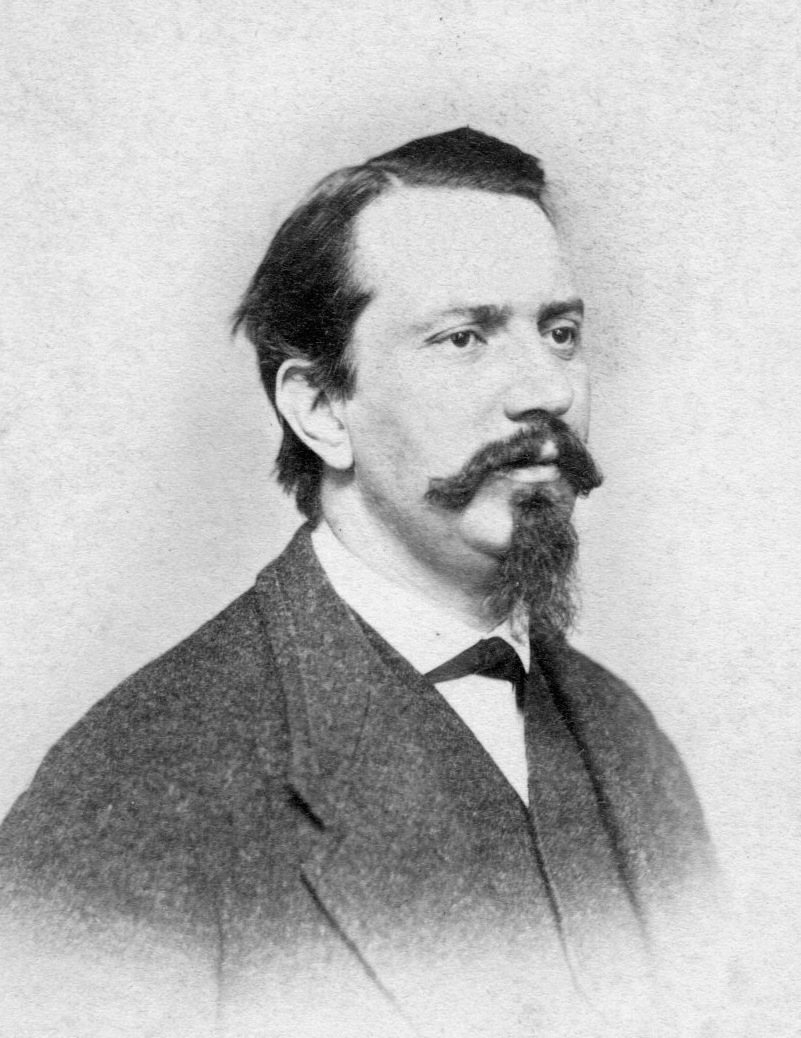
Austin Flint Jr.

He was born on March 28, 1836, in Northampton, Massachusetts, to Austin Flint I (1812–1886), who helped found Bellevue Hospital, and Anne Balch Skillings (1814–1894). His younger sister was Susan Willard Flint (1838–1869), who married Brevet Major C. Grover. His aunts included Mrs. Susan Willard Jewett and Mrs. Elizabeth Henshaw Thiverick.

He attended medical lectures at the University of Louisville from 1854 to 1856 and one year at Harvard Medical School before graduating from Jefferson Medical College, Philadelphia in 1857. Flint was one of six generations of physicians spanning from 1733 to 1955.

== Career ==
From 1857 to 1859, he was editor of the Buffalo Medical Journal, surgeon of Buffalo City Hospital, and professor of physiology and microscopical anatomy in the University at Buffalo. In 1859, he removed to New York City with his father and was appointed professor of physiology in New York Medical College. He was professor of physiology in the New Orleans Medical College in 1860 and studied in Europe in 1860 and 1861.

He was professor of physiology and microscopic anatomy in Bellevue Hospital Medical College, New York City, from 1861 till that institution was consolidated with the medical department of New York University in 1898, when he was appointed professor of physiology in Cornell University Medical College.

He was, in 1874, Surgeon General of New York. He was a member of the executive committee of the New York Prison Association in 1890. He was decorated with the order of Bolivar (third class) of Venezuela in 1891. Flint was president of the New York State Medical Association in 1895; president of the Medical Association of the Greater City of New York in 1899.

He was a member of the following scientific organizations: The American Medical Association; the New York County Medical Association; the American Academy of Medicine (honorary); Association of Military Surgeons of the United States; American Association for the Advancement of Science; the Academy of Science, and the American Medico-Psychological Association, of which he became a member in 1899. He was also a member of the Century Association of New York.

== Personal life ==
Flint was married at Ballston, New York, on December 23, 1862, to Elizabeth B. McMaster. They had four children, one of whom, also named Austin Flint III, was the fifth in direct line of physicians in the Flint family.

He died on September 21, 1915, in Manhattan, New York City.

== Publications ==
His principal works are:

- Experimental Researches into a New Excretory Function of the Liver (1862)
- The Physiology of Man (fourth edition, 1888)
- Chemical Examinations of Urine in Diseases (six editions, 1870–1884)
- Effects of Severe and Protracted Muscular Exercises (1871)
- Source of Muscular Power (1878)
- Text-Book of Human Physiology (1875)
- Experiments Regarding a New Function of the Liver, Separating the Cholesterin of the Blood and Eliminating it as Stercorin (1862)
- The Physiology of the Nervous System (1872)
- Mechanism of Reflex Nervous Action in Normal Respiration (1874)
- The Treatment of Diabetes Mellitus (1884)
- Chemical Examination of the Urine in Disease (1893)
- Stercorin and Cholesterœmia (1897)
- Handbook of Physiology (1905)

== Terms ==
- Flint's arcade — an arteriovenous arch at the base of the renal pyramids.

Dorland's Medical Dictionary (1938)
