= Jonathan Mirsky =

American journalist (1932–2021)

Jonathan Mirsky (November 14, 1932 – September 5, 2021) was an American journalist and historian of China.

== Early life and education ==
The son of molecular biologist Alfred Mirsky and writer Reba Paeff Mirsky, he grew up in New York. He earned his BA in history from Columbia University, and was awarded a PhD in Chinese history from the University of Pennsylvania in 1966, specializing in the history of the Tang dynasty.

His first teaching position was at Dartmouth College. A prominent opponent of the Vietnam War, he did not receive tenure, and left academia for journalism.

== Career as journalist ==
Mirsky's obituary in The Guardian considered that his career "encapsulated the shifts in the way the western left viewed China, from the first decades of communist rule to Beijing’s move to capitalism while still under single-party control," with his work since the 1980s increasingly critical.

His coverage of the 1989 Tiananmen Square protests and massacre for The Observer won him the international reporter of the year title in the 1989 British Press Awards.

He died on September 5, 2021, at the age of 88.
