= Systolic heart murmur =

Medical condition

Auscultogram from normal and abnormal heart sounds

Systolic heart murmurs are heart murmurs heard during systole, i.e. they begin and end between S1 and S2. Many involve stenosis of the semilunar valves or regurgitation of the atrioventricular valves.

== Types ==
- Mid-systolic ejection murmurs are due to blood flow through the semilunar valves. They occur at the start of blood ejection — which starts after S1 — and ends with the cessation of the blood flow — which is before S2. Therefore, the onset of a midsystolic ejection murmur is separated from S1 by the isovolumic contraction phase; the cessation of the murmur and the S2 interval is the aortic or pulmonary hangout time. The resultant configuration of this murmur is a crescendo-decrescendo murmur. Causes of midsystolic ejection murmurs include outflow obstruction, increased flow through normal semilunar valves, dilation of aortic root or pulmonary trunk, or structural changes in the semilunar valves without obstruction.
- Late systolic murmurs start after S1 and, if left sided, extend up to S2, usually in a crescendo manner. Causes include mitral valve prolapse, tricuspid valve prolapse and papillary muscle dysfunction.
- Holosystolic (pansystolic) murmurs start at S1 and extend up to S2. They are usually due to regurgitation in cases such as mitral regurgitation, tricuspid regurgitation, or ventricular septal defect (VSD).

== Individual murmurs ==
=== Mid-systolic ejection ===
Time	Condition	Description
Mid-systolic ejection	Aortic outflow obstruction (Aortic stenosis)	Can be due to aortic valve stenosis or hypertrophic cardiomyopathy (HCM), with a harsh and rough quality. **Valvular aortic stenosis can produce a harsh, or even a musical murmur over the right second intercostal space which radiates into the neck over the two carotid arteries. The most common cause of AS (Aortic stenosis) is calcified valves due to aging. The second most common cause is congenital bicuspid aortic valves (normal valve is tricuspid). In aortic stenosis, heaving apical impulse is present. The distinguishing feature between these two causes is that bicuspid AS has little or no radiation. It can be confirmed if it also has an aortic ejection sound, a short early diastolic murmur, and normal carotid pulse. The murmur in valvular AS decreases with standing and straining with Valsalva maneuver. ** Supravalvular aortic stenosis is loudest at a point slightly higher than in that of valvular AS and may radiate more to the right carotid artery. **Subvalvular aortic stenosis is usually due to hypertrophic cardiomyopathy (HCM), with murmur loudest over the left sternal border or the apex. The murmur in HCM increases in intensity with a standing position as well as straining with Valsalva maneuver.
Mid-systolic ejection	Pulmonic outflow obstruction (Pulmonic stenosis)	A harsh murmur usually on left second intercostal space radiating to left neck and accompanied by palpable thrill. It can be distinguished from a VSD (ventricular septal defect) by listening to the S2, which is normal in VSD but it is widely split in pulmonary stenosis. However, VSD is almost always pansystolic where the murmur of pulmonary stenosis is diamond-shaped and ends clearly before S2. Many innocent murmurs also arise from this location but S1 and S2 must split normally.
Mid-systolic ejection	Dilation of aortic root or pulmonary artery	Produces an ejection sound, with a short ejection systolic murmur and a relatively wide split S2. There is no hemodynamic abnormality. This is similar to pulmonary hypertension except the latter has hemodynamic instabilities.
Mid-systolic ejection	Increased semilunar blood flow	This can occur in situations such as anemia, pregnancy, or hyperthyroidism.
Mid-systolic ejection	Aortic valve sclerosis	This is due to degenerative thickening of the roots of the aortic cusps but produces no obstruction and no hemodynamic instability and thus should be differentiated from aortic stenosis. It is heard over right second intercostal space with a normal carotid pulse and normal S2.
Mid-systolic ejection	Innocent midsystolic murmurs	These murmurs are not accompanied by other abnormal findings. One example of a benign paediatric heart murmur is Still's murmur in children.

=== Late systolic ===
Time	Condition	Description
Late systolic	Mitral valve prolapse	This is the most common cause of late systolic murmurs. It can be heard best over the apex of the heart, usually preceded by clicks. The most common cause of mitral valve prolapse is "floppy" valve (Barlow's) syndrome. If the prolapse becomes severe enough, mitral regurgitation may occur. Any maneuver that decreases left ventricular volume — such as standing, sitting, Valsalva maneuver, and amyl nitrate inhalation — can produce earlier onset of clicks, longer murmur duration, and decreased murmur intensity. Any maneuver that increases left ventricular volume — such as squatting, elevation of legs, hand grip, and phenylephrine — can delay the onset of clicks, shorten murmur duration, and increase murmur intensity.
Late systolic	Tricuspid valve prolapse	Uncommon without concomitant mitral valve prolapse. Best heard over left lower sternal border.
Late systolic	Papillary muscle dysfunction	Usually due to acute myocardial infarction or ischemia, which causes mild mitral regurgitation.

=== Holosystolic (pansystolic) ===
Time	Condition	Description
Holosystolic (pansystolic)	Tricuspid regurgitation	Intensifies upon inspiration. Can be best heard over the fourth left sternal border. The intensity can be accentuated following inspiration (Carvallo's sign) due to increased regurgitant flow in right ventricular volume. Tricuspid regurgitation is most often secondary to pulmonary hypertension. Primary tricuspid regurgitation is less common and can be due to bacterial endocarditis following IV drug use, Ebstein's anomaly, carcinoid disease, or prior right ventricular infarction.
Holosystolic (pansystolic)	Mitral regurgitation or MR	No intensification upon inspiration. In the presence of incompetent mitral valve, the pressure in the L ventricle becomes greater than that in the L atrium at the onset of isovolumic contraction, which corresponds to the closing of the mitral valve (S1). This explains why the murmur in MR starts at the same time as S1. This difference in pressure extends throughout systole and can even continue after the aortic valve has closed, explaining how it can sometimes drown the sound of S2. The murmur in MR is high pitched and best heard at the apex with diaphragm of the stethoscope with patient in the lateral decubitus position. Left ventricular function can be assessed by determining the apical impulse. A normal or hyperdynamic apical impulse suggests good ejection fraction and primary MR. A displaced and sustained apical impulse suggests decreased ejection fraction and chronic and severe MR. This type of murmur is known as the Castex Murmur.
Holosystolic (pansystolic)	Ventricular septal defect	No intensification upon inspiration. VSD is a defect in the ventricular wall, producing a shunt between the left and right ventricles. Since the L ventricle has a higher pressure than the R ventricle, flow during systole occurs from the L to R ventricle, producing the holosystolic murmur. It can be best heard over the left third and fourth intercostal spaces and along the sternal border. It is associated with normal pulmonary artery pressure and thus S2 is normal. This fact can be used to distinguish from pulmonary stenosis, which has a wide splitting S2. When the shunt becomes reversed ("Eisenmenger syndrome"), the murmur may be absent and S2 can become markedly accentuated and single.
