= Reba Paeff Mirsky =

American musician and writer (1902–1966)

- Born: May 25, 1902; Boston, Massachusetts, U.S.
- Died: November 22, 1966 (aged 64); New York City, U.S.
- Education: Radcliffe College; Harvard University
- Occupations: Classical musician; children's writer
- Employer: The New School for Social Research
- Awards: Guggenheim Fellowship (1953)
- Musical career
- Genres: Classical
- Instruments: Clavichord; harpischord; virginals; flute; recorder

Reba Paeff Mirsky (May 25, 1902 – November 22, 1966) was an American classical musician and children's writer. A 1953 Guggenheim Fellow, she wrote three books on the fictional Zulu girl Nomusa: Thirty-one Brothers and Sisters (1952), Seven Grandmothers (1955), and Nomusa and the New Magic (1962).

== Biography ==
Reba Paeff was born on May 25, 1902, in Boston. She was one of six children of Louis Paeff, a Jewish emigrant from Minsk who later became a local businessman. She began learning to play musical instruments as a young child, starting with the piano and soon teaching it to others. She then obtained a BA and Phi Beta Kappa status from Radcliffe College in 1921 and was a graduate student at Harvard University from 1921 to 1922.

Mirsky performed for Amor Musicae, the New School Recorder Ensemble, and the New York Recorder Ensemble, and she played clavichord, harpischord, and the virginals, as well as flute and recorder. John Briggs of The New York Times said that her clavichord performance of Johann Kuhnau's The Fight between David and Goliath at a 1958 Amor Musicae concert "sounded like an over-sized guitar played by an extra-ordinarily gifted performer with two right hands and two left hands".

Mirsky taught music at the City and Country School and The New School for Social Research and worked as music director (1943–1949) at Ethical Culture Fieldston School. She worked at Hargail Music Press as an editor from 1944 to 1952.

In addition to music, Mirsky was a children's writer. In 1952, she published her children's book Thirty-one Brothers and Sisters, inspired by her experiences with befriending Zulu girls; she won the Charles W. Follett Award for that book. In 1953, she was awarded a Guggenheim Fellowship "for studies of the lives of children in Zulu and Toro society", allowing her to travel to the homeland of the Zulu people and publish two more sequels for that book: Seven Grandmothers (1955) and Nomusa and the New Magic (1962). She also wrote several composer biographies aimed at children, with subjects including Johann Sebastian Bach, Ludwig van Beethoven, Johannes Brahms, Joseph Haydn, and Wolfgang Amadeus Mozart.

Mirsky's husband was molecular biologist Alfred Mirsky. She had two children, including Jonathan Mirsky. Her sister was sculptor Bashka Paeff and her brother-in-law was Louis Lazarus Silverman. At the time of her death, she had lived at 350 Central Park West.

Mirsky died on November 22, 1966, at Columbia-Presbyterian Medical Center, aged 64.

== Bibliography ==
- Thirty-one Brothers and Sisters (1952) (Note: Reviews of this book:)
- Seven Grandmothers (1955)
- Nomusa and the New Magic (1962)
