= Saunders (imprint) =

Academic publisher based in the United States

- Parent company: Private, Elsevier
- Founded: 1888; 137 years ago
- Founder: Walter Burns Saunders
- Country of origin: United States
- Headquarters location: Philadelphia
- Nonfiction topics: Medicine
- Official website: store.elsevier.com/Saunders/IMP_23/

Saunders is an American academic publisher based in the United States. It is currently an imprint of Elsevier.

Formerly independent, the W. B. Saunders company was acquired by CBS in 1968, who added it to their publishing division Holt, Rinehart & Winston. When CBS left the publishing field in 1986, it sold the academic publishing units to Harcourt Brace Jovanovich. Harcourt was acquired by Reed Elsevier in 2001.

W. B. Saunders published the Kinsey Reports and Dorland's medical reference works. Elsevier still sells the latter under the Saunders imprint.
