= Still's murmur =

Type of heart murmur

Recording of an innocent Still's murmur in a toddler

Still's murmur (also known as vibratory murmur) is a common type of benign or "innocent" functional heart murmur that is not associated with any sort of cardiac disorder or any other medical condition. It can occur at any age although it is most common among children two to seven years of age and it is rare in adulthood.

Still's murmur was initially described by George Frederic Still, England's first professor of childhood medicine at the Great Ormond Street Hospital for Children. In his pediatric textbook Common Disorders and Diseases of Childhood (published 1909), Still noted:

I should like to draw attention to a particular bruit which has somewhat of a musical character, but is neither of sinister omen nor does it indicate endocarditis of any sort. ... its characteristic feature is a twangy sound, very like that made by twanging a piece of tense string ... Whenever may be its origin, I think it is clearly functional, that is to say, not due to any organic disease of the heart either congenital or acquired.

== Signs and symptoms ==
Still's murmur is detected via auscultation with a stethoscope. It has a peculiar "musical", "resonant" or "vibratory" quality that is quite unique. It is generally most easily heard at the left middle or lower sternal border and the right upper sternal border, often with radiation to the carotid arteries, although other locations are common. The murmur is usually louder in the supine position and may only be audible in the supine position.

The Still's murmur can be differentiated from pathological murmurs by this musical quality and lack of extra snaps or clicks in the heart sounds.

Because the Still's murmur has never been associated with any sort of cardiac disorder, it has no associated symptoms.

== Causes ==
Heart murmurs are sounds generated by blood flowing through the structures of the heart. The location of the Still's murmur on examination suggests resonation of blood in the left ventricular outflow tract and aorta, and this is supported by studies that have shown that the murmur is more intense over the aortic valve than the pulmonary valve. There has been conjecture that the vibratory or musical quality of the murmur is caused by vibration of “false chordae” of the left ventricle, which are a common finding in normal individuals, but no relationship between the two has been proven. There is some evidence that a smaller aorta with higher peak flow velocities are associated with Still's murmur, which certainly fits in well with the concept that the murmur is a musical phenomenon.

== Diagnosis ==
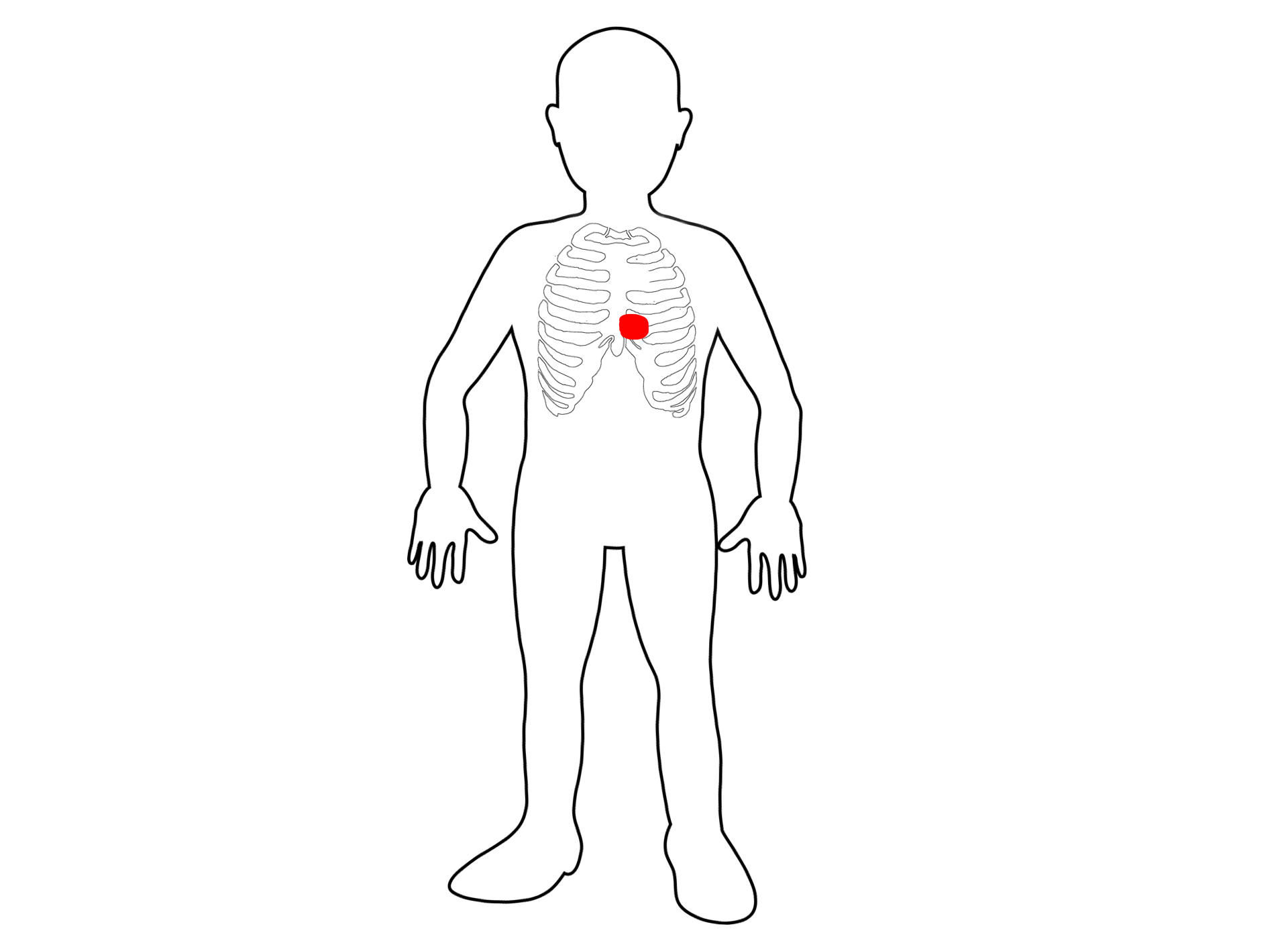
Positioning for stethoscope to best hear Still's Murmur

Still's murmur is diagnosed in the course of a physical examination of the patient, usually using a stethoscope. The murmur has a vibratory quality that can be detected as a regular frequency on phonocardiography, although this type of testing is now rarely used. Additional testing including electrocardiography (ECG or EKG) or echocardiography may be helpful in ruling out other conditions, particularly if the physical examination is not completely characteristic of Still's murmur. When additional testing is done in the setting of Still's murmur the results are normal, since Still's murmur is not associated with any sort of cardiovascular pathology.

== Treatment ==
Still's murmur does not represent any sort of disorder and does not present a health risk, so no treatment is necessary.

== Epidemiology ==
Still's murmurs may occur in as many as a third of all children. This type of murmur occurs most often in children two to seven years of age, but can occur in younger or older children. In most cases, the innocent Still's murmur is present on and off during childhood and resolves on its own by young adulthood.

== Prognosis ==
The Still's murmur is a harmless finding that does not suggest any medical disorder. In most cases, Still's murmur disappears around adolescence without medical intervention.

However, families are often anxious when told their child has a heart murmur. Parents of children diagnosed with Still's murmur may experience significantly greater anxiety than the children themselves. In a study conducted on the families impacted by Still's murmur, the parents were worried about a variety of issues. Their concerns included: the need for medicine (49%), facing sports restrictions (41%), the need for heart surgery (29%), other offspring also having Still's murmur (20%), and early death (13%). Mothers worried that they did something during pregnancy that caused the murmur (19%). Even after being reassured by the child's physician, 17% of parents were still anxious. After hearing from a cardiologist that the children would be fine, only 7% of the parents were still nervous.
