= Cardiac myxoma =

Atrial myxoma
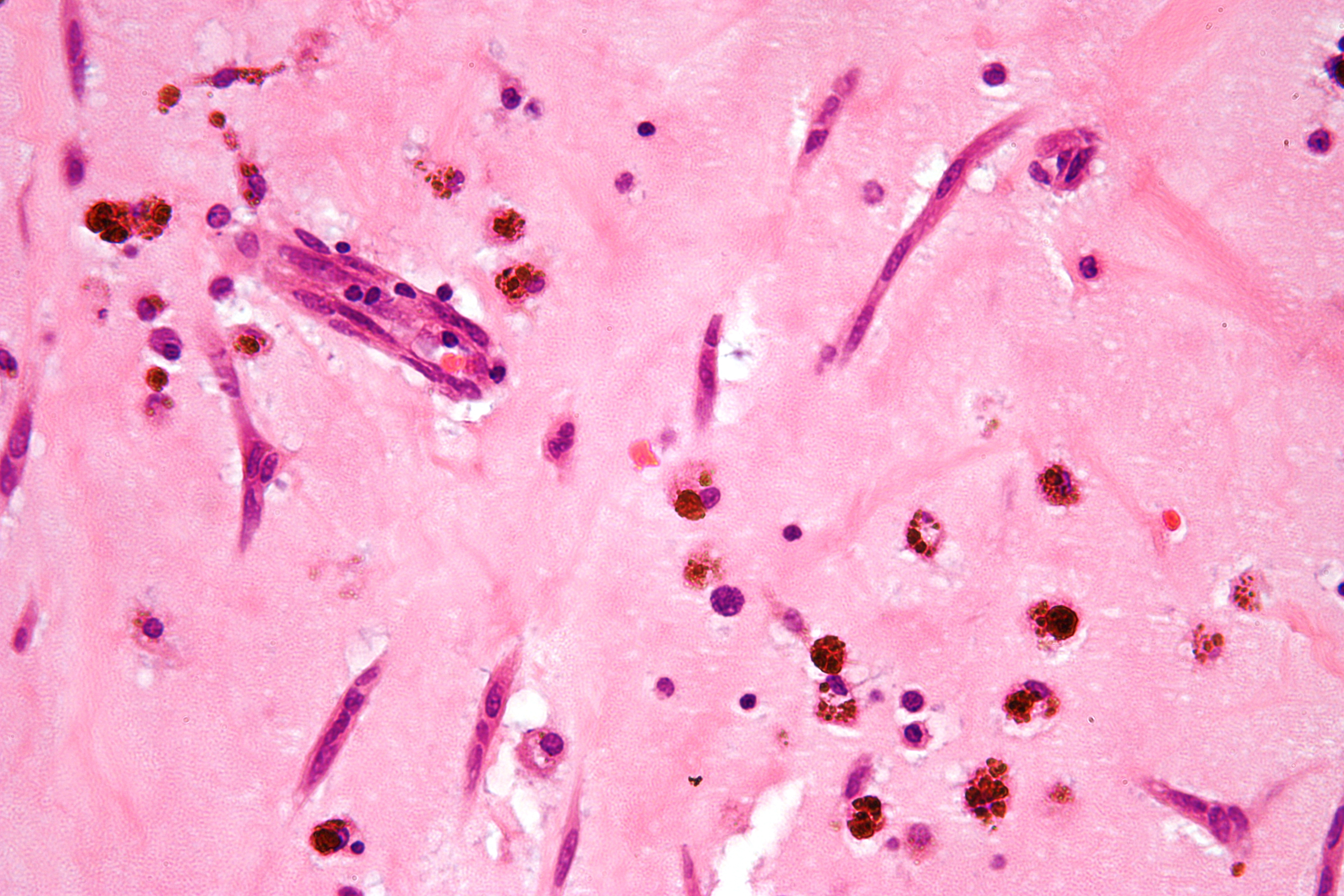
- Micrograph of an atrial myxoma. H&E stain.
- Specialty: Cardiology

A myxoma is a rare benign tumor of the heart. Myxomata are the most common primary cardiac tumor in adults, and are most commonly found within the left atrium near the valve of the fossa ovalis. Myxoma may also develop in the other heart chambers. The tumor is derived from multipotent mesenchymal cells. Cardiac myxoma can affect adults between 30 and 60 years of age.

== Signs and symptoms ==
Symptoms may occur at any time, but most often they accompany a change of body position. Pedunculated myxomata can have a "wrecking ball effect", as they lead to stasis and may eventually embolize themselves. Symptoms may include:

- Shortness of breath with activity
- Platypnea – Difficulty breathing in the upright position with relief in the supine position
- Paroxysmal nocturnal dyspnea – Breathing difficulty when asleep
- Dizziness
- Fainting
- Palpitations – Sensation of feeling your heart beat
- Chest pain or tightness
- Sudden Death (In which case the disease is an autopsy finding)

The symptoms and signs of left atrial myxomata often mimic mitral stenosis. General symptoms may also be present, such as:

- Cough
- Pulmonary edema – as blood backs up into the pulmonary artery, after increased pressures in the left atrium and atrial dilation
- Hemoptysis
- Fever
- Cachexia – Involuntary weight loss
- General discomfort (malaise)
- Joint pain
- Blue discoloration of the skin, especially the fingers change color upon pressure, cold, or stress (Raynaud's phenomenon)
- Clubbing – Curvature of nails accompanied with soft tissue enlargement of the fingers
- Swelling – any part of the body
- Presystolic heart murmur

These general symptoms may also mimic those of infective endocarditis.

=== Complications ===
- Arrhythmias
- Pulmonary edema
- Peripheral emboli
- Spread (metastasis) of the tumor
- Blockage of the mitral heart valve
- Stroke
- Fusiform cerebral aneurysms

== Causes ==
Myxomata are the most common type of adult primary heart tumor. Most myxomata arise sporadically (90%), and only about 10% are thought to arise due to inheritance.

About 10% of myxomata are inherited, as in Carney syndrome. Such tumors are called familial myxomata. They tend to occur in more than one part of the heart at a time, and often cause symptoms at a younger age than other myxomata. Other abnormalities are observed in people with Carney syndrome include skin myxomata, pigmentation, endocrine hyperactivity, schwannomas and epithelioid blue nevi. Myxomata are more common in women than men.

== Diagnosis ==
A doctor will listen to the heart with a stethoscope. A "tumor plop" (a sound related to movement of the tumor), abnormal heart sounds, or a murmur similar to the mid-diastolic rumble of mitral stenosis may be heard. These sounds may change when the patient changes position.

Right atrial myxomata rarely produce symptoms until they have grown to be at least 13 cm (about 5 inches) wide.

Tests may include:

- Echocardiogram and Doppler study
- Chest x-ray
- CT scan of chest
- Heart MRI
- Left heart angiography
- Right heart angiography
- ECG—may show atrial fibrillation

Blood tests:

- Blood tests: An FBC may show anemia and increased WBCs (white blood cells). The erythrocyte sedimentation rate (ESR) is usually increased.
Echocardiogram of atrial myxoma

Echocardiogram showing atrial myxoma

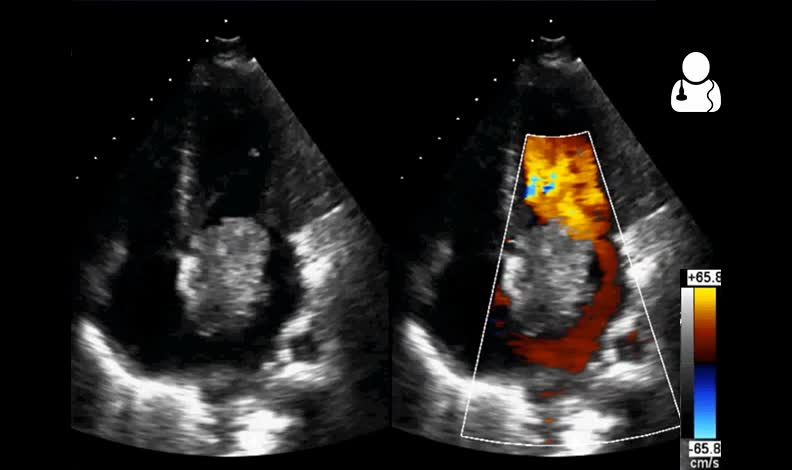
Echocardiogram showing atrial myxoma
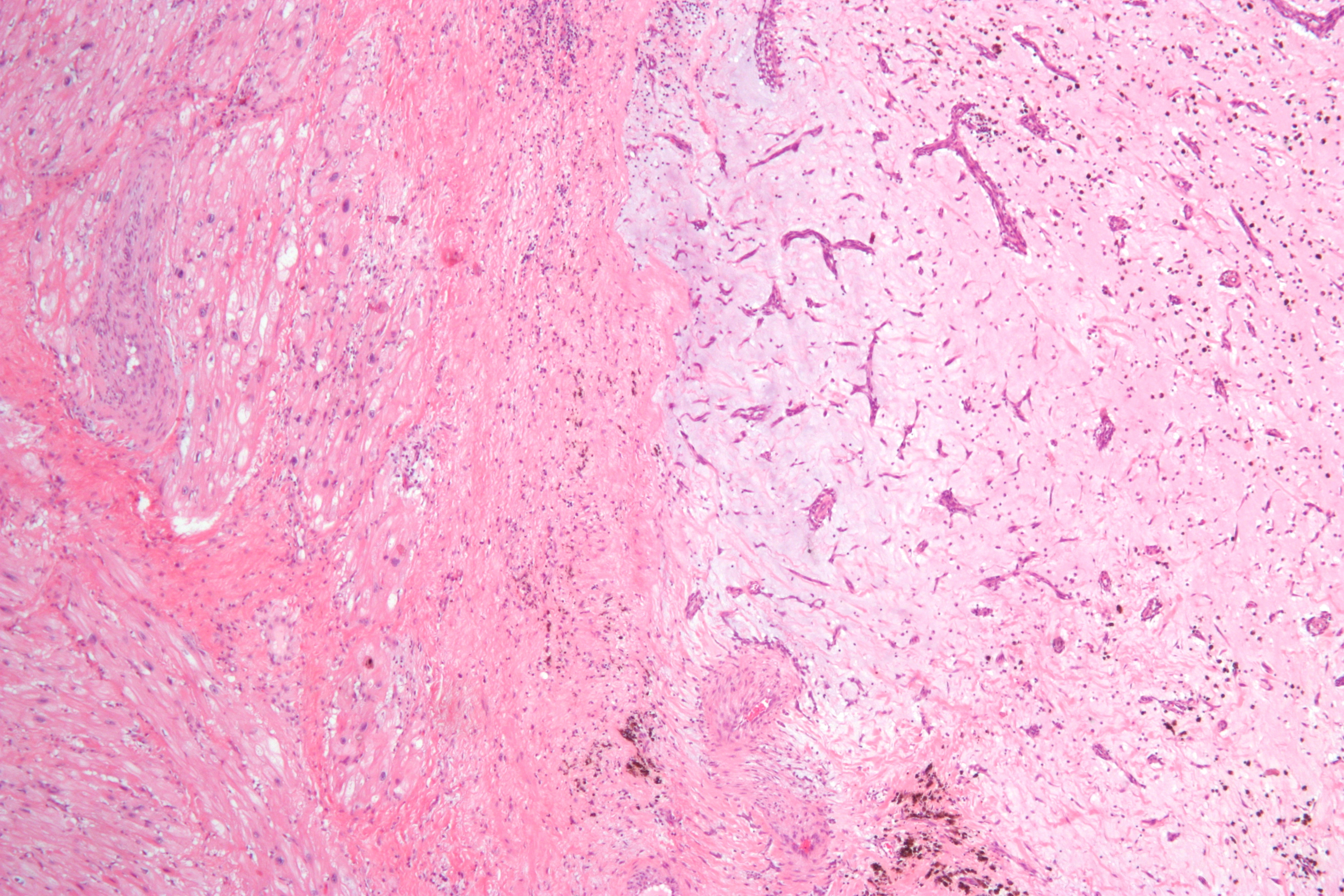
Atrial myxoma and myocardium. H&E stain.

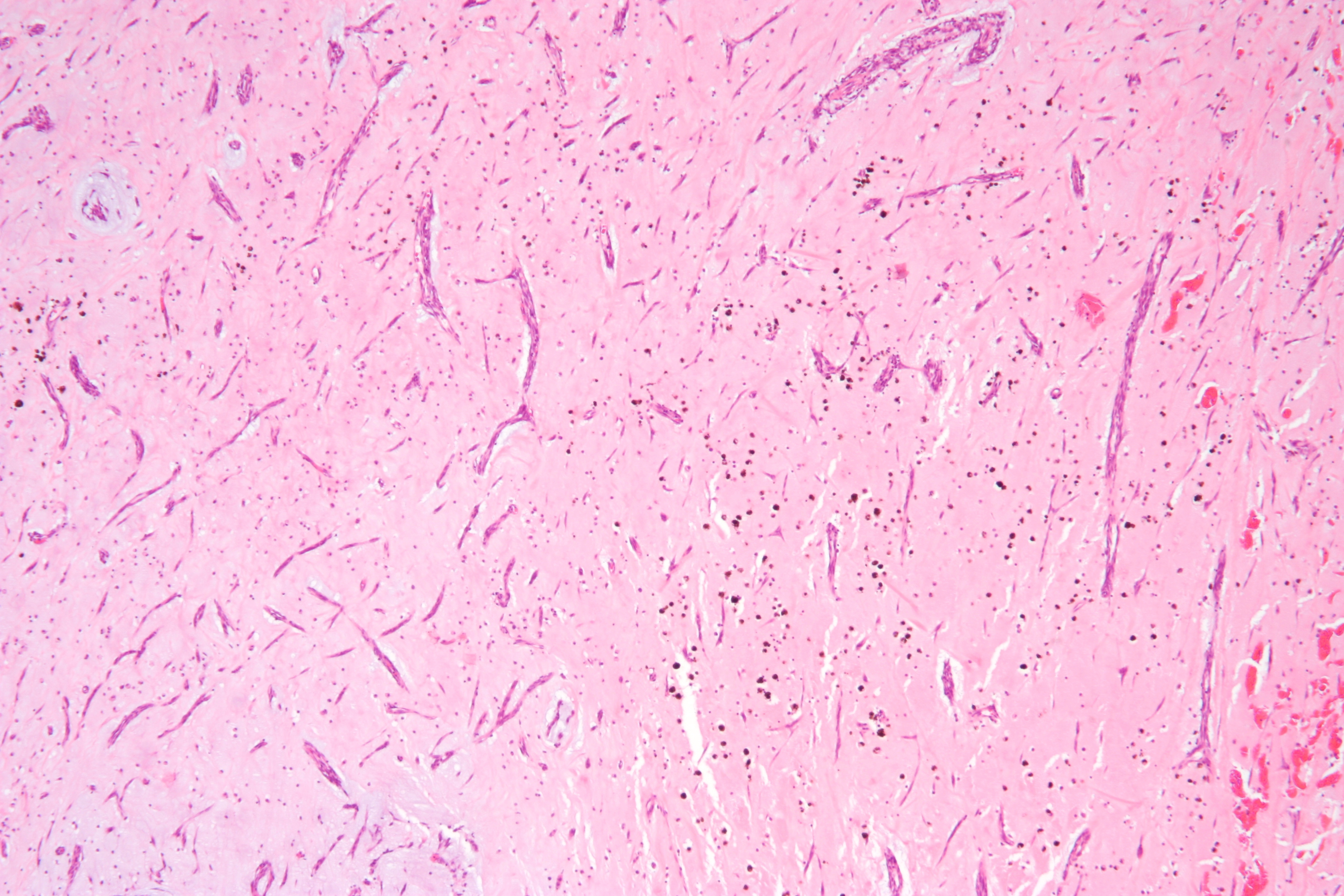
Atrial myxoma. H&E stain.

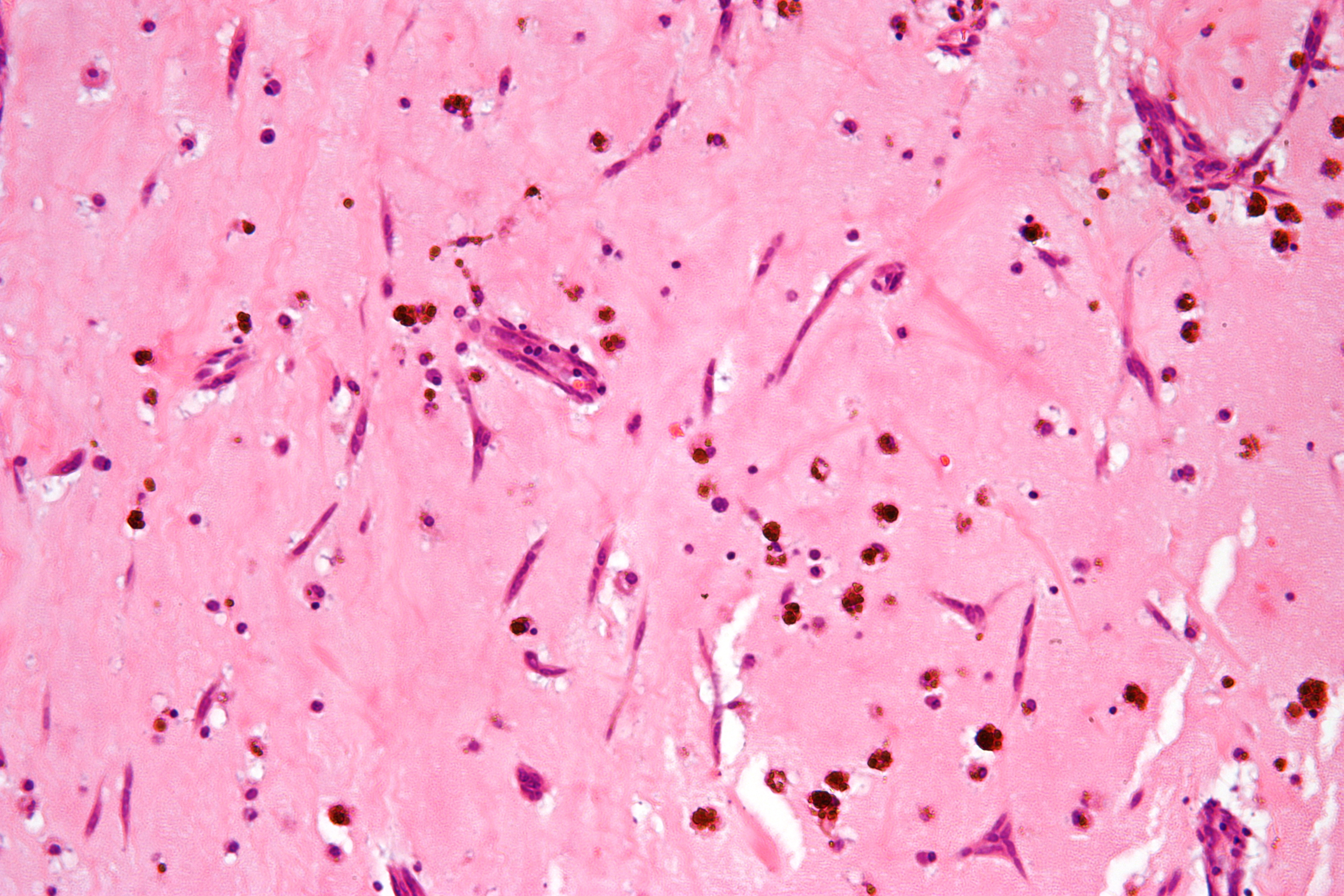
Atrial myxoma. H&E stain.

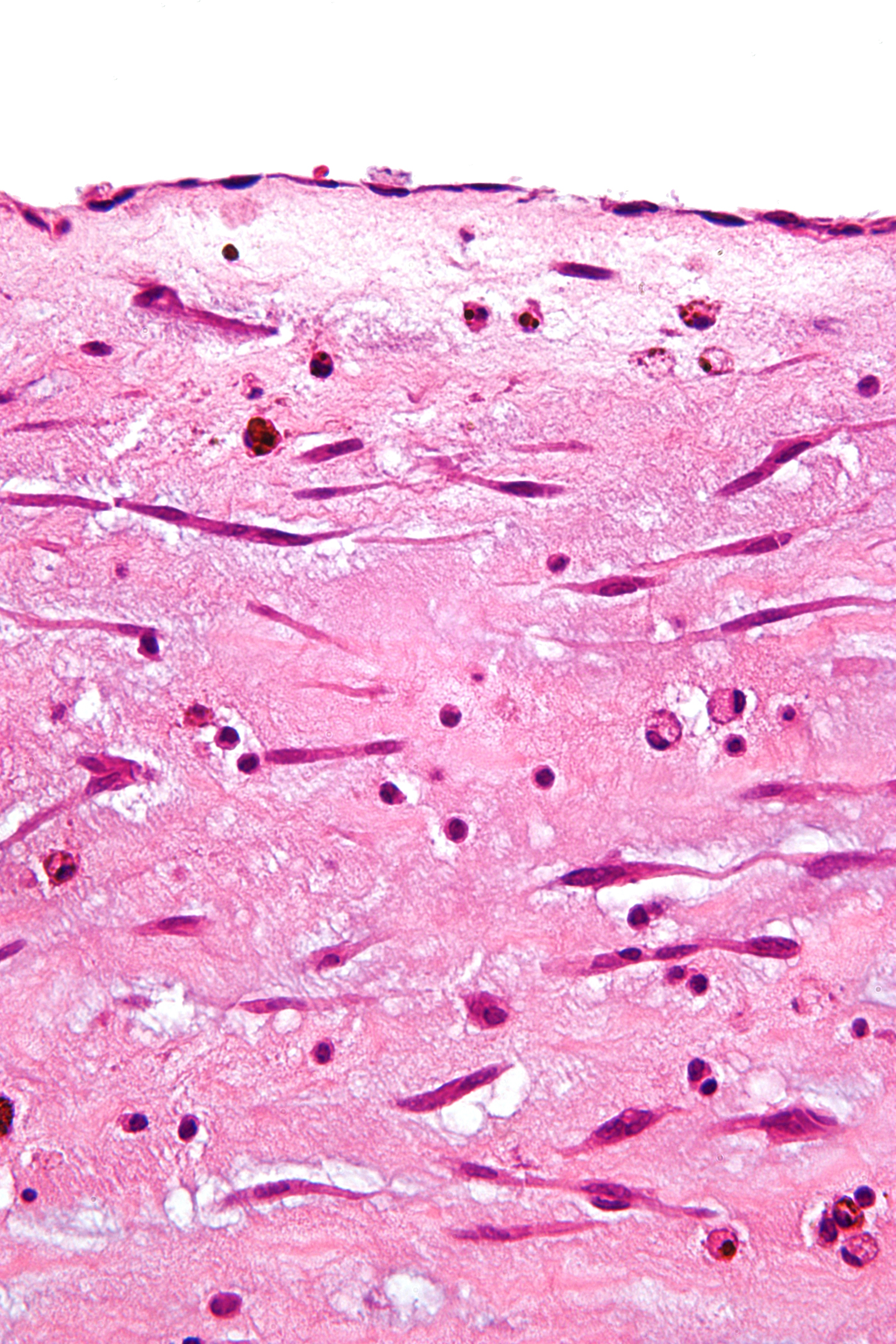
Atrial myxoma covered by endothelium. H&E stain.

== Treatment ==
The surgery is treatment of choice, tumor must be surgically removed. Some patients will also need their mitral valve replaced. This can be done during the same surgery. Usually, inadequate excision of the tumor, development from a secondary focus, or intracardiac implantation from the primary tumor are the attributable explanation for recurrence, and it is more likely to occur in the first 10 postoperative years, especially in younger patients.

== Prognosis ==
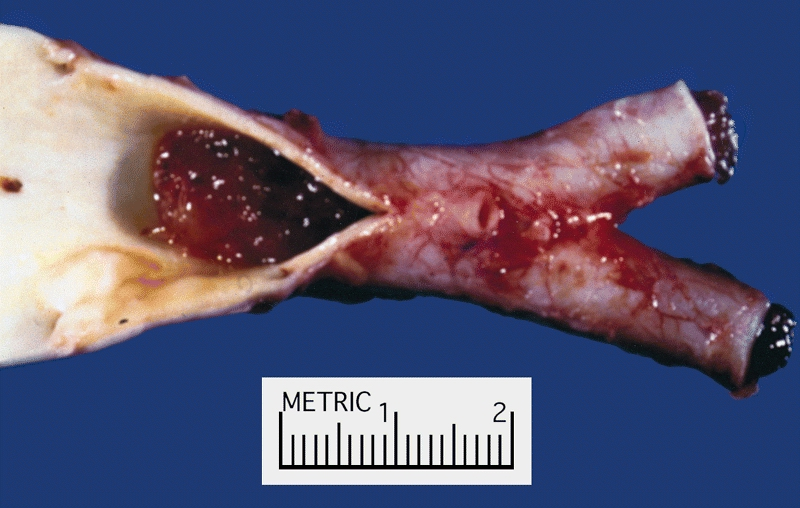
An embolized fragment of an atrial myxoma in the iliac bifurcation.

Although a myxoma is not malignant with risk of metastasis, complications are common. Untreated, a myxoma can lead to an embolism (tumor cells breaking off and traveling with the bloodstream). Myxoma fragments can move to the brain, eye, or limbs.

If the tumor continues to enlarge inside the heart, it can block blood flow through the mitral valve and cause symptoms of mitral stenosis or mitral regurgitation. This may require emergency surgery to prevent sudden death.

== See also ==
- Myxoma
- Interleukin 6
- Papillary fibroelastoma
- Rhabdomyomas
- Cardiac sarcomas
