= British Pediatric Association Classification of Diseases =

The British Pediatric Association Classification of Diseases is a system of diagnostic codes used for pediatrics.

== History ==
An extension to ICD-9 was published in 1979.

An extension to ICD-10 has also been published.

It is the basis for the U.S. Centers for Disease Control and Prevention's six digit codes for reportable congenital conditions. These are also known as the "CDC/BPA codes". This system is in turn is the basis for the Texas Disease Index.
