= Presystolic murmur =

Type of heart murmur

A presystolic murmur, also called presystolic accentuation, is a type of diastolic heart murmur typically associated with the opening snap in mitral valve stenosis. It is heard following the middiastolic rumble of the stenotic valve, during the diastasis phase, making it a "late diastolic" murmur.

The murmur is heard due to antegrade flow of blood through a progressively narrowing mitral opening during the end of the atrial systole. This antegrade flow through the mitral valve before it completely closes appears to be the result of a pressure gradient at the end of diastole. As its name indicates, the presystolic murmur is heard before the mitral valve produces the S1 heart sound.

Less often, a presystolic murmur can be heard when a right atrial myxoma causes a tricuspid valve obstruction to blood flow.
