= Dorland's medical reference works =

Family of medical reference works

Dorland's is the brand name of a family of medical reference works (including dictionaries, spellers and word books, and spell-check software) in various media spanning printed books, CD-ROMs, and online content. The flagship products are Dorland's Illustrated Medical Dictionary (currently in its 33rd edition, published in 2019) and Dorland's Pocket Medical Dictionary (currently in its 30th edition). The principal dictionary was first published in 1890 as the American Illustrated Medical Dictionary, including 770 pages. The pocket edition, called the American Pocket Medical Dictionary, was first published in 1898, consisting of just over 500 pages.

With the death of the editor William Alexander Newman Dorland, AM, MD in 1956, the dictionaries were retitled to incorporate his name, which was how they had generally come to be known. The illustrated dictionary had grown to 2144 pages for the 33rd edition.

The dictionaries were historically published by Saunders.

== List of products ==
=== English-language originals published by Saunders ===
- American Illustrated Medical Dictionary
- American Pocket Medical Dictionary (until 1956)
- Dorland's Illustrated Medical Dictionary (33rd edition in 2019)
- Dorland's Illustrated Medical Dictionary on CD-ROM
- Dorland's Illustrated Medical Dictionary online
- Dorland's Pocket Medical Dictionary (currently in its 30th edition)
- Dorland's Pocket Medical Dictionary on CD-ROM
- Dorland's Electronic Medical Speller CD-ROM (various release versions)
- Dorland's Alternative Medicine Word Book for Medical Transcriptionists (2003) (ISBN 0721695221)
- Dorland's Dentistry Word Book for Medical Transcriptionists (2003) (ISBN 0721693938)
- Dorland's Pediatrics Word Book for Medical Transcriptionists (2003) (ISBN 0721695248)
- Dorland's Psychiatry Word Book for Medical Transcriptionists (2003) (ISBN 072169523X)
- Dorland's Dermatology Word Book for Medical Transcriptionists (2002) (ISBN 0721695264)
- Dorland's Laboratory/Pathology Word Book for Medical Transcriptionists (2002) (ISBN 0721695256)
- Dorland's Medical Equipment Word Book for Medical Transcriptionists (2002) (ISBN 0721695213)
- Dorland's Gastroenterology Word Book for Medical Transcriptionists (2001) (ISBN 072169389X)
- Dorland's Immun. & Endocrinology Word Book for Medical Transcriptionists (2001) (ISBN 072169392X)
- Dorland's OB/GYN Word Book for Medical Transcriptionists (2001) (ISBN 0721693911)
- Dorland's Orthopedic Word Book for Medical Transcriptionists (2001) (ISBN 0721693903)
- Dorland's Plastic Surgery Word Book for Medical Transcriptionists (2001) (ISBN 0721693954)
- Dorland's Cardiology Word Book for Medical Transcriptionists (2000) (ISBN 072169151X)
- Dorland's Neurology Word Book for Medical Transcriptionists (2000) (ISBN 0721690785)
- Dorland's Radiology/Oncology Word Book for Medical Transcriptionists (2000) (ISBN 0721691501)
- Dorland's Dentistry Speller (1994)
- Dorland's Medical Speller (1992)
- Dorland's Cardiology Speller (1992)
- Dorland's Medical Abbreviations (1992)

=== Translated co-editions published by partners ===
In addition to the Saunders titles in English, there have also been numerous translated co-editions around the world. Listed below are the latest translated co-editions of the flagship product Dorland's Illustrated Medical Dictionary, together with the languages for the translations and the names of the publishers:

- Chinese (28th Edition)—Xi'an World Publishing Corp., Xi'an, China
- Indonesian (26th Edition)—E.G.C. Medical Publishers, Jakarta, Indonesia
- Italian (28th Edition)—Edizioni Scientifiche Internazionali (ESI), Milan, Italy
- Japanese (28th Edition)—Hirokawa Publishing Company, Tokyo, Japan
- Portuguese (28th Edition)—Editiora Manole Ltda., São Paulo, Brazil
- Spanish (30th Edition)—Elsevier España, S.A., Madrid, Spain
- Vietnamese (30th Edition)—Medical Publishing House One Member Company Limited, Hanoi, Vietnam

== Publisher ==
Dorland's was published for over a century by the W.B. Saunders Company, which was an independent medical publisher during most of that time. In the 1980s and 1990s, W.B. Saunders was acquired first by CBS and then by Harcourt. In 2001, the company was absorbed into Elsevier, where the name Saunders (without the W.B.) was used as an imprint name. The 2020 33rd edition imprint is Elsevier.

Contexo Media's Dorland Healthcare Information, publisher of Dorland's Medical Directory, appears to be unrelated to Elsevier, Saunders, and the Dorland's family of medical reference works.

== See also ==
- Medical dictionary
