= Medical University of Vienna =

Public university in Austria

- Medizinische Universität Wien
- Other name: MedUni Wien
- Type: Public
- Established: 12 March 1365 (as part of University of Vienna)
- Parent institution: University of Vienna (until 1 January 2004)
- Rector: Markus Müller
- Administrative staff: around 6,000
- Students: around 8,000
- Location: Vienna, Austria; 48°13′12″N 16°21′05″E
- Campus: Urban
- Nobel Laureates: 7 (University of Vienna: 15)
- Colors: Blue and White
- Nickname: MedUni Wien
- Website: www.meduniwien.ac.at
- Data as of 2016

The Medical University of Vienna (MedUni Wien, German: Medizinische Universität Wien) is a public university located in Vienna, Austria. It is the direct successor to the faculty of medicine at the University of Vienna, founded in 1365 by Rudolf IV, Duke of Austria. As one of the oldest medical schools in the world, it is the oldest in the German-speaking countries, and was the second medical faculty in the Holy Roman Empire, after the Charles University of Prague.

The Medical University of Vienna is the largest medical organisation in Austria, as well as one of the top-level research institutions in Europe and provides Europe's fifth largest hospital, the Vienna General Hospital, with all of its medical staff. It consists of 31 university clinics and clinical institutes, and 12 medical-theoretical departments, which perform around 48,000 operations each year. The Vienna General Hospital has about 100,000 patients treated as inpatients and 605,000 treated as outpatients each year.

There have been seven Nobel Prize laureates affiliated with the medical faculty, and fifteen in total with the University of Vienna. These include Robert Bárány, Julius Wagner-Jauregg and Karl Landsteiner, the discoverer of the ABO blood type system and the Rhesus factor. Sigmund Freud qualified as a doctor at the medical faculty and worked as a doctor and lecturer at the General Hospital, carrying out research into cerebral palsy, aphasia and microscopic neuroanatomy.

In the 2014–15 Times Higher Education Rankings, the Medical University of Vienna is listed among the top 15 medical schools in Europe and 49th in the world for category of Clinical, Pre-Clinical and Health.

In 2019, there were 8,217 applicants for 660 places in medicine proper and 80 in dentistry, which corresponds to an admission rate of about 9,01% Admission is based upon ranking in an admission test called "MedAT", which is carried out every summer in conjunction with the three other public medical schools of Austria: the Medical University of Graz, the Medical University of Innsbruck and the Medical Faculty at the Johannes Kepler University Linz.

== History ==
=== Founding ===
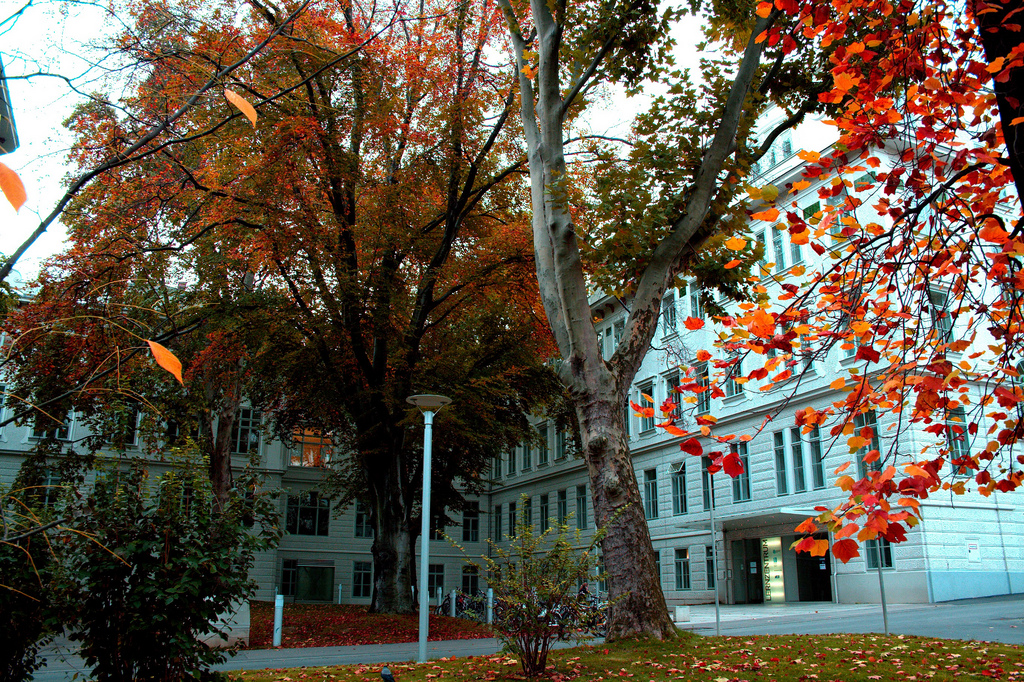
Department of studies, Medical University of Vienna.

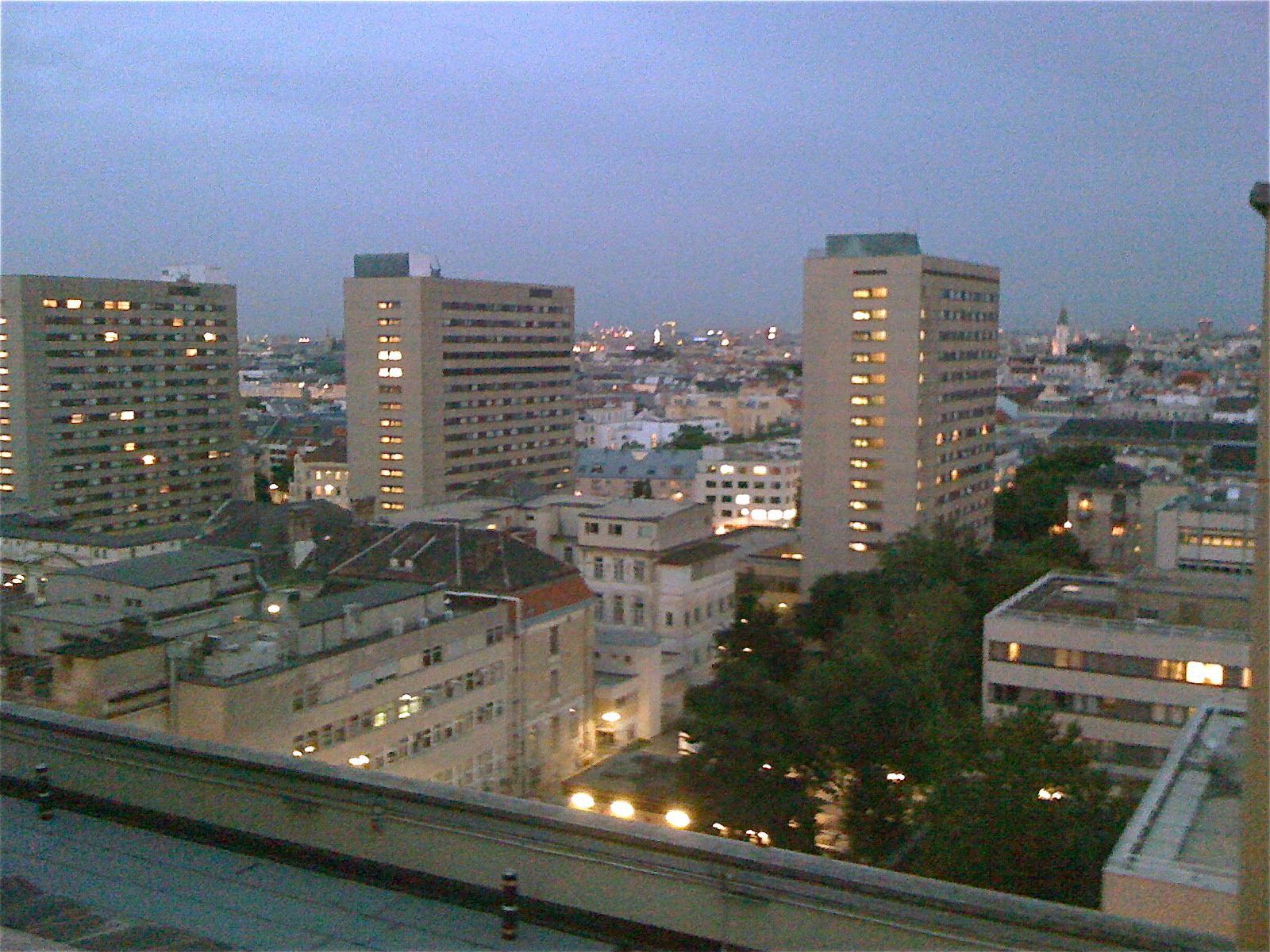
View of Vienna, Austria at dusk from the roof of the Vienna General Hospital (AKH Wien).

==== From the middle ages to the Age of Enlightenment ====
As the founding member of the Alma mater Rudolfina (University of Vienna) founded in 1365, the medical faculty was already widely renowned in medieval times as an authority in medicine. Faculty records from as far back as 1399 document its mediation in disputes between barber surgeons, midwives, and local landowners. During the reign of Maria Theresia, Viennese medicine first attained international significance. The Habsburg Monarch summoned the Dutch physician, Gerard van Swieten, to Vienna. He in turn laid the foundation for the Vienna Medical School and paved the way for other leading figures. Anton de Haen, Maximilian Stoll, Lorenz Gasser, Anton von Störck, and the discoverer of the percussion technique, Leopold Auenbrugger, all taught and conducted research in the imperial city. Based on longstanding traditions, what now is referred to as "bedside teaching" also became the paradigmatic educational method during this period.

When the Vienna General Hospital opened in 1784, physicians acquired a new facility that gradually developed into the most important research center. During the 19th century, the "Second Viennese Medical School" emerged with the contributions of physicians such as Karl Rokitansky, Josef Skoda, Ferdinand von Hebra and Ignaz Philipp Semmelweis. Basic medical science expanded and specialization advanced. Furthermore, the first dermatology, eye, as well as otolaryngology clinics in the world were founded in Vienna.

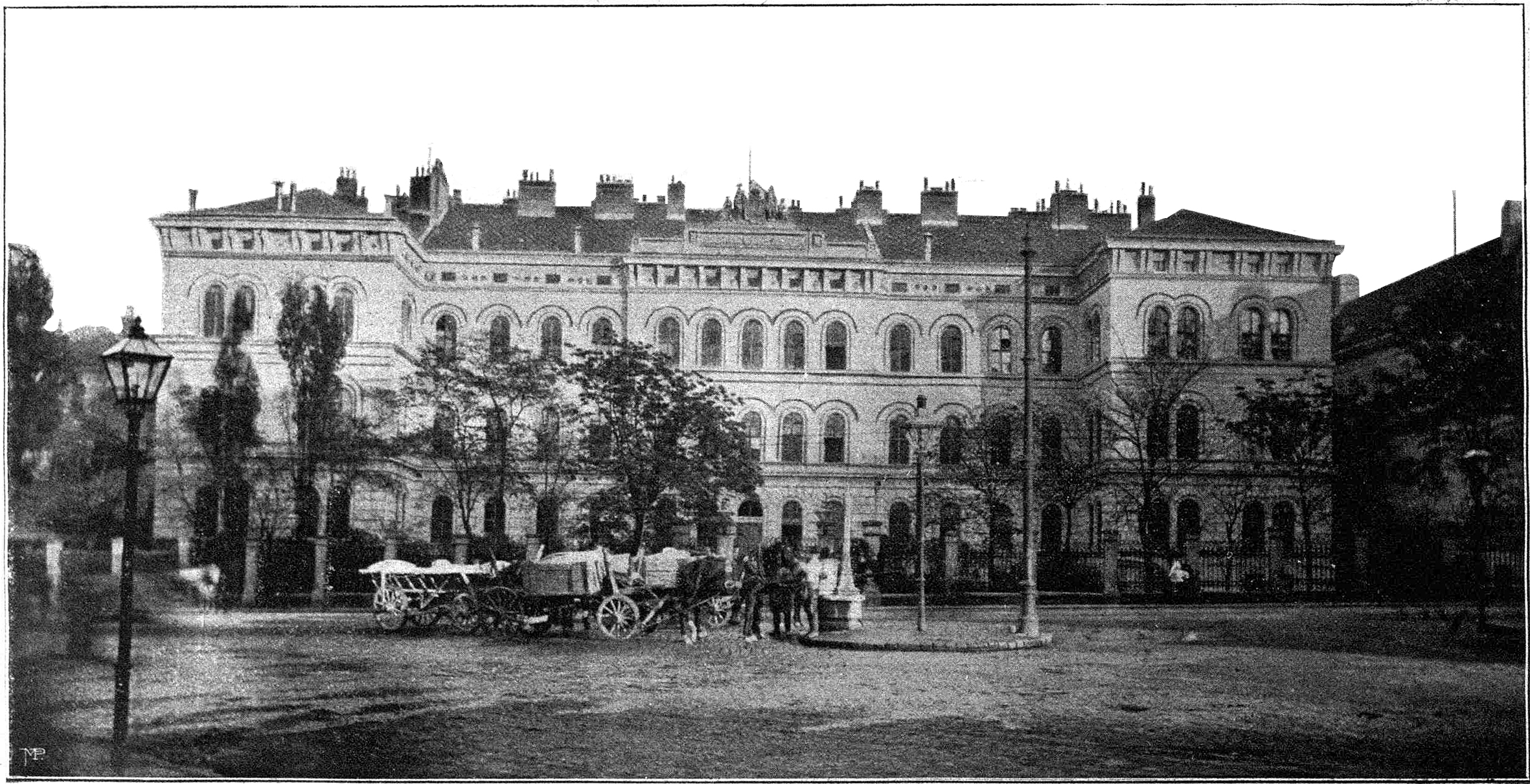
The Pathological–Anatomical Institute in 1898.

==== At the height of the Austro-Hungarian Empire ====
At the beginning of the 20th century, Viennese Medicine belonged to the first class internationally. Clemens von Pirquet defined the concepts of "allergy" and "serum sickness," Ernst Peter Pick conducted significant experiments on the chemical specificity of immunological reactions, and the Vienna School of Dentistry (founded by Bernhard Gotlieb) reached its zenith in the 1920s. All four Nobel Prizes, which were granted to (former) Viennese physicians during the next decades Robert Bárány (1914), Julius Wagner-Jauregg (1927), Karl Landsteiner (1930), and Otto Loewi (1936), were the result of work undertaken at this time. The excellent tradition and research extended well into the First Austrian Republic. Under the auspices of the Medical Association of Vienna, which was founded in Vienna, well-received postgraduate courses for doctors worldwide were organized into the 1930s.

==== During the Second World War ====
With the annexation of Austria by National Socialist Germany on 13 March 1938 the darkest phase in Viennese medicine began. More than half of the university medical instructors, mostly those of Jewish descent, and 65% of Viennese physicians were dismissed. Many renowned researchers, physicians, and students were forced to emigrate or died in concentration camps and under other tragic circumstances.

==== After the Second World War ====
In the aftermath of World War II difficult years lay ahead of the university. The past glory had faded considerably. Moreover, 75% of all university medical instructors had to be dismissed because of their moderate to heavy involvement with the National Socialist regime. They were gradually replaced by a newly trained generation of educators. This double rupture in Viennese Medicine, which occurred in just a few years, caused repercussions that lasted for long after the war.

==== From the Faculty of Medicine of the University of Vienna to the Medical University of Vienna ====
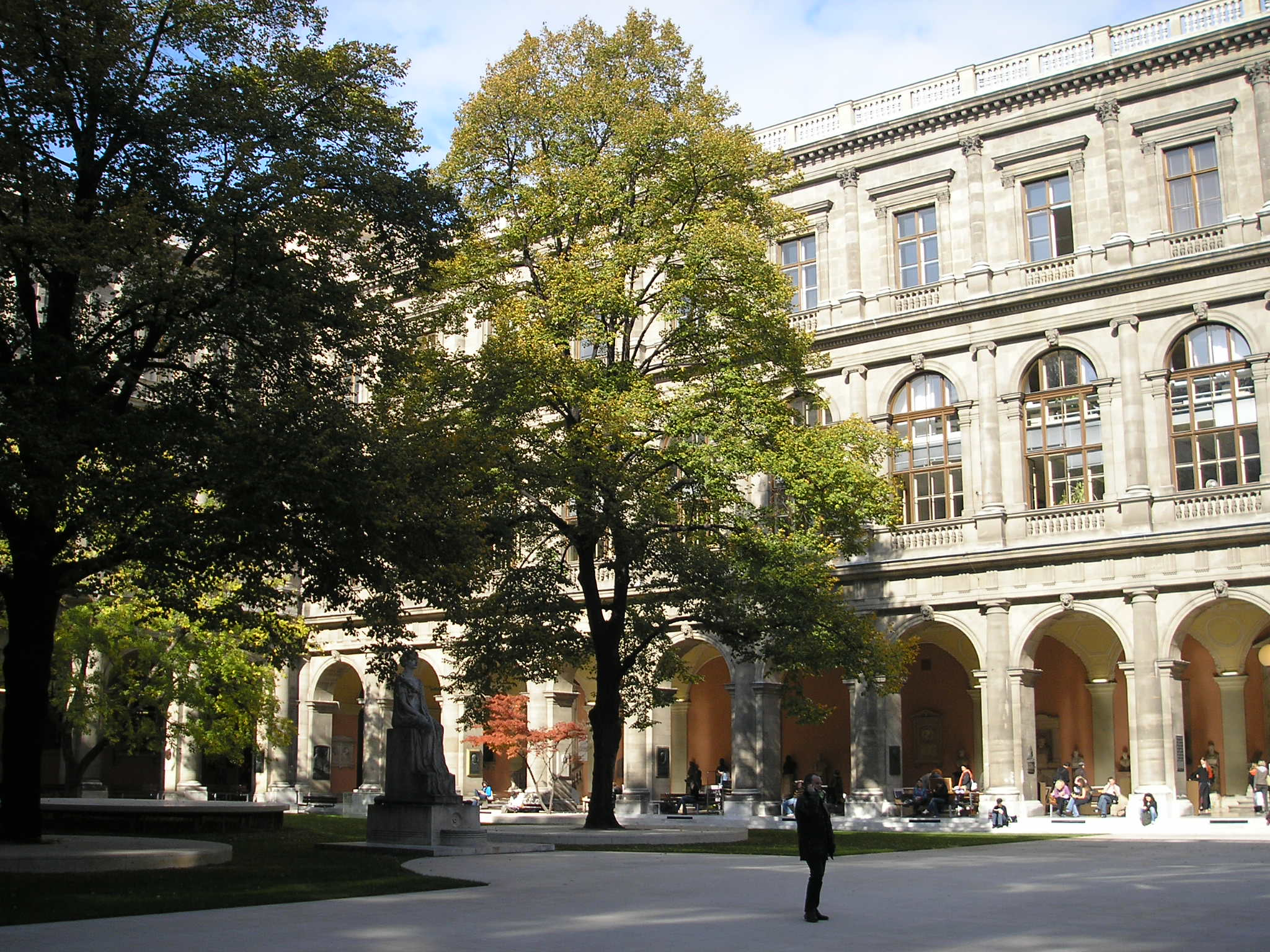
The Medical University of Vienna was the University of Vienna's faculty of medicine during 639 years before becoming a wholly independent university.

After the independence of the medical faculty as an independent institution the newly founded pure medical university could reposition itself in international research and regain international recognition. For example, in the fields of bionic reconstruction, some notable results could be achieved. A British soldier who lost his arm during the Afghanistan war received a bionic reconstruction at the department of surgery of the Vienna General Hospital. Furthermore, the Vienna General Hospital and Medical University of Vienna are the largest centre for lung transplantation in Europe and the second-largest lung transplantation centre worldwide after the University of Pittsburgh. Up until 2009, over 1,000 lung transplants had been performed and currently about 100 transplantations are carried out per year.

The Medical University of Vienna is the reference center of Siemens for the seven Tesla magnetic resonance imaging scanner "MAGNETOM 7T". Founded in 2003, the High Field MR Centre (HFMR) acts today as a core research facility for the Medical University of Vienna. It combines basic research and development of methods with a strong focus on applications in neuroscience, musculoskeletal research, oncology and metabolism. The declared goal is to validate the potential of ultra-high field (UHF) MRI in clinical applications.

== Programmes ==
Medical University of Vienna Study Programmes
Type	Requirements	Degree
Medicine	Both have a duration of 6 years and require higher education entrance qualification, i.e., Matura in Austria and Switzerland, Abitur in Germany or similar qualifications from other EU countries The language of instruction is German, but students are expected to be able to be fluent in English, and a diploma thesis written in German or English is required	"Dr. med. univ." for medical doctors and "Dr. med. dent." for dentists, corresponding to MD in the United States or MBBS or MBChB in the United Kingdom Graduates have the right to move freely within the European Union and to start speciality training
Dentistry	Both have a duration of 6 years and require higher education entrance qualification, i.e., Matura in Austria and Switzerland, Abitur in Germany or similar qualifications from other EU countries The language of instruction is German, but students are expected to be able to be fluent in English, and a diploma thesis written in German or English is required	"Dr. med. univ." for medical doctors and "Dr. med. dent." for dentists, corresponding to MD in the United States or MBBS or MBChB in the United Kingdom Graduates have the right to move freely within the European Union and to start speciality training
Medical informatics	It requires a bachelor's degree (Bologna Process) for the application	Master's degree
Applied medical science	They require a medical degree or similar; students of the university may start the PhD programme during the medical programme	Postdoc programmes
PhD	They require a medical degree or similar; students of the university may start the PhD programme during the medical programme	Postdoc programmes

== Faculty and alumni ==
The Medical University of Vienna, through its history as the University of Vienna's Faculty of Medicine, has a long history of teaching and research. Some of the personalities having taught and learned at the institution are included in the following lists.

=== Faculty ===
==== Nobel Prize recipients ====
Name	Year	Nobel Prize in	Awarded for	Field
Róbert Bárány	1914	Physiology or Medicine	"his work on the physiology and pathology of the vestibular apparatus"	Otorhinolaryngology
Julius Wagner-Jauregg	1927	Physiology or Medicine	"his discovery of the therapeutic value of malaria inoculation in the treatment of dementia paralytica"	Neurophysiology
Hans Fischer	1930	Chemistry	"for his researches into the constitution of haemin and chlorophyll and especially for his synthesis of haemin"	Natural products chemistry, Organic chemistry
Karl Landsteiner	1930	Physiology or Medicine	"his discovery of human blood groups"	Hematology
Otto Loewi	1936	Physiology or Medicine	"their discoveries relating to chemical transmission of nerve impulses" – jointly awarded with Sir Henry Hallett Dale	Neurophysiology
Richard Kuhn	1938	Chemistry	"his work on carotenoids and vitamins"	Natural products chemistry, Organic chemistry
Max Perutz	1962	Chemistry	"their studies of the structures of globular proteins" – awarded jointly with John Cowdery Kendrew	Biochemistry, Structural Chemistry

==== Notable faculty ====
Name	Lived	Fields	Known for
Gerard van Swieten	1700–1772	Medicine	being court physician to Empress Maria Theresia
Anton de Haen	1704–1776	Medicine	being one of the first physicians to make routine use of the thermometer in medicine, and perceived that temperature was a valuable indication of illness and health
Maximilian Stoll	1742–1787	Medicine	
Leopold Auenbrugger	1722–1809	Medicine	invented percussion as a diagnostic technique, because of the strength of this discovery considered one of the founders of modern medicine
Anton von Störck	1731–1803	Medicine	his clinical research of various herbs, and their associated toxicity and medicinal properties. His studies are considered to be the pioneering work of experimental pharmacology and his method can be regarded as forming a blueprint for the clinical trials of modern medicine
Johann Peter Frank	1745–1821	Hygiene, Public health	being credited as the first physician to describe clinical differences between diabetes mellitus and diabetes insipidus, also credited as one of the first thinkers of public Hygiene and of a social medical oriented health service
Johann Lucas Boër	1751–1835	Gynaecology, Obstetrics	established the field of obstetrics as an independent specialty
Georg Joseph Beer	1763–1821	Ophthalmology	introducing a flap operation for treatment of cataracts (Beer's operation), as well as popularizing the instrument used to perform the surgery (Beer's knife)
Carl von Rokitansky	1804–1878	physician, pathologist, humanist philosopher and liberal politician	Rokitansky's name is associated with the following diseases/morphologic features of disease: Superior Mesenteric Artery Syndrome; Müllerian agenesis (aka "Mayer-Rokitansky-Küster-Hauser syndrome"); Rokitansky's diverticulum; Rokitansky's triad (pulmonary stenosis); Rokitansky-Aschoff sinuses (in the gallbladder); Rokitansky-Cushing ulcer; Rokitansky-Maude Abbott syndrome; Von Rokitansky's syndrome; Rokitansky nodule – teratomas; Congenitally corrected transposition of the great arteries (levo-Transposition of the great arteries)
Theodor Billroth	1829–1894	founding father of modern abdominal surgery, amateur musician	first esophagectomy (1871), first laryngectomy (1873), and most famously, the first successful gastrectomy (1881) for gastric cancer, first describer of the Billroth II-operation (still in use today)
Sigmund Freud	1856–1939	neurologist, founder of psychoanalysis	creation of the field of psychoanalysis
Oskar Hirsch	1877–1965	otolaryngologist	pioneered transphenoidal surgery for pituitary gland surgery, together with Harvey Cushing laid the foundation for modern transsphenoidal surgery
Viktor Frankl	1905–1997	neurologist and psychiatrist, Holocaust survivor	founding the field logotherapy, which is a form of existential analysis, the "Third Viennese School of Psychotherapy"

== Museum ==
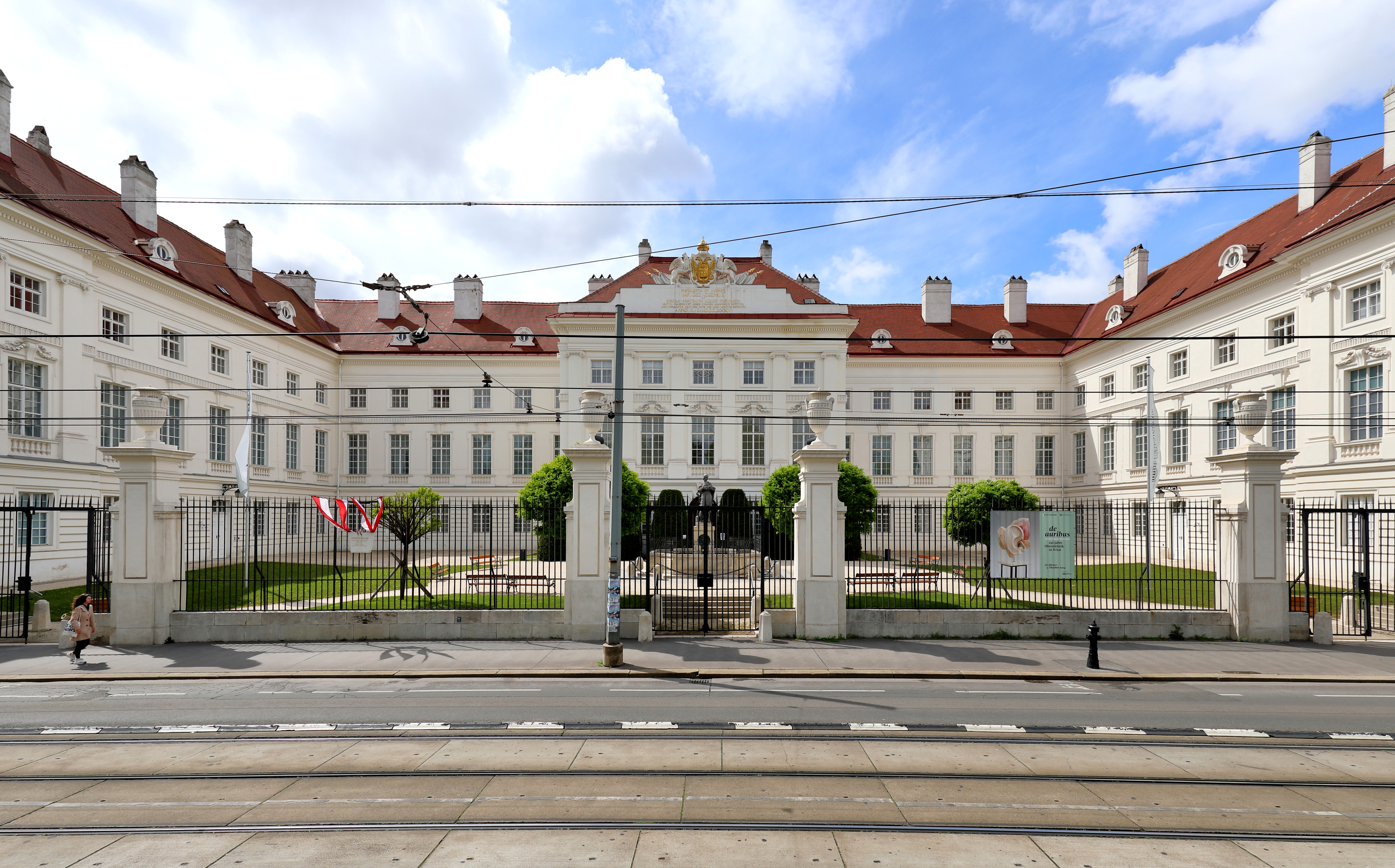
Museum for anatomical wax models

The Museum of the Medical University is mainly housed in the "Josephinum", designed and built in 1783–1785 to house the medical-surgical academy. The building includes a six-room collection of 1,192 wax anatomical and obstrectical models made in Florence by Clemente Susini under the supervision of Paolo Mascagni between 1784 and 1788.

The early-classicistic Josephinum was built in 1785 under Joseph II of Austria. It now houses the museum for anatomical wax models and, along with the Florentine Library, is among the largest in Europe.
