= Rokitansky =

Surname

Rokitansky is a surname. Notable people with the surname include:

- Carl von Rokitansky (1804–1878), Bohemian physician, pathologist, humanist philosopher and liberal politician
- Hans von Rokitansky (1835–1909), Austrian operatic bass who sang for three decades

== See also ==
- Rokitansky–Aschoff sinuses, pseudodiverticula or pockets in the wall of the gallbladder
- Mayer Rokitansky Kuster Hauser syndrome, congenital malformation characterized by a failure of the Müllerian duct to develop
- Rokitansky nodule, mass or lump in an ovarian teratomatous cyst
- Rokitansky-Cushing ulcer, gastric ulcer associated with elevated intracranial pressure
- Max Rockatansky, fictional character
