= Maximilian Stoll =

Austrian physician

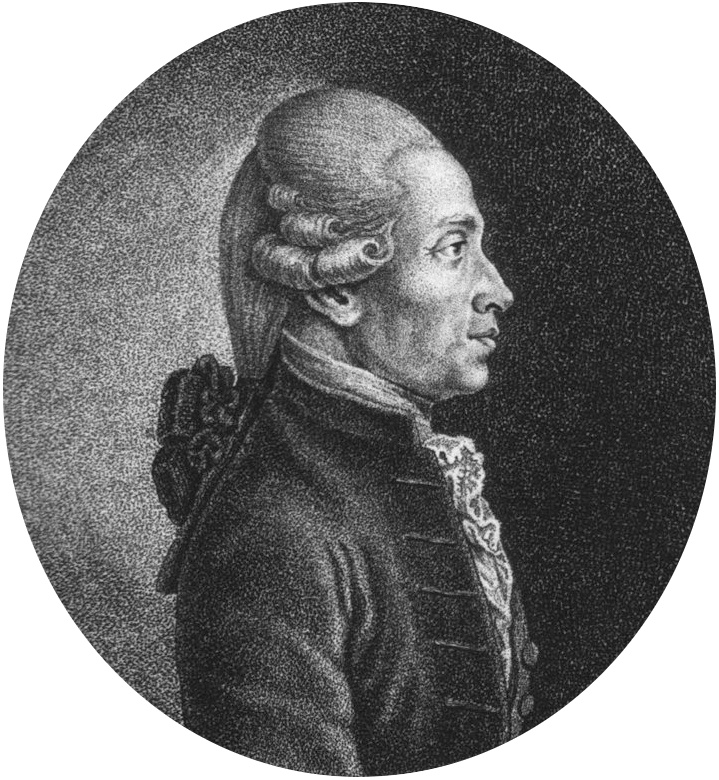
Maximilian Stoll

Maximilian Stoll (October 12, 1742 – May 25, 1787) was an Austrian physician who was a native of Erzingen, Baden-Württemberg.

Stoll originally trained as a theologian, with his interests later turning to medicine, and in 1776 attained a professorship at the University of Vienna. Soon afterwards, he succeeded Anton de Haen (1704–1776) at the Vienna clinic. In Vienna he worked closely with Leopold Auenbrugger (1722–1809) and Anton von Störck (1731–1803). One of Stoll's better known students was phrenologist Franz Joseph Gall (1758–1828).

Stoll is remembered for his epidemiological and systematic approach to medicine. He stressed the importance of knowing the clinical details of a patient's history, and installed a practice of keeping daily progress records of patients. He also developed a system of classifying diseases that was similar to the nosology of Thomas Sydenham (1624–1689). Stoll was one of the first practitioners of Auenbrugger's percussion methodology. In 1777 he is credited with providing the first description of gall bladder cancer.

Stoll was a popular lecturer, and is considered an important figure in the "Old Vienna School" of medicine, a group that included Auenbrugger, Störck, Gerard van Swieten (1700–1772), et al.

== Works ==
- Maximiliani Stoll Dissertatio de materia medica practica : opus postumum . [Augsburg] 1788 Digital edition by the University and State Library Düsseldorf
