= Pierre Adolphe Piorry =

French physician (1794–1879)

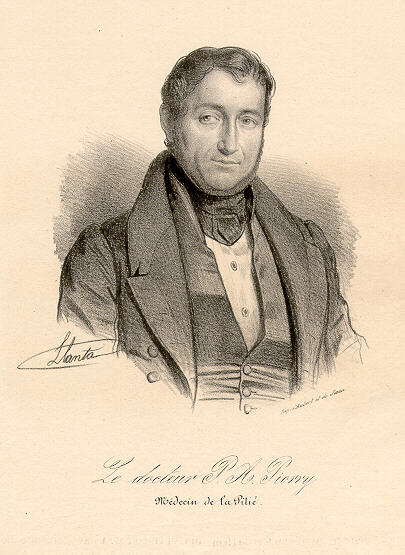
Pierre Adolphe Piorry

Pierre Adolphe Piorry (31 December 1794 – 29 May 1879) was a French medical doctor born in Poitiers. He invented pleximetry (a method for the investigation of internal organs using percussion) and was the creator of medical terms toxin, toxemia and septicemia.

== Biography ==
He studied medicine at the Université de France in Paris, where his instructors included Jean-Nicolas Corvisart, Gaspard Laurent Bayle, François Broussais, and François Magendie. While still a student he was part of the Napoleonic Wars in Spain. In 1816 he earned his doctorate with a thesis titled Du danger de la lecture des livres de médecine par les gens du monde (On the danger of reading medical text books by the laity).

He became a member of the Paris Medical Society on 2 March 1819, and was a member of the Académie Nationale de Médecine since its inception (1820).

He later became an esteemed professor of medicine at the Charité, Pitié, and Hôtel Dieu of Paris. In 1832 he was appointed to the Salpétrière, where he conducted clinical lectures.

René Laennec's invention of the stethoscope (1816) and his publication of De l' Auscultation Médiate (1819) inspired Piorry to make an analogous contribution to the science of medical percussion. In 1826 Piorry introduced the pleximeter (le plessimétre), a device used to help delineate internal organs, of which he described in his 1828 treatise De la Percussion Médiate.

He published works on numerous aspects of medicine, and had some success as a poet. One of his better known poems was Dieu, L'Ame et la Nature (1853).

Piorry thought that diabetics lose weight because of the amount of sugar they lose through urine. His suggestion was for diabetics to consume large quantities of sugar. His dangerous advice caused a death and was discredited as a diet treatment.

Piorry died in Paris.
