= Saverio Graziano =

Italian medical doctor (1702–1780)

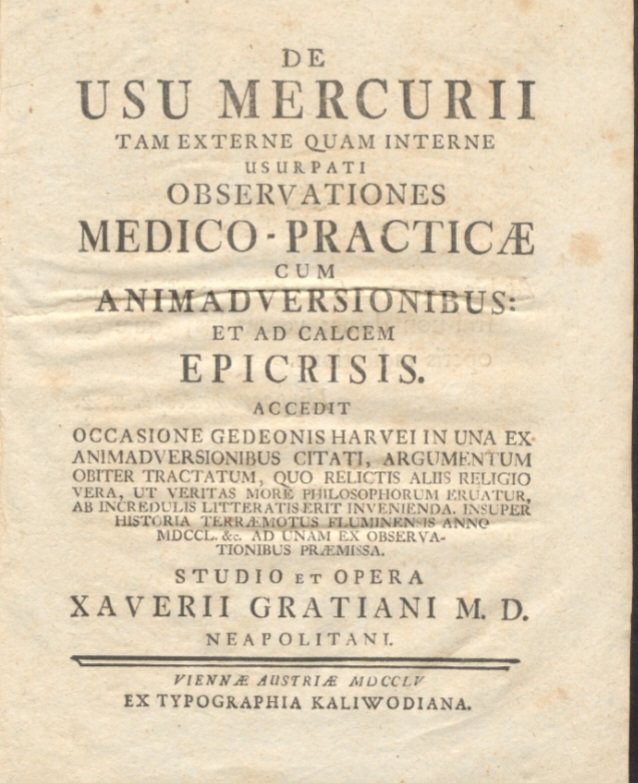
- “De Usi Mercuri…” is the only known work by Graziano
- Born: 1702; Barletta
- Died: 1780 (aged 77–78); Rijeka
- Scientific career
- Fields: physician

Saverio Graziano was an Italian medical doctor who lived in Rijeka.

Graziano born in Barletta, Kingdom of Naples, in 1702 into a very modest family of artisans. Toward the end of the 1730s, he settled in Rijeka or Fiume, a free port city of the Habsburg monarchy at the time. Graziano continued to practice medicine there. Diligent and upright, he founded a school of midwifery in the Croatian city and personally dedicated himself to combating infections. Graziano practiced forensic medicine, and was an obstetrician, gynecologist, infectologist and epidemiologist.

In the second half of the eighteenth century, he published in Austria a work on the scientific use of mercury, which was highly praised by Gerard van Swieten, the personal physician of Maria Theresa.

He became a citizen of Rijeka on November 11, 1768, and had eight children, four of whom were daughters. The Faculty of Medicine of Rijeka regards him as one of the founders of the city’s medical tradition, together with Giovanni Battista Cambieri.
