= Michael Kundi =

Michael Kundi (born 1950) was the head of the Institute of Environmental Health of the Medical University of Vienna, Austria. He has published over 200 articles in various scientific journals.

Kundi attended the University of Vienna where he studied Psychology, Medicine, and Mathematics and received a PhD in 1979.

In 1989, he received his habilitation in Epidemiology and Occupational Health from the Medical University of Vienna.
