= Crevenna =

Crevenna is the surname of the following persons:

- Alfredo B. Crevenna, Mexican film director
- Richard Crevenna, Austrian medicine and university professor
