= Hypoproteinemia =

Low protein concentration in the blood

- Specialty: Hematology

Hypoproteinemia is a condition where there is an abnormally low level of protein in the blood. There are several causes that all result in edema once serum protein levels fall below a certain threshold.

== Signs and symptoms ==
The severity of symptoms can vary, but may include:

1. Fatigue and weakness
2. Recurrent infections
3. Brittle nails and dry skin
4. Thinning and breaking hair
5. Mood changes and irritability
6. Curling ulcers

== Causes ==
1. Nutritional hypoproteinemia is due to severe limitation of protein intake in the diet. An example of nutritional hypoproteinemia is Kwashiorkor, a type of protein energy malnutrition affecting young children.
2. Malabsorption, often caused by celiac disease or inflammatory bowel disease
3. Liver disease can also cause hypoproteinemia by decreasing synthesis of plasma proteins like albumin.
4. Renal disease like nephrotic syndrome can also result in hypoproteinemia because plasma proteins are lost in the urine.
5. Sepsis (whole body infection) – macrophages activated in the liver and spleen secrete TNF-alpha into the bloodstream resulting in hypoproteinemia.

== Diagnosis ==
Hypoproteinemia is often confirmed by testing for serum albumin and total protein levels.
