= Richard Crevenna =

Austrian specialist for physical medicine

- Born: 17 October 1966 (age 59); Graz, Austria
- Known for: Cancer rehabilitation, interdisciplinary pain medicine and biofeedback
- Scientific career
- Fields: Physical medicine
- Workplaces: Medical University of Vienna

Richard Crevenna (born in Graz) is an Austrian medical specialist, Head of the Department of Physical Medicine, Rehabilitation and Occupational Medicine, Professor for physical medicine and a medical specialist for general rehabilitation with the special subject geriatrics, Pain Medicine, Geriatrics, and Occupational Medicine at the Medical University of Vienna (MUW). He is known for his basic work on cancer rehabilitation, interdisciplinary pain medicine and biofeedback.

== Biography ==
One of Crevenna's key research areas is oncologic rehabilitation, a field where he undertook substantive work in Austria and where his team trained the first patients under chemotherapy in Austria as well as the first patients with bone metastasis worldwide.

Other prioritized topics of Crevenna are physical medicine, rehabilitation, pain management and biofeedback as well as gender- and diversity aspects. All his studies were taken in an interdisciplinary and multi-professional cooperation.

Academic teaching and non-university teaching (contribution at the cancer school of the comprehensive cancer center, children university, university meets public) and the clinical patient care are further priorities and interests. At the MUW Crevenna is a member of the board for disabled people since 2014.

== Scientific contribution ==
Key areas of Crevenna's scientific and medical work comprise aspects of the so-called medical exercise therapy and especially of the interdisciplinary oncologic rehabilitation from the point of view of medical medicine and rehabilitation. The formation, implementation and management of an oncologic rehabilitation ambulance at the Universitätsklinik für Physikalische Medizin und Rehabilitation as well as the regularly coordination of an interdisciplinary and multi-professional tumor board for oncologic rehabilitation at the MUW (comprehensive cancer center), both bear witness of the growing and fundamental importance of the subject and also of the importance of an optimal, quality based and reliable interdisciplinary and multi-professional cooperation. Actual efforts are medical and organisational aspects at the formation of interdisciplinary offers for oncologic patients complementing the acute care.

Proof or counter-proof of traditional contraindication in the physical medicine are also an important part of his research efforts. Examples are the application of different forms of the electrotherapy at recipients of electronic implants or at oncologic patients.

Another fixed point are Crevenna's efforts for the method biofeedback, especially for its medical indication. Crevenna could improve the acceptance of this method under medical practitioners. As president of the Österreichische Gesellschaft für Biofeedback und Psychophysiologie, ÖBFP, Crevenna integrated biofeedback into the curriculum of the MUW, which improved the acceptance of the method under medical practitioners.

The formation and management of the first university special ambulance for oncologic rehabilitation and for medical training and medical training therapy as well as the implementation of the first tumor board for oncologic rehabilitation worldwide (comprehensive cancer center) are significant progresses in the interdisciplinary approach of Crevenna's discipline. The results were enabled through the scientific efforts of his team and through the acceptance and support in the interdisciplinary cooperation.

== Academic memberships ==
- Working group cancer rehabilitation of the Austrian ministry of health
- President of the Österreichische Gesellschaft für Biofeedback und Psychophysiologie (ÖBFP) since 2008
- Vicepresident of the Österreichischen Akademie für onkologische Rehabilitation und Psychoonkologie (ÖARP) since 2009
- Head of unit for "Wissenschaft und Forschung" and "Biofeedback" of the Österreichische Gesellschaft für Physikalische Medizin und Rehabilitation (ÖGPMR)
- Extended board, auditor Österreichische Gesellschaft für geschlechtsspezifische Medizin (ÖGGSM)
- Comprehensive Cancer Center Vienna
- Österreichische Gesellschaft für Akupunktur (ÖGA)
- Österreichische Ärztekammer (ÖÄK)
- Scientific board of the Gesellschaft der Ärzte (Billrothhaus) (College of Physicians Vienna. Billrothaus )
- Member of the board, advisory board of Österreichische Lymphliga (ÖLL)
- Extended board, auditor of Verein zur Förderung von Wissenschaft und Forschung in den neuen Universitätskliniken am Allgemeinen Krankenhaus Wien (VFVF)
- Scientific advisory board of Österreichische Krebshilfe Wien

== Editorial Boards ==
- European Journal of Cancer Care
- Journal of Oncology
- Rehabilitation in Research and Practice
- Physikalische Medizin – Rehabilitationsmedizin – Kurortmedizin
- Disability and Rehabilitation
