= Auenbrugger's sign =

- Differential diagnosis: Pericardial effusion

Auenbrugger's sign is a bulging of the epigastrium seen in cases of severe pericardial effusion. It is often not spotted because pericardial effusion can be caught on echocardiography before it progresses this far. It is named after Joseph Leopold Auenbrugger.
