= Hans von Rokitansky =

Austrian opera singer

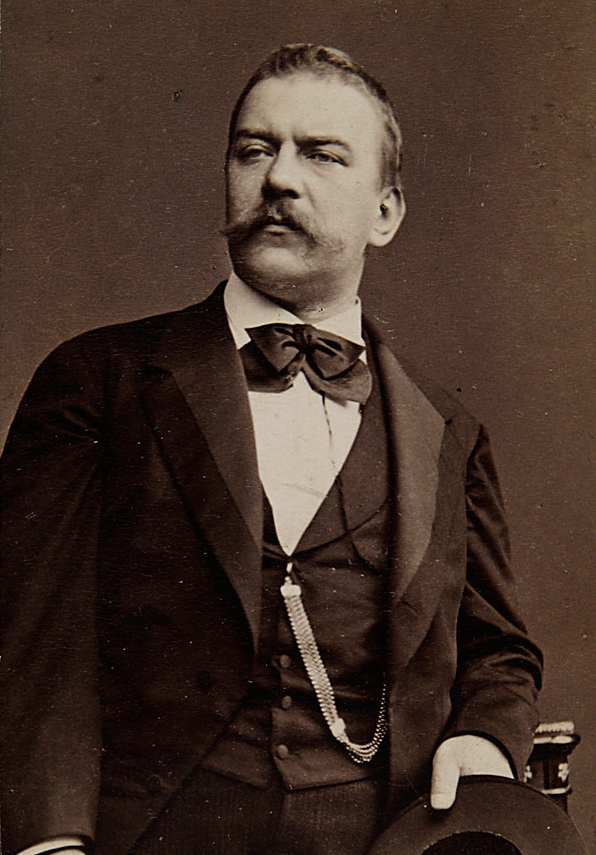

Baron Hans von Rokitansky (German: Hans Freiherr von Rokitansky) (8 March 1835 – 2 November 1909) was an Austrian operatic bass who sang for three decades at the Vienna Hofoper (now Vienna State Opera) and in concerts and operas throughout Europe between 1856 and 1877.

He performed a wide repertoire that encompassed French grand opera, Italian bel canto opera, the German operas of Richard Wagner, and the works of Wolfgang Amadeus Mozart. He possessed a deep resonant voice which remained clear until the very end of his career when his intonation began to suffer somewhat.

After retiring in 1893, he became a singing teacher at the Vienna Conservatory and many of his pupils went on to have successful opera careers.

== Life and career ==
Hans Freiherr von Rokitansky was born in Vienna, the son of Baron Carl von Rokitansky who was a famous physician and natural scientist. Hans's younger brother Baron Victor von Rokitansky (1836–1896), also became a successful opera singer and a composer. He later married Therese Lablache, a soprano and the daughter of the famous operatic bass Luigi Lablache.

Rokitansky studied music in Paris, Bologna, and Milan before making his professional singing début in an 1856 concert in London. The following year he made his first appearance on the operatic stage as Oroveso in Bellini's Norma at the Théâtre Italien in Paris. In 1862 he joined the roster at the National Theatre in Prague where his first role was Cardinal Brogny in Fromental Halévy's La Juive. He left Prague in 1864 to join the Vienna Hofoper where he sang roles for the next twenty-nine years. His many roles at that house included Giorgio in Bellini's I puritani, Leporello in Mozart's Don Giovanni, Sarastro in Mozart's The Magic Flute, Bertram in Meyerbeer's Robert le diable, the title role in Verdi's Fiesco, Caspar in Weber's Der Freischütz, the Landgrave in Wagner's Tannhäuser, and King Henry in Wagner's Lohengrin among others. He also notably portrayed both the High priest and the Guardian of the temple in the world premiere of Karl Goldmark's Die Königin von Saba in 1875.

In addition to performing in Vienna, Rokitansky periodically performed in operas and concerts in throughout Europe. He appeared in operas at Her Majesty's Theatre in London in 1865 and in 1866, notably singing Osmin in a revival of Mozart's Die Entführung aus dem Serail. He also appeared in London performances in 1876-1877 and appeared in operas in Florence, Milan, Turin, and Bologna during the 1860s and 1870s.

After leaving the Vienna Hofoper in 1893, Rokitansky taught singing at the Vienna Conservatory for more than a decade. His younger brother Victor, also a successful opera singer and a composer, had taught at the conservatory previously from 1871 through 1880. Several of Hans's students went on to have successful opera careers, including Franz Xaver Battisti and Therese Boschetti. Hans retired to Schloss Laubegg, Styria where he died on 2 November 1909.
