= Leopold Auenbrugger =

Austrian physician

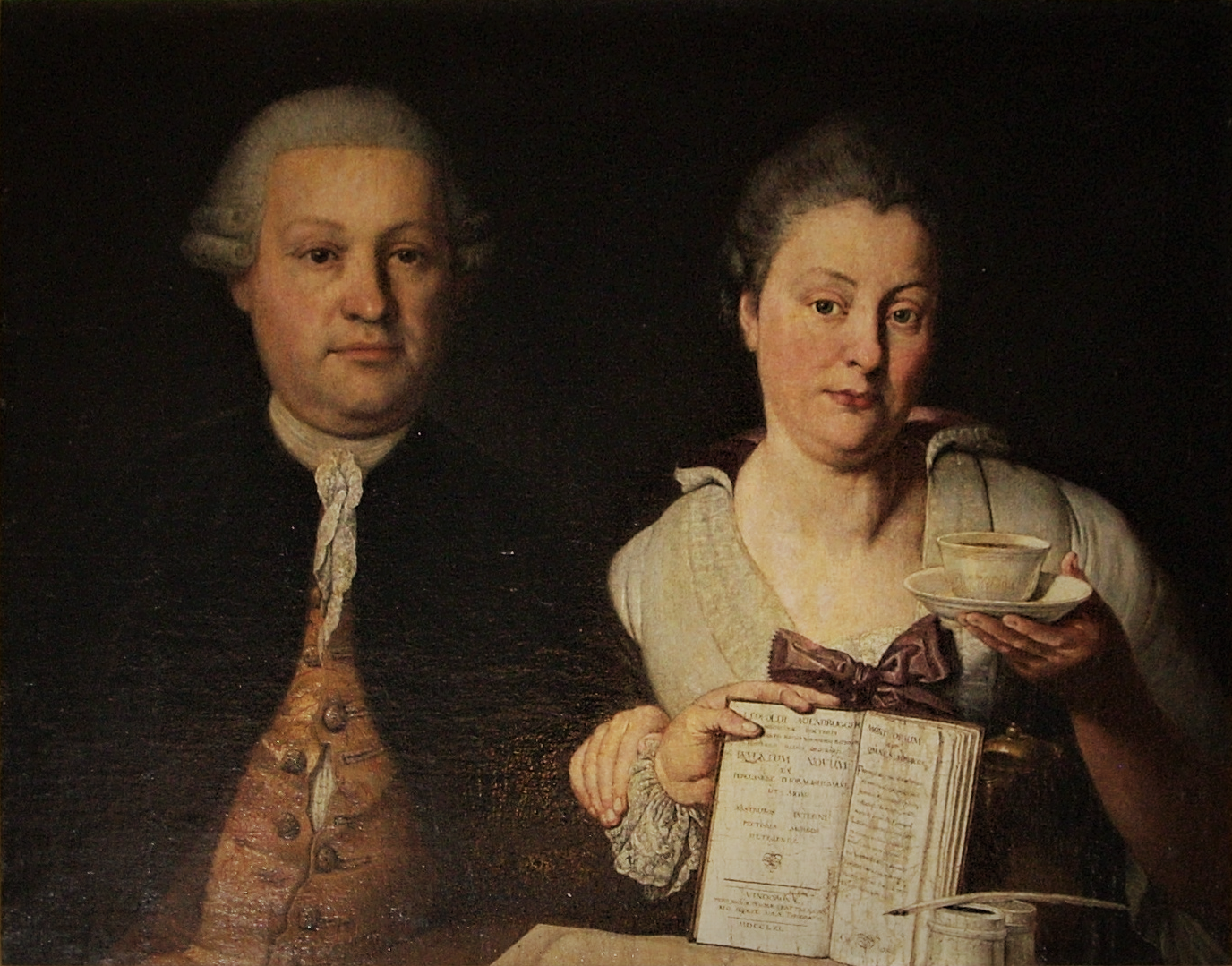
- Leopold Auenbrugger and his wife Marianne
- Born: 19 November 1722; Graz, Duchy of Styria
- Died: 17 May 1809 (aged 86); Vienna, Austrian Empire
- Known for: percussion (medicine)
- Scientific career
- Fields: medicine

Josef Leopold Auenbrugger or Avenbrugger (19 November 1722 – 17 May 1809), also known as Leopold von Auenbrugger, was an Austrian physician who invented percussion as a diagnostic technique. On the strength of this discovery, he is considered one of the founders of modern medicine.

== Biography ==
Auenbrugger was a native of Graz in Styria, an Austrian province. His father, owner of the inn Zum Schwarzen Mohren, gave his son every opportunity for an excellent preliminary education in his native town and then sent him to Vienna to complete his studies at the university. Auenbrugger was graduated as a physician at the age of 22 and then entered the Spanish Military Hospital of Vienna, where he spent 10 years.

He found out that, by applying his ear to the patient and tapping lightly on the chest, one could assess the density of underlying tissues and organs. This technique of percussive diagnosis had its origins in testing the level of wine casks in the cellar of his father's hotel. With this method, he was able to plot outlines of the heart. It was the first time that a physician could relatively accurately and objectively determine an important sign of diseases. He published his findings in a booklet, but nobody paid much attention to it.

During his ten years of patient study, Auenbrugger confirmed his observations on the diagnostic value of percussion by comparison with post-mortem specimens, and besides made a number of experimental researches on dead bodies. He injected fluid into the pleural cavity, and showed that it was perfectly possible by percussion to tell exactly the limits of the fluid present, and thus to decide when and where efforts should be made for its removal.

His name is also associated with Auenbrugger's sign, a bulging of the epigastric region, in cases of large effusions of the pericardium, the membrane which envelops the heart.

His later studies were devoted to tuberculosis. He pointed out how to detect cavities of the lungs, and how their location and size might be determined by percussion. He also recognized that information with regard to the contents of cavities in the lungs and conditions of lung tissue might be obtained by placing the hand on the chest and noting the vibration, or fremitus, produced by the voice and breath. These observations were published in a little book called Inventum Novum ex Percussione Thoracis Humani Interni Pectoris Morbos Detegendi, the full English title being "A New Discovery that Enables the Physician from the Percussion of the Human Thorax to Detect the Diseases Hidden Within the Chest". It is considered a book that marks an epoch in the modern history of medicine.

Like most medical discoveries, Auenbrugger's method of diagnosis at first met with indifference. Before his death, however, it had aroused the attention of French physician René Laennec, who, following up the ideas suggested by it, discovered auscultation. The value of percussion in physical examination was later recognized by Jean-Nicolas Corvisart, who popularized it teaching it to his students in France, and by Joseph Škoda in Vienna. He also translated and illustrated Auenbrugger's book in 1808, which helped to make Auenbrugger's work on percussion better known.

Auenbrugger lived to the age of 86. He was especially noted for his cordial relations with the younger members of his profession and for his kindness to the poor and to those suffering from tuberculosis. He is sometimes said to have died in the typhus epidemic of 1798, but he actually died over a decade later.

Auenbrugger's daughters, Marianna and Katerina, were composers and Marianna was a pupil of Antonio Salieri.

== Notes ==
- Herbermann, Charles, ed. (1913). "Leopold Auenbrugger" . Catholic Encyclopedia. New York: Robert Appleton Company.
