= Rokitansky nodule =

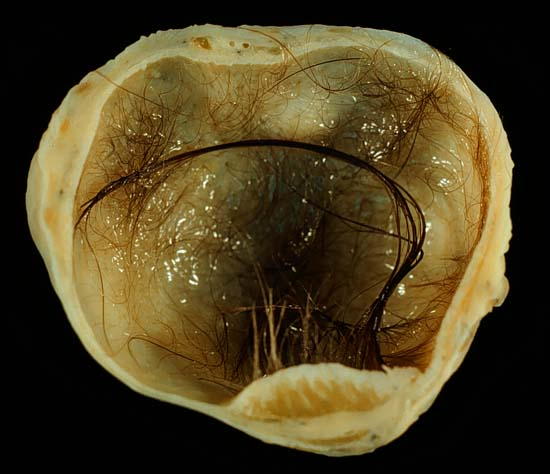
A cystic teratoma with a small Rokitansky nodule — region of thickened cyst wall (bottom part of image).

In gynecology, a Rokitansky nodule is a mass or lump in an ovarian teratomatous cyst.

== See also ==
- Baron Carl von Rokitansky
- Rokitansky-Aschoff sinuses
