= Curling's ulcer =

Damage to the stomach lining due to severe burns

- Other names: Curling ulcer
- Specialty: General surgery, Gastroenterology

Curling's ulcer is an acute gastric erosion resulting as a complication from severe burns when reduced plasma volume leads to ischemia and cell necrosis (sloughing) of the gastric mucosa. The condition was first described in 1823 and named after Thomas Blizard Curling, who observed ten such cases in 1842.

These stress ulcers (actually shallow multiple erosions) were once a common complication of serious burns, presenting in over 10% of cases, and especially common in child burn victims. They result in perforation and hemorrhage more often than other forms of intestinal ulceration and had correspondingly high mortality rates (at least 80%).

== Treatment ==
While emergency surgery was once the only treatment, combination therapies including enteral feeding with powerful antacids such as H_{2}-receptor antagonists or, more recently, proton pump inhibitors such as omeprazole have made Curling's ulcer a rare complication.

== See also ==
- Cushing ulcer
