= Anton de Haen =

Dutch physician

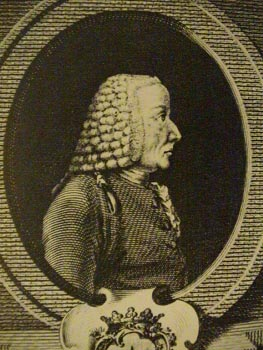
Anton de Haen

Anton de Haen (The Hague December 8, 1704 – Vienna September 5, 1776) was a Dutch physician who worked in Vienna as a professor at the University of Vienna and was the director of its medical department. He became a very influential physician in the Habsburg monarchy and eventually founded the Viennese Medicine School.

He studied medicine in Leiden under Hermann Boerhaave, and in 1754 went to the University of Vienna, where he became head of its medical clinic. He is remembered for teaching students at the bedside of patients.

At Vienna, Anton de Haen was an associate to Gerard van Swieten, whom he worked with in the establishment of structured medical classes. He was an advocate of post-mortem investigations, as well as maintaining detailed case histories of patients. He was one of the first physicians to make routine use of the thermometer in medicine, and perceived that temperature was a valuable indication of illness and health.

Among his written works was Ratio medendi in nosocomio practico, of which 18th century Viennese hospital practices and case histories are discussed. This treatise also described one of the earliest known cases of amenorrhea associated with a pituitary tumor.

== Works ==
- Aletophilorum quorundam Viennensium elucidatio necessaria Epistolae de cicuta . J. Th. von Trattner, [S.l.]; Vindobonae 1766 Digital edition by the University and State Library Düsseldorf
