= Spanish Military Hospital of Vienna =

Former hospital in Vienna

Coordinates: 48°13′21.7″N 16°21′22″E

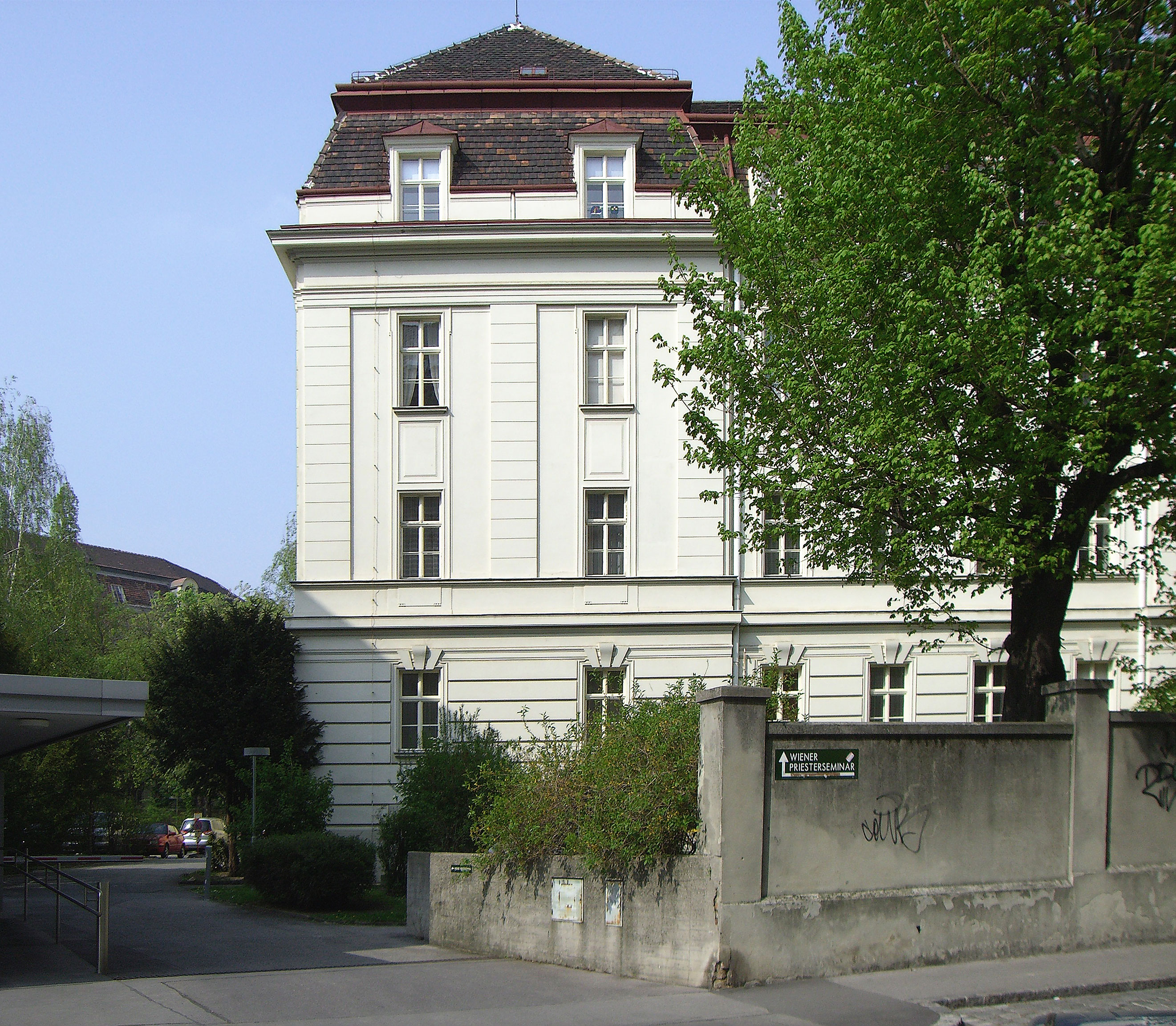
The former hospital building.

The Spanish Military Hospital of Vienna was an early hospital in Vienna, founded in 1717 by Charles VI, Holy Roman Emperor and located at what is now 9-9a Boltzmanngasse in the Alsergrund district. Since 1 April 2003 the building has been a protected monument. Since 2014 it has been being remodelled under the leadership of regent Richard Tatzreiter to accommodate the clergy seminaries of the Roman Catholic dioceses of Vienna, Eisenstadt and Sankt Pölten.

== History ==
It was founded for the relatives of Charles's newly acquired territories in Sicily, Milan, Naples and the Spanish Netherlands and the Spaniards who had followed him to Vienna. On 28 December 1717 Stephan Mascaro, Mauritius Andreu, Gabriel Joly Orso and Nicolaus Sardagna took on a purchase contract for a piece of land with a building already on it which had previously been used as a hospital during a plague in 1713. That building was demolished and work on a new building began on 12 February 1718.

== Bibliography ==
- (in German) Carl Hofbauer: Die Alservorstadt mit den ursprünglichen Besitzungen der Benediktinerabtei Michelbeuern am Wildbache Als – historisch-topographische Skizzen zur Schilderung der Vorstädte Wiens, Wien, 1861
- (in German) Felix Czeike: Historisches Lexikon Wien. Band 1: A–Da. Kremayr & Scheriau, Wien 1992, ISBN 3-218-00543-4.
- (in German) Universitätsprofessor Doktor Kurt Keminger: Das Kropfspital in Rudolfsheim – Kaiserin-Elisabeth-Spital 1890 – 1990, Verlag für medizinische Wissenschaften Wilhelm Maudrich, Wien, ISBN 3-85175-529-4
