= Pleximeter =

Medical device

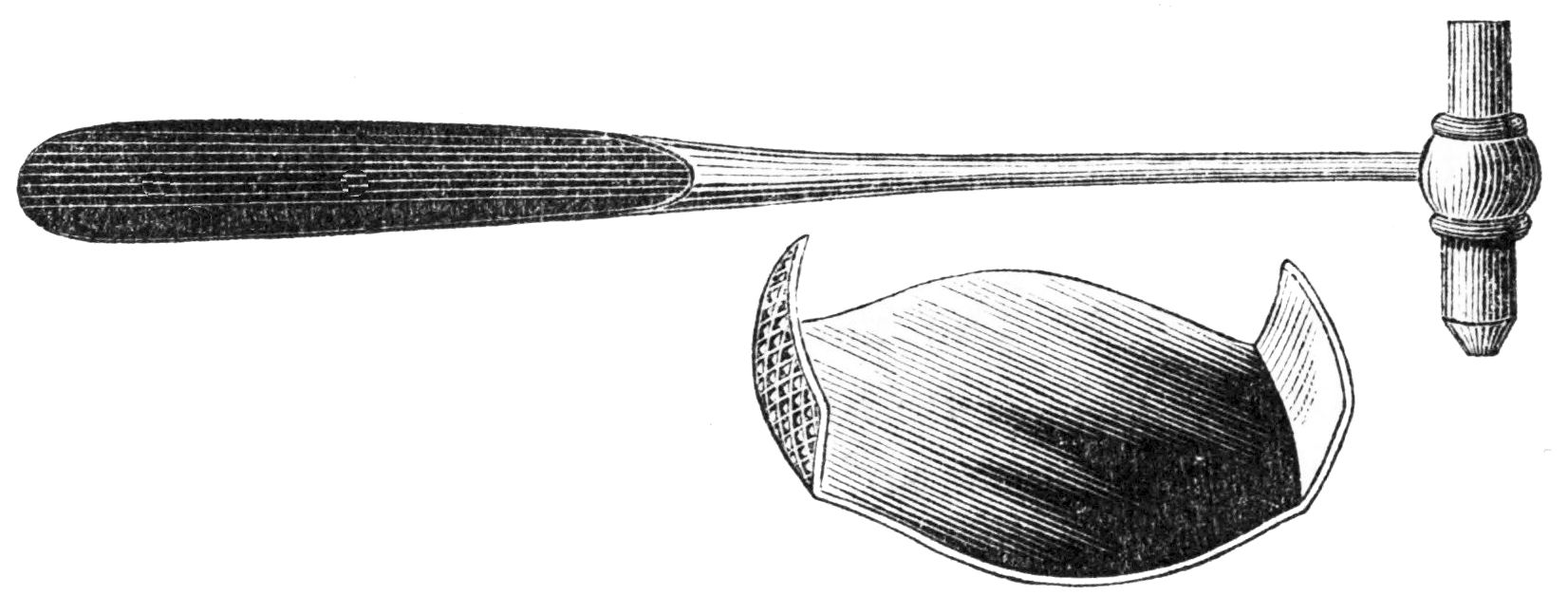
Plexor and pleximeter

A Pleximeter is a device used in medical percussion, as part of a clinical examination, to absorb the energy generated by the strike from the plexor.

During percussion the middle finger of examiner's hand is routinely used as pleximeter. The finger of the examiner's left hand is firmly applied to the chest wall so as to displace any air between it and the chest wall and the plexor strikes on the middle phalanx of the pleximeter. It can also be an instrument made of wood, ivory, or other hard substances.
