= Cushing ulcer =

- Specialty: General surgery

A Cushing ulcer, named after Harvey Cushing, is a gastric ulcer associated with elevated intracranial pressure. It is also called von Rokitansky–Cushing syndrome. Apart from the stomach, ulcers may also develop in the proximal duodenum and distal esophagus.

== Causes ==
The mechanism of development of Cushing ulcers is thought to be due to direct stimulation of vagal nuclei as a result of increased intracranial pressure. Brain tumors, traumatic head injury, and other intracranial processes including infections, can cause increased intracranial pressure and lead to overstimulation of the vagus nerve. Efferent fibers of the vagus nerve then release acetylcholine onto gastric parietal cell M_{3} receptors, causing insertion of hydrogen potassium ATPase vesicles into the apical plasma membrane. The end result is increased secretion of gastric acid with eventual ulceration of the gastric mucosa.

== Diagnosis ==
As Cushing ulcers have a higher incidence of developing after shock, sepsis or trauma, diagnosis should include recent medical history evaluation. Both endoscopy and angiography can be used to locate the lesion or ulcer, though endoscopy is more commonly used as a first-line diagnosis procedure.

== Treatment ==
Most episodes of Cushing ulceration resolve on medical intervention, consisting primarily of rinsing the area with saline and the administration of antacids.

== See also ==
- Curling ulcer
