= Anton von Störck =

Austrian pharmacologist (1731–1803)

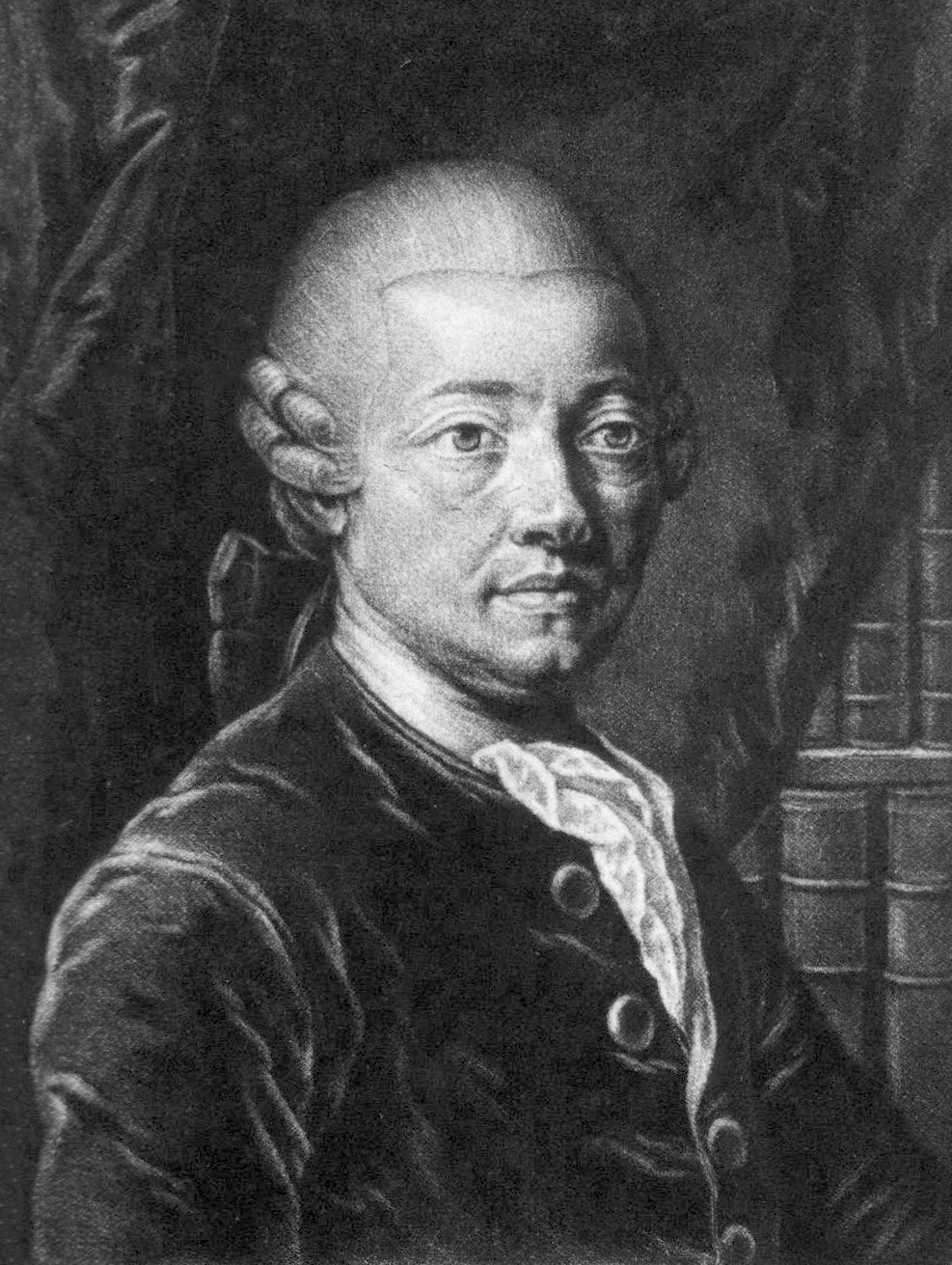
- Born: 21 February 1731; Saulgau
- Died: 11 February 1803 (aged 71); Vienna
- Education: University of Vienna (M.D., 1757)
- Known for: Research into herbs
- Scientific career
- Fields: Physician
- Workplaces: University of Vienna
- Thesis: De conceptu, partu naturali, difficili, et praeternaturali (1757)
- Doctoral advisor: Gerard van Swieten
- Doctoral students: Joseph Barth

Anton von Störck (21 February 1731 – 11 February 1803) was an Austrian physician who was a native of Saulgau in Upper Swabia.

== Biography ==
Both of Störck's parents died when he was young, and he spent his early years as an orphan in a Viennese poorhouse. He studied medicine under Gerard van Swieten and received his medical doctorate from the University of Vienna in 1757. He rose through the academic ranks at the University of Vienna, and would later become deacon of the medical faculty and rector at the university. In 1767 he treated empress Maria Theresa of Austria for smallpox, and after her recovery he became her personal physician.

Störck is remembered for his clinical research of various herbs, and their associated toxicity and medicinal properties. His studies are considered to be the pioneering work of experimental pharmacology and his method can be regarded as forming a blueprint for the clinical trials of modern medicine. He was convinced that plants regarded as poisonous still had medicinal applications if employed in carefully controlled quantities. Störck was particularly interested in the medical possibilities of plants such as hemlock, henbane, jimsonweed and autumn crocus. His experiments with these plants involved a three-step process; initially used on animals, followed by a personal trial, and finally given to his patients, all the while maintaining a "sliding-scale" approach to determine the optimum dosage.

In 1758, Störck became 'first physician' to the Vienna urban institute for the poor. From 1764 he was physician to Emperor Franz I. Stephan of Frankfurt am Maine and the Dukes Joseph and Leopold. He was a member of numerous European scientific societies and was made a Baron in 1775. His brother Matthias, also a doctor, became 'body physician' to the Grand Duke of Toskana and was also made a Baron in 1779. Störck's numerous Latin medical tracts, detailing his experiments into the therapeutic effects of poisonous plants, excited great interest and were translated into German, French, English, Dutch and Portuguese, rapidly becoming influential medical texts throughout Europe.

== Publications ==
- An essay on the medicinal nature of Hemlock . Nourse, London 1760 Digital edition by the University and State Library Düsseldorf
- Libellus, quo demonstratur: cicutam non solum usu interno tutissime exhiberi, sed et esse simul remedium valde utile in multis morbis, qui hucusque curatu impossibiles dicebantur, Vienna, 1760 (Translation: A little book which shows Hemlock not only safe for internal use, but also at the same time a very useful medicine in many diseases which up to this time are declared as impossible to cure) Digital edition by the University and State Library Düsseldorf
- Supplementum necessarium de cicuta . Trattner, Vindobonae 1761 Digital edition by the University and State Library Düsseldorf
- Libellus, quo demonstratur: stramonium, hyosciamum, aconitum non solum tuto posse exhiberi usu interno hominibus, verum et ea esse remedia in multis morbis maxime salutifera, Vienna, 1762 (Translation: A little book which shows Stramonium, Hyoscyamus and Aconite not only showing them safe for internal human use, certainly, and at the same time as medicines having great healing power in many diseases) (Digital edition by the University and State Library Düsseldorf)
- Libellus, quo demonstratur: Colchici autumnalis radicem non solum tuto posse exhiberi hominibus, sed et ejus usu interno curari quandoque morbos difficillimos, qui aliis remediis non ceduntdicem, Vienna: J. T. Trattner, 1763 (Translation: A little book which shows Colchicum autumnale (Meadow Saffron) root not only safe for human use, but also useful for internal cures whenever diseases, difficult to cure, will not yield to other medicines)
- Libellus, quo continuantur experimenta et observationes circa nova sua medicamenta, Vienna: J T Trattner, 1765, 1769 (Translation: A little book of continuing experiments and observations about my new medicines)
- Libellus, quo demonstratur: Herbam veteribus dictam flammulam Jovis posse tuto et magna cum utilitate exhiberi aegrotantibus, 1769: Deutsch von S. Schintz, Zürich 1764 (Translation: A little book which shows that ancient herb called Jove's little flame (Clematis erecta), can be used without risk showing great usefulness for the sick)
- Zwo Abhandlungen vom Nutzen und Gebrauch des Brennkrauts und des weißen Dyptam (aus dem Lateinischen), Nürnberg 1769 (Translation: Two papers on the use and serviceability of the Snowdrop tree (Acalypha) and The Burning Bush (Dictamnus albus) from the Latin, Nuremberg, 1769) Digital edition by the University and State Library Düsseldorf
- Libellus de usu medico Pulsatillae nigricantis, Vienna 1771; German edition, Frankfurt und Leipzig 1771 (Translation: A little book on the medical uses of the wind flower, Pulsatilla nigricans)
- Medicinisch-praktischer Unterricht für die Feld und Landwundärzte der österreichischen Staaten, 2 vols. Vienna: J T Trattner 1776, 1786, 1789; in Latin. von J. M. Schosulan, 1777, 1784, 1791; in Dutch, Rotterdam 1787 (Translation: Practical medical lessons for field and land surgeons of the Austrian states) Digital edition by the University and State Library Düsseldorf
- Praecepta medico-practica in usum chirurgorum castrensium et ruralium ditionum austriacarum, Vienna: Rudolph Graeffer, 1777, pp. 586 (Translation: A teaching on medical practice and the uses of surgery at the imperial court and in the country districts of Austria) (Digital edition from 1784) / (Digital edition from 1791 by the University and State Library Düsseldorf)
- Pharmacopoea Austriaco – provincialis emendata, 1794 (Translation: Lesser corrections to the Austrian pharmacopoea)
