= Carl von Rokitansky =

Austrian pathologist and philosopher (1804–1878)

Baron Carl von Rokitansky
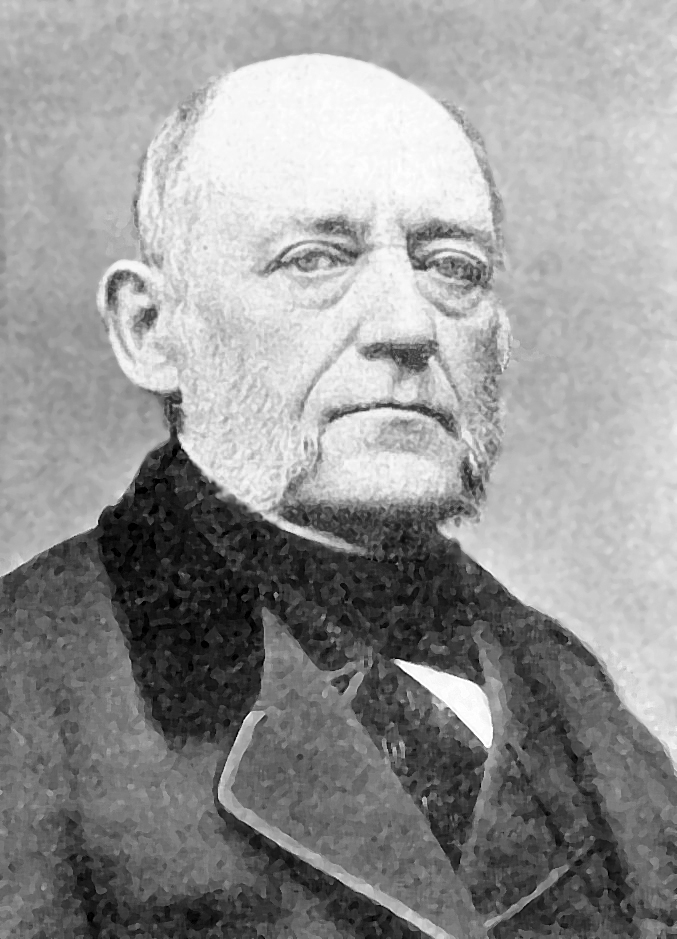
- Baron Carl von Rokitansky
- Born: 19 February 1804; Hradec Králové, Bohemia, Habsburg monarchy
- Died: 23 July 1878 (aged 74); Vienna, Austria-Hungary
- Education: University of Vienna
- Scientific career
- Fields: Medical doctor, pathologist

Baron Carl von Rokitansky (German: Carl Freiherr von Rokitansky, Czech: Karel Rokytanský; 19 February 1804 – 23 July 1878) was an Austrian medical doctor, pathologist, humanist philosopher and liberal politician, founder of the Viennese School of Medicine of the 19th century. He was the founder of science-based diagnostics, connecting clinical with pathological results in a feedback loop that is standard practice today but was daring in Rokitansky's day.

== Early life ==
Carl Joseph Wenzel Prokop Rokitansky, usually known as Carl Rokitansky, was born in Hradec Králové (German: Königgrätz), in the Kingdom of Bohemia, then part of the Habsburg monarchy and an imperial state of the Holy Roman Empire. His father Prokop Rokitansky (1771–1813) was a civil servant in Leitmeritz. His mother Theresia (1772–1827) was the daughter of Václav Lodgman Ritter von Auen, the first regional commissioner of Hradec Králové. Carl was the eldest of four children (Prokop, Marie, Theresie). Due to the early death of his father († 1812), Carl and his siblings grew up in straitened circumstances. Despite this, his mother made sure that he attended grammar school in Hradec Králové and made it possible for him to study at the Charles University in Prague. Rokitansky described his upbringing as very liberal. Rokitansky remembered his father, as having been very widely read and erudite. For this reason, Rokitansky originally intended to study classical philology at the University of Prague.

== University studies ==
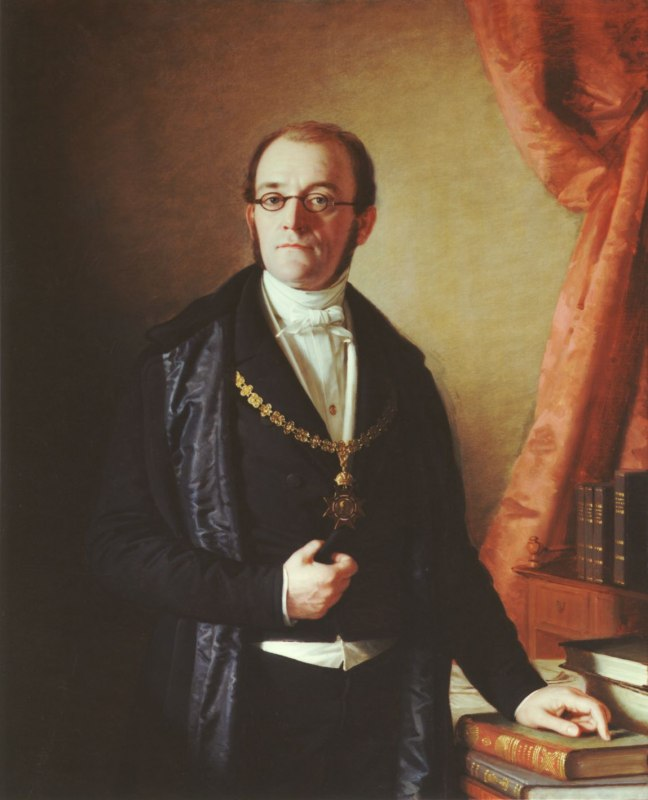
Carl von Rokitansky as rector of Vienna University

Rokitansky began university in 1818 with the obligatory philosophical propaedeutics. Some of his classes were taught by the philosopher Bernardo Bolzano (1771–1848), who was to have a lasting influence on his political and social ideas. However, in 1821 he decided to study medicine in Prague. In 1824 he moved to Vienna to live with his uncle Lodgman von Auen and to continue his medical studies at the University of Vienna. In 1827 he began his research at the Pathological-Anatomical Prosecture at the Vienna General Hospital. His first complete autopsy report is dated 23 October 1827. He obtained his doctorate in medicine from the University of Vienna on 6 March 1828. His doctoral thesis was entitled "De Varioloide Vaccinica", and was a study of the smallpox vaccination, as he had very early on developed an interest in serology.

== Medical career ==
From 3 January 1827 onwards Rokitansky began working at the Pathological-Anatomical Prosecture as an unpaid assistant, as can be seen from some of his early autopsy protocols. 1832 he was appointed interim director of the Pathological-Anatomical Prosecture and in 1834 became Extraordinary Professor for Pathological Anatomy at the University of Vienna and Curator of the Pathological-Anatomical Museum.

First chair for pathological anatomy in the German-speaking world:

In 1844 he was appointed to the first chair for pathological anatomy in the German-speaking world and in the years 1849/50, 1856/57, 1859/60, and 1862/63 served as Dean of the Faculty of Medicine. In 1852/53 academic year he was the first freely-elected rector of the University of Vienna.

== Pathologist ==
New Viennese School

The 1830s saw the emergence of the New Viennese School that was based on the new scientific methods established by Carl Rokitansky. In the 20th century, this became known as the Second Viennese School of Medicine. Other well-known proponents besides Rokitansky were the clinician Josef Škoda and the dermatologist Ferdinand Ritter von Hebra. However, contemporary students such as Sigmund Freud described themselves until well into the 20th century as students of the New Viennese School and regarded Rokitansky as a father figure, calling him "Vater Roki". The New Viennese School sought to introduce a new system of science-based medicine. Until then, pathology had been a purely descriptive science that was disconnected from clinical practice. While contemporary pathologists, such as Gabriel Andral and Jean Frédéric Lobstein, compiled autopsy reports containing descriptions of illnesses they did not make any diagnoses or connect their findings with the clinician who had treated the patient when alive. They believed that the origins of an illness were to be found in the "dynamic moment", an imbalance of the four humours as postulated by Hippocrates.

For Rokitansky, however, such an approach no longer sufficed; he wanted to find explanations, to reach science-based diagnoses. One of his first autopsies that he performed as a young man together with his superior Johann Wagner (1799–1832) was that of Ludwig van Beethoven In this autopsy the question of the composer's deafness was of particular interest and the pathologists did far more than produce the customary description as they sought to find an explanation for Beethoven's deafness in anatomical changes. This was to have a lasting impression on Rokitansky's approach to research, which was driven by a desire to explain the origins of illness with the help of anatomy, an intellectual approach that had first been initiated by the Italian pathologist Giovanni Battista Morgagni in the 18th century. Rokitansky's approach differed from that of his contemporaries as he no longer looked for the "dynamic moment", but for the "anatomical seat" of the illness. The inscription on the Pathological-Anatomical Institute subsequently erected in Spitalgasse in the ninth district of Vienna therefore reads: "Indagandis sedibus et causis morborum" (Der Erforschung des Sitzes und der Ursachen der Erkrankungen).

Diagnostics

Rokitansky developed pathology from a descriptive discipline into an explanatory science. Over the course of his life he performed almost 60,000 autopsies in which he compared the patients' medical history and clinical symptoms with their autopsy protocols. He recognised that physicians named illnesses after the most conspicuous external symptom without considering the underlying internal disease of the organs (e.g. diagnosing jaundice in patients who presented with yellowish skin with no thought given to the underlying liver disease). It became clear to him that these symptomata, (which in Greek means coincidences) are not coincidences but in fact external indications of a pathological change to an internal organ.

In close collaboration with the internist Joseph Škoda he made clear the relationships between clinical symptoms that can be seen, felt or heard and pathological changes to organs, i.e. clinico-pathological correlation. Thus it was now possible for the first time to make scientifically sound diagnoses. Rokitansky thus initiated a paradigm shift from speculative, natural-philosophical medicine to systematic, science-based medicine. By classifying illnesses according to their stage of progression, it became possible to diagnose how far a pathological condition had advanced and to deliver a prognosis. From the 1830s onwards medical students and physicians from all over the world came to Vienna to learn about Rokitansky's diagnostic methods and nosology, which soon became known internationally as the Young or New Viennese School. The systematic investigation of each individual organ led to the development in Vienna of new clinical disciplines. Rokitansky also supported this development in his role as a medical advisor to the Minister of the Interior as well as the establishment of the world's first clinic for otology. As a pathologist and philosopher, Rokitansky thought about patients holistically and was vehement in his demands that patients with psychological disorders, back then called "lunatics" also had the right to a diagnosis, treatment and healing. He therefore demanded the establishment of the first University Clinic of Psychiatry in Austria. In his application, he wrote that the clinic should be headed by Theodor Meynert. The importance subsequently given to the psyche paved the way not only for Sigmund Freud, psychology and psychoanalysis, according to Eric Kandel it also influenced modernist art which turned its gaze below the surface appearance of things and placed the depiction of its models' emotions in the foreground.

Manual of Pathological Anatomy:

Rokitansky documented the results of his research in his three-volume Handbuch der pathologischen Anatomie published in 1842–46 by Braumüller & Seidel. He systematically described pathological changes to each and every organ and explained how to arrive at a diagnosis on the basis of the respective symptoms. The third edition (1855–1861) contains woodcut prints of his hand-drawn sketches of his histopathological specimens at 550-times magnification. An order of the Emperor in 1846 made it compulsory for all medical students in the Habsburg Monarchy to study Rokitansky's manual. In response to the stream of physicians and students from abroad who came to Austria to study Rokitansky's methods, the manual was translated into a number of languages to worldwide acclaim. It was published in countries including

- Russia: Rukovodstvo k patologicheskoy anatomii, 3 volumes, published by Moscow Imperial University, Moscow 1844–1849,
- the United States (New York): A Treatise on Pathological Anatomy, New York: WM. Radde 1845, and at the same time in
- the United Kingdom: A Treatise on Pathological Anatomy, London: H. Balliere 1845,
- the Netherlands: Handboek bijzondere ziektekundige ontleedkunde, Two Volumes, Erven F. Bohn, Gent 1846–1849,
- the United Kingdom: Manual of Pathological Anatomy, London: Sydenham Society 1849–54.,
- Italy: Trattato completo di anatomia patologica, Venezia: Lombardo Venetto 1852,
- the United States (Philadelphia): A Manual of Pathological Anatomy. Philadelphia: Blanchard & Lea 1855

Rokitansky's Doctrine of Crases and Dyscrases as the Groundwork for Modern Humoral Pathology

Ancient humoral pathology based on the theory of the four humours espoused by Hippocrates was concerned with the balance of the four bodily fluids, blood, yellow bile, black bile and phlegm and considered that illness was the result of an imbalance of these fluids. Nowadays, humoral pathology is an integral aspect of the humoral immune response, i.e. antibody-mediated immunity. Humoral factors in the blood stream participate in the body's immunological response to ward off infection. Rokitansky's doctrine of crases and dyscrases laid the groundwork for modern humoral pathology. As mentioned above, Rokitansky developed an interest in serology even as a student. In his subsequent pathological investigations, he analysed blood, blood plasma, blood serum, secretion, excretions, lymphs and exudates. In his doctrine of crases and dyscrases he described illnesses of the protein, nowadays also known as paraproteinemia, amyloid and immune deficiencies, as well as illnesses of the fibrin, i.e. coagulopathies. He also analysed the influence of proteins on inflammation and the effect of diseased blood components (dyscrases) on human tissue. In this regard, his ideas were far ahead of those of his contemporaries, which resulted in fierce academic debates. The physician Gustav Zimmermann (1817–1866) concurred with Rokitansky and wrote in his text book that Rokitansky's studies on blood "were like an electric shock for all those who were driven by a zeal to uncover the secrets of the pathological processes themselves". However, the physiologist and chemist Carl Gotthelf Lehmann (1812–1863) described the doctrine of crases and dyscrases as a "monstrosity" of pathological anatomy. The 25-year-old physician Rudolf Virchow (1821– 1902), who later became a renowned cellular pathologist, accused Rokitansky of having fallen back into an outdated doctrine of humoral pathology, calling the illnesses of proteins and fibrin "grave ontological errors" and Rokitansky's Manual a danger to medicine. In response to the controversy, Rokitansky withdrew those aspects of his visionary humoral pathological views which could not yet be scientifically proven. However, this did not mean that he disavowed his theory and thus he petitioned for the establishment of two new faculties in Vienna, the Institute of Medical Chemistry and the Department for General and Experimental Pathology, to press ahead with research in these fields. Virchow's criticism was not just scientifically motivated: At the time, Virchow was a young protégé of the influential privy councillor Joseph Hermann Schmidt (1804–1852) at the Ministry of Culture in Berlin. He had sent Virchow to Vienna to develop strategies to ensure the success of the Berlin Medical School on the Austrian model. Schmidt was discontented with the situation in Prussia, complaining that "it is unbearable that we are outstripped by the Viennese.". In December 1846, after staying just 10 days in Vienna, Virchow presented the Minister of Education Friedrich Eichhorn (1779–1856) with a programme on pathological anatomy. In his report Virchow criticised several respected Austrian scientists, but focused chiefly on Rokitansky as the founder of the New Viennese School. He hoped that this would lead to his rapid advancement to a position of associate professor – a hope that was not disappointed. As early as February 1847, Virchow's application for early habilitation was approved by the Prussian Minister of Education. This was highly unusual, as physicians were ordinarily required to demonstrate three years of medical practice before they could submit this application. The Prussian government, however, credited Virchow with having shaken one of the "pillars" of the Viennese School. Virchow had thus served both the interests of the Prussian educational bureaucracy and his own career.

== Political career ==
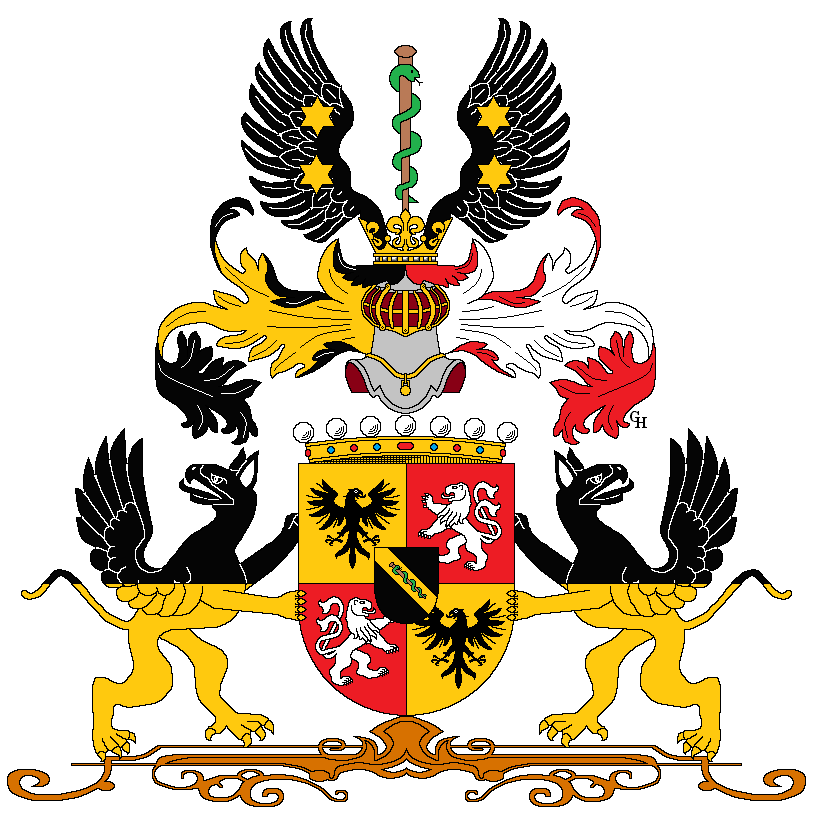
Rokitansky's arms as baron, granted in 1874

The old prosecture also played an important role in the March Revolution of 1848. What became known as the "Doctors' Revolution" was prepared by 40 physicians in Rokitansky's pathology department, as that location was not under police surveillance during the Metternich era. Due to Rokitansky's liberal attitudes, the construction of a new building was repeatedly delayed by the government to spite him. As a consequence, Rokitansky spent 35 years working in the old building which he described as being in such a state that it would "cause lasting harm to even the most robust health". In his legendary address "Freedom for Science!" [Freiheit der Naturforschung!], delivered at the inauguration of the new Pathological Anatomical Institute in 1862, Rokitansky demanded that science should be free from political interference.

By virtue of the key positions he held in various academic and political bodies, Rokitansky also had a significant influence on Liberalism in Austria. In 1863, Rokitansky was appointed by Anton von Schmerling as medical adviser to the Ministry of the Interior. In this capacity, he had great influence on university organisation, the content of medical teaching and appointments. In his pamphlet "Zeitfragen betreffend die Universität …" (1863) he addressed among other things, freedom of teaching and learning and demanded modern, interdisciplinary teaching. In "Die Conformität der Universitäten ..." (1863) he called for equality of opportunity for all students in the Habsburg Monarchy. He demanded that all universities should teach all disciplines and that examinations should be standardised. In response to his urging, the school for barber-surgeons in Graz and Innsbruck became medical faculties in 1863 and 1869, thus becoming fully-fledged universities. Moreover, he advocated opening the University of Vienna to students from the crownlands in the east and did his best to counter the emerging strains of nationalism.

On 25 November 1867, Rokitansky was "unexpectedly and unpreparedly" appointed for life to the upper chamber of the Reichsrat by Emperor Franz Joseph I. As the main speaker for the Liberal Party in the chamber, Rokitansky demanded in 1868 that each confession with the resources to do so should have the right to open schools for its children.

In his endeavours to advance "freedom and progress", he contributed significantly to university reform and to improving the healthcare system.

Under his presidency (1850–1878) the College of Physicians in Vienna campaigned for the construction of water supply lines that would bring mountain water from the Alps to Vienna. On 17 July 1848, Rokitansky became a Full Member of the Imperial Academy of Sciences, where on 26 June 1851 he gave his lecture "Ueber einige der wichtigsten Krankheiten der Arterien", one of the first occasions on which arteriosclerosis was discussed in public.[32] In 1866 he became vice-president, and from 1869 to 1878 served as President of the Imperial Academy of Sciences in Vienna, which he described as the "greatest honour that I enjoy". From 1870 Rokitansky served as first President of the Supreme Sanitary Council and as president of the newly founded Anthropological Society in Vienna.

== Philosophical career ==
Although Rokitansky defended the "materialistic method" in scientific research, he rejected materialism as a philosophical world view. In his commemorative speech on the occasion of the opening of the Institute of Pathological Anatomy at the General Hospital of Vienna, he warned against the abuse of "natural science liberties". Scientists should first regard humans as "conscious and free-willing subjects" and only then follow their urge toward knowledge. The feeling of humanity would be lost if physicians regarded human beings purely as research objects. Thus Rokitansky brought up for the first time the question of ethics in medicine. In another speech about the "solidarity of all animal life", delivered at the Imperial Academy of Sciences, Rokitansky showed his proximity to Arthur Schopenhauer's writings on compassion: "if we [... ] preserve and practice compassion", he explained "we are able to alleviate part of the load of suffering" of patients. Human generosity will be shown by our capability to accept the greatest sufferings by voluntarily renouncing aggression. Those who succeed in this should be our greatest ethical role models."

He was elected as a member of the American Philosophical Society in 1862.

In 1845, he was elected a foreign member of the Royal Swedish Academy of Sciences. On 17 July 1848 Rokitansky was elected as an effective member of the Imperial Academy of Sciences. In 1866, he became its vice-president and from 1869 until his death in Vienna, Austria-Hungary, on 23 July 1878, its president. Rokitansky felt that this "was the largest honour which I could enjoy".

== Family ==
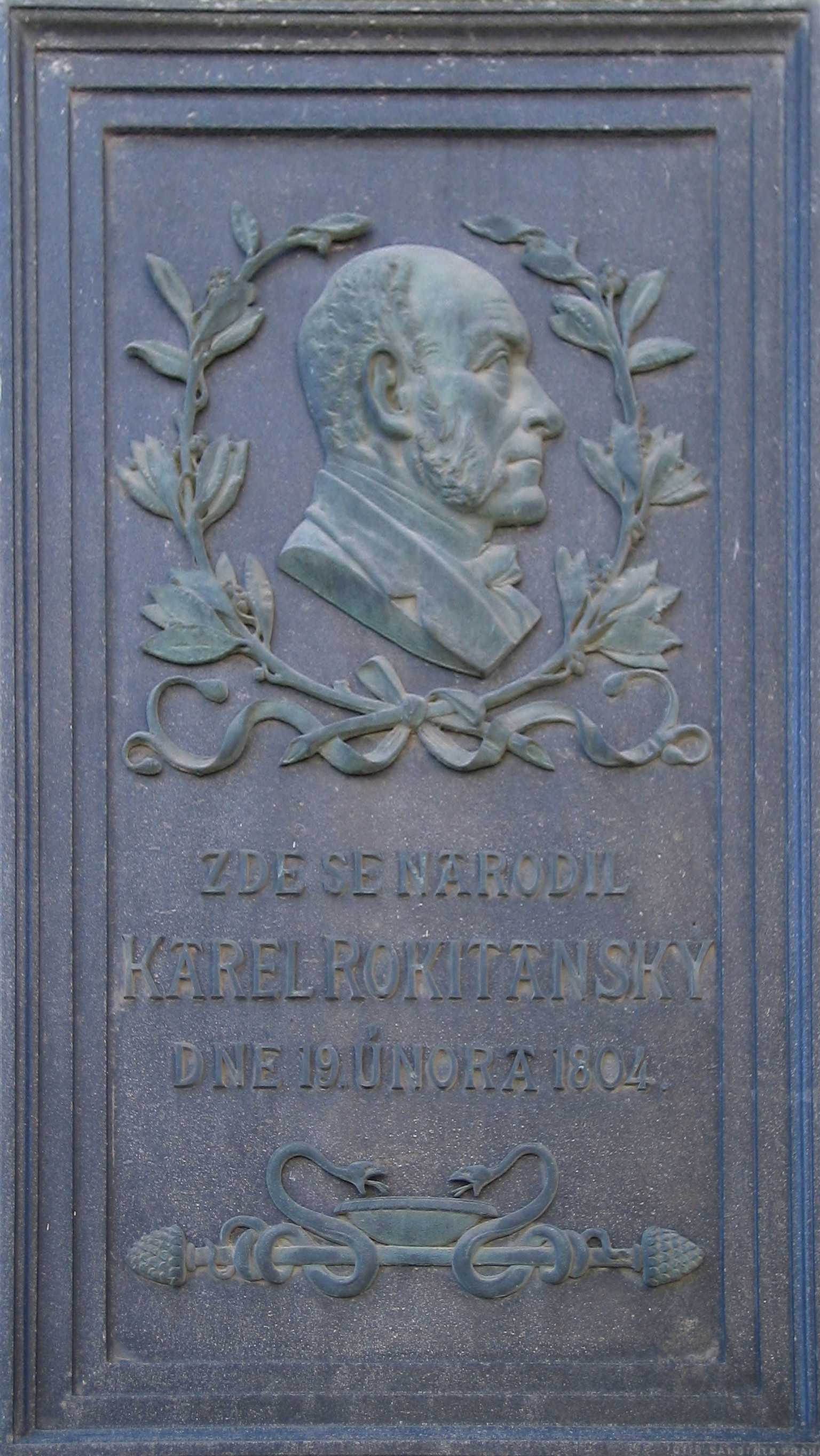
Memorial plaque to Carl von Rokitansky in Hradec Králové

In 1834 Rokitansky married the internationally recognized concert singer Marie Weis (1806–1888). She was a student of Antonio Salieri (1770–1825), who gave her free singing lessons because of her special talent. She sang with Franz Schubert and Franz Liszt, She taught her two eldest sons,

- the Opera Singer, Hans von Rokitansky (1835–1909),
- and the concert singer and composer Victor von Rokitansky (1836–1896).

The two younger sons studied medicine.

- Karl Rokitansky (1839–1898), became professor for gynaecology in Graz,
- Prokop Rokitansky (1842 – 24 August 1928), became professor for internal medicine and rector of the University of Innsbruck.

== Memberships of international learned societies and honors ==
Rokitansky became Member of:

- the Imperial-Royal College of Physicians, Vienna
- the Academy of Sciences, Paris
- the German Academy of Sciences Leopoldina (1856)
- the Society of German Natural Scientists and Physicians, Heidelberg
- the Society of Physical Medicine of the Lower Rhine
- the Royal Academy of Sciences, Stockholm
- the Society of Swedish Physicians, Stockholm
- the Royal College of Physicians, Copenhagen

Corresponding Member of:

- the Académie des Sciences zu Paris(1870)
- the New York Academy of Medicine
- the Society of Biology, Paris
- the Royal College of Physicians in Pesth
- the Provincial Medical and Surgical Association, later the British Medical Association
- the Medical Association, Munich
- the Association of the Medical Officials of the Grand Duchy of Baden for the Promotion
- of State Pharmacology of the Rhenish Society of Natural Sciences, Mainz

Honorary member of:

- the Royal Medical and Chirurgical Society of London
- the Anatomical Society, Paris
- the Royal Academy of Medicine of Belgium
- the Imperial Medical-Surgical Academy, St Petersburg
- the American Academy of Arts and Sciences, Boston
- the Society of German Physicians of New York City
- the Faculty of Medicine in Prague
- the Society of General Practitioners in Lemberg
- the Society of Medicine in Strasbourg
- the Society of German Natural Scientists and Physicians
- the Society for Natural History and Medical Science in Dresden
- the Hufeland Society
- the General Austrian Apothecaries' Association

Honours:

- Knight of the Imperial Austrian Order of Franz Joseph (1853)
- Knight of the Royal Greek Order of the Redeemer (1851)
- Imperial-Austrian Grand Medal for Science and Arts (1847)
- Commander's Cross of the Imperial-Royal Austrian Order of Leopold (1874)
- Commander's Cross of the Imperial Russian Order of Saint Stanislaus (1861)
- Officer's Cross of the Royal Greek Order of the Redeemer (1864)
- Grand Cross of the Mexican Imperial Order of Guadeloupe (1865)
- Officer of the Order of the Crown of Italy (1874)

Honorary Diplomas of the:

- Faculty of Medicine, Prague (1874)
- Faculty of Philosophy, Jena (1861)
- University of Cracow (1874)

=== Contributions ===
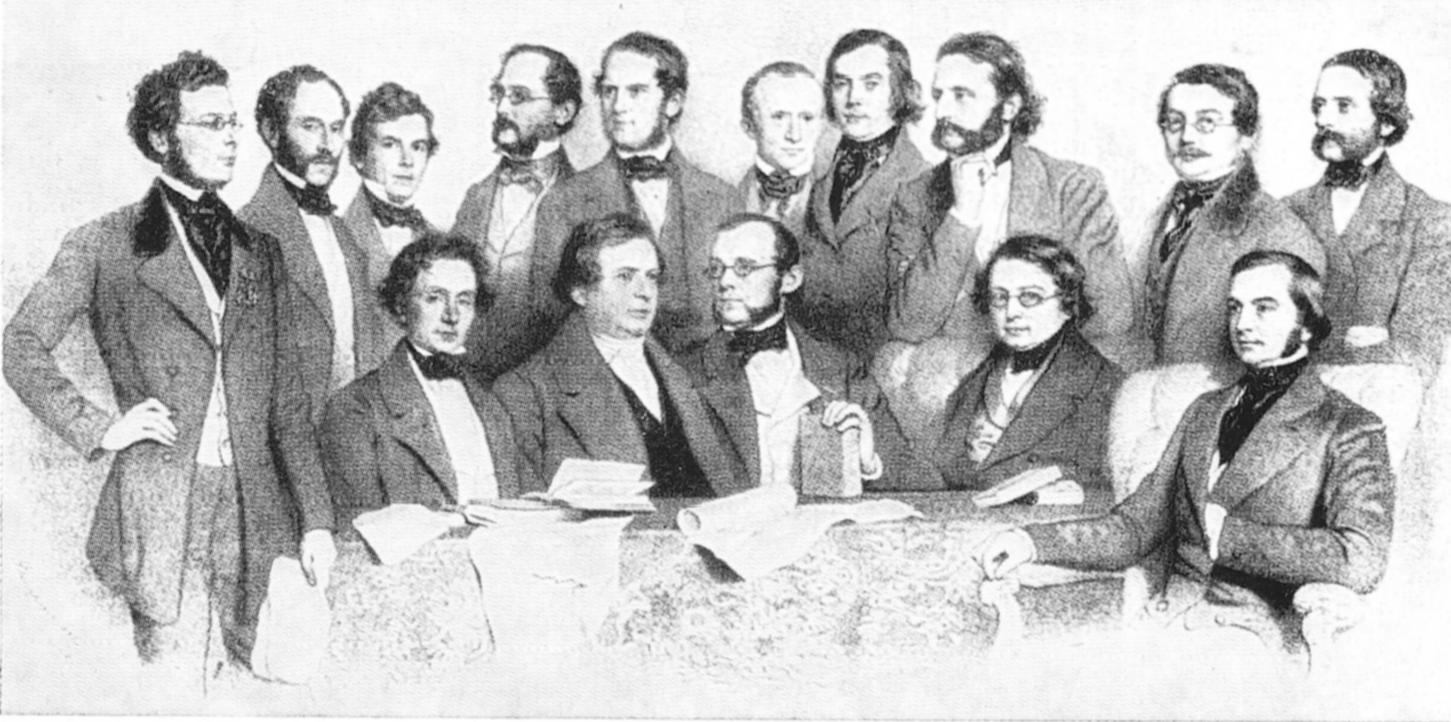
Rokitansky (age 49) and his Vienna colleagues (1853). He is the third man from the right in the bottom row, holding a book and looking left to his right.

Rokitansky's name is associated with the following diseases/morphologic features of disease:

- Superior Mesenteric Artery Syndrome
- Müllerian agenesis (aka "Mayer-Rokitansky-Küster-Hauser syndrome")
- Rokitansky's diverticulum
- Rokitansky's triad (pulmonary stenosis)
- Rokitansky-Aschoff sinuses (in the gallbladder)
- Rokitansky-Cushing ulcer
- Rokitansky-Maude Abbott syndrome
- Von Rokitansky's syndrome
- Rokitansky nodule – teratomas
- Congenitally corrected transposition of the great arteries (levo-Transposition of the great arteries)

he first described about endometriosis in 1860

Rokitansky also developed a method of autopsy which consisted mainly of in situ dissection. Rokitansky is said "to have supervised 70,000 autopsies, and personally performed over 30,000, averaging two a day, seven days a week, for 45 years".

== Published works ==
His published works include:

- Handbuch der pathologischen Anatomie. Braumüller u. Seidel, Wien (3 Bände, 1842–1846). Bild auf Wikiversity; 3rd Edition 1855–1861.
- Rukovodstvo k patologicheskoy anatomii, 3 Bände und 1 Atlas Pathologische Histologie, Verlag der Kaiserlichen Universität Moskau, Moskau 1844– 1849. (online)
- A Treatise on pathological anatomy. By Dr. John C Peters, New York: 1845 WM. Radde. London: 1845 H. Balliere. accessed 4 April 2021.
- Handboek der bijzondere ziektekundige ontleedkunde, Two Volumes, Erven F. Bohn, Gent 1846–1849, accessed 4 April 2021
- Über einige der wichtigsten Krankheiten der Arterien (= Denkschriften der mathematisch-naturwissenschaftlichen Classe der kaiserlichen Akademie der Wissenschaften. Band 4). Wien 1851.
- A Manual of Pathological Anatomy, 4 Volumes, London: Sydenham Society; 1849–54. accessed 2 April 2021.
- Trattato completo di anatomia patologica, 3 Bände, Venezia: Co' Tipi del Giornale Lombardo-Veneto, T. Gattei; 1852
- A Manual of Pathological Anatomy. Philadelphia: Blanchard & Lea; 1855. accessed 4 April 2021.
- Zur Orientierung über Medizin und deren Praxis. Vortrag gehalten bei der feierlichen Sitzung der Kaiserlichen Akademie der Wissenschaften am 31. Mai 1858. In: Almanach der Kaiserlichen Akademie der Wissenschaften, 9, Wien 1859, pp 119–152.
- Festrede: Freiheit der Naturforschung. Feierliche Eröffnung des pathologisch-anatomischen Instituts im k. k. allg. Krankenhaus am 24. Mai 1862 (Wien 1862).
- Die Conformität der Universitäten mit Rücksicht auf gegenwärtige österreichische Zustände. Wien 1863.
- Zeitfragen betreffend die Universität mit besonderer Beziehung auf Medizin. Wien 1863.
- Der selbstständige Werth des Wissens. Vortrag gehalten in der Sitzung der Kaiserlichen Akademie der Wissenschaften am 31. Mai 1867. 2., von der Kaiserlichen Akademie der Wissenschaften genehmigte Auflage, Wien 1869.
- Die Solidarität alles Thierlebens. Vortrag gehalten bei der feierlichen Sitzung der Kaiserlichen Akademie der Wissenschaften am 31. Mai 1869. In: Almanach der Kaiserlichen Akademie der Wissenschaften, 19, Wien 1869, pp 185–220.
- Die Defecte der Scheidewände des Herzens. Pathologische anatomische Abhandlung. Wien 1875.
- Selbstbiographie und Antrittsrede. Eingeleitet, ed. und mit Erläuterungen versehen von Lesky Erna (Wien 1960).

== In popular culture ==
The main character in the film series Mad Max, Max Rockatansky, is named after Carl von Rokitansky. The reason for this bizarre connection is the fact that the director of this film series, George Miller, studied medicine and also made a living as doctor at the time when he was raising funds for his first movie - Mad Max.
