= Adenomyomatosis =

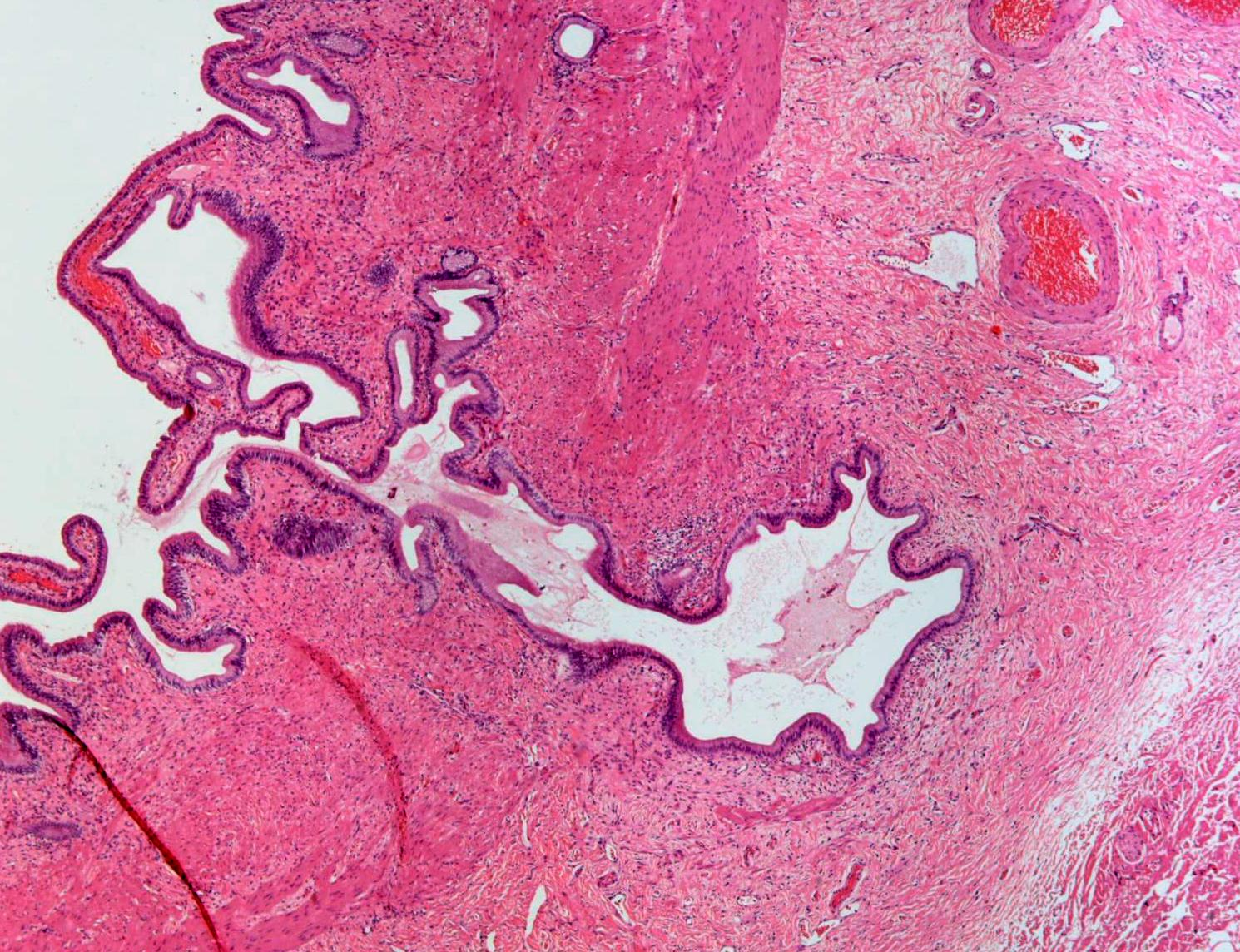
- Micrograph showing Rokitansky–Aschoff sinus. H&E stain.

Adenomyomatosis is a benign condition characterized by hyperplastic changes of unknown cause involving the wall of the gallbladder.

== Pathophysiology ==
Adenomyomatosis of the gallbladder as seen on ultrasound

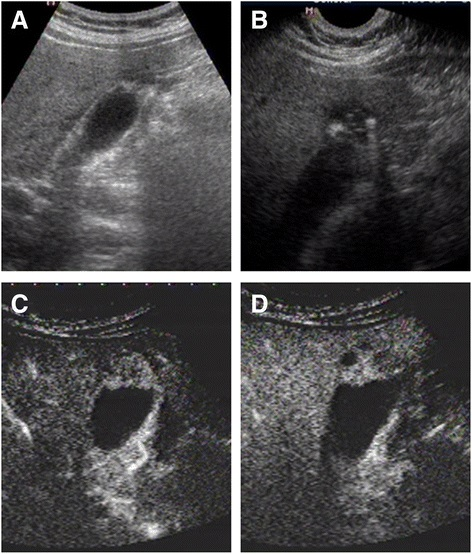
Non-contrast abdominal ultrasound and contrast-enhanced ultrasound (CEUS) of adenomyomatosis of the gallbladder: a The fundus of the gallbladder wall was thickened and the GB wall was obscure. b The intramural echogenic foci were detected by high frequency transducer. c CEUS—arterial phase (22 s) —heterogeneous hyper-enhancement and wall was intact. d CEUS—venous phase (34 s) the anechoic spaces were more clear.

=== Rokitansky–Aschoff sinuses ===
Rokitansky–Aschoff sinuses are pseudodiverticula or pockets in the wall of the gallbladder. They may be microscopic or macroscopic. Histologically, they are outpouchings of gallbladder mucosa into the gallbladder muscle layer and subserosal tissue as a result of hyperplasia and herniation of epithelial cells through the fibromuscular layer of the gallbladder wall.

Rokitansky–Aschoff sinuses are not of themselves considered abnormal but they can be associated with cholecystitis.

They form as a result of increased pressure in the gallbladder and recurrent damage to the wall of the gallbladder.

=== Associations ===
Black pigment gallstones can form in Rokitansky–Aschoff sinuses of the gallbladder after the fourth to fifth decades of life in absence of the typical risk factors for bilirubin supersaturation of bile. Hence, they are associated with gallstones (cholelithiasis). Cases of gallbladder cancer have also been reported to arise from Rokitansky–Aschoff sinuses.

== Diagnosis ==
Abdominal ultrasound has low accuracy in differentiating gall bladder adenomyomatosis from cancer and is operator dependent. However, it is used as the exam of the first-line due to its wide availability. Ultrasound findings may show thickened gall bladder wall, tiny anechoic spaces (Rokitansky–Aschoff sinuses or RAS), and twinkling artifact (or comet-tail reverberation). Comet tail reverberation, which is due to reflections from cholesterol crystals, is a highly specific sign for adenomyomatosis.

On CT scan, it may show rosary sign, showing mucosal epithelium with intramural diverticula.

Magnetic resonance imaging also plays an important role in the diagnosis of Rokitansky–Aschoff sinuses. In fat-suppression MRI, RAS present with small, rounded, high signal intensity foci, called "pearl necklace sign".

== Eponym ==
Rokitansky–Aschoff sinuses are named after Carl Freiherr von Rokitansky (1804–1878), a pathologist in Vienna, Austria and Ludwig Aschoff (1866–1942), a pathologist in Bonn, Germany.

== See also ==
- Cholecystectomy
- Strawberry gallbladder
- Diverticulum
- Hyperplasia
- Gallbladder
