= Percussion (medicine) =

Clinical examination technique

- MeSH: D010474
- MedlinePlus: 002281

Percussion is a technique of clinical examination.

== Overview ==
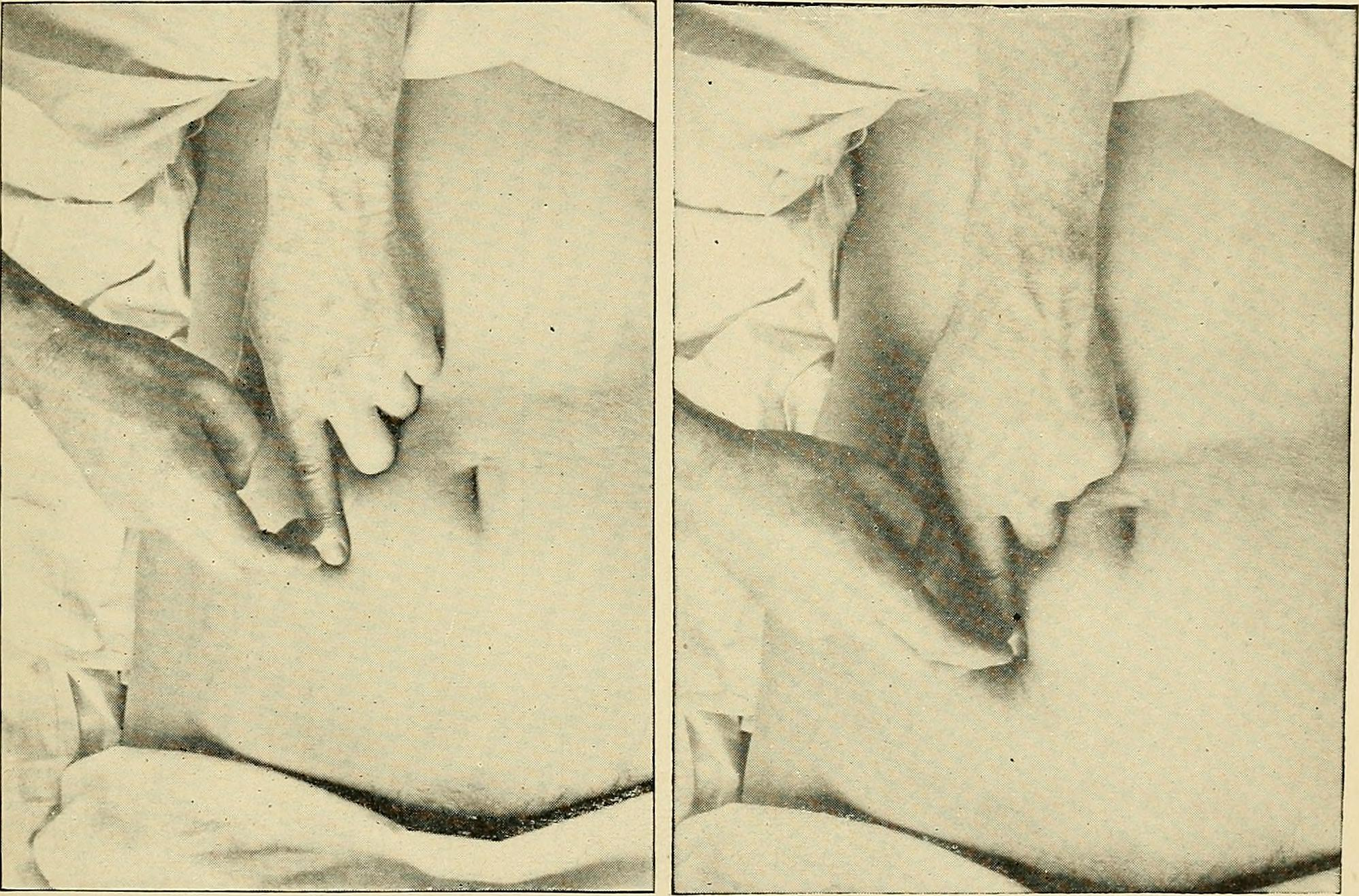
Superficial and deep percussion of the abdomen.

Percussion is a method of tapping on a surface to determine the underlying structures, and is used in clinical examinations to assess the condition of the thorax or abdomen. It is one of the four methods of clinical examination, together with inspection, palpation, auscultation, and inquiry. It is done with the middle finger of one hand tapping on the middle finger of the other hand using a wrist action. The nonstriking finger (known as the pleximeter) is placed firmly on the body over tissue. When percussing boney areas such as the clavicle, the pleximeter can be omitted and the bone is tapped directly such as when percussing an apical cavitary lung lesion typical of tuberculosis.

There are two types of percussion: direct, which uses only one or two fingers; and indirect, which uses only the middle/flexor finger. Broadly classifying, there are four types of percussion sounds: resonant, hyper-resonant, stony dull or dull. A dull sound indicates the presence of a solid mass under the surface. A more resonant sound indicates hollow, air-containing structures. As well as producing different notes which can be heard they also produce different sensations in the pleximeter finger.

Percussion was at first used to distinguish between empty and filled barrels of liquor, and Dr. Leopold Auenbrugger is said to be the person who introduced the technique to modern medicine, although this method was used by Avicenna about 1000 years before that for medical practice such as using percussion over the stomach to show how full it is, and to distinguish between ascites and tympanites.

== Of the thorax ==
It is used to diagnose pneumothorax, emphysema and other diseases. It can be used to assess the respiratory mobility of the thorax.

== Of the abdomen ==
It is used to find whether any organ is enlarged and similar (assessing for organomegaly). It is based on the principle of setting tissue and spaces in between at vibration. The sound thus generated is used to determine if the tissue is healthy or pathological.

== Notes ==
Based on the auditory and tactile perception, the notes heard can be categorized as:

- Tympanitic, drum-like sounds heard over air filled structures during the abdominal examination.
- Hyperresonant (pneumothorax), said to sound similar to percussion of puffed up cheeks.
- Normal resonance/ Resonant, the sound produced by percussing a normal chest.
- Impaired resonance (mass, consolidation) lower than normal percussion sounds.
- Dull (consolidation), similar to percussion of a mass such as a liver.
- Stony dull, the sounds produced on percussion from the pleximeter with no contribution from the underlying area.

Percussion may induce pain, this is often also noted as it can indicate underlying pathology.
