= Gerard van Swieten =

Dutch physician (1700–1772)

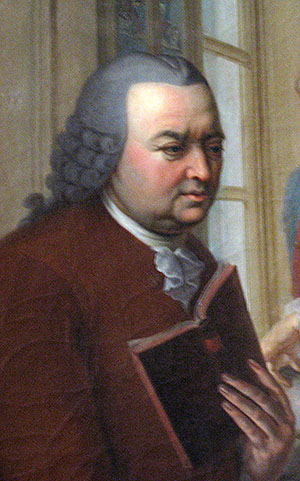
- Born: 7 May 1700; Leiden, Netherlands
- Died: 18 June 1772 (aged 72); Vienna, Austria
- Education: Leiden University (M.D., 1725); University of Leuven
- Scientific career
- Fields: Medicine, pharmacy
- Thesis: De arteriae fabrica et efficacia in corpore humano (1725)
- Doctoral advisor: Bernhard Siegfried Albinus
- Other academic advisors: Herman Boerhaave
- Doctoral students: Anton von Störck
- Other notable students: Nikolaus von Jacquin

Gerard van Swieten (7 May 1700 – 18 June 1772) was a Dutch physician who from 1745 was the personal physician of the Holy Roman Empress Maria Theresa and transformed the Austrian health service and medical university education. He was the father of Gottfried van Swieten, patron of Haydn, Mozart and Beethoven.

== Youth and study ==
Gerard van Swieten was the one surviving child of a prominent Catholic family in Leiden. His parents, the notary Thomas van Swieten (1662–1712) and Elisabeth Loo (†1708), had their children baptized by Jesuit priests, and Van Swieten remained a Roman Catholic throughout his life. His paternal family had been prominent Leiden citizens since the 15th century, carrying a coat of arms with three violins, which Van Swieten modified and adopted when he was made a Baron in 1753. They potentially descended from the old but already extinct noble house of Van Swieten, from the castle Zwieten, though there is no direct evidence for this.

Van Swieten was a precocious student, finishing Latin school at the age of 12, around the time he became an orphan on 8 July 1712. His father had appointed two friends as guardians, Adriaan Duyvens and Arnold Coops, and, when in Leiden, Van Swieten would live at Coops' house until 1727. He had already enrolled at Leiden University to study philosophy, though at the age of 14, he studied a few months in Leuven (September 1714 – January 1715) and from 1715 he set his mind on pharmacy. Between November 1715 and December 1716 he was a resident pupil of the pharmacist Laurens Tatum in Amsterdam, breaking off this education when he contracted smallpox. Back in Leiden he enrolled at the University again and became a resident pupil with the pharmacist Nicolaas Stam, whose father had introduced Herman Boerhaave to chemistry. After three years, in 1720, he became a pharmacist; the following 5 year he not only ran a pharmacy, but also studied medicine at Leiden University. Here he almost exclusively followed classes by Herman Boerhaave and Bernhard Siegfried Albinus. With Albinus as his advisor, he obtained his medical doctorate in July 1725 with a dissertation on the structure and function of arteries (De arteriae fabrica et efficacia in corpore humano).

== A physician in Leiden ==
Following his promotion, Van Swieten started a medical practice in Leiden. He initially ran his pharmacy in parallel, but in 1727 he handed this over to a son of his guardian Arnold Frans Coops. He saw many patients and soon, apparently with Boerhaave's permission, also started giving private lessons in pharmacy and materia medicae, drawing 60 British students for his first course alone. He never was officially licensed to do so, and in 1734 the university forbade him to continue. Within a year or two, he could afford buying a stately house. Though they had no close personal relationship, Van Swieten was a great admirer of Boerhaave. After his study, Van Swieten kept attending Boerhaave's classes, making extensive notes on each and purportedly missing only one lecture between 1725 and 1738. Eventually, Van Swieten published these notes in five volumes between 1742 and 1771. When Boerhaave died in 1738, Van Swieten was by many considered his natural heir and he did take over part of Boerhaave's practice. However, he was not and had not expected to be offered his chair, since Catholics were not accepted as faculty at Leiden University.

In September 1729, Van Swieten married Maria L. E. T. ter Beeck van Coesfelt (c.1711–1784), the daughter of a notary in The Hague and the sister of a fellow student in Leiden. Though she did not feature prominently in Van Swieten's public life, contemporaries reported a very happy marriage. Between 1731 and 1746 they had six children, five in Leiden and one in Vienna. The first (1731) was named Elisabeth after his mother, the oldest son (1733) was named Godfried after her father, and the youngest child (1746) was named Maria Theresia after the Empress, who was also her godmother. Their son Godfried (later in Austria spelled Gottfried) became famous in his own right as Austrian ambassador and patron of the great classical composers.

November 1742 saw the death of Joannes Baptista Bassand, personal physician of the Holy Roman Empress Maria Theresia and a former student of Boerhaave. As a Catholic and a foremost student of Boerhaave, Van Swieten received an offer to fill this position as well as that of director of the court library in early 1743. He respectfully declined, writing to a friend that he much preferred to remain "a small republican than to carry a pompous title that simply conceals a slavish existence". After one-and-a-half years of enticements, Van Swieten finally accepted the offer in October 1744. Before his letter of acceptance had arrived, Van Swieten found himself called to the court in Brussels, where Maria Theresa's younger sister, Maria Anna, Governor of the Austrian Netherlands, was ailing following the birth of a stillborn child. While Maria Anna did not recover and died in early December, Van Swieten's swift response and confident actions had nevertheless endeared him further to Maria Theresa. By May 1745, the Van Swieten family had sold all their belongings in the Netherlands and traveled to Vienna.

== Career in Austria ==
In his new position he implemented a transformation of the Austrian health service and medical university education. He was the proposer of the main sanitary reform in the Habsburg monarchy, "Generale Normativum in Re Sanitatis", implemented by Maria Theresa in 1770. He founded a botanical garden, a chemical laboratory and introduced clinical instruction. Since 1745 he was also librarian for Maria Theresa for what was then the Imperial Library.

Beside his medical activities, Gerard van Swieten was also active as a reformer. Especially the censorship was organised in a different way under his direction. He drove out the Jesuits that were in charge of the censorship before and carried out a centralisation of the censorship that was only partly successful. He also tried to use scientific and rational aspects for the judgement of literature.

=== Vampires ===
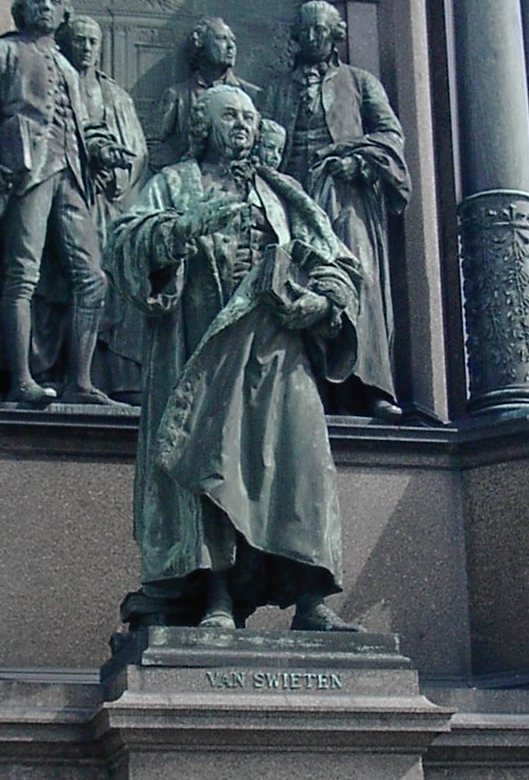
Gerard van Swieten on the Maria Theresia Memorial, Vienna

Especially important is his part in the fight against superstition during the enlightenment, particularly in the case of the vampires, reported from villages in Serbia in the years between 1718 and 1732.

Following the conclusion of the Austro-Turkish War in 1718, Northern Serbia and a part of Bosnia came under Habsburg control. Through the settlement of refugees granted Wehrbauer status in the new border regions, vampire stories spread to German-speaking areas for the first time.

In 1755 Gerard van Swieten was sent by Empress Maria Theresa to Moravia to investigate the situation relating to vampires. He viewed the vampire myth as a "barbarism of ignorance" and his aim was to eradicate it.

His report, Abhandlung des Daseyns der Gespenster (or Discourse on the Existence of Ghosts), offered an entirely natural explanation for the belief in vampires. He dismissed the claims of unusual circumstances around graves with possible causes such as the processes of fermentation and lack of oxygen being reasons for preventing decomposition. Characteristic for his opinion is this quotation from the preface to his essay of 1768 "that all the fuss doesn't come from anything other than vain fear, superstitious credulity, dark and eventful imagination and simplicity and ignorance among these people." In response to the report, Maria Theresa issued a decree that banned all traditional defences that locals had been using, such as putting accused vampires to the stakes, beheading or burning them.

In 1758, he also examined and treated Magda Logomer, a woman condemned to death in Zagreb for witchcraft at the request of Maria Theresa, leading to the verdict being cancelled by the queen, ending a phase of witch trials in Croatia.

== Honors ==
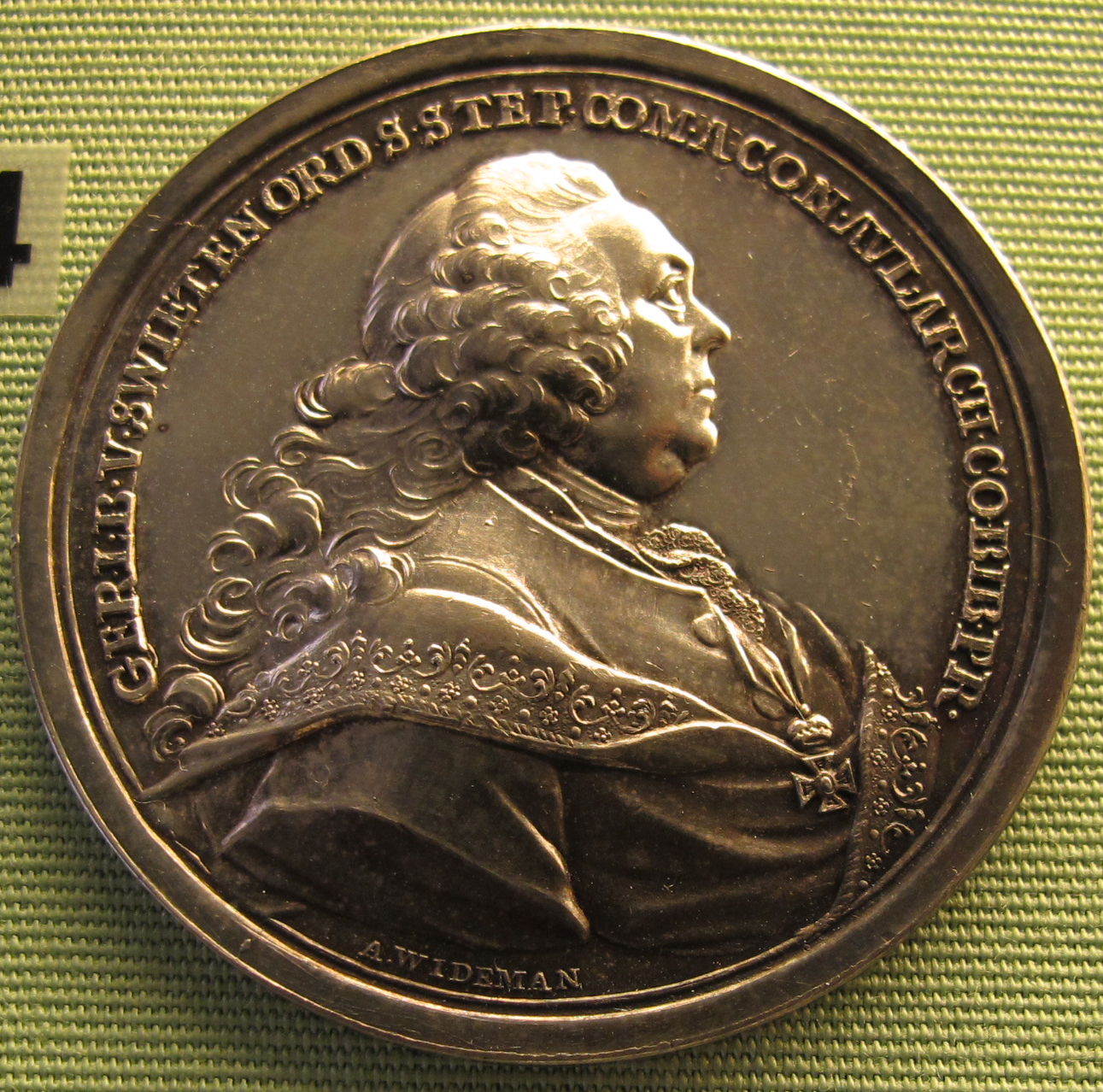
Medal of 1772 featuring Van Swieten

In May 1749 van Swieten was elected a Fellow of the Royal Society. In 1751, he was elected a foreign member of the Royal Swedish Academy of Sciences.

A genus of mahogany was named after Gerard van Swieten, Swietenia, by Nikolaus Joseph von Jacquin.

The Frank – van Swieten Lectures, an international course about strategic information management in hospitals, that is organised by TU Braunschweig, University of Amsterdam, University of Heidelberg, UMIT at Hall near Innsbruck, Fachhochschule Heilbronn and Leipzig University, is named after him.
