= Litman =

Litman is a surname. Notable people with the name include:

- Alice Litman (2002–2022), English transgender woman
- Daniel Litman (born 1990), Israeli actor
- David Litman (born 1957), American technology chief executive
- Diane Litman, American professor of computer science
- Ellen Litman (born 1973), American novelist
- Eric Litman (born 1973), American entrepreneur and angel investor
- Harry Litman (born 1958), American lawyer
- Jack Litman (1943–2010), American criminal defense lawyer
- Jessica Litman, American copyright law expert
- Juliet Litman, American journalist, editor, and media personality
- June Margaret Litman (1926–1991), New Zealand journalist
- Leah Litman (born 1984), American legal scholar
- Pepi Litman (c. 1874–1930), Yiddish vaudeville singer
- Roslyn Litman (1928-2016), American lawyer
- Scott Litman (born 1966), American entrepreneur from Minnesota

== See also ==
- Littmann
- Littman
