= Lettmann =

Lettmann is a German surname. Notable people with the surname include:

- Ina Lettmann (born 1977), German model and entrepreneur
- Jochen Lettmann (born 1969), German slalom canoeist
- Reinhard Lettmann (1933–2013), German Roman Catholic bishop

== See also ==
- Littmann
