= David Littman =

David Littman may refer to:

- David Littman (activist) (1933–2012), British historian human rights activist
- David Littman (ice hockey) (born 1967), American ice hockey goaltender

== See also ==
- David Litman (born 1957), American technology chief executive
- David Littmann (1906–1981), American cardiologist
