= Littman =

Littman is a surname. Notable people with the name include:

- Dan Littman, American immunologist
- David Littman (disambiguation), multiple people, including:
  - David Littman (activist) (1933–2012), British human rights activist
  - David Littman (ice hockey) (born 1967), American ice hockey goaltender
- Frederic Littman (1907–1979), Hungarian-American sculptor
- Jonathan Littman (born 1963), American film producer
- Jonathan Littman (author) (born 1958), American author and journalist
- Lisa Littman, medical researcher at the center of the rapid onset gender dysphoria controversy
- Lynne Littman (born 1941), American film and television director and producer
- Marguerite Littman (1930-2020), American-British socialite and HIV/AIDS activist
- Michael L. Littman (born 1966), American computer scientist

== See also ==
- Littmann
- Litman
