= Littmann =

Littmann is a surname. Notable people with the name include:

- Corny Littmann (born 1952), German entrepreneur, entertainer, and theater owner
- David Littmann (1906–1981), German-American cardiologist
- Ellen Littmann (1909-1975), Jewish writer
- Enno Littmann (1875–1958), German orientalist
- Max Littmann (1862–1931), German architect
- Heilmann & Littmann

== See also ==
- Littman
- Litman
