= Electromagnetic diaphragm =

Capacitive sensor used on an electronic stethoscope

An electromagnetic diaphragm is a form of capacitive sensor used on an electronic stethoscope. The diaphragm is coated with a conductive material. A conductive plate is positioned behind and parallel to the diaphragm, so that the two conductive elements form a capacitor. Capacitance is a function of plate area, dielectric properties of the space between the conductors, and the distance between the conductors. It is this latter parameter which is modulated by vibration such that the capacitance varies with the distance between the electromagnetic diaphragm and the plate, forming an acoustic sensor.

The electromagnetic diaphragm is a form of capacitive sensor, and shares properties with condenser microphones. The difference between the electromagnetic diaphragm and a condenser microphone is that a condenser microphone operates on the basis of air transmission, has a very thin membrane instead of a diaphragm, and cannot be placed against a body to sense sounds within the body.

The electromagnetic diaphragm for stethoscopes was patented by Clive Smith in 2002 and is used on Thinklabs electronic stethoscopes.

== Photography ==
Electromagnetic diaphragm mechanisms are also used in photography lens barrels for providing highly accurate aperture blade control when using auto exposure during continuous shooting.

== See also ==
- Microphone
