= Arthur Leared =

Irish physician and traveller

Arthur Leared FRCP
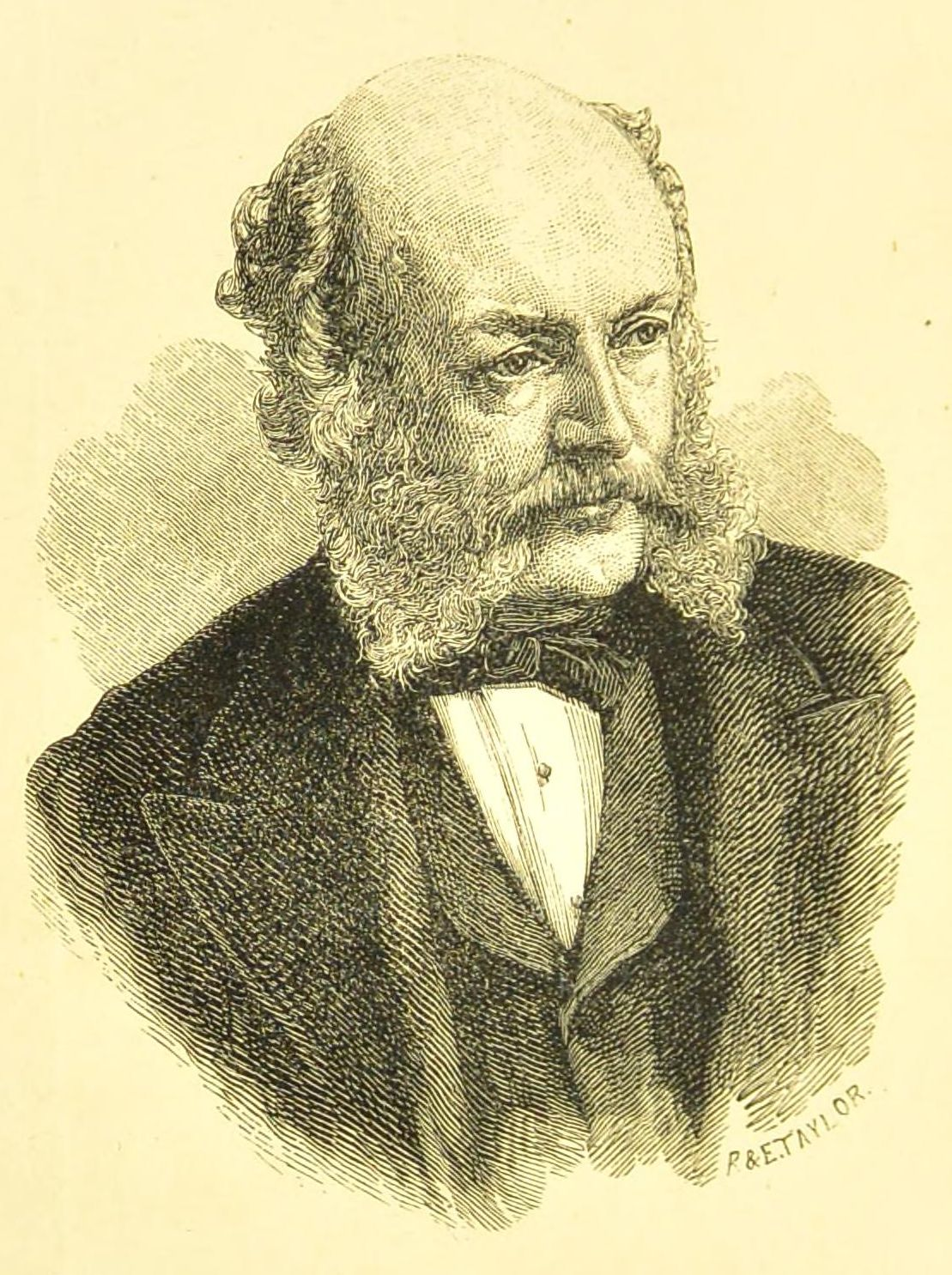
- Arthur Leared by R & E Taylor (1882)
- Born: 1822; Wexford, County Wexford, Ireland
- Died: 16 October 1879 (aged 56–57); Old Burlington Street, London, England
- Resting place: Highgate Cemetery, North London
- Education: Trinity College Dublin (B.A., 1845; M.B., 1847; M.D., 1860)
- Occupations: Physician; scientist; traveller
- Known for: Inventing the binaural stethoscope in 1851
- Spouses: Anne Eliza Jeffries (m. 1853; died 1870) Mary Jane Wynch (m. 1872)

Arthur Leared FRCP (1822 – 16 October 1879) was an Irish physician, scientist and traveller of the world. Practising in Dublin, he is best known for inventing the binaural stethoscope in 1851.

== Early life ==
Leared was born in Wexford, Ireland in 1822 and was educated at Trinity College, Dublin, where he graduated with a B.A. in 1845, am M.B. in 1847, and M.D. in 1860.

== Career ==
He practised medicine in County Wexford until 1851, when he left for India, but poor health made the stay short. From 1852 he established himself as physician in London, and in 1854 was admitted a member of the Royal College of Physicians. In 1860 he was admitted M.D. ad eundem at Oxford on 7 February 1861 and in 1871 he became a Fellow of the Royal College of Physicians. During the Crimean War he acted as physician to the British Civil Hospital at Smyrna, and subsequently visited Palestine. On his return to London he was connected with the Great Northern Hospital, the Royal Infirmary for Diseases of the Chest, the Metropolitan Dispensary, and St. Mark's Hospital for Fistula. He also lectured on the practice of medicine at the Grosvenor Place School of Medicine.

In 1862, Leared paid the first of four visits to Iceland, the last being in 1874. He published a book in Icelandic on the "'Fatal Cystic Disease of Iceland". In the autumn of 1870, he visited America. In 1872, he journeyed to Morocco, and he revisited that country on two other occasions; in 1877, as physician to the Portuguese embassy, and in the summer of 1879. Armed with a free pass from the sultan he was enabled to visit the cities of Morocco, Fez, and Mequinez. He likewise explored unfrequented parts of the country, and among other minor discoveries succeeded in identifying the site of the Roman station of Volubilis, an account of which he communicated to The Academy of 29 June 1878.

On a breezy upland, north of Tangier, Leared secured a piece of land for an intended sanatorium for consumptive patients, as he believed the climate to be suitable.

He belonged to learned societies and contributed to professional journals, mostly on subjects connected with the sounds of the heart and the disorders of digestion. He laid claim to the invention of the double (binaural) stethoscope.

== Binaural stethoscope ==
In 1851, Leared invented the binaural stethoscope, a stethoscope that fits into both ears. His stethoscope was made of gutta-percha and was displayed at the Great Exhibition.

== Works ==
Leared wrote travel and medical books. His major writings are:

- 'The Causes and Treatment of Imperfect Digestion,' London, 1860; 7th edit. 1882, with portrait.
- 'On the Sounds caused by the Circulation of the Blood,' London, 1861, his thesis for the M.D. degree at Dublin.
- 'Morocco and the Moors.' London, 1876; 2nd edit, revised by Sir Richard F. Burton, 1891.
- 'A Visit to the Court of Morocco.' London, 1879.

He also edited Amariah Brigham's 'Mental Exertion in relation to Health', 1864 and 1866.

== Personal life and death ==
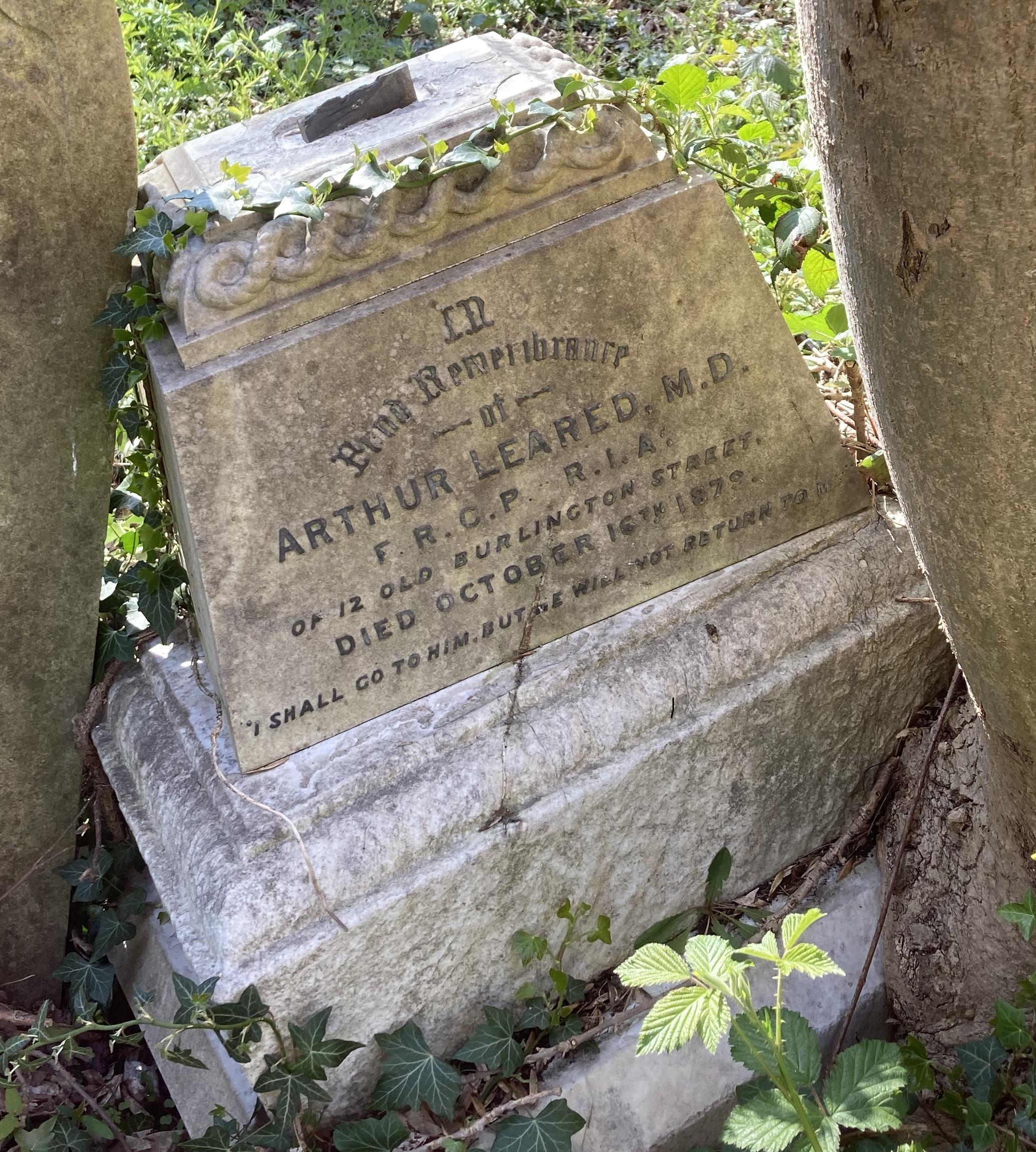
Grave of Arthur Leared in Highgate Cemetery

He was married twice, firstly in Dublin in 1853 to Anne Eliza Jeffries, who died in 1870, and secondly in 1872 to Mary Jane Wynch who outlived him. He died at their home, 12 Old Burlington Street, London on 16 October 1879 and is buried on the eastern side of Highgate Cemetery.
