= Stethoscope =

Medical device for auscultation

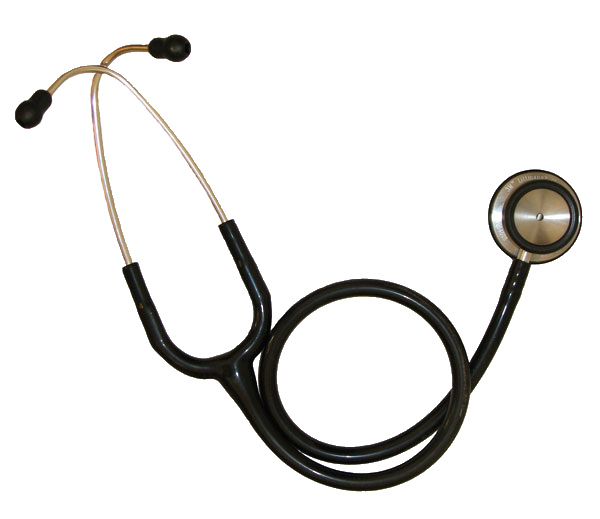
- Modern stethoscope
- Classification: Medical device
- Industry: Medicine
- Application: Auscultation
- Inventor: René Laennec in 1816; binaural version by Arthur Leared in 1851
- Invented: 1816 (210 years ago)

Stethoscope Sounds
Recorded auscultation of a healthy 16 year old girl's heart, as heard with a digital stethoscope on the tricuspid valve area.

The stethoscope (from Ancient Greek στῆθος (stêthos) 'breast' and σκοπέω (skopéō) 'to look') is a medical device for auscultation, or listening to internal sounds of an animal or human body. It typically has a small disc-shaped resonator that is placed against the naked skin, with either one or two tubes connected to two earpieces. A stethoscope can be used to listen to the sounds made by the heart, lungs or intestines, as well as blood flow in arteries and veins. In combination with a manual sphygmomanometer, it is commonly used when measuring blood pressure. It was invented in 1816 by René Laennec and the binaural version by Arthur Leared in 1851.

A stethoscope that intensifies auscultatory sounds is called a phonendoscope.

== History ==
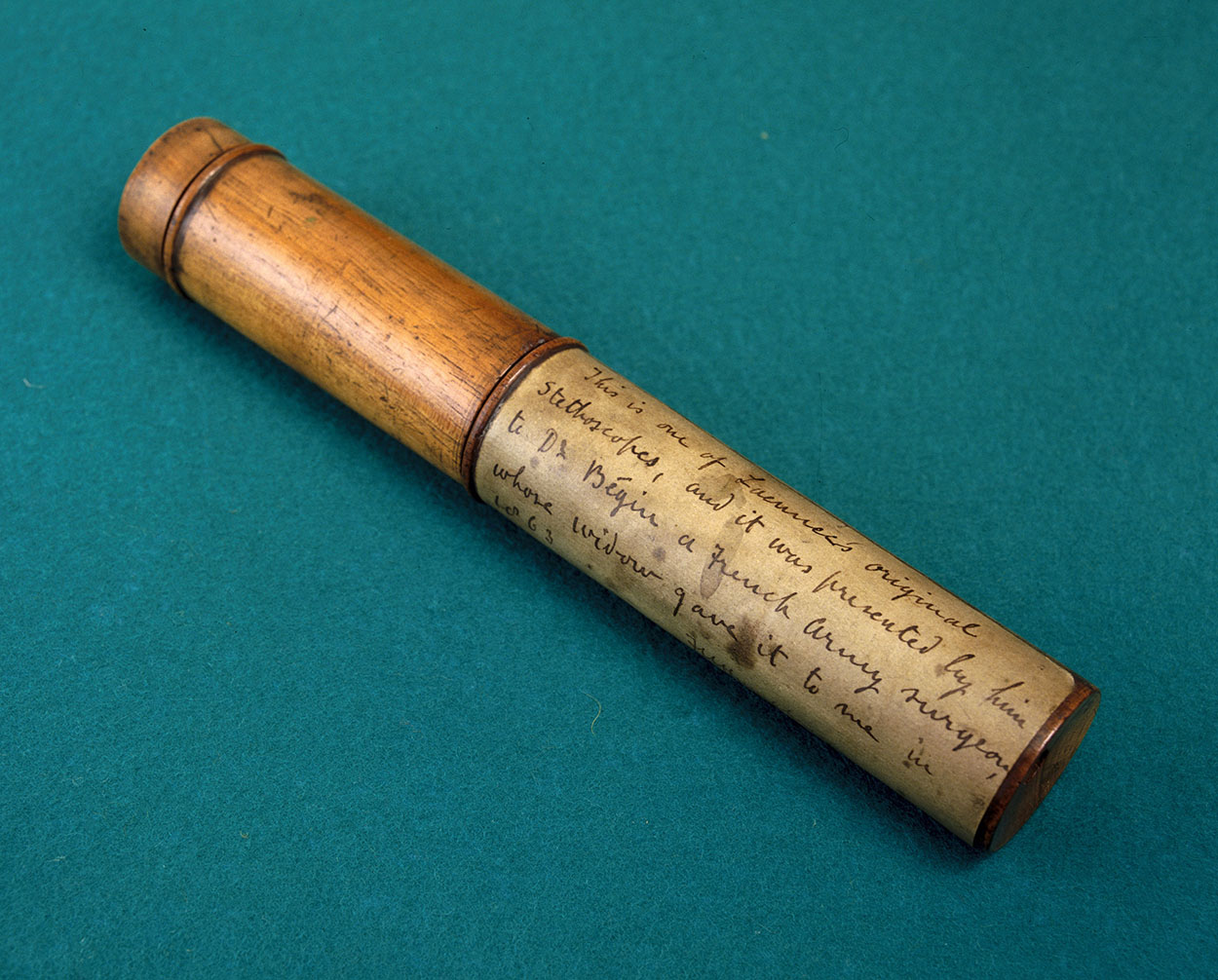
This early stethoscope belonged to Laennec. (Science Museum, London)

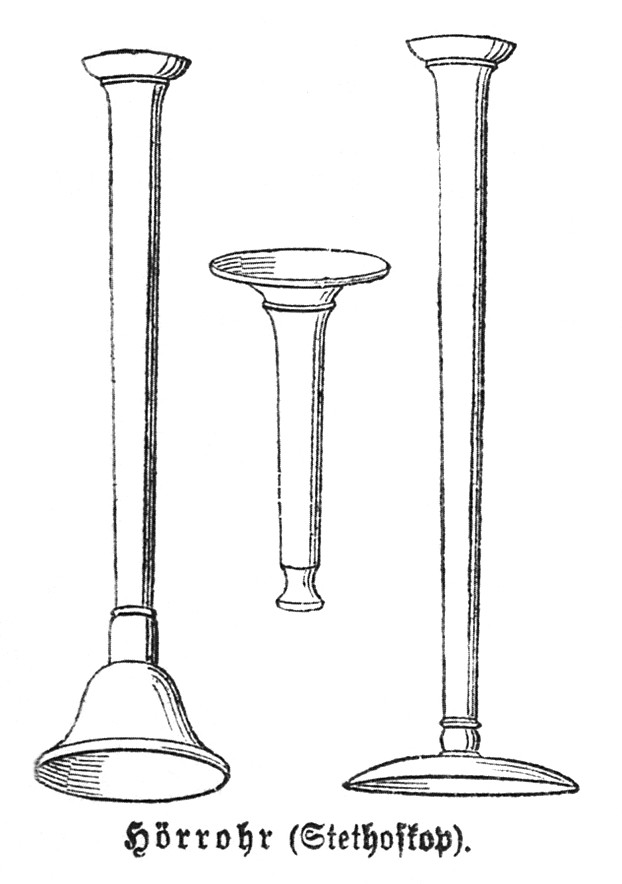
Early stethoscopes

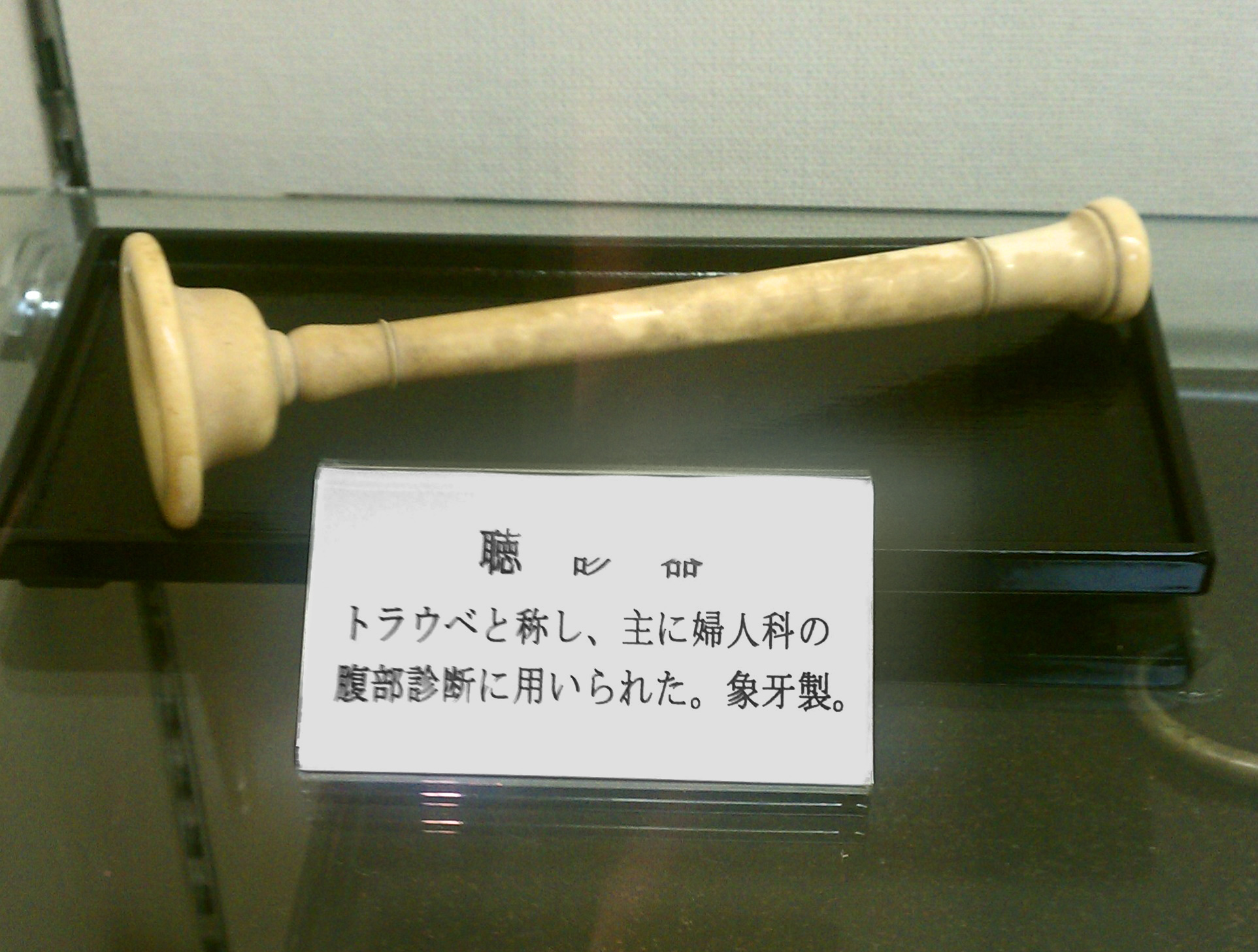
A Traube-type stethoscope in ivory

The stethoscope was invented in France in 1816 by René Laennec at the Necker-Enfants Malades Hospital in Paris. It consisted of a wooden tube and was monaural. Laennec invented the stethoscope because he was not comfortable placing his ear directly onto a woman's chest in order to listen to her heart. He observed that a rolled piece of paper, placed between the individual's chest and his ear, could amplify heart sounds without requiring physical contact. Laennec's device was similar to the common ear trumpet, a historical form of hearing aid; indeed, his invention was almost indistinguishable in structure and function from the trumpet, which was commonly called a "microphone". Laennec called his device the "stethoscope" (stetho- + -scope, "chest scope"), and he called its use "mediate auscultation", because it was auscultation with a tool intermediate between the individual's body and the physician's ear. (Today the word auscultation denotes all such listening, mediate or not.) The first flexible stethoscope of any sort may have been a binaural instrument with articulated joints not very clearly described in 1829. In 1840, Golding Bird described a stethoscope he had been using with a flexible tube. Bird was the first to publish a description of such a stethoscope, but he noted in his paper the prior existence of an earlier design (which he thought was of little utility) which he described as the snake ear trumpet. Bird's stethoscope had a single earpiece.

=== Binaural devices ===
In 1851, Irish physician Arthur Leared invented a binaural stethoscope. The following year, George Philip Cammann, a physician practicing in New York City, perfected for commercial production the design of a stethoscope that featured a plug for each ear. Although improvements have been made, his design has remained essentially unchanged ever since. Cammann also wrote a major treatise on diagnosis by auscultation, which the refined binaural stethoscope made possible. By 1873, there were descriptions of a differential stethoscope that could connect to slightly different locations to create a slight stereo effect, though this did not become a standard tool in clinical practice.

Somerville Scott Alison described his invention of the stethophone at the Royal Society in 1858; the stethophone had two separate bells, allowing the user to hear and compare sounds derived from two discrete locations. This was used to do definitive studies on binaural hearing and auditory processing that advanced knowledge of sound localization and eventually led to an understanding of binaural fusion.

The medical historian Jacalyn Duffin has argued that the invention of the stethoscope marked a major step in the redefinition of disease from being a bundle of symptoms, to the current sense of a disease as a problem with an anatomical system even if there are no observable symptoms. This re-conceptualization occurred in part, Duffin argues, because prior to stethoscopes, there were no non-lethal instruments for exploring internal anatomy.

Rappaport and Sprague designed a new stethoscope in the 1940s, which became the standard by which other stethoscopes are measured, consisting of two sides, one of which is used for the respiratory system, the other for the cardiovascular system. The Rappaport-Sprague model stethoscope was heavy and short (18–24 in (46–61 cm)) with an antiquated appearance recognizable by their two large independent latex rubber tubes connecting an exposed leaf-spring-joined pair of opposing F-shaped chrome-plated brass binaural ear tubes with a dual-head chest piece.

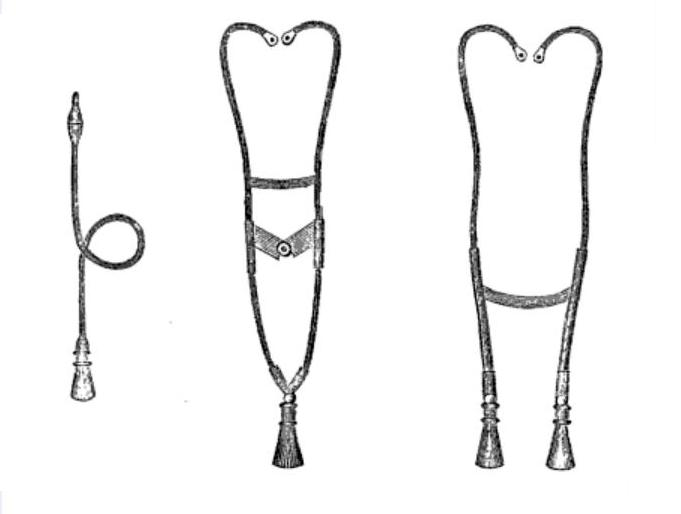
Early flexible tube stethoscopes. Golding Bird's instrument is on the left. The instrument on the right is the stethophone.

Several other minor refinements were made to stethoscopes until, in the early 1960s, David Littmann, a Harvard Medical School professor, created a new stethoscope that was lighter than previous models and had improved acoustics. In the late 1970s, 3M-Littmann introduced the tunable diaphragm: a very hard (G-10) glass-epoxy resin diaphragm member with an overmolded silicone flexible acoustic surround which permitted increased excursion of the diaphragm member in a Z-axis with respect to the plane of the sound collecting area. The left shift to a lower resonant frequency increases the volume of some low frequency sounds due to the longer waves propagated by the increased excursion of the hard diaphragm member suspended in the concentric accountic surround. Conversely, restricting excursion of the diaphragm by pressing the stethoscope diaphragm surface firmly against the anatomical area overlying the physiological sounds of interest, the acoustic surround could also be used to dampen excursion of the diaphragm in response to "z"-axis pressure against a concentric fret. This raises the frequency bias by shortening the wavelength to auscultate a higher range of physiological sounds.

In 1999, Richard Deslauriers patented the first external noise reducing stethoscope, the DRG Puretone. It featured two parallel lumens containing two steel coils which dissipated infiltrating noise as inaudible heat energy. The steel coil "insulation" added .30 lb to each stethoscope.

== Current practice ==
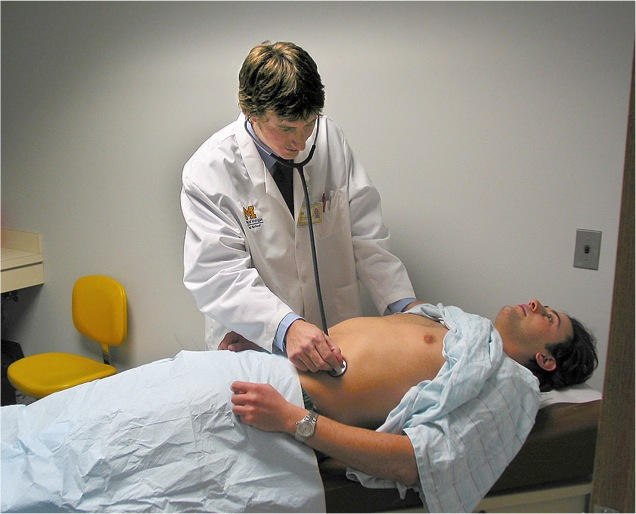
A doctor using a stethoscope on a patient's abdomen to listen to bowel sounds

Stethoscopes are a symbol of healthcare professionals. Healthcare providers are often seen or depicted wearing a stethoscope around the neck. A 2012 research paper claimed that the stethoscope, when compared to other medical equipment, had the highest positive impact on the perceived trustworthiness of the practitioner seen with it.

Prevailing opinions on the utility of the stethoscope in current clinical practice vary depending on the medical specialty. Studies have shown that auscultation skill (i.e., the ability to make a diagnosis based on what is heard through a stethoscope) has been in decline for some time, such that some medical educators are working to re-establish it.

In general practice, traditional blood pressure measurement using a mechanical sphygmomanometer with inflatable cuff and stethoscope is gradually being replaced with automated blood pressure monitors.

== Types ==
=== Acoustic ===
Parts of a binaural stethoscope

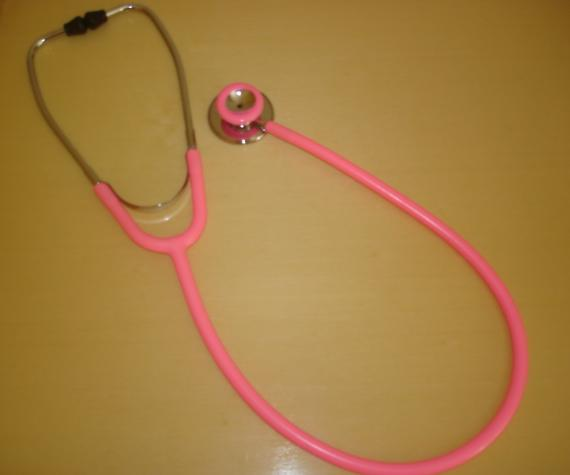
Acoustic stethoscope, with the bell upwards

Acoustic stethoscopes operate on the transmission of sound from the chest piece, via air-filled hollow tubes, to the listener's ears. The chestpiece usually consists of two sides that can be placed against the patient for sensing sound: a diaphragm (plastic disc) or bell (hollow cup). If the diaphragm is placed on the patient, body sounds vibrate the diaphragm, creating acoustic pressure waves which travel up the tubing to the listener's ears. If the bell is placed on the patient, the vibrations of the skin directly produce acoustic pressure waves traveling up to the listener's ears. The bell transmits low frequency sounds, while the diaphragm transmits higher frequency sounds. To deliver the acoustic energy primarily to either the bell or diaphragm, the tube connecting into the chamber between bell and diaphragm is open on only one side and can rotate. The opening is visible when connected into the bell. Rotating the tube 180 degrees in the head connects it to the diaphragm. This two-sided stethoscope was invented by Rappaport and Sprague in the early part of the 20th century.

=== Electronic ===
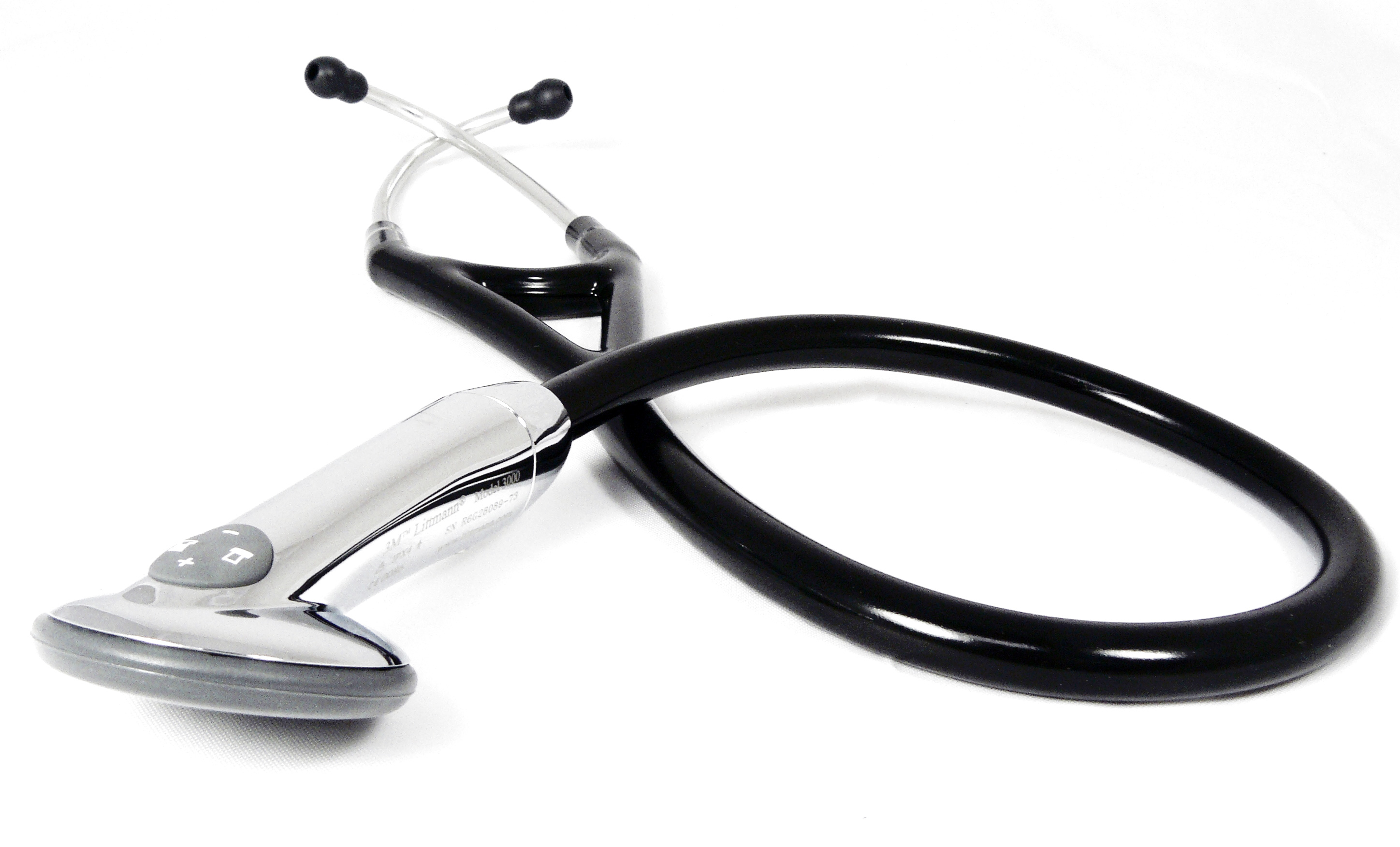
Electronic stethoscope

An electronic stethoscope (or stethophone) overcomes the low sound levels by electronically amplifying body sounds. However, amplification of stethoscope contact artifacts, and component cutoffs (frequency response thresholds of electronic stethoscope microphones, pre-amps, amps, and speakers) limit electronically amplified stethoscopes' overall utility by amplifying mid-range sounds, while simultaneously attenuating high- and low- frequency range sounds. Currently, a number of companies offer electronic stethoscopes. Electronic stethoscopes require conversion of acoustic sound waves to electrical signals which can then be amplified and processed for optimal listening. Unlike acoustic stethoscopes, which are all based on the same physics, transducers in electronic stethoscopes vary widely. The simplest and least effective method of sound detection is achieved by placing a microphone in the chestpiece. This method suffers from ambient noise interference and has fallen out of favor. Another method, used in Welch-Allyn's Meditron stethoscope, comprises placement of a piezoelectric crystal at the head of a metal shaft, the bottom of the shaft making contact with a diaphragm. 3M also uses a piezo-electric crystal placed within foam behind a thick rubber-like diaphragm. The Thinklabs' Rhythm 32 uses an electromagnetic diaphragm with a conductive inner surface to form a capacitive sensor. This diaphragm responds to sound waves, with changes in an electric field replacing changes in air pressure. The Eko Core enables wireless transmission of heart sounds to a smartphone or tablet. The Eko Duo can take electrocardiograms as well as echocardiograms. This enables clinicians to screen for conditions such as heart failure, which would not be possible with a traditional stethoscope.

Because the sounds are transmitted electronically, an electronic stethoscope can be a Wireless device, can be a recording device, and can provide noise reduction, signal enhancement, and both visual and audio output. Around 2001, Stethographics introduced PC-based software which enabled a phonocardiograph, graphic representation of cardiologic and pulmonologic sounds to be generated, and interpreted according to related algorithms. All of these features are helpful for purposes of telemedicine (remote diagnosis) and teaching.

Electronic stethoscopes are also used with computer-aided auscultation programs to analyze the recorded heart sounds pathological or innocent heart murmurs.

==== Recording ====
Some electronic stethoscopes feature direct audio output that can be used with an external recording device, such as a laptop or MP3 recorder. The same connection can be used to listen to the previously recorded auscultation through the stethoscope headphones, allowing for more detailed study for general research as well as evaluation and consultation regarding a particular patient's condition and telemedicine, or remote diagnosis.

There are some smartphone apps that can use the phone as a stethoscope. At least one uses the phone's own microphone to amplify sound, produce a visualization, and e-mail the results. These apps may be used for training purposes or as novelties, but have not yet gained acceptance for professional medical use.

The first stethoscope that could work with a smartphone application was introduced in 2015.

=== Fetal ===
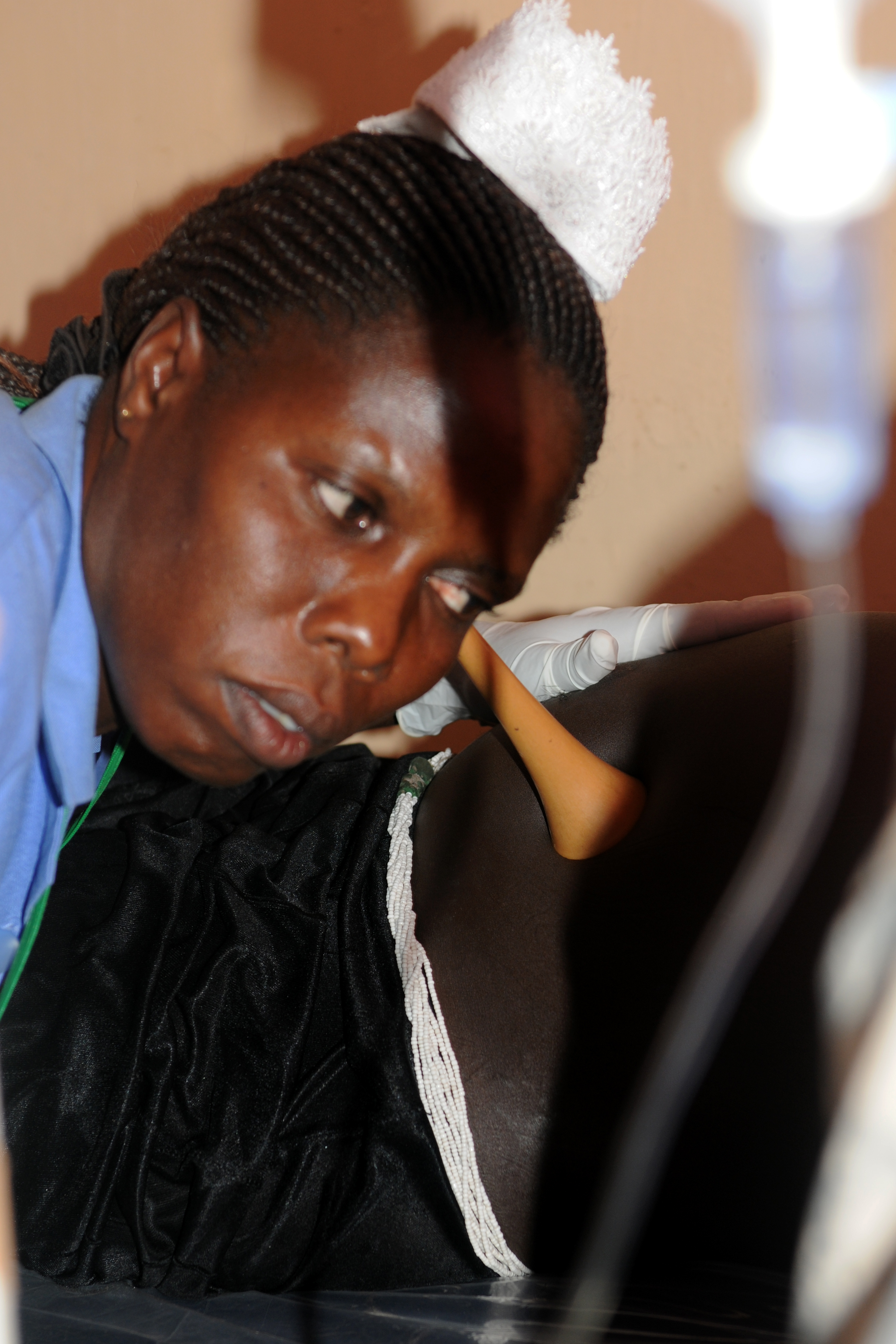
A Pinard horn used by a U.S. Army Reserve nurse in Uganda

A fetal stethoscope or fetoscope is an acoustic stethoscope shaped like a listening trumpet. It is placed against the abdomen of a pregnant woman to listen to the heart sounds of the fetus. The fetal stethoscope is also known as a Pinard horn after French obstetrician Adolphe Pinard (1844–1934).

=== Doppler ===
A Doppler stethoscope is an electronic device that measures the Doppler effect of ultrasound waves reflected from organs within the body. Motion is detected by the change in frequency, due to the Doppler effect, of the reflected waves. Hence the Doppler stethoscope is particularly suited to deal with moving objects such as a beating heart. It was recently demonstrated that continuous Doppler enables the auscultation of valvular movements and blood flow sounds that are undetected during cardiac examination with a stethoscope in adults. The Doppler auscultation presented a sensitivity of 84% for the detection of aortic regurgitations while classic stethoscope auscultation presented a sensitivity of 58%. Moreover, Doppler auscultation was superior in the detection of impaired ventricular relaxation. Since the physics of Doppler auscultation and classic auscultation are different, it has been suggested that both methods could complement each other. A military noise-immune Doppler based stethoscope has recently been developed for auscultation of patients in loud sound environments (up to 110 dB).

=== 3D-printed ===
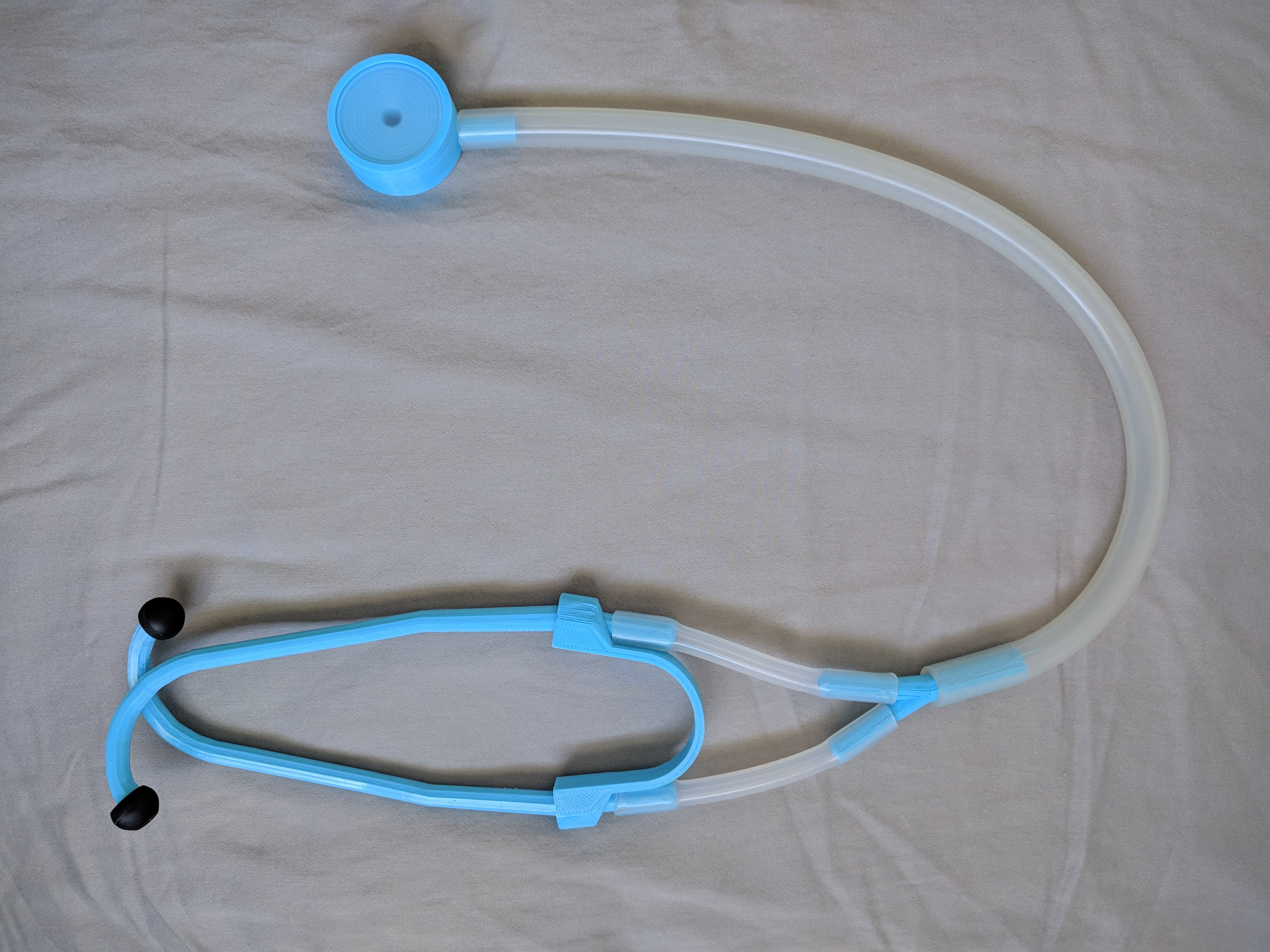
A 3D-printed stethoscope

A 3D-printed stethoscope is an open-source medical device meant for auscultation and manufactured via means of 3D printing. The 3D stethoscope was developed by Dr. Tarek Loubani and a team of medical and technology specialists. The 3D-stethoscope was developed as part of the Glia project, and its design is open source from the outset. The stethoscope gained widespread media coverage in Summer 2015.

The need for a 3D-stethoscope was borne out of a lack of stethoscopes and other vital medical equipment because of the blockade of the Gaza Strip, where Loubani, a Palestinian-Canadian, worked as an emergency physician during the 2012 conflict in Gaza. The 1960s-era Littmann Cardiology 3 stethoscope became the basis for the 3D-printed stethoscope developed by Loubani.

=== Esophageal ===
Prior to the 1960s, the esophageal stethoscope was a part of the routine intraoperative monitoring.

== Earpieces ==
Stethoscopes usually have rubber earpieces, which aid comfort and create a seal with the ear, improving the acoustic function of the device. Stethoscopes can be modified by replacing the standard earpieces with moulded versions, which improve comfort and transmission of sound. Moulded earpieces can be cast by an audiologist or made by the stethoscope user from a kit.

== See also ==
- Doppler fetal monitor
- Speaking tube
