= Digital Copyright =

2000 book by Jessica Litman

Digital Copyright: Protecting Intellectual Property on the Internet
- Author: Jessica Litman
- Language: English
- Subject: Digital Millennium Copyright Act
- Genre: Non-fiction
- Publisher: Prometheus Books
- Publication date: 2000

Digital Copyright: Protecting Intellectual Property on the Internet is a 2000 book by Jessica Litman detailing the legislative struggles over the passage of the Digital Millennium Copyright Act. It was widely reviewed and is generally cited as the definitive history of the DMCA's passage, as well as an exemplar of the lobbying and jockeying around passage of contemporary copyright legislation. Karen Coyle noted that:

this is not a law book, although it is about law. Digital Copyright is instead a social history of copyright law. It is not about the law per se but about how the technology developments of the 20th century changed how copyright law is crafted in the United States and who reaps the benefits.

The publisher, Prometheus Books, described the book in its blurb:

In 1998, copyright lobbyists succeeded in persuading Congress to enact laws greatly expanding copyright owners' control over the private uses of their works by individuals. The efforts to enforce these new rights have resulted in highly publicized legal battles between established media, including major record labels and motion picture studios, and upstart Internet companies such as MP3.com and Napster. The general public is used to thinking of copyright (if it thinks of it at all) as magical and arcane, and it hasn't paid much attention as legislation to expand copyright moved through Congress. But copyright law is central to our society's information policy, and affects what we can read, view, hear, use, or learn. In this enlightening and well-argued book, law professor Jessica Litman questions whether copyright laws crafted by lawyers and their lobbyists really make sense for the vast majority of us. Should every interaction between ordinary consumers and copyright-protected works be governed by laws drafted without ordinary consumers in mind? Is it practical to enforce such laws, or to expect consumers to obey them? Most important, what are the effects of such laws on the exchange of information in a free society? Litman's critique exposes the 1998 copyright law as incoherent. She argues for commonsense reforms that reflect the way people actually behave in their daily digital interactions.

The book includes an initial chapter on American copyright law (Chapter 1: "Copyright Basics"), and then the next several chapters focus on the legislative processes in US copyright law. Joseph Fogel, reviewing the book, wrote:

Litman's chapter on twentieth-century copyright law is wonderful. She criticizes negotiated copyright statutes as being unworkable. Congress, she recounts, relied upon private 'experts' to write copyright bills because the issues seemed to be the province of a very narrow slice of citizenry and thus not worthy of much of an elected official's time.

Beginning with chapter 10, Litman examines the aftermath of the enactment of the DMCA. Chapter 10, "The Copyright Wars", considers the use of digital rights management in the motion picture and music industries, including DeCSS on DVDs, and the lack of widespread adoption of a similar technology on music CDs. Litman reviews Universal City Studios v. Reimerdes and related cases, and for the music industry, UMG Recordings v. MP3.com, A&M Records v. Napster, Inc., and Recording Industry Association v. Diamond Multimedia. Comparing the industries' strategies, Litman notes:

By engaging in a scorched-earth campaign, the recording industry squandered some truly awesome assets. ... [It] ... was unwilling to commit itself to an insecure digital standard that might become entrenched. Instead, it fought about whose patented security algorithm would become the new standard, and it focused on herding all MP3 music off the Internet.

Chapter 11 continues this analysis, with some reflections on the relative value of litigation versus legislation as strategies for the content industries.

In Chapter 12, "Revising Copyright Law for the Digital Age", Litman reviews the overall approach to developing copyright laws, concluding that "If we are to devise a copyright law that meets the public's needs, we might most profitably abandon the copyright law's traditional reliance on reproduction, and refashion our measure of unlawful use to better incorporate the public's understanding of the copyright bargain."

In the 2006 edition, Litman included an updated foreword, which discussed in greater detail the peer-to-peer litigations that arose after the DMCA's enactment.

In 2017, Litman published a new edition of the book under a CC-BY-ND creative commons license through Maize Books. The 2017 edition includes a new postscript responding to some of the legal developments during the 19 years that followed Congress's enactment of the DMCA.

== Significant reviews ==
- Robert Bruen, "Review of Digital Copyright by Jessica Litman", IEEE Computer Society's Technical Committee on Security and Privacy, Cipher (May 27, 2001)
- Eric Bryant, Library Journal, v.126, n.10, p. 190 (June 1, 2001)
- Karen Coyle, "Book Review: Digital Copyright: Protecting Intellectual Property on the Internet", Information Technology & Libraries, Dec. 2001, pp. 220–222.
- DMCA Copyright Enforcement, "copyright protection, Digital Copyright", Science Knowledge and Technology Newsletter, American Sociological Association (2002).
- Joseph S. Fogel, Review of Digital Copyright, Los Angeles Lawyer, v.24, n.9 (Dec. 2001), pp. 44–46.
- Jane C. Ginsburg, "Can Copyright Become User-Friendly? Essay Review of Jessica Litman, Digital Copyright", Columbia-VLA Journal of Law & Arts, v.25, n.1 (2001).
- Lev Ginsburg, "A Writing On Copyright: Jessica Litman's Digital Copyright (2001)", UCLA Journal of Law & Technology, number 3 (2001).
- Mike Godwin, "Copywrong: Why the Digital Millennium Copyright Act hurts the public interest" (review of Digital Copyright by Jessica Litman), Reason, July 2001.
- Timothy Hensley, "Review Jessica Litman, Digital Copyright", College & Research Libraries, v.62, n.6 (Nov. 2001), pp. 590–591.
- Laura Hodes, "The DMCA, the Death of Napster, and the Digital Age: A Review of Jessica Litman's Digital Copyright", Findlaw, July 20, 2001.
- J. Ryan Miller, "Digital Copyright by Jessica Litman", Marquette Intellectual Property Law Review, v.5, n.1, pp. 257–261 (2001).
- David Pitt, Booklist
- Review of Digital Copyright, SlashDot (May 22, 2001).

== See also ==
- Digital Millennium Copyright Act
