= Jessica Litman =

American legal academic

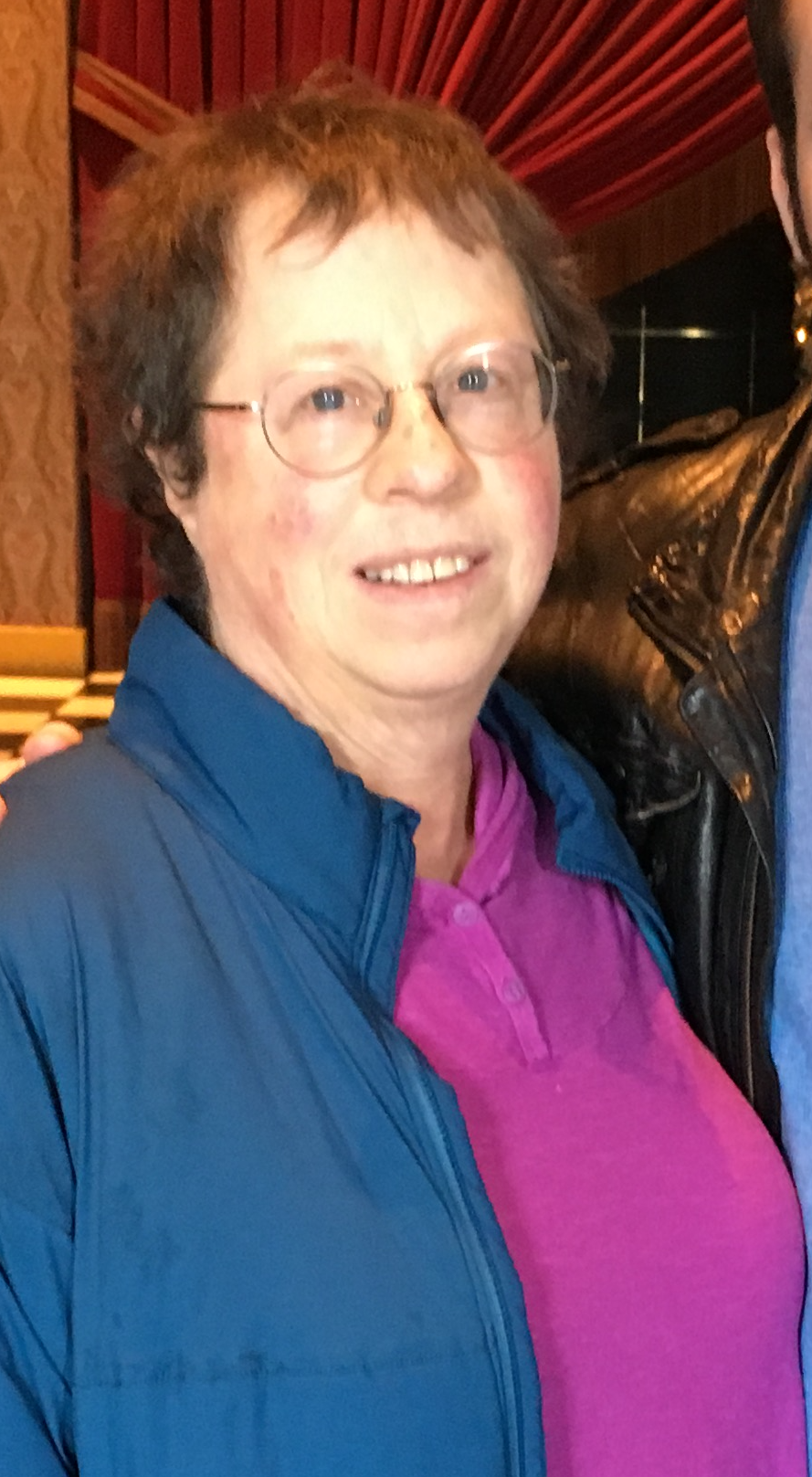
Jessica Litman

Jessica Litman is an American lawyer specializing in intellectual property law.

== Early life and education ==
Litman is from Pittsburgh. She graduated from Reed College, received an MFA from Southern Methodist University, and received a JD from Columbia Law School. After law school, she served as a law clerk to Judge Betty Fletcher on the United States Court of Appeals for the Ninth Circuit.

== Career ==
Litman was appointed John F. Nickoll Professor of Law at the University of Michigan Law School in 2018, after having been a law professor at Wayne State University Law School from 1990 to 2006 and University of Michigan Law from 1984 to 1990. She has also taught at New York University and the University of Tokyo. Her original appointment to the Michigan Law faculty was only the fourth to that faculty of a woman. According to Brian Leiter, as of 2007 she was one of the most-cited U.S. law professors in the field of intellectual property/cyberlaw.

Litman has testified before Congress multiple times. According to digital libraries expert Karen Coyle, Litman’s 1994 testimony before the Working Group on Intellectual Property of the White House Information Infrastructure Task Force “leapt from the page like some minor miracle of truth and justice.”

Litman is a 2006 recipient of Public Knowledge’s IP3 award, awarded each year for significant contribution the intellectual property field. She is an elected member of the American Law Institute and an adviser to that body’s Restatement of the Law, Copyright. She serves on the advisory board of Cyberspace Law Abstracts, and is a member of the International Advisory Board of I/S: A Journal of Law and Policy for the Information Society. She has served as a trustee of the Copyright Society of the U.S.A., as a member of the advisory councils of both Public Knowledge and the Future of Music Coalition, and as chair of the Association of American Law Schools Section on Intellectual Property. She served on the Intellectual Property and Internet Committee of the ACLU. She served on the Program Committee of the 13th Annual Conference on Computers, Freedom & Privacy, and the organizing committee of the 25th Telecommunications Policy Research Conference. She was a member of the National Research Council's Committee on Partnerships in Weather and Climate Services.

In 2021, Litman gave keynote speeches at conferences at Stanford and Cardozo law schools.

== Publications ==
Litman is the author of Digital Copyright: Protecting Intellectual Property on the Internet (2001), which explores the events leading to the passage of the Digital Millennium Copyright Act. The book's third edition was published in open-access form in 2017. She is also the co-author, with Jane Ginsburg and Mary Lou Kevlin, of the casebook Trademarks and Unfair Competition Law: Cases and Materials.

== Personal life ==
Litman's brother, Harry Litman, is a lawyer, law professor, and political commentator. Her mother was Roslyn Litman, a civil rights advocate and antitrust attorney.
