= Roslyn Litman =

American lawyer and civil libertarian

Roslyn Litman (September 30, 1928 - October 4, 2016) was an American attorney. In 1966 she negotiated a settlement with the National Basketball Association on behalf of blackballed player Connie Hawkins on the basis of antitrust. In her first appearance before the U.S. Supreme Court in 1989, she successfully argued to remove a nativity scene from display in the Allegheny County courthouse in Pittsburgh, Pennsylvania.

== Early life and education ==
Litman was born Eta Roslyn Margolis on Sept. 30, 1928, in Brooklyn, to Ukrainian Jewish immigrants Harry and Dorothy Perlow Margolis. She had an older sister, Ruth. Her father was a clothing salesman and her mother a milliner. Litman attended Erasmus Hall High School. After she had graduated high school, the family moved to Western Pennsylvania.

Litman attended the University of Pittsburgh, where she met her husband-to-be, S. David Litman, who was in law school there. She received a bachelor's degree in 1949, started law school, and graduated in 1952 first in her class. She joined the ACLU while in law school.

== Career ==
Litman was rejected by major law firms because she was a woman, so she and her husband formed their own firm.

One of Litman's first cases was arguing the right of the American Nazi Party to demonstrate in Pittsburgh.

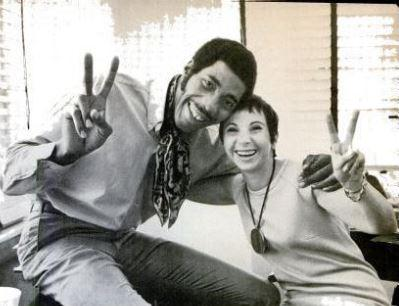
Roz Litman in 1969 with her client, Connie Hawkins, celebrating the settlement of his case against the NBA

Litman and her husband, fellow lawyer S. David Litman, sued the National Basketball Association on antitrust grounds in 1966 on behalf of Connie Hawkins. Despite his prodigious skills, Hawkins was blackballed from playing in the NBA because of ill-founded rumors of involvement with gambling while in college. The suit alleged that the NBA refused to allow any team to hire Hawkins, who at the time was playing for the Harlem Globetrotters. The league agreed to a $1.3M settlement in 1969, and Hawkins was signed by the Phoenix Suns. He was later inducted into the Basketball Hall of Fame.

In 1989, Litman successfully argued before the U.S. Supreme Court on behalf of the ACLU of Pennsylvania to remove a nativity scene from display in the Allegheny County courthouse in Pittsburgh, Pennsylvania. Litman served for some three decades on the ACLU's national board of directors, including as one of the board's five "general counsel."

Litman and other members of a team of lawyers won a settlement of $415M, a record in 1991, from Continental Can Company, which the team had argued had laid off 3000 workers to avoid pension liabilities.

== Personal life ==
Litman married S. David Litman; the couple had three children, including Harry Litman and Jessica Litman.

Her husband died in 1996. Litman died of pancreatic cancer in Pittsburgh on October 4, 2016. She was 88.
