= Harry Litman =

American lawyer and commentator (born 1958)

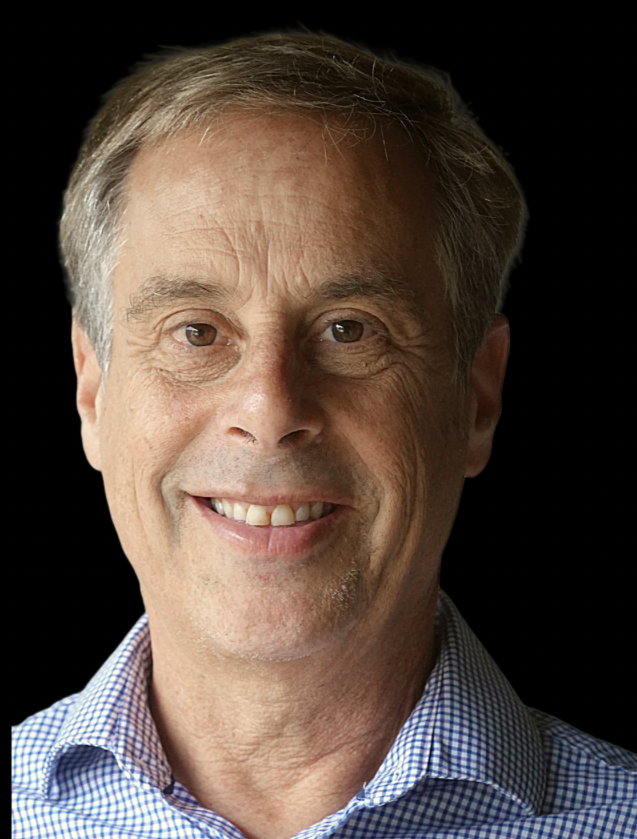
- Litman in 2023

United States Attorney for the Western District of Pennsylvania
- In office 1998–2001
- President: Bill Clinton
- Preceded by: Frederick Thieman
- Succeeded by: Mary Beth Buchanan

Personal details
- Born: c. 1958 (age 67–68)
- Party: Democratic
- Relatives: Roslyn Litman (mother); Jessica Litman (sister)
- Education: Harvard University (BA); University of California, Berkeley (JD)

Harry P. Litman (born c. 1958) is an American lawyer, law professor, and political commentator. He is a former U.S. attorney and deputy assistant attorney general. He has provided commentary in print and broadcast news, and produces the Talking Feds podcast. He is a senior fellow at USC's Annenberg Center on Communication Leadership and Policy. He has taught in several law schools and schools of public policy.

Litman served as a law clerk to Abner Mikva, Thurgood Marshall, and Anthony Kennedy. His practice specialties have included false claims law and whistleblower law.

== Early life and education ==
Harry P. Litman was born around 1958. He grew up in the Shadyside neighborhood of Pittsburgh, Pennsylvania and was a presidential scholar graduating from high school in 1976. Both of his parents, Roslyn Litman and S. David Litman, were lawyers as well as civil liberties advocates. He attended the Tree of Life Synagogue in Pittsburgh as a youth.

He received his Bachelor of Arts degree from Harvard College in 1980. After graduating, he worked as a sports reporter for the Associated Press, and as a production assistant for feature films. He received his Juris Doctor degree from the University of California at Berkeley in Berkeley in 1986, where he was editor-in-chief of the California Law Review, and graduated Order of the Coif.

== Career ==
Litman served as a law clerk to Abner Mikva of the U.S. Court of Appeals for the D.C. Circuit, and Supreme Court Justices Thurgood Marshall and Anthony Kennedy during the 1987 and 1988 terms.

After his clerkships, Litman became an Assistant United States Attorney for the Northern District of California. While an Assistant U.S. Attorney, he was detailed to the Department of Justice's main office in Washington, D.C. to work on several national cases, including the federal re-prosecution of the Los Angeles police officers in the Rodney King case.

From 1993 to 1998, he was a Deputy Assistant Attorney General in the Department of Justice under Janet Reno, coordinating the department's work on a number of issues and advising the Attorney General and other officials on questions of constitutional law and prosecutorial policy. Simultaneously, he was a Special Assistant U.S. Attorney for the Eastern District of Virginia. In that capacity, he was co-counsel for Operation Underhand, prosecuting a narcotics ring that smuggled drugs into prison under the guise of providing religious counseling. In 1998, he was appointed U.S. Attorney for the Western District of Pennsylvania by President Bill Clinton.

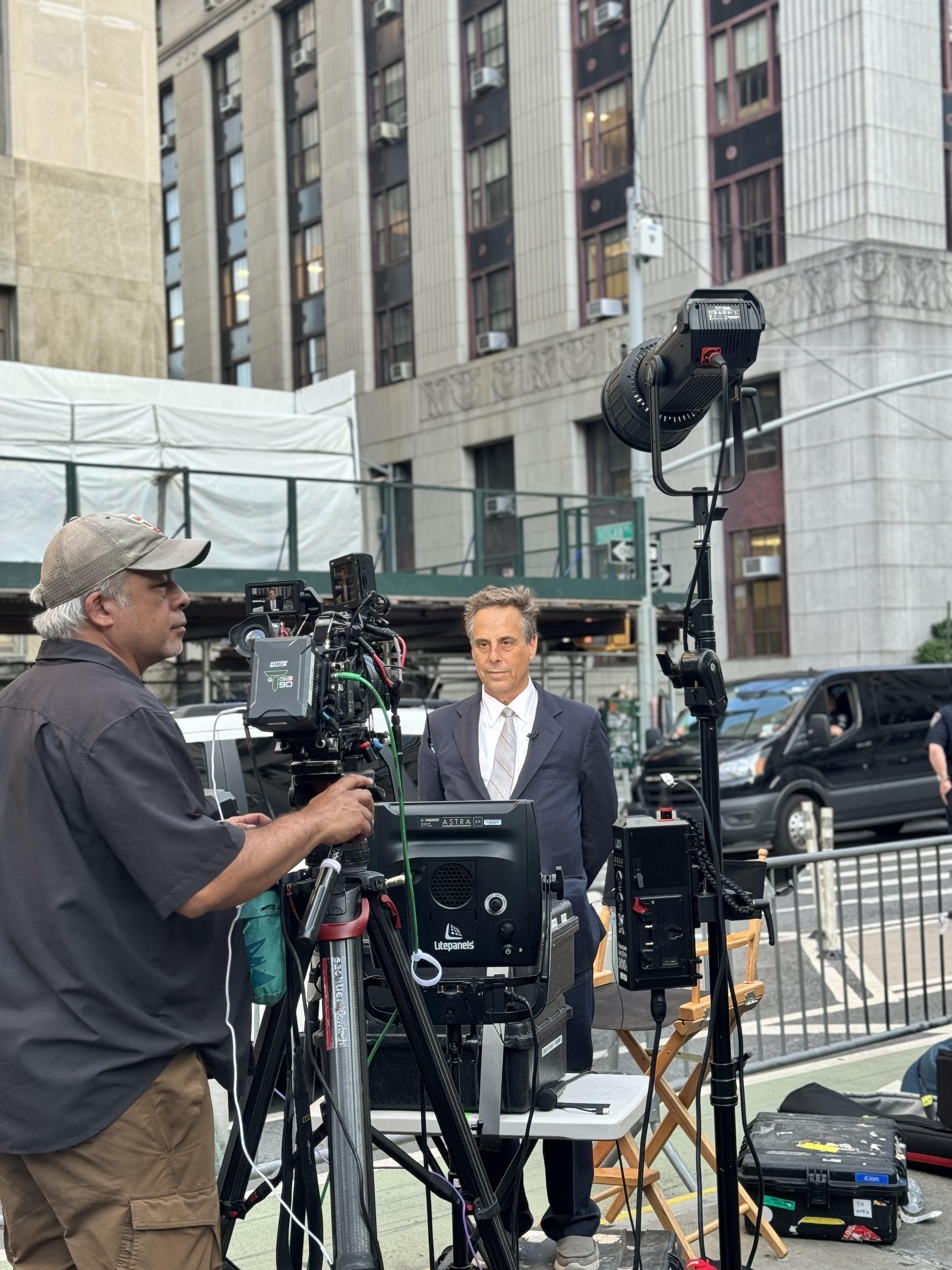
Litman commenting live on MSNBC from the 2024 Trump trial in Manhattan, New York

Litman in 2000 personally litigated a gun trafficking case under Operation Target.In July 2000, Clinton nominated Litman for a judgeship on the United States District Court for the Western District of Pennsylvania, but the Senate adjourned without considering the nomination. While in government, Litman taught at Berkeley Law School in Berkeley, California, Georgetown Law School in Washington D.C., and the University of Pittsburgh School of Law in Pittsburgh.

Litman developed a nationally-recognized gun-violence reduction initiative known as Operation Target, and personally litigated cases in the district court and the court of appeals. A Democrat, Litman was the Pennsylvania state counsel to the Kerry-Edwards campaign in 2004, and post-election counsel for Western Pennsylvania to the Obama-Biden presidential campaign in 2008.

After leaving government, Litman was appointed a Distinguished Visitor and Fellow to the Program in Law and Public Policy at Princeton University's School of Public and International Affairs. As of 2024, he is associated with Whistleblower Partners.

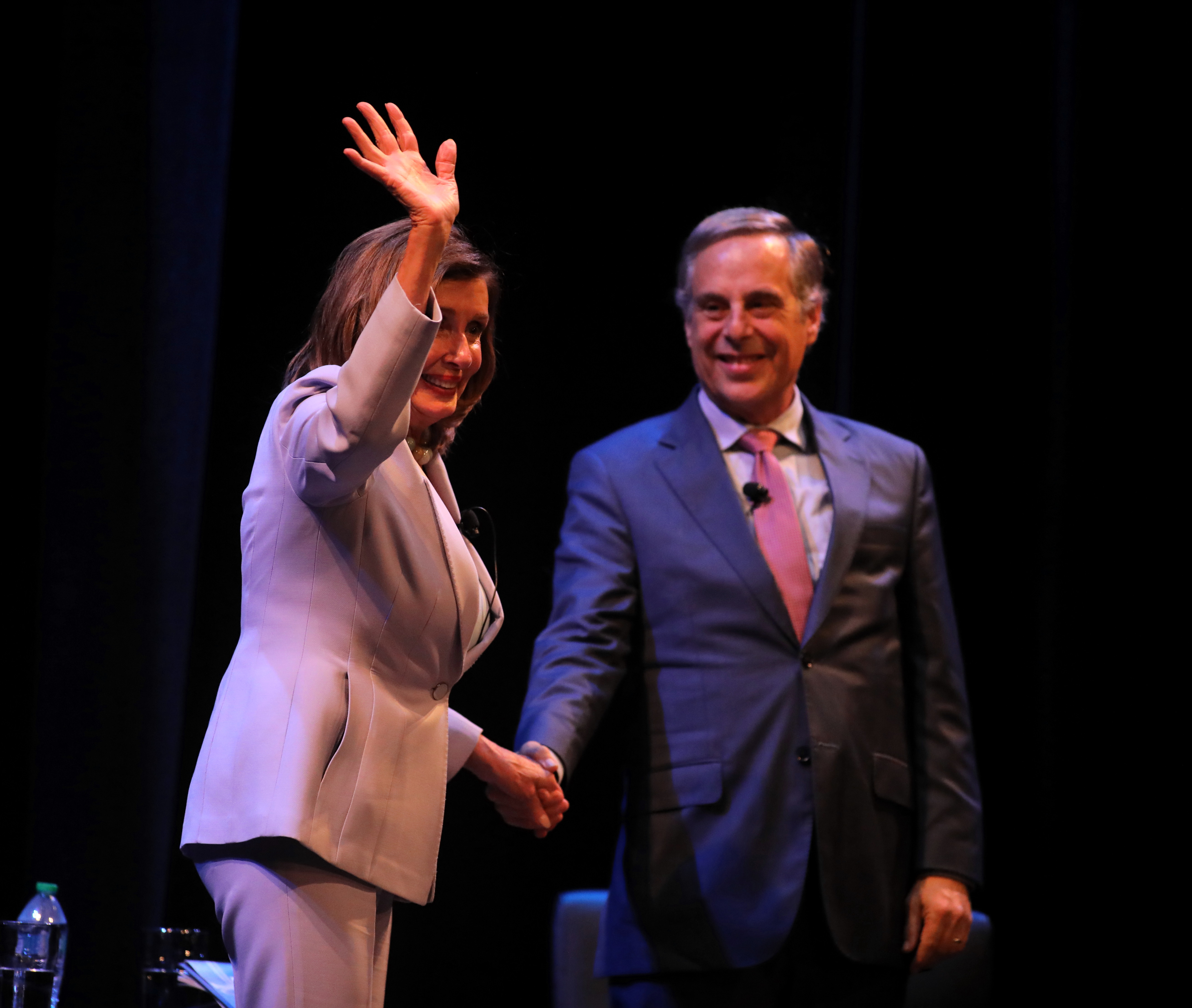
Nancy Pelosi and Harry Litman at a "Talking San Diego" event, October 2024

== Other activities ==
=== Legal commentary ===
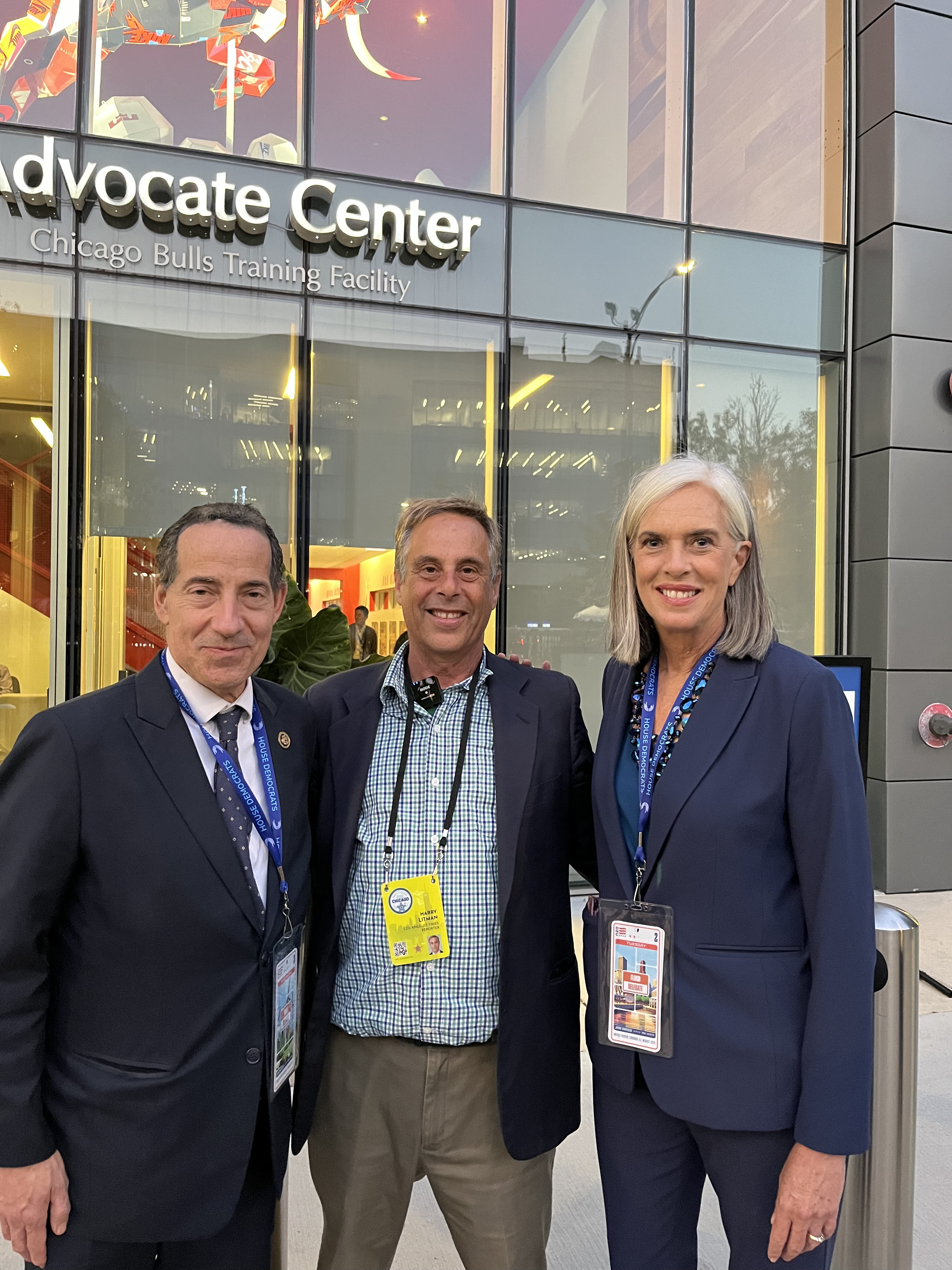
Litman (center) at the DNC with Representative Jamie Raskin (left) and Democratic Whip Katherine Clark (right)

He has contributed opinion commentary to the Los Angeles Times, The New York Times, The Atlantic, The Washington Post, The Wall Street Journal, CNN, and Lawfare (Lawfare Project).

Litman was the Senior Legal Columnist for the LA Times' op-ed section from 2021 until he resigned in 2024. His resignation was in protest over the LA Times' leadership currying favor with President-elect Trump. The resignation triggered widespread national and international coverage. He is a regular commentator on legal issues for cable television networks including MSNBC, CNN, and Fox News. Litman also provides legal and political analysis on BBC News, National Public Radio (NPR), and France 24.

=== Notable cases in private practice ===
Litman was lead counsel for the whistleblower in Washington v. EDMC, a False Claims Act case against a for-profit education chain. The case resulted in the largest settlement ever in an FCA case involving the U.S. Department of Education.^{[9]}

He was counsel for Richard Cordray, then director of the Consumer Financial Protection Bureau, in contemplated litigation against President Trump to prevent Cordray's termination. Litman represented Pittsburgh Mayor Thomas J. Murphy Jr. in a successful effort to prevent indictment on federal charges.^{[10]} He served as co-counsel by appointment of the Department of Justice in two cases before the U.S. Supreme Court.

=== Teaching ===
As of 2018, Litman taught constitutional law and national security law at UCLA School of Law and the University of California, San Diego School of Political Science. He previously taught at Berkeley Law School, Georgetown Law School in Washington, D.C., University of Pittsburgh School of Law in Pittsburgh, Pennsylvania, Princeton University's School of Public Policy, Rutgers University–Camden Law School, and Duquesne University in Pittsburgh.

As of September 2024 Litman is a senior fellow at USC's Annenberg Center on Communication Leadership and Policy.

=== Civic Activities ===
Litman serves on the Regional Leadership Councils of the Brady Campaign in addition to the boards of the Constitutional Accountability Center and the Jewish Healthcare Foundation.

=== Talking Feds podcast ===
In March 2019, Litman launched the podcast Talking Feds, a round-table of former federal officials talking about the legal issues of the day. He serves as host and executive producer.

In March 2020, Marie Claire named it the second-best political podcast in the U.S. in preparing listeners to decide how to vote in the upcoming presidential election. In October 2024 the podcast won a Silver Award at the W3 Awards and a Silver Signal Award. In May 2025 the podcast was named a Webby Award Honoree.

Talking Feds is the only podcast honored with all three awards: a Webby Honoree, a Signal Award, and a W3 Award.

== Recognition ==
As of 2023 Litman was listed in "Best Lawyers of America" in the categories "Commercial Litigation", "White Collar Criminal Defense", and "Qui Tam Law".

== Personal life ==
Litman's wife is Julie Roskies Litman, a mathematician and jiu jitsu competitor; they have three children. His sister, Jessica Litman, is a lawyer and copyright scholar at the University of Michigan in Ann Arbor. His mother was attorney Roslyn Litman and he is a member of the Democratic Party.

== See also ==
- List of Jewish American jurists
- List of law clerks for the first seat of the Supreme Court of the United States
- List of law clerks for the tenth seat of the Supreme Court of the United States
