= Eric Litman =

American entrepreneur and angel investor (born 1973)

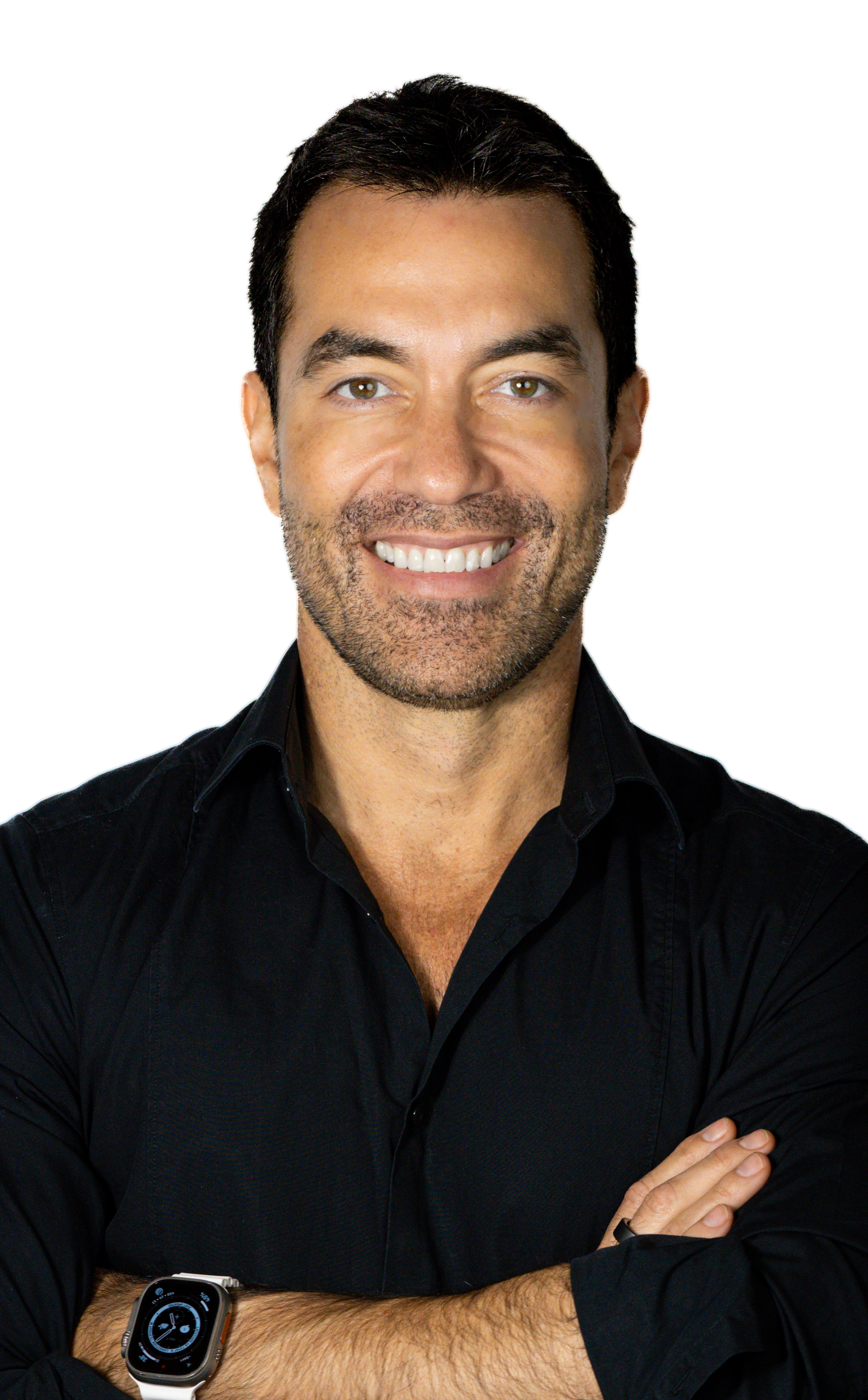
- Born: August 1, 1973 (age 53)
- Occupations: CEO and founder
- Known for: Entrepreneurship, advocating technology
- Website: aescape.com

Eric Austin Litman (born August 1, 1973) is an American entrepreneur and angel investor, and former CEO of the robotics health technology company, Aescape, inc. He co-founded Proxicom, built Viaduct from a one-man shop through a merger with the Wolf Group and was the founder and CEO of Medialets, a mobile ad serving and advertising analytics company acquired by WPP plc.

He has been profiled and quoted by The Wall Street Journal, Forbes, Wired, and Fast Company; was named a 2010 Game Changer by New York Enterprise Report, and in 2011 was called one of the "best operators in online advertising" by TechCrunch

== Early life and education ==
Litman was born in Los Angeles and grew up on Saint Thomas, one of the United States Virgin Islands where he graduated from high school at 15. He attended the University of Maryland, College Park in College Park northwest of Landover, Maryland.

== Career ==
=== Beginning in business ===
While in college, he worked in pre-sales support and engineering at NeXT, the start-up founded by Apple CEO Steve Jobs. Litman went on to be a senior systems engineer for Digicon, building secure, distributed networks, and applications for the U.S. Department of Defense.

=== Proxicom ===
Litman and three other colleagues from Digicon founded Proxicom in 1991. Proxicom, one of the first-generation Internet professional services agencies, went public on NASDAQ in 1998 and was sold to the global consultancy Dimension Data after a bidding war against Compaq (prior to Compaq's merger with Hewlett-Packard).

=== Viaduct ===
After Proxicom, Litman founded Viaduct Technologies, an interactive agency and was its CEO. Viaduct was acquired by Wolf Group in 2000. After the acquisition Litman stayed as Viaduct's chief operating officer.

=== WashingtonVC ===
Litman was the managing director of WashingtonVC, an early stage venture capital fund in Washington, DC, where he focused on investments in online media, consumer Internet and telecommunications. He conceptualized and launched Aux Interactive in March, 2008. He left WashingtonVC in May, 2008.

=== Medialets ===
Litman founded Medialets, a mobile ad serving, attribution and measurement provider in 2008. In April, 2015, Medialets was acquired by WPP plc, the world's largest advertising company, where he was the senior vice president of Mobile Worldwide until April 2017.

=== Aescape ===
In May 2017, Litman founded Aescape, inc., a robotics health technology company focused on building intuitive massage therapy experiences designed to help people of all walks of life feel and live better and longer which counts as investors Peter Wurman, the co-founder of Kiva Systems (now Amazon Robotics), Fabrice Grinda of FJ Labs, Seth Levine and Brad Feld of Foundry Group, NBA championship player Matthew Dellavedova, Shane Feldberg, and others.
