= Ina Lettmann =

Lattmann Ina International Fashion and entrepreneur

- Born: 17 February 1977 (age 49); Recklinghausen, Germany
- Occupations: Entrepreneur, model, jewelry designer
- Years active: 1996–present
- Modeling information
- Height: 5 ft 10 in (1.78 m)
- Agency: NEXT Model Management

Ina Lettmann (born 17 February 1977) is an International German fashion model and entrepreneur, that was born in Recklinghausen, Germany. She has appeared in many International fashion events and modeled for the fashion houses such as Hermes, La Perla and Wolford and is seen as one of Europe's top models.

She has appeared in many fashion magazines throughout her career and has featured on the cover of Elle Magazine, Marie Claire, and Harper's Bazaar. Lettmann has featured in various ad campaigns throughout her career for Balenciaga, Dior, Dolce & Gabbana and Givenchy.

== Education ==
Lettmann graduated from Paris-Sorbonne University, achieving a degree in Fashion Design & Merchandising.

== Career ==
Lettmann stated in an interview that she started modeling at the age of 16. She was first discovered in New York City at the age of 17 by Ford Models, which resulted in her moving from Germany to Paris at the age of 19 on her own to pursue her modeling career. In 2003, after working for a number of years in Paris, Lettmann worked on the Dunhill worldwide campaign with Mathias Vriens as photographer.

During her early career, she was nicknamed "Angel Face with endless legs." Lettmann went on to work with some of the best fashion houses in Europe and runway work in London, Milan, New York City and Paris. During this period she worked in various roles for Victoria's Secret, Prada, Louis Vuitton and L'Oreal. She spent the majority of her career working for NEXT Model Management. Since 2010, she has featured in a number of ads for Dinsko.com. Lettmann has also worked in print for La Perla and Victoria's Secret.

Following her various work for a number of fashion houses, she worked on an International advertising campaign with Helmut Newton. In 2011, she went on to feature on the cover of Newton's book, Polaroids. Featuring on the cover of Polaroids led Lettmann to receive coverage in the Miami magazine.

== Jewelry ==
Aside from Lettmann's career as a model she is also involved in jewelry design. Her style is said to vintage inspired, mixing antique gold with diamonds along with other gems. Lettmann's inspiration for jewelry design is said to come from the 1960s and 1970s fashion eras. Her jewelry collection franchise is called Violet & Grace and is based in Miami, Florida, where she resides. Violet & Grace also stock Ela Stone and Iosselliani jewelry and previously stocked Alexander McQueen jewelry.
