= David Littmann =

American cardiologist

- Born: July 28, 1906; Chelsea, Massachusetts, U.S.
- Died: January 1, 1981 (aged 74); Boston, Massachusetts, U.S.
- Resting place: Sharon Memorial Park, Sharon, Massachusetts, U.S.

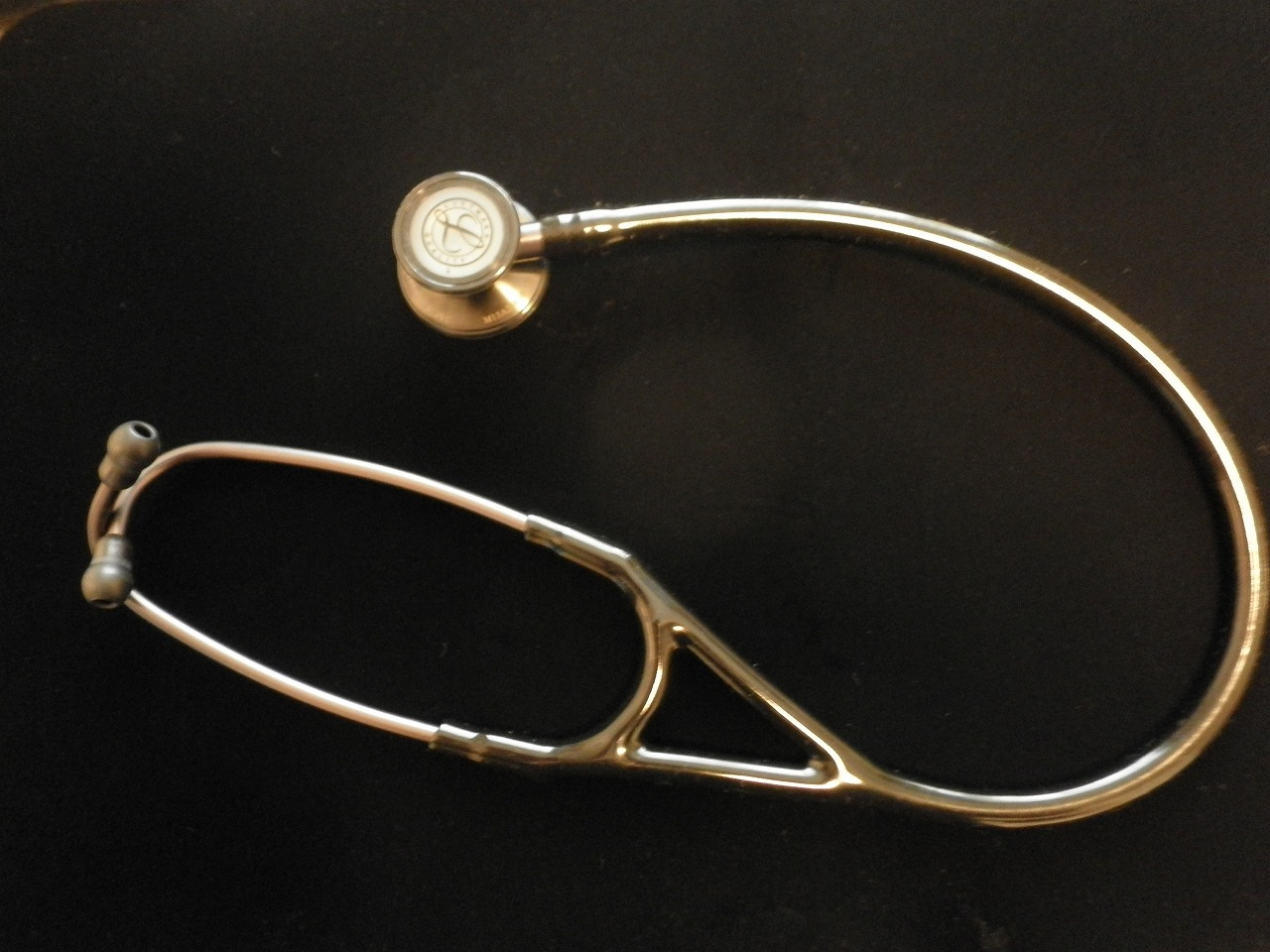
A Littmann stethoscope

David Littmann (July 28, 1906 – January 1, 1981) was an American cardiologist and Harvard Medical School professor and researcher. The name Littmann is well known in the medical field for the patented Littmann Stethoscope reputed for its acoustic performances for auscultation.

Littman was born on July 28, 1906, in Chelsea, Massachusetts. His parents, Isaac Litman and Sadie Zewat Litman, were Ukrainian immigrants from Novgorod.

With Gustev Machlup, Littmann founded Cardiosonics, Inc. to sell his stethoscopes. At that time the stethoscope line consisted of two key models, the doctor's stethoscope and the nurse's stethoscope.

3M acquired the stethoscope company on April 1, 1967, and hired Littmann as a consultant. 3M currently produces the range of Littmann brand stethoscopes.

The 1960s-era Littman Cardiology 3 stethoscope, which is out of patent, became the basis of a 3D-printed stethoscope developed by Tarek Loubani and a team of medical and technology specialists as part of the open source Glia project.

Littmann's son was jazz drummer Peter Littman (1935–1985).
