= David Litman =

David Litman was an American-French, born in New York in 1957, he lived in the UK from 1967 to 1975. He attended Sussex House School from 1965 to 1970 and City of London School from 1970 to 1975. He is a graduate of Cornell University (1979) and Cornell Law School (1982).

In 1991 David Litman, along with Bob Diener, founded Hotel Reservations Network (HRN), which later became Hotels.com in 2001. He was voted as the best performing lodging industry CEO of 2002. Litman sold the company to IAC in 2003.

In 2009, Litman and Bob Diener launched Getaroom.com, a hotel booking site. Litman currently co-chairs the Texas Business for Clean Air with Garrett Boone, founder of Dallas-based the Container Store.
