= Orsellinate-depside hydrolase =

Class of enzymes

Identifiers
- EC no.: 3.1.1.40
- CAS no.: 62213-12-1

Databases
- BRENDA: enzyme data
- ExPASy: NiceZyme view
- KEGG: enzyme entry
- MetaCyc: metabolic pathway
- Rhea: reactions
- PDB structures: RCSB PDB PDBe PDBsum
- Gene Ontology: AmiGO / QuickGO
Search
- PMC: articles
- PubMed: articles
- NCBI: proteins

Orsellinate-depside hydrolase (EC 3.1.1.40) is an enzyme that catalyzes the reaction

lecanoric acid
H_{2}O
H_{2}O
2
orsellinic acid

The enzyme characterised from the lichen Lasallia pustulata hydrolyses lecanoric acid to its monomer, orsellinic acid. The reaction is reversible and immobilised enzyme can thus be used to produce depsides.

This enzyme is a hydrolase, specifically one acting on carboxylic ester bonds. The systematic name is orsellinate-depside hydrolase. This enzyme is also called lecanorate hydrolase.
