= Libéral Bruant =

French architect

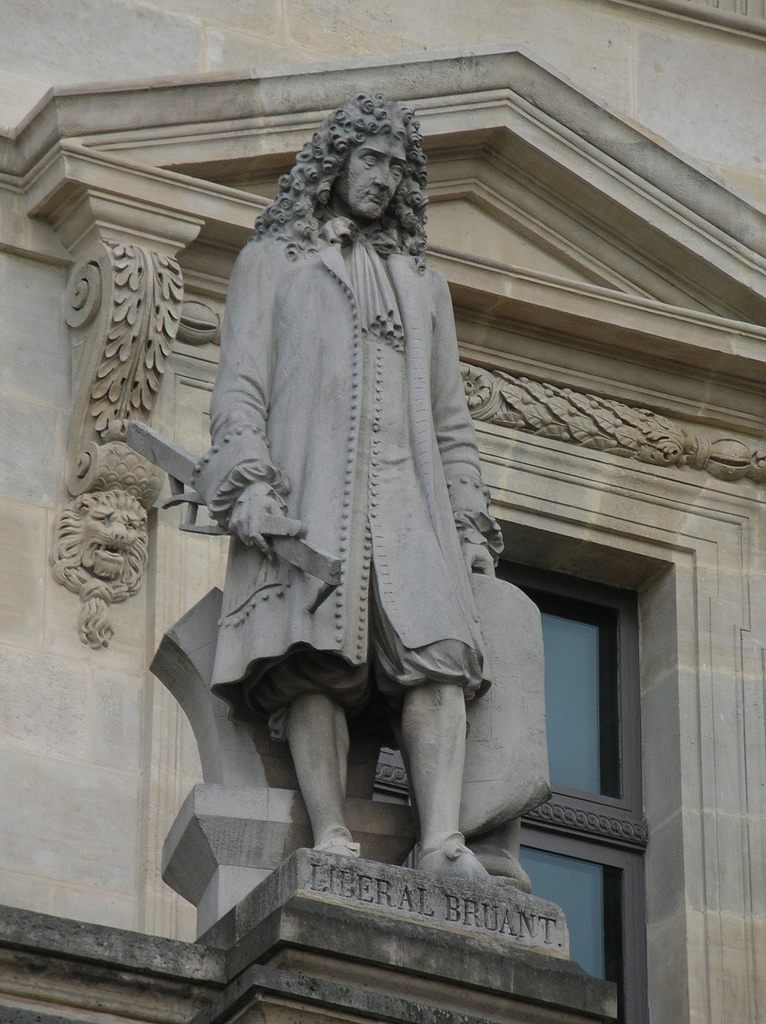
Statue of Libéral Bruant at the Louvre

Libéral Bruant (French pronunciation: [libeʁal bʁyɑ̃]; c. 1635 – 22 November 1697) was a French architect best known as the designer of the Hôtel des Invalides in Paris. Bruant was the most notable member in a family that produced a long series of architects active from the 16th to the 18th century.

== Biography ==
In 1660, Bruant was the architect chosen for rehabilitations to Louis XIII's old arsenal (the Salpêtrière), which was being converted into what would become the world's largest hospice. It is now the Pitié-Salpêtrière Hospital.

He designed the Hôtel des Invalides in Paris, which is now dominated by the dome erected by Jules Hardouin Mansart, his collaborator in earlier stages of the construction.

In the Marais district of Paris, the hôtel particulier Bruant built for himself in 1685, at 1 rue de la Perle now houses the Bricard Lock Museum (Musée de la Serrure). Its Baroque façade of golden limestone is enlivened by windows set into blind arches that march across its front and busts in oval reserves, all under a richly-sculptured pediment that is pierced by an oval window.

In 1671, he became one of the first eight members of the Académie royale d'architecture, created by Louis XIV.

Bruant died on 22 November 1697, in Paris.

== Architectural style ==
A comparison of Bruant's central entrance to the Invalides, under an arched cornice packed with military trophies with Mansart's Église du Dome, gives a clear idea of the difference between Bruant's High Baroque and Hardouin-Mansart's restrained and somewhat academic Late Baroque.

== See also ==
- Architecture of Paris
- Les Invalides
