= Jean-Nicolas Corvisart =

French medical doctor (1755–1821)

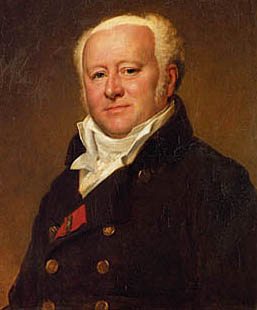
- Portrait by François Gérard
- Born: 15 February 1755; Dricourt, France
- Died: 18 September 1821 (aged 66); Courbevoie, France

Jean-Nicolas Corvisart-Desmarets (15 February 1755 – 18 September 1821) was a French medical doctor.

Born in the village of Dricourt (now in Ardennes), Corvisart studied from 1777 at the Ecole de Médecine in Paris, later qualifying as docteur régent of the Faculté de Paris (1782). In 1797, Corvisart began to teach at the Collège de France, where he gained a reputation as an expert in cardiology. Among his students were René Laennec, Guillaume Dupuytren, Xavier Bichat and Pierre Bretonneau.

Corvisart resurrected percussion during the French Revolution after it had fallen out of fashion. He emphasized the study of symptoms and examined postmortem evidence as well. In 1808 Corvisart's translation of Leopold von Auenbrugg's Inventum Novum from Latin into French was published. Corvisart was especially fond of Auenbrugg's use of chest percussion as a diagnostic tool, and began to perfect the technique. In the meantime, Corvisart had become since 1804 the primary physician of Napoléon Bonaparte, who he would continue to attend to until Bonaparte's exile to St. Helena Island, October 1815. In 1820 he was made a member of Académie Nationale de Médecine. He died the following year at Courbevoie.

== Early life and education ==
Jean-Nicolas Corvisart was born on February 15, 1755, in the French village of Dricourt, Ardennes. His father, Pierre Corvisart, was an attorney for the Parlement of Paris. He moved to Dricourt when the Parliament dissolved, but returned to Paris after the birth of his son, who he destined to be a fellow lawyer. At the age of 12, at his fathers wish, Jean-Nicolas Corvisart entered the prestigious college of Sainte-Barbe. A mediocre student, Corvisart spent most of his time playing outdoor sports, giving no indication of the bright future his father dreamt. However, one day, after listening to anatomy professor, Antoine Petit, and visiting medical clinics in Paris, Corvisart became fascinated in medicine. He convinced his father and quit pursuing law to pursue a medical profession. Corvisart immediately obtained a position at the Hotel-Dieu as a male nurse. He later attended medical school at the Faculte de Medicine, where he was an outstanding student, known for his work ethic, observation skills, and independent spirit.

To his peers, Corvisart was known to be stocky in stature, vigorous in manner, outspoken, honest, generous to the poor, and not afraid to defy tradition. Corvisart had the option of choosing between medicine and surgery, and decided he preferred and was more attracted towards medicine. While in medical school, Corvisart studied and closely followed the likes of Debois de Rochefort, Busquet Halle, Pelletan Roger, Vicq d'Azyr and was a favorite pupil of Antoine Petit and Pierre-Joseph Desault. Even as the youngest member of his class, Corvisart was at the top of his class. He presented his inaugural thesis on September 2, 1782, and graduated from medical school that same year.

== Early practice and lecturing ==
Unfortunately, his defiance to tradition ultimately led to his failure in finding work after graduation. He had applied to the Hospital of Paroisses, which was founded by Madam Necker, but was denied of working there as a physician by Necker because he refused to wear the powdered wig required for the position. Thus, Corvisart started his practice as a doctor in the poor neighborhoods of Saint Sulpice in Paris. Corvisart soon became distinguished for not only his skills as a clinician, but also for his personality. He slowly became more and more well known, climbing up the ranks, and eventually, in 1783, was appointed to teach physiology, surgery, and obstetrics to medical school. Eventually, in 1786, he became the professor of clinical pathology. Corvisart also worked closely with Debois de Rochfort at the Charite Hospital in Paris.

Upon Rochfort's death, Corvisart succeeded Rochfort and worked as a physician at the hospital. Once again, Corvisart excelled and his reputation spread across the hospital and the city. By 1795, Corvisart was elected to be the Chair of Clinical Medicine of what was a newly formed medical school at the Charite Hospital in Paris and took over the clinical teaching. Corvisart innovated new methods in treating patients, focusing not on researching diseases in cadavers, but on recognizing particular diseases based on signs and symptoms given off by the patient. Consequently, this new method was taught to the entire hospital, thus adopting a new method of treating patients that is still used today. Patients were divided into different categories of diseases, and an assistant would have daily observations of the patient, and present the observation and heath status of the patient to the respective physician.

== Physician of Napoleon ==
In 1799, Corvisart and fellow French physician Paul Joseph Barthez were appointed by the French government as 'physicians of the Government'. In 1801, one of Corvisart's first patients, Barras, invited Corvisart to a reception, where he was introduced to General Napoleon Bonaparte and his wife Josephine. (Note: There, they had the following conversation. Josephine: "To what disease do you think the General is most likely to be exposed?" Corvisart: "To a disease of the heart." Napoleon: "Have you written a book on that?" Corvisart: "No, but I intend to publish one soon." Napoleon: "Then lose no time, we will speak on this later.") Napoleon was said to be a 'difficult' person to treat in the clinical setting, as he demanded a full explanation for each aspect of the ailments he experienced. Napoleon often refused to take prescribed medicine and was skeptical as to the practice and application of medical treatment, save that suggested by Corvisart, who he deemed as both competent and reliable.

In August 1803, Napoleon sent for Corvisart due to chest pain and a sudden cough. Napoleon had been characterized as reluctant to access his physicians, including Corvisart at first. Corvisart quickly diagnosed Napoleon with a pulmonary congestion, which he did not disclose to the emperor out of regard for his well-being. Instead, he treated the condition with a vesicant, which proved to be effective in countering the pain and congestion. In retrospect of the successful and tactful treatment, Napoleon was quoted as saying, "I saw that Corvisart understood my system, and that he was the doctor who suited me, so I attached him to myself". Corvisart's treatment of Napoleon included a strict regimen of hygiene. Corvisart instructed Napoleon to take a hot bath daily, which Napoleon adhered to.

By 1806, Corvisart published his manuscript entitled Essai sur les maladies et les lésions organiques du cæur et des gros vaisseaux, which many consider to be the first writings of modern cardiology. By this time, Corvisart had become one of the most reputable and cleverest physician of his day, working as head of the greatest hospital in Paris. His reputation impressed Napoleon so much, he hired Corvisart to be his personal physician. (Note: A sign of Napoleon's trust in Corvisart is reflected in his quote "I don't believe in medicine but I believe in Corvisart".) Thus, when Barthez died in 1806, Corvisart was given the title of 'chief physician' and attended to Napoleon and his family, consisting of the Empress as well as the Imperial House and court. Napoleon was also said to have suffered from breathing difficulties and respiratory issues, which Corvisart treated to the best of his abilities. Napoleon was also said to have contracted a violent case of the scabies, which Corvisart was able to effectively treat with a concoction of ointments and salves containing olive oil, alcohol, and 'powdered cevilla'. Upon Corvisart's death, a marked difference was noted in efficacy of care and treatment style among the doctors who assumed Corvisart's post. Corvisart also treated Empress Joséphine de Beauharnais, attempting to cure her sterility. When this treatment failed and Napoleon divorced Empress Josephine, Corvisart alienated Marie Louise, Duchess of Parma with his brash and frank mannerisms, leading to his disaffection from Napoleon.

As such, Corvisart and Napoleon's relationship is said to have spanned from 1804 to 1815. (Note: A journal entry by Barry Edward O'Meara suggests that Corvisart and Napoleon had a close repartee, and that Corvisart was often able to stifle Napoleon's concerns with and objections towards medicine and the medical practice. Napoleon also often adopted a casual tone and joked with Corvisart, asking him questions such as, "how many patients are you going to kill to-day?", to which Corvisart responded "Not many, Sire".) Corvisart acted as more than just an appointed physician to Napoleon. Corvisart also acted as a liaison between Napoleon and Edward Jenner in releasing two British prisoners of war in June 1806. The prisoners, Mr. William Thomas Williams and Dr. Wickham, were friends of Jenner, and Jenner held esteem for them as educated men. In this capacity Corvisart was given a copy of the letter Jenner had written to Napoleon, entreating his release of the British prisoners in July 1806. Corvisart addressed Mr. Williams and relayed Napoleon's decision—that he and Dr. Wickham were to be allowed to return to their native England, as Napoleon could not refuse a request from Dr. Jenner. Corvisart was remarked to be "exceedingly punctual in making all Jenner's requests known to His Majesty". Jenner also entreated the release of prisoners named Mr. Gold and Mr. Garland, and again went through Corvisart to ask the favor of Napoleon. However, due to a 'subordinate' official, the release command from Napoleon and passed through Corvisart that would have freed Mr. Gold was lost, leading to an additional three years of imprisonment from 1809 to 1812, at which point the release order was recovered. In return for the liberation of Jenner's companions, Corvisart asked for Jenner's assistance in freeing a French officer, Captain Husson, who was captured after a tactical defeat. Jenner was unable to influence the English government into releasing Husson, to Corvisart's dismay.

Additionally, Corvisart was said to have feuded with Antoine Portal over treatment of Napoleon. As Portal became more influential in the French medical scene, he attracted the attention of Corvisart, who would not permit him to engage with the Imperial family, out of a deep dislike. In December 1808, Napoleon granted Corvisart the title of 'Baron' in recognition of his services and dillegence as Napoleon's physician. Napoleon also awarded Corvisart with the title of 'Officer of the Legion of Honour', leading to Corvisart's admittance into the Academy of Sciences in 1811.

== Final years and death ==
At age 60, Corvisart retired. He was made a member of Académie Nationale de Médecine in 1820. He died on September 15, 1821, after a third attack of apoplexy, which caused a hemiplegia, 4 months after Napoleon died.

== Legacy ==
Corvisart contributed heavily to the field of pathological anatomy, by advocating for the understanding that the uniqueness of each body and its organs affect the nature of disease. Within this time period, medical practitioners commonly believed the natural state of the human body was consistent health, unless faced with an unknown catalyst. It was thought that the body naturally should be in a healthy state and that an unhealthy body was a result of either an imbalance or a pathogenic cause. Corvisart's belief in individual variation challenged this assumption. He postulated that the reason for disease was due to the body's individuality, rather than its generalized consistency. The irregularity or variability of the body was at fault for pathogenic infection. Instead, the natural body was too weak to heal against threatening disease. The individual's susceptibility to pathogen was "an outcome of heredity and prenatal development", and uncontrollable by regimented living. While his attention to patient-specific diagnosis was already a part of Paris medicine, Corvisart's approach accepted varied clusters of symptoms for any disease, rather than a set checklist determining how the disease must manifest.

Furthermore, Corvisart championed the view that disease was "organic", which means that disease causes a constitutional change to organs. A disease could be asymptomatic, but the presence of structural change indicated illness regardless of whether the patient manifested symptoms or not. This medical understanding was supplemented by "lesions" found in the organs of asymptomatic corpses during anatomical dissection. Either acute or chronic illnesses were caused by the body's constitutional make-up and its weakened ability to fight against the specific disease. In essence, disease was caused by an organ's weakness.

Corvisart attention to pathological anatomy and belief in organic disease shifted the focus of medicine away from observation of the patient and the patient's symptoms. Autopsy became a strong force in Paris medical know-how. Physical examination began to take precedence, although internal examinations were impossible. Although the aforementioned lesions were common in most corpses, Corvisart and his contemporaries shifted medicine towards the clinical and physical ways that disease affects the body and away from the patient narrative. This change also represented a segue from therapeutic medicine to diagnostic medicine, which banked on the premise that a cure would always be present for whatever diagnosis was available.

As one of his publications, Corvisart's translation of Leopold Auenbrugger's Inventum novum in 1808 further expanded the field of auscultation through providing a text for physicians to learn how to percuss patients' chests for diagnostic purposes. His commentary on Auenbrugger's original text extended its length four times. This method of percussion had a resurgence under Corvisart's translation and became an intrinsic aspect of clinical medicine. In particular, Corvisart attentively focused on the heart and lungs as sources of lesions. His studies with these lesions led to him percussing the chest of his patients to find such wounds inside the body, studying the "organic diseases of the heart". Corvisart is also linked to Reneé Laennec, the physician who invented the stethoscope for auscultation several years later. Laennec learned of percussion from Corvisart's translation of Auenbrugger's book. Corvisart, Laennec and others also headed the so-called "Paris school" that developed new methods of medicine in the twenty hospitals of Paris. By establishing a monetary clinical teaching school at Hôpital de la Charité, Corvisart and his peers codified a current institution of medical training.

Corvisart's original work consists of Essai sur les maladies du cœur (1806), and has many other commentaries on other medical tracts. In addition to his medical contributions, Corvisart was featured on a French Red Cross Fund stamp on December 12, 1964. The stamp depicts a picture of the heart and blood flow, which Corvisart is acknowledged for examining. It also has the name of his book, Essai sur les maladies du cœur published in 1806. This dedicatory stamp exhibits Corvisart's lasting contributions in Paris medicine and medicine internationally. He has been called "the true promoter of clinical medicine in France" for diverting the focus of observational diagnosis to the physical examination.

== Selected writings ==
- Cours élémentaire de matière médicale: suivi d'un précis de l'art de formuler, Volume 1 (with Louis Desbois de Rochefort) 1793 - Basic course of materia medica.
- Essai sur les maladies et les lésions organiques du cœur et des gros vaisseaux, 1806 (with C. E. Horeau), translated into English by Jacob Gates as " An essay on the organic diseases and lesions of the heart and great vessels" (1812).
- Nouvelle methode pour reconnaitre les maladies internes de la poitrine par la percussion de cette cavité, 1808 - New method to recognize diseases of the internal chest by percussion of the cavity, (French translation of Leopold Auenbrugger's Latin book on medical percussion).

== See also ==
- History of medicine in France
