= History of medicine in France =

The history of medicine in France focuses on how the medical profession and medical institutions in France have changed over time. Early medicine in France was defined by, and administered by, the Catholic church. Medicine and care were one of the many charitable ventures of the church. During the era of the French Revolution, new ideas took hold within the world of medicine and medicine was made more scientific and the hospitals were made more medical. Paris Medicine is a term defining the series of changes to the hospital and care received with a hospital that occurred during the period of the French Revolution. Ideas from the Enlightenment and Scientific Revolution were introduced into the medical field.

== Hospitals before the Revolution ==
The origin of hospitals, and the care provided within them, is closely linked with the rise of early Christianity. By the third century, the Christian church was responsible for almost all charity, including charity in the field of medicine. For example, the bishop of Byzantium established institutions called Xenodochium to provide spiritual guidance for the poor. These early hospital-like institutions were deeply religions spaces, closely linked to the church, and their main focus was general care for the poor - food and shelter - along with spiritual treatment.

Hospitals continued to preserve and celebrate their close link to the church throughout the Medieval and Renaissance eras. They promoted the link between spiritual healing and actual medicine, best exemplified by the ever-present Christus medicus in these medical institutions, an artistic representation of Jesus as a physician. All hospitals had various aspects of a church - they all included chapels, cloisters, and an altar for Mass. Monasteries and hospitals were often one and the same, containing both an infirmary for monks, a house for paupers, a sanitarium for lepers, and a hospital. One could go to a "hospital" if they had leprosy and were turned away elsewhere, or to get basic treatment or spiritual guidance from a priest.

During the Reformation, few of these hospitals in newly Protestant countries survived the change that the Reformation brought. Most were forced to close as they lost their funding, which had primarily been from the church. Smaller hospitals, funded by local philanthropists, still managed to find success, especially in Scandinavian countries. With the Catholic Reformation, many Catholic leaders were also driven to found hospitals in competition with their Protestant counterparts. The care provided in these hospitals still focused on spirituality as before.

In 1633, Saint Vincent de Paul and Saint Louise de Marillac founded the Daughters of Charity, and the organization quickly took charge of hospitals across France, staffing many positions in the general hospitals. The care provided in these hospitals was dictated by the Daughter's agenda, which was mostly providing spiritual care for the dying as well as alms for the poor. Doctors and sisters often disagreed on what was best for the patient. Hospitals very much remained this way up until the French Revolution.

In France, the first general hospitals were established during the 17th century. Paris established its general hospital in 1656, and it contained three divisions for men, women, and children - the Bicêtre, the Saltpêtrière, and Pitié respectively. The Saltpêtrière became famous, especially for its patient population of mostly prostitutes, and also for becoming the largest hospital in the world by 1789. The original purpose of these general hospitals was for them to function as form of social control over the poor, and encouraged by their success, Louis XIV mandated that all cities of a certain population in France have a general hospital. Historians debate as to these institutions effectiveness in actually controlling the population. Though hospitals were used to house specific groups of people (orphans, the poor, prostitutes, immigrants), they were also legitimately involved in their care, and were not just another form of penitentiary. At this point in time hospital medicine was still fundamentally spiritual institutions, focused on nursing, general and spiritual care. Oftentimes a certificate of baptism and a confession were entry requirements for French hospitals.

Given the charitable nature of hospitals, many came for food and shelter, and the hospitals were often plagued with overpopulation. The Hotel Dieu infamously housed nearly three times as many people as it had beds. Overcrowding created very poor health conditions, which in turn gave these hospitals high mortality rates - nearly 25% at the Hotel Dieu. The best medical care was reserved for only those who could afford it, and the poor population of France's general hospitals very often could not. The hospitals were often a place where one could guarantee getting their last rites from a priest, rather than getting cured by a doctor. Doctors often weren't even on staff at such hospitals, and the sisters from the Daughters of Charity did their best to make people comfortable - providing clothing, beds, and food, and of course the spiritual treatment that had been present since the inception of hospitals. This remained the status quo for French hospitals until the French Revolution.

== Hospital medicine of the French Revolution ==
Many concepts of modern hospital medicine are considered products of social and political change of the French Revolution, arising in the late eighteenth and early nineteenth centuries. Medical reform was a contentious topic of the revolutionary movement, as the French medical system met neither the needs of the population nor its practitioners. Patients described Paris' hospitals as poorhouses, noting severe overcrowding, and that only those with the means to pay could secure a personal bed. Medical professionals also sought hospital reform, as a struggle for control with the religious nurses who had traditionally staffed Parisian hospitals under management of the Catholic church.

In addition to the political factors of the revolution, several practical circumstances created a unique environment for change in Paris' system of hospitals. First, Paris was the largest continental European city of the eighteenth century; there averaged six thousand poor and actually ill patients in the city's 20 hospitals at any time. Due to the lack of hospital regulation under the revolutionary government, the bodies of these patients were used for medical experimentation on an unprecedented scale. The research experiments performed by Parisian doctors on patients and cadavers led to new medical discoveries and approaches. In addition, these experiments mark the beginning of medical research being integrated with hospital medicine.

Another circumstantial factor behind Paris' hospital transformation was the architecture of its hospital buildings. While the hospitals in Paris were relatively modern, in many instances the buildings required renovation and repair. Now under the guidance of medical professionals, new priorities in hospital design took precedence. A notable example was the Hôpital de la Charité, remodeled under the leadership of physician Jean-Nicolas Corvisart and several architects; changes involved removing the hospital's chapel, adding an amphitheater for clinical demonstrations, as well as dedicated rooms for surgical operation, hydrotherapy and electrotherapy. At the time, these were new features to hospital design.

=== Changes in medical education ===
As research became integral to the hospital system, medical education also claimed a larger role in the hospital. By 1785, the Hôtel-Dieu de Paris had established a formal training procedure, including both demonstrations and hands-on experience, and was moving away from separate fields of medicine and surgery. The lack of qualified surgeons coupled with the unprecedented scale of casualties in the revolution motivated medical education reform. Medical students routinely assisted their teachers in the hospital to address understaffing, a marked departure from the historically hands-off style of medical teaching. Guidelines set forth by the revolutionary government, defined by Joseph-Ignace Guillotin and Félix Vicq-d'Azyr, formally asserted the importance of hospitals in medical education; by 1794, hospitals were regarded as the principle institution of medical training.

=== Role of the patient in hospital medicine ===
Patient-doctor relations took a new form in and after the French Revolution, as a product of the changing hospital environment. The revolutionary movement acknowledged a cause-and-effect relationship between poverty and disease. A key claim in the revolutionary platform was all citizens' right to health.

A range of new ideas arose from the need to provide large-scale systematized treatments: foster parenting, wet nursing, and the soup kitchen were all innovations originating from Parisian hospitals. The hospitals were divided into specialized wards for various diseases and patient demographics, notably neonatology, pediatrics and geriatrics. Within these wards, patients became the subjects of medical study and observation; their presence in the hospital supported the process of medical research and training. However, these changes came at the cost of patient autonomy, and increased bureaucracy within the hospitals. Personalized treatment was compromised in favor of research-oriented practice.

=== Diagnosis and the categorization of disease ===
Means of diagnosis became increasingly evidence-based and impersonal. The factors considered in diagnosis shifted away from patient narrative in favor of physicians' observations. Doctors of the period, including François Victor Mérat de Vaumartoise (who studied under Jean-Nicolas Corvisart), noted the likelihood of patients exaggerating in their description of symptoms and pain, as well as an inability of the uneducated poor to accurately describe their experiences. Patient-doctor communication to aid in diagnosis was therefore limited to straightforward, non-technical questions. More important, however, were systematic and empirical observations of the patient. Beyond basic inspection, physicians used palpitation, percussion and auscultation to identify abnormalities. Pathological anatomy, examination, and empirical knowledge supplanted the role of the patient's account in the process of diagnosis. In the Necker-Enfants Malades Hospital, René Laennec invented the first stethoscope design to aid in diagnosis via auscultation. Laennec also devised a methodical procedure for diagnosis using the stethoscope, meticulously categorizing the patient data he collected. Precise diagnosis was also seen as evidence of scientific legitimacy, and within the medical community, a metric of a medical professional's knowledge.

== After the Revolution and impact ==
Due to the restructuring of the Parisian government during the French Revolution, and the subsequent upheaval of the Parisian medical system, 20 hospitals were modernized to keep up with medical and technological advances at the start of the 19th century. These hospitals were crucial in discovering and elaborating upon medical knowledge through experimentation and research, and disseminating that knowledge through the teaching of what became known as the Paris School of medicine. This Paris School came to be in part due to a high concentration of talented and innovative clinicians, led by figures such as Jean-Nicholas Corvisart, Philippe Pinel, and Xavier Bichat.

The Paris School of Medicine was the result of a multitude of factors spanning the decades before, during, and after the French Revolution. It was during this time period where traditional limits disappeared and innovation occurred, with numerous talented doctors in addition to the modernized facilities and abundance of patients. Perhaps one of the biggest factors that turned Paris into the clinical capital of the world was the high quantity of cadavers produced - a significant contributor being the Hotel Dieu - and used for dissection and medical education.

Another notable trend was the separation of religion and medicine. Hospitals prior to the Revolution were religious institutions where the ill would seek comfort - for example, the Sisters of Charity operated the Hôpital de la Charité. When the new regime seized the medical institutions and took control over hospital operations, medical education was also restructured to emphasize learning through clinical experience and observation rather than strictly book learning. However, the total separation of religion and medicine was not to last forever - as early as 1801 Jean-Antoine Chaptal called the Sisters of Charity to reopen their hospitals, as the Parisian infrastructure could not handle the massive influx of patients. The Sisters refused; however, nurses came back into practice, playing a similar role as the pre-Revolution nurses. These nurses were now physician's assistants rather than the sole healer, and the physician, who was predominantly male, held all power over diagnosis and treatment. This marked a permanent gender reversal of roles as the female nurses were essentially demoted in comparison to the new physicians.

Hospital policies continued to change after the turn of the century. In 1801, Paris instated a new policy of hospital admission: a central office was created at Hotel Dieu that triaged all patients in Paris, and redirected them to the appropriate hospital for treatment. This triaging would account for the demand for medical education, and would often send patients to fill up learning hospitals such as the Charite. This centralization worked poorly, however. Prospective patients would often apply at nearby hospitals rather than make the journey to Hotel Dieu, and often physicians would select their own patients to fulfill needs of research or instruction rather than have the patients be assigned to them through triage. A similar centralization happened with pharmaceuticals: In 1795 a central pharmacy was created with rebuilt and adapted laboratories. This led to research in substitutes for substances such as cane sugar, opium, tea and coffee as well as the isolation of substances like caffeine and codeine. However, Napoleon seized the central pharmaceutical building in 1810, and it moved to a new facility in 1813.

The improper disposal of body parts from dissections became a public scandal as noted by Sebastien Mercier in Tableau de Paris in 1783. This was only addressed in 1813 when prefect of police Etienne Denis Pasquier ordered an inspection of all private dissection schools. The report produced by this inspection horrified officials and a new policy was instated. All dissections for educational purposes would now be held in one of two locations: either the Faculty of Medicine or a new facility constructed near Pitie hospital. Ample numbers of cadavers would be supplied by the government. Hospitals complained about the distance to these facilities, and by 1831, ten of these hospitals had their own facilities approved. These complaints were also coupled with complaints about foreigners (mainly English) coming to France solely for education, some not even knowing passable French. These complaints mark the extent of the worldwide renown of the Paris School of medicine, and its subsequent globalization.

Numerous medical advancements continued throughout the 19th century. Rene Laennec invented the stethoscope in 1813, which he then used in combination to the discovery of tubercles in the lungs to fashion a new diagnostic process for identifying tuberculosis. Students flocked to patients' bedsides for observations with this newfound invention.

Louis Braille was admitted at the age of 10 to the National Institute for Blind Children, which assembled in Paris. He succeeded in getting acceptance for his system of blind communication, known today simply as Braille.

=== French colonies ===
According to a 2021 study, French health campaigns in its colonies, which often included forcible examinations and injections of medicine with severe side effects, led to persistent distrust in medicine in the affected colonies.
