= Philibert Joseph Roux =

French surgeon

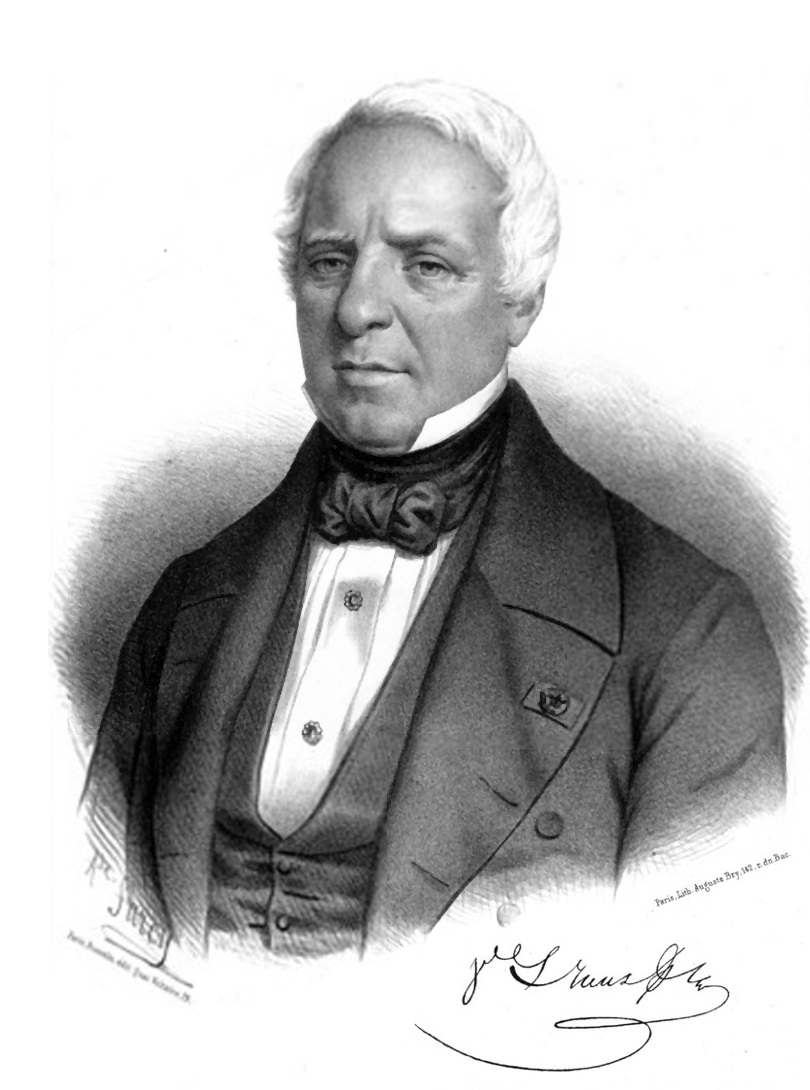
Philibert Joseph Roux (1780–1854)

Philibert Joseph Roux (April 26, 1780 – March 24, 1854) was a French surgeon born in Auxerre.

Trained as a military surgeon, he later moved to Paris, where he was a student and friend of Xavier Bichat (1771–1802). In 1806, he became a surgeon at the Hôpital Beaujon, and in 1810 was assigned to the Hôpital de la Charité. In 1835, he succeeded Guillaume Dupuytren (1777–1835) as chief surgeon at Hôtel-Dieu de Paris.

Remembered for his pioneer work in plastic surgery, in 1819 he performed one of the earliest staphylorrhaphies (surgical repair of a cleft palate). He is also credited with being the first surgeon to suture a ruptured female perineum (1832).

A collection of his papers is held at the National Library of Medicine in Bethesda, Maryland.

== Selected writings ==
- Nouveaux élémens de médecine opératoire, 1813 - New elements of operative medicine.
- Memoire sur la staphyloraphie, ou suture du voile du palais, 1825 - Memoir on the staphylorraphy, or suture of the soft palate.
- "A Narrative of a Journey to London in 1814, or, A parallel of the English and French surgery".
