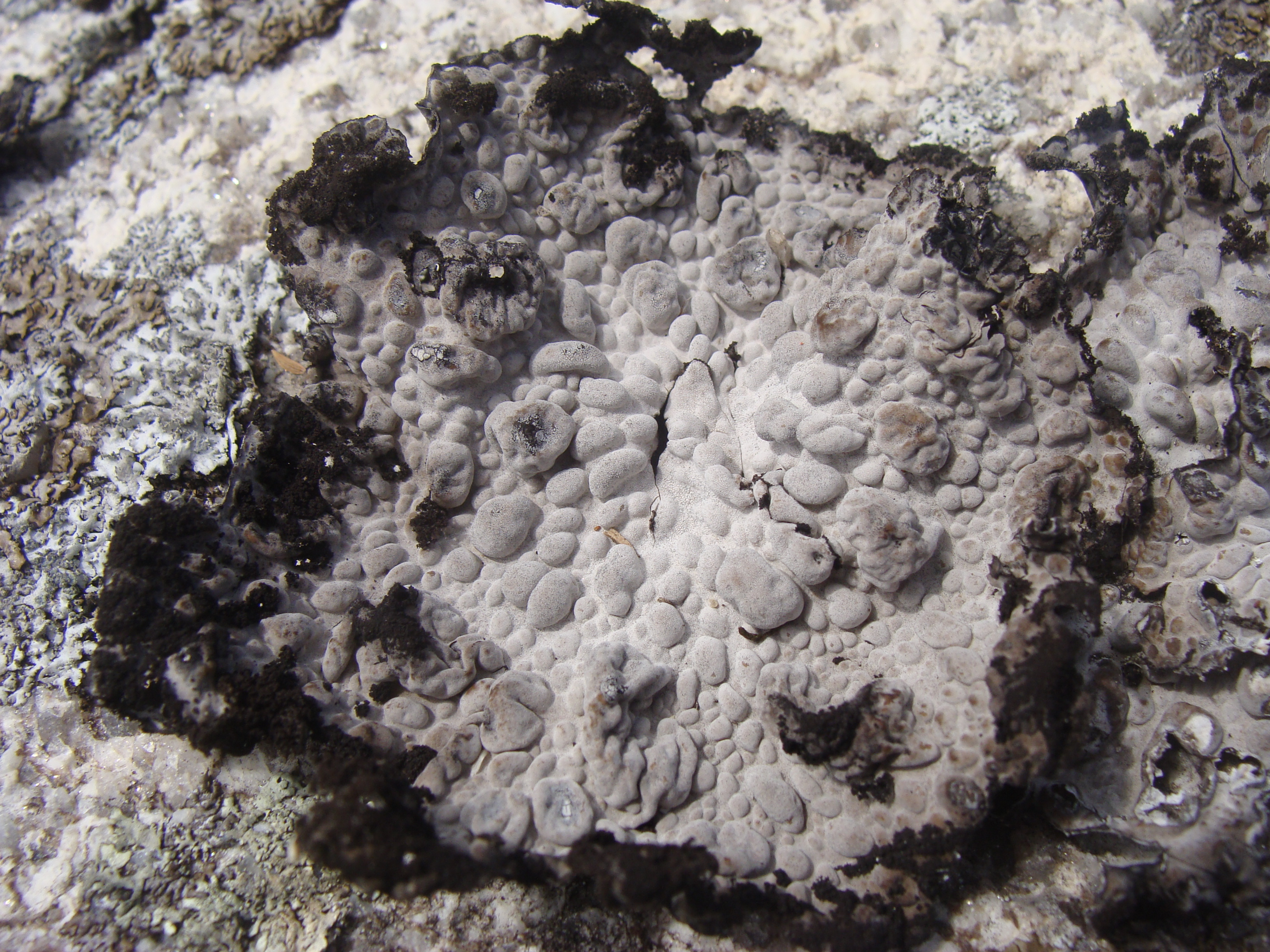
- L. pustulata, type species of genus Lasallia

Scientific classification
- Kingdom: Fungi
- Division: Ascomycota
- Class: Lecanoromycetes
- Order: Umbilicariales
- Family: Umbilicariaceae
- Genus: Lasallia; Mérat (1821)

Type species
- Lasallia pustulata (L.) Mérat (1821)

Species
- L. caroliniana L. freyana L. laceratula L. papulosa L. pensylvanica L. pustulata L. rubiginosa

= Lasallia =

Genus of lichen-forming fungi

Lasallia is a genus of lichen-forming fungi in the family Umbilicariaceae. These lichens are recognizable by their distinctive warty, blister-covered thallus surface and their unusual attachment to rocks using only a single, sturdy central connection point. They typically grow on granite and other hard rock surfaces, where they can survive in both sunny and shaded locations. The genus contains six accepted species that are found across various continents, with some species being quite common on stone walls and cliff faces.

== Taxonomy ==
The genus was circumscribed by François Victor Mérat de Vaumartoise in 1821. The genus name Lasallia honours Paul-François Lasalle (1771-1809), who was a French gardener and botanist, who worked in Fontainebleau. Early molecular phylogenetics analysis of internal transcribed spacer DNA showed that the genus was monophyletic.

More recent work has refined the generic concept. In 2010 Davydov, Peršoh and Rambold transferred Umbilicaria caroliniana to Lasallia after combined morphological study and ITS-nrDNA analysis, creating the new combination L. caroliniana. Because this species has eight-spored asci, the authors emended the diagnosis so that ascospore number is no longer decisive; instead, Lasallia is now characterised by a pustulate thallus coupled with large, multicellular-muriform brown ascospores, a suite of traits that separates it from Umbilicaria irrespective of spore count.

Their phylogeny recovered a strongly supported "Lasallia-clade" that includes L. caroliniana and is nested within a paraphyletic assemblage of Umbilicaria species. This result confirms Lasallia as monophyletic while implying that Umbilicaria, as presently circumscribed, is paraphyletic; nonetheless, the authors recommended retaining the two-genus framework of the family Umbilicariaceae.

== Description ==
The thallus of Lasallia lichens forms a single, circular to irregular lobe that lies flat against the substrate yet is tethered at its centre by a stout, navel-like stalk called an umbilicus. Because the thallus is dorsiventral, its upper and lower surfaces differ in structure and appearance. The upper face is densely covered in rounded, blister-like swellings (pustules) that give the lichen a warty texture, while the underside shows matching bowl-shaped pits created by the same swellings. Unlike many foliose lichens, the lower surface lacks rooting fibres (rhizines); attachment is achieved solely by the umbilicus. Minute, corticated outgrowths known as isidia often develop on the thallus surface; these readily break off and serve as tiny clones, allowing the lichen to spread vegetatively.

Microscopically the outer skin (cortex) on the upper side consists of roughly spherical cells capped by a thin, dead epinecral layer that helps shield the photobiont—green, single-celled algae of the chlorococcoid type—from excess light and water loss. The lower cortex is built from thick-walled, tightly glued cells that reinforce the thallus and define the deep pits beneath the pustules. Within the medulla (the lichen's internal tissue layer) the fungal filaments (hyphae) envelop the algal cells, enabling the two partners to exchange nutrients.

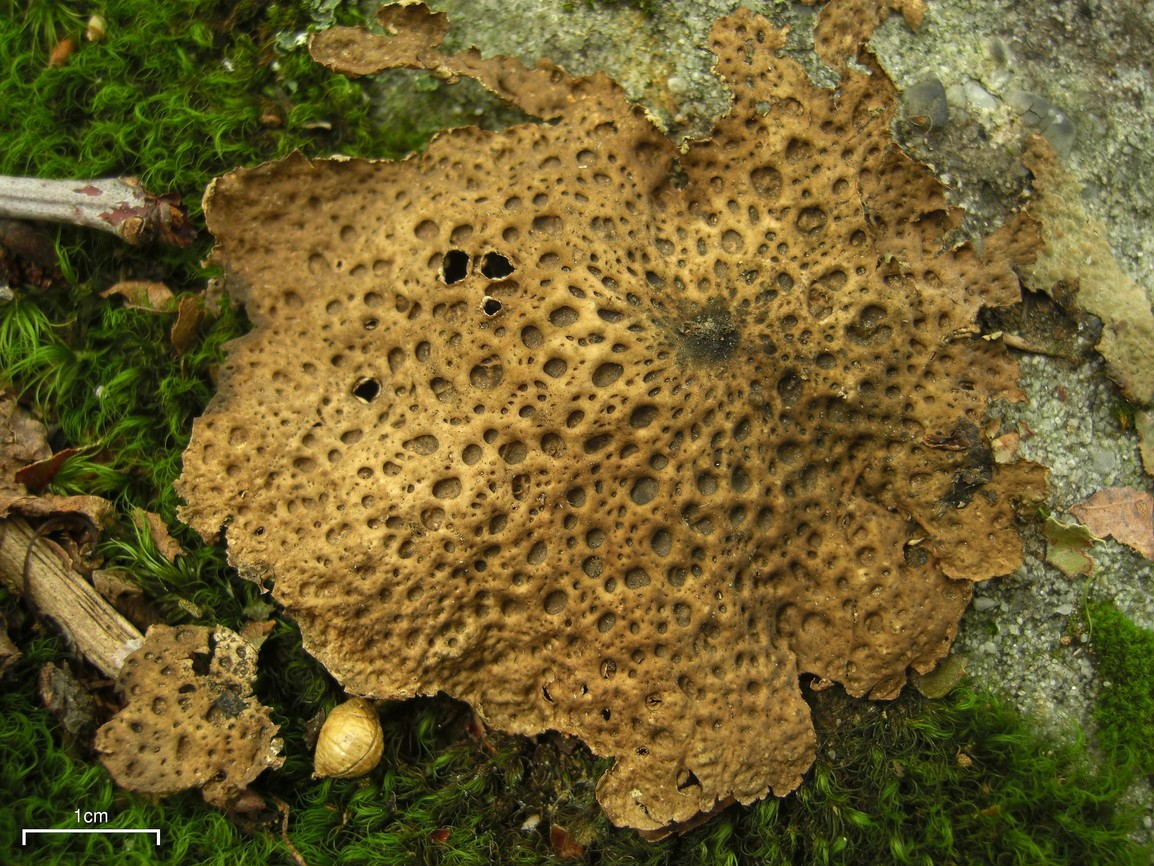
Lasallia papulosa

Sexual reproduction takes place in disc-shaped fruiting bodies (apothecia) that sit directly on the thallus or rise on short stalks near its margins. These discs are black and flat, rimmed by a persistent fungal exciple rather than thallus tissue. Each ascus typically produces a single large ascospore (occasionally two); the spores are muriform—divided by many internal walls—and gradually darken from pale to deep brown as they mature. Additional asexual spores are formed in tiny, flask-shaped cavities (pycnidia) embedded in the thallus; these release rod-shaped conidia that can start new colonies if they encounter a suitable algal partner. The genus is chemically characterised by the presence of gyrophoric acid, papulosin, and yellow-orange anthraquinone pigments.

High-performance liquid chromatography analysis of several Lasallia species revealed a number of secondary metabolites in this genus, including gyrophoric acid, lecanoric acid, umbilicaric acid, 7-chloroemodin, valsarin, skyrin, hiascic acid, and ovoic acid.

== Ecology ==
Species of Lasallia characteristically establish themselves on silica-rich rock—granite boulders, cliff faces, and even mortared stone walls—where the tough umbilicus anchors the thallus securely to the substrate. They tolerate a wide spectrum of light conditions, growing in open, sun-baked exposures as readily as in shaded crevices and overhangs.

== Species ==
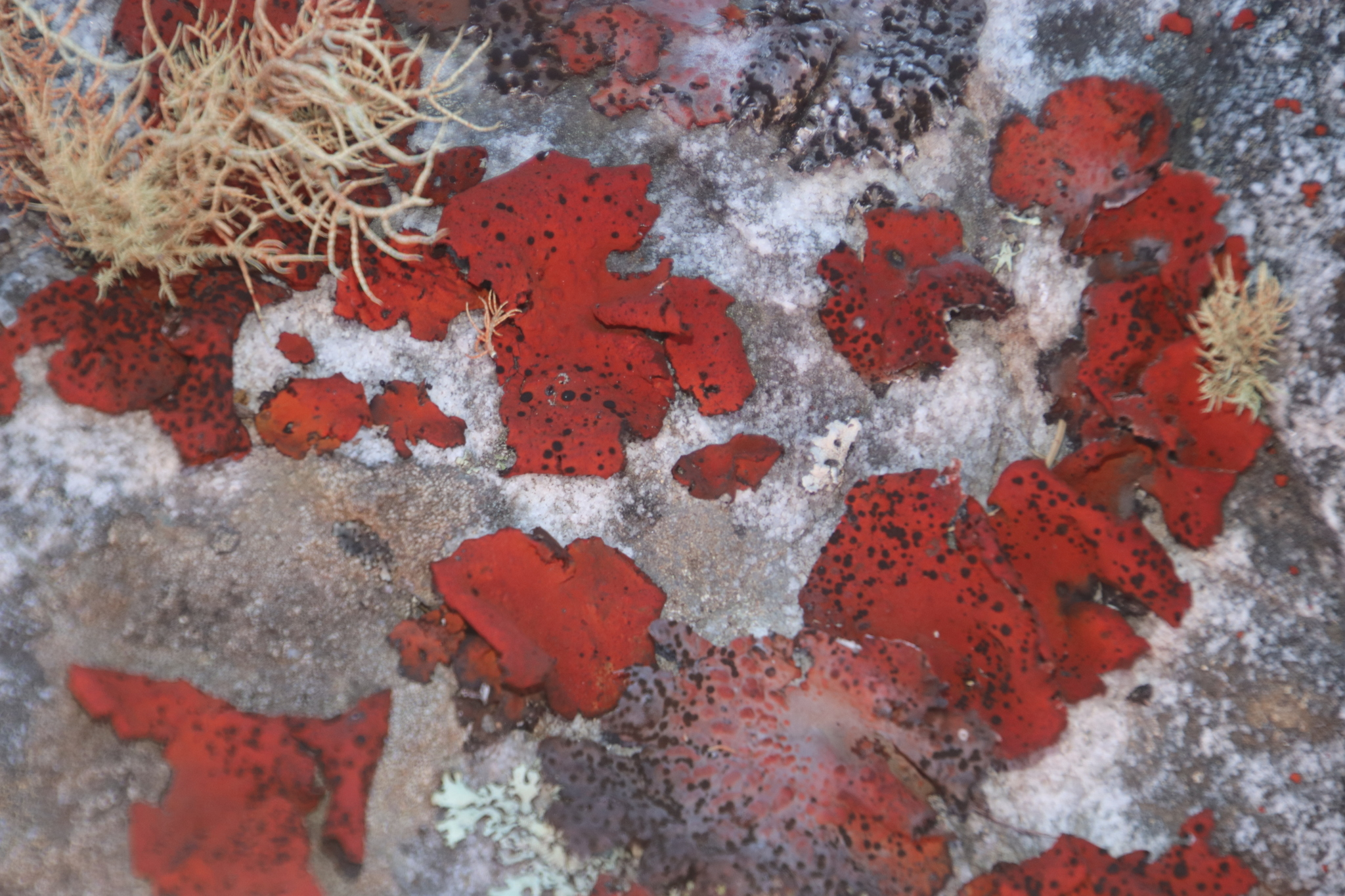
Lasallia rubiginosa

As of June 2025, Species Fungorum (in the Catalogue of Life) accepts six species of Lasallia, although many more have been named in this genus.

- Lasallia caroliniana (Tuck.) Davydov, Peršoh & Rambold (2010)
- Lasallia freyana D.D.Awasthi (2007)
- Lasallia laceratula (Vain.) J.C.Wei & W. Guo (2019)
- Lasallia papulosa (Ach.) Llano (1950)
- Lasallia pensylvanica (Hoffm.) Llano (1950)
- Lasallia pustulata (L.) Mérat (1821)
- Lasallia rubiginosa (Pers.) Llano (1950)
