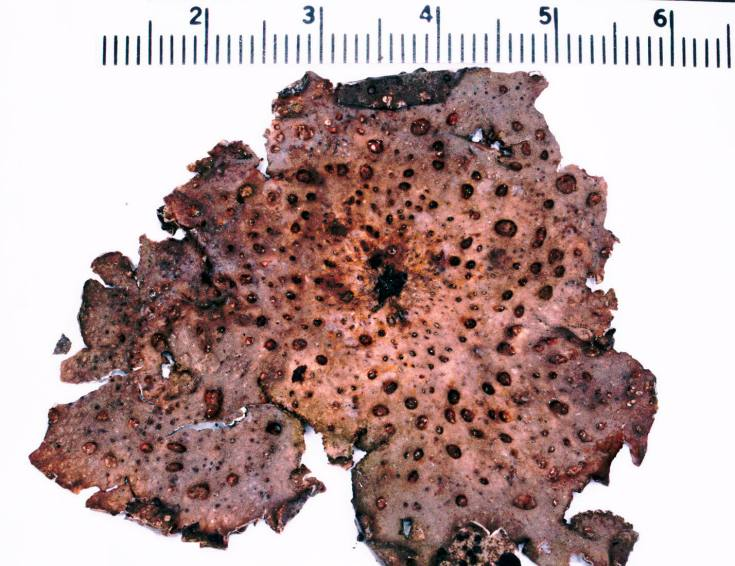
- photograph of a Lasallia papulosa herbarium specimen showing the lower surface with depressions. Growing on a boulder near cliffs at, Dolly Sods Wilderness, Monongahela National Forest, West Virginia. (scale marks = millimeters)

Conservation status
- Secure (NatureServe)

Scientific classification
- Kingdom: Fungi
- Division: Ascomycota
- Class: Lecanoromycetes
- Order: Umbilicariales
- Family: Umbilicariaceae
- Genus: Lasallia
- Species: L. papulosa

Binomial name
- Lasallia papulosa (Ach.) Llano (1950)

Synonyms
- Gyrophora papulosa Ach. (1810)

= Lasallia papulosa =

Species of fungus

Lasallia papulosa (common toadskin) is an umbilicate lichen (a lichen attached to its substrate at a single point). It is in the family Umbilicariaceae.
