= Alexis Boyer =

French surgeon

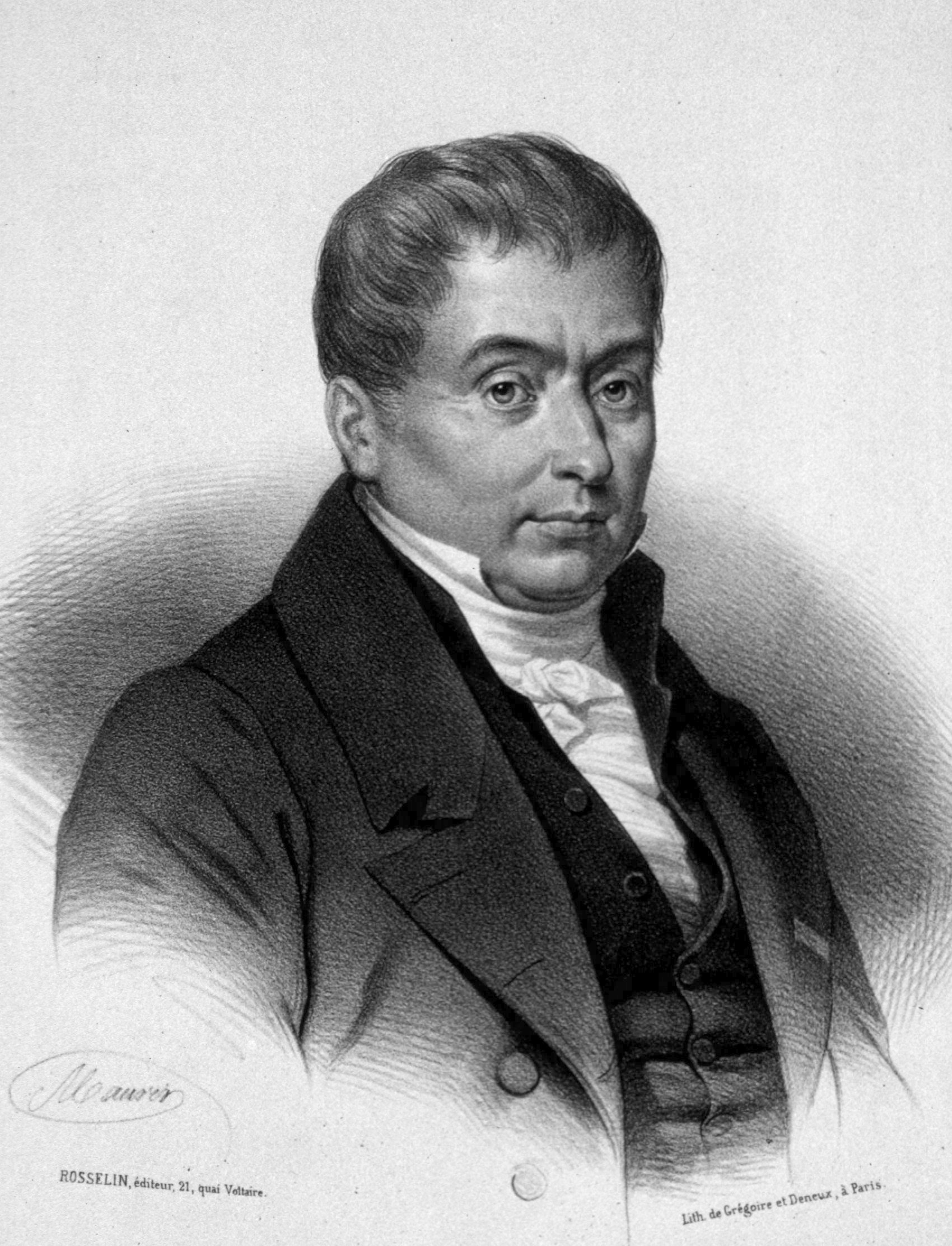

Alexis Boyer (1 March 1757 – 23 November 1833) was a French surgeon, born in Corrèze.

He was the son of a tailor, and he obtained his first medical knowledge in the shop of a barber surgeon. When he moved to Paris, he had the good fortune to attract the attention of renowned surgeons Antoine Louis (1723–1792) and Pierre-Joseph Desault (1744–1795). Boyer persevered at his profession, and became notorious for his anatomical knowledge and surgical dexterity. At the age of 37 he was appointed second surgeon to the Hôtel-Dieu in Paris. On the establishment of the École de Sante, he was named chair of operative surgery, but soon exchanged it for the chair of clinical surgery. Boyer specialized in urological pathology, especially disorders of micturition.

Boyer was a cautious and finicky physician, not always trusting of new innovations in treatment. He practiced and wrote with skill and sense. His two masterworks are Trait complet de l'anatomie (in 4 vols., 1797–1799), of which a fourth edition appeared in 1815, and Trait des maladies chirurgicales et des operations qui leur conviennent (in 2 vols., 1814–1826), of which a newer edition in seven volumes was published in 1844–1853 with additions by his son, Philippe Boyer (1801–1858).

In 1805, Napoleon promoted Boyer to the status of imperial family surgeon, and, after the successful campaigns of 1806 and 1807, conferred on him the Legion of Honor, with the title of baron of the empire and a salary of 25,000 francs. On the fall of Napoleon, Boyer's merits secured him the favor of the succeeding sovereigns of France, and he was consulting surgeon to Louis XVIII, Charles X, and Louis Philippe I. In 1825 Boyer succeeded J. F. L. Deschamps (1740–1824) as surgeon-in-chief at Hôpital de la Charité, and was chosen a member of the Institute. He died in Paris in 1833.
