= Hôpital de la Charité =

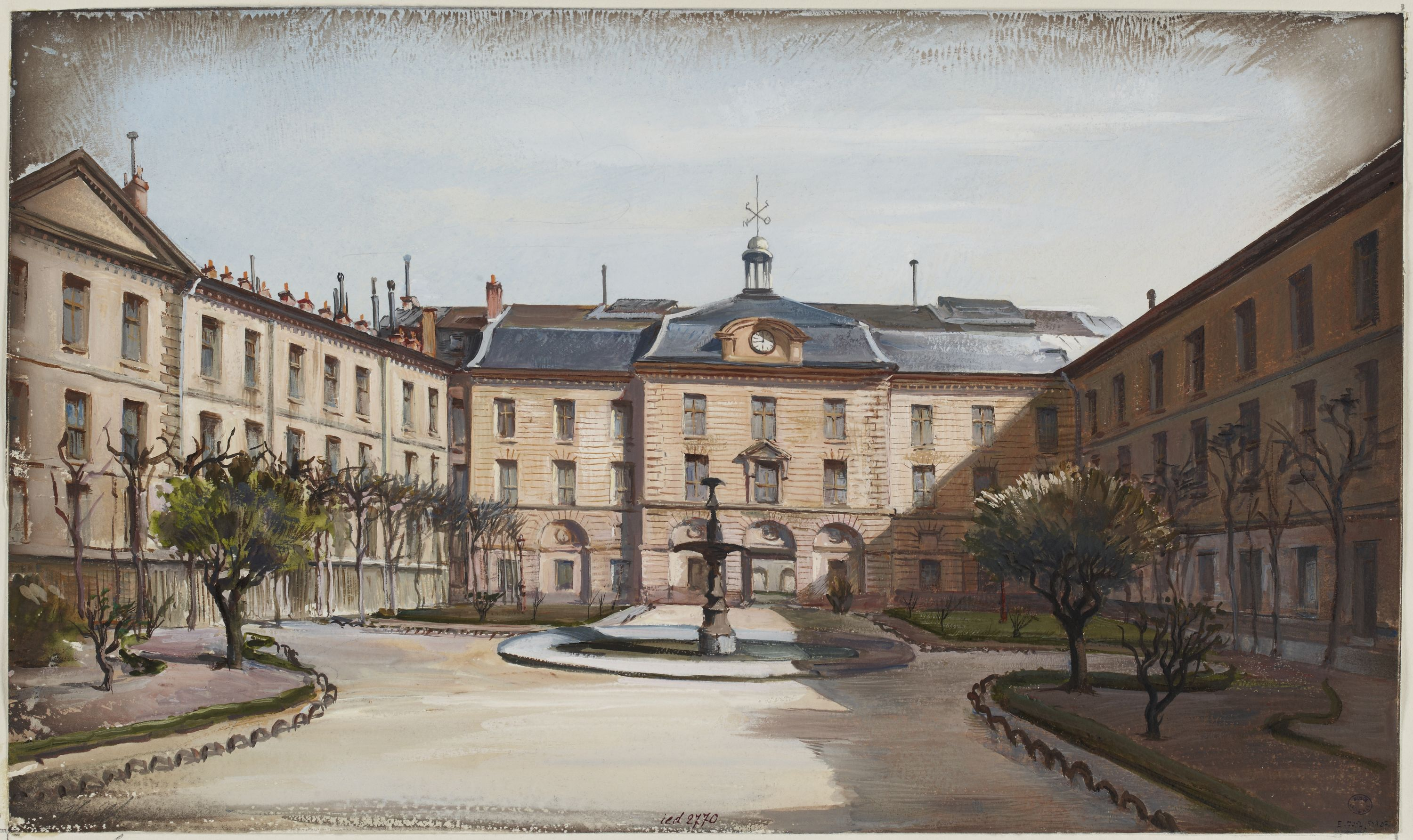
- The Infirmary of the Hospital of Charity, c. 1639; by Abraham Bosse

Geography
- Location: Paris, France
- Coordinates: 48.850795°N 2.341270°E (approximate)

History
- Opened: 17th Century
- Closed: 1935

Links
- Lists: Hospitals in France

Hôpital de la Charité (French pronunciation: [opital də la ʃaʁite], "Charity Hospital") was a hospital in Paris founded by the Brothers Hospitallers of St. John of God in the 17th century. In 1935, it was closed and demolished to make way for the new faculty of medicine. Located at 45, rue des Saints-Pères, the premises currently house the Saints-Pères university centre, one of the sites of the Paris Cité University.

== History ==
In 1601, Marie de Médicis, second wife of King Henry IV of France, invited the Brothers Hospitallers of St. John of God – commonly called "Brothers of Charity" – to come to France to care for the sick indigents. They were, by their order's rule, doctors and pharmacists who cared for the sick. They first occupied a house located rue de la Petite Seine (current locations of numbers 2-4 rue Bonaparte and 9 quai Malaquais).

A few years later, the Brothers had to move because, Marguerite de Valois, the first wife of Henri IV, had decided in 1607 to establish a convent there (future convent of the Petits-Augustins, established within the perimeter of the current National School of Fine Arts or Beaux-Arts de Paris). In exchange, she offered them the hôtel de Sansac, located near the chapel of Saint-Pierre (or Saints-Pères), which formed the original core of what was to become the hôpital de la Charité. The hospital was re-established there in 1608. It opened under the name of Saint Jean Baptiste de la Charité and was available only to male patients who did not suffer from incurable or venereal diseases.

From 1613 onwards, the Brothers engaged in a major construction project, which created several important hospital structures. They received from the abbot of Saint-Germain-des-Prés the use of the small Saint-Père chapel. The Brothers repaired the chapel and, ultimately, received it outright as a gift along with the small cemetery that was associated with it. The old chapel was demolished and a new one was consecrated in July 1621 by the Archbishop of Embrun. It was refurbished in the middle of the 17th century and, in 1732, a portal by the architect Robert de Cotte was added. The chapel still stands at the corner of the boulevard Saint-Germain and the rue des Saints-Pères.

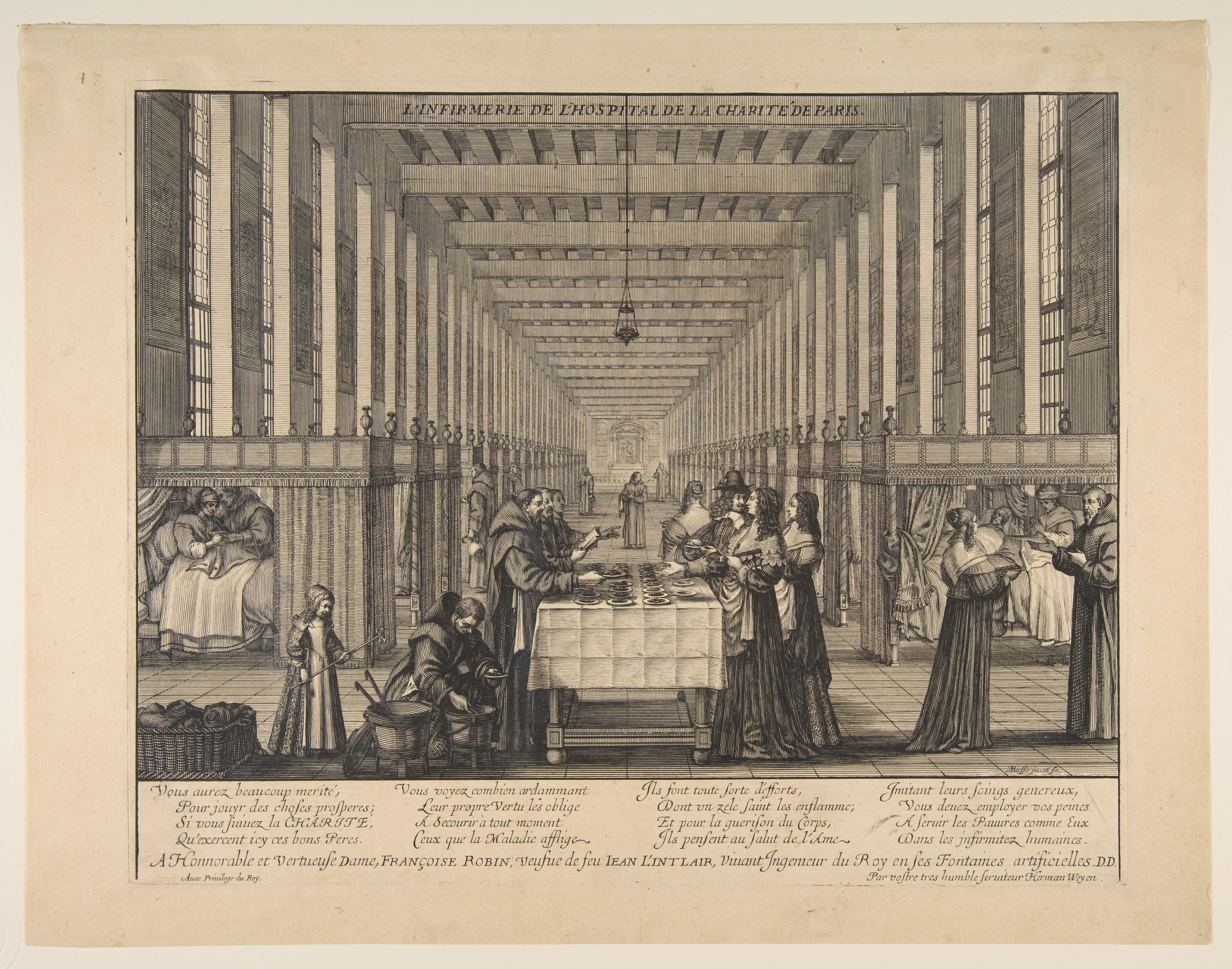
The Infirmary of the Hôpital, c. 1639; by Abraham Bosse

From 1652, the Brothers of Charity also acquired – thanks to an anonymous donation – a house on rue du Bac, which was initially equipped with eight beds for poor convalescents after their discharge from hospital. The establishment, called "Hospital for convalescents of Charité", was located on the south-west corner of rue du Bac and rue de Varenne and had extensive gardens. It had its origins in a foundation created in 1628 by Angélique Faure (1593-1664) (widow of the former finance superintendent Claude de Bullion de Bonnelles), though her identity as the donor was not revealed until after her death.

The Hospital for convalescents did not admit the sick, only convalescents who did not require medications and who were not infected with contagious diseases. The establishment employed no doctors, surgeons or apothecaries. Two monks and a servant (who were fed and housed according to the terms of a contract established on March 30, 1652) watched over the convalescents during their stay. Limited to fifteen days, this stay was intended to allow them to regain their strength and recover their health. It constituted an early form of follow-up care and rehabilitation.

The hospital was rebuilt again in 1778-1781. In 1786 it contained 208 beds in 6 rooms and had the reputation of being the best kept hospital in Paris. The Brothers of Charity also had under their care the Charity of Charenton, a hospital and insane asylum.

A detailed plan of the hospital in 1788 is included in Jacques-René Tenon's comprehensive analysis of Parisian hospitals: Mémoire sur les hôpitaux de Paris (Memoirs on the Hospitals of Paris.

In the late 18th-century, the hospital innovated in the delivery of clinical education; Louis Desbois de Rochefort (1750-1786) initiated bedside instruction for medical students that focused on the patients' symptoms and physical signs as diagnostic indicators, marking a major development in the history of medicine in France.

Rochefort was succeeded by his assistant Jean-Nicolas Corvisart in 1788, who questioned the traditional humoral theory, and employed more physical methods of diagnosis such as palpitation and percussion.

During the French Revolution, La Charité temporarily took the name of hospice de l'Unité. The Brothers of Charity were forced by the Revolutionary government to abandon the hospital in 1791 (though they continued to provide medical services there until their final departure in 1801) due to the confiscation of properties of the Catholic Church. The hospital was converted into a lay establishment governed by a commission of five members. At that time, women became eligible to be treated at the hospital.

A section of the hospital's gardens was ceded in the 18th century to the neighboring Society of Foreign Missions.

The French National Academy of Medicine had its offices in the hospital from 1850 to 1902.

== La Charité in the 20th century ==
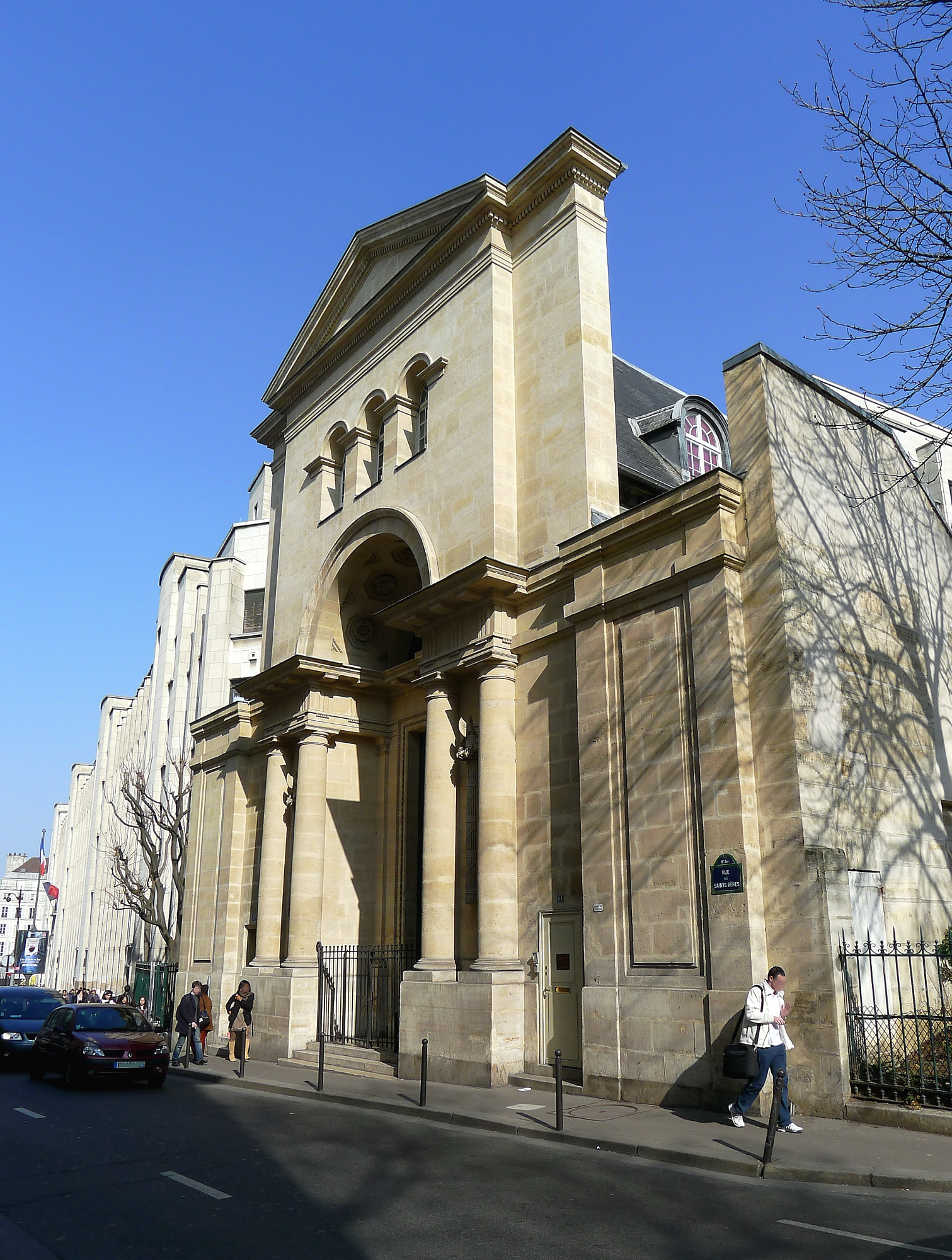
Cathedral of Saint Volodymyr the Great, 51 rue des Saints-Pères, 6th arrondissement of Paris

During the 1910 flood of the Seine, the basements of La Charité were flooded. Since the operations of the hospital were compromised, some of the patients were evacuated to other hospitals.

The buildings of the Charité hospital were almost totally demolished after 1935 to make way for the new Faculté de médecine de Paris.

In 1942, the old hospital chapel was converted into a church and later into the Cathedral of Saint Volodymyr the Great of the Ukrainian Catholic Eparchy of Saint Wladimir-Le-Grand de Paris.

== Practitioners who worked at the hospital ==
- François Gigot de la Peyronie (1665 – 1774)
- Jean-Joseph Sue, dit Sue de la Charité (1710 – 1792)
- Louis-Anne La Virotte (1725 – 1759)
- François Chopart (1743 – 1795)
- Pierre-Joseph Desault (1738 – 1795)
- Jean-Baptiste Dumangin (or Du Mangin) (1744 – 1826)
- Louis Desbois de Rochefort (1750 – 1786)
- Jean-Nicolas Corvisart (1755 – 1821)
- Jean-Joseph Sue or Jean-Joseph Sue (son) (1760 – 1830)
- Alexis Boyer (1757 – 1833)
- Pierre Éloi Fouquier (1776 – 1850)
- Philibert Joseph Roux (1780 – 1854)
- François Victor Mérat de Vaumartoise (1780 – 1851)
- René Laennec (1781 – 1826)
- Pierre François Olive Rayer (1793 – 1867)
- Pierre Adolphe Piorry (1794 – 1879)
- Alfred-Armand-Louis-Marie Velpeau (1795 – 1867)
- Gabriel Andral (1797 – 1876)
- Jean-Baptiste Bouillaud (1796 – 1881)
- Casimir Davaine (1812 – 1882)
- Jules Bernard Luys (1828 – 1897)
- Frédéric Labadie-Lagrave (1844 – 1917)
- Pierre-Constant Budin (1846 – 1907)
- Augusta Déjerine-Klumpke (1859 – 1927)
- Léon Charles Albert Calmette (1863 – 1933)
- Georges Guillain (1876 – 1961)
- Thérèse Bertrand-Fontaine (1895 – 1987)

== See also ==
- Dechristianization of France during the French Revolution
- Hôtel-Dieu
