= Musée de la Serrure =

Former museum in Paris, France

Coordinates: 48.8591°N 2.3619°E

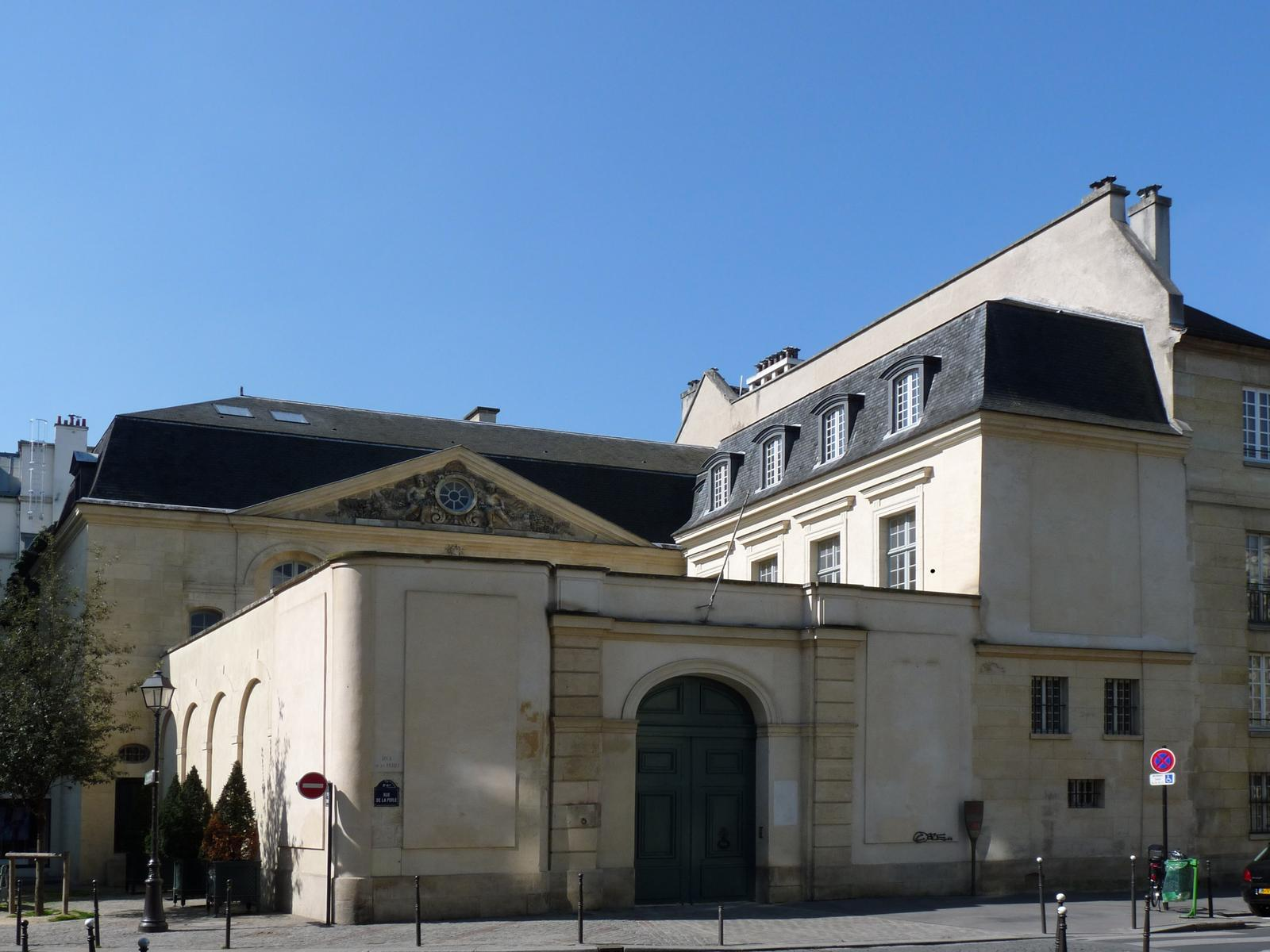
The Hôtel Libéral Bruant

The Musée de la Serrure, also known as the Musée de la Serrurerie or the Musée Bricard, was a private museum of locks and keys located in the 3rd arrondissement at 1 rue de la Perle, Paris, France. The museum closed in 2003.

The museum was established by the Bricard Company, and was located within the Hôtel Libéral Bruant (1685), the home of Libéral Bruant (1635-1697), Parisian architect of Les Invalides. It was dedicated to the art of keys, locks, and door knockers, and displayed an assortment of locks from Roman times to the present, including keys made of bronze and in Gallo-Roman iron, knockers from the Middle Ages, and locks and keys from the 16th through 19th centuries. The museum also had a locksmith's workshop, plus displays of ironworks.

== See also ==
- List of museums in Paris
