= Umbilicate lichen =

An umbilicate lichen is a lichen that is only attached to its substrate at a single point. An example is Lasallia papulosa.
