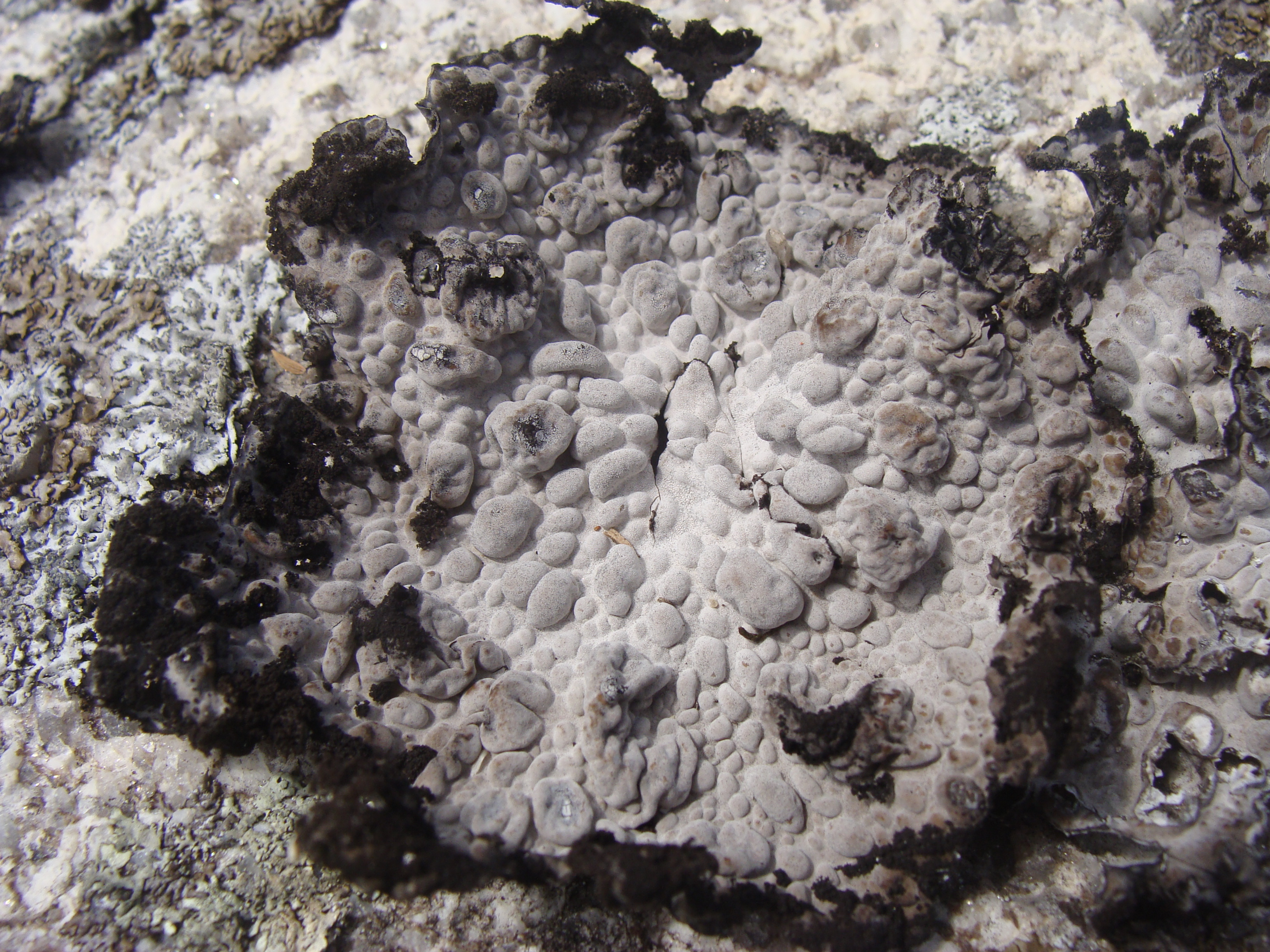

Scientific classification
- Kingdom: Fungi
- Division: Ascomycota
- Class: Lecanoromycetes
- Order: Umbilicariales
- Family: Umbilicariaceae
- Genus: Lasallia
- Species: L. pustulata

Binomial name
- Lasallia pustulata (L.) Mérat (1821)

Synonyms
- Umbilicaria pustulata Lecidea pustulata Capnia pustulata Gyrophora pustulata Macrodictya pustulata Gyromium pustulatum

= Lasallia pustulata =

Species of lichen-forming fungus

Lasallia pustulata is a species of lichen in the family Umbilicariaceae. It is the type species of its genus Lasallia.

== See also ==
- List of lichens named by Carl Linnaeus
