= Dricourt =

- Commune
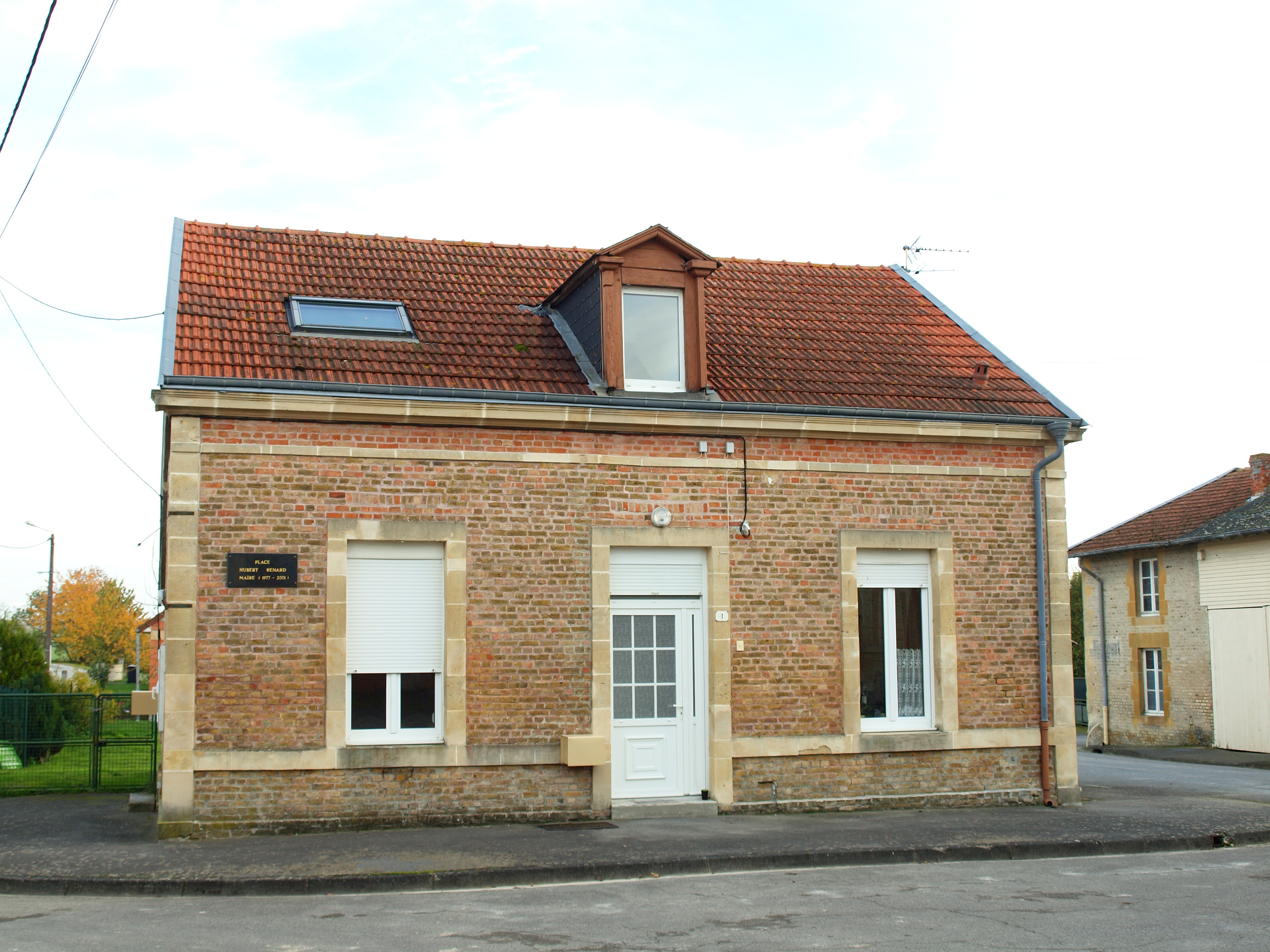
- The town hall in Dricourt
- Location of Dricourt
- Location within France Location within Grand Est
- Coordinates: 49°23′46″N 4°30′49″E
- Country: France
- Region: Grand Est
- Department: Ardennes
- Arrondissement: Vouziers
- Canton: Attigny
- Intercommunality: Argonne Ardennaise

Government
  - Mayor (2020–2026): Olivier Raulet
- Area^{1}: 7.12 km^{2} (2.75 sq mi)
- Elevation: 115 m (377 ft)
- Highest elevation: 167 m (548 ft)
- Lowest elevation: 107 m (351 ft)
- Population (2023): 70
  - Density: 9.8/km^{2} (25/sq mi)
- Time zone: UTC+01:00 (CET)
  - Summer (DST): UTC+02:00 (CEST)
- INSEE/Postal code: 08147 /08310
- ^{1} French Land Register data, which excludes lakes, ponds, glaciers > 1 km^{2} (0.386 sq mi or 247 acres) and river estuaries.

Dricourt (French pronunciation: [dʁikuʁ]) is a commune in the Ardennes department in northern France.

== Population ==
Historical population
Year	Pop.	±% p.a.
1968	119	—
1975	73	−6.74%
1982	79	+1.13%
1990	120	+5.36%
1999	87	−3.51%
2007	85	−0.29%
2012	88	+0.70%
2017	84	−0.93%
2023	70	−2.99%
Source: INSEE

== See also ==
- Communes of the Ardennes department
