= François Victor Mérat de Vaumartoise =

French physician, botanist and mycologist

François Victor Mérat de Vaumartoise (5 July 1780 in Paris – 13 March 1851 in Paris) was a French medical doctor, botanist and mycologist.

In 1803 he obtained his medical doctorate with a thesis on heavy metal poisoning, afterwards serving as chef de clinique at the Hôpital de la Charité in Paris. He was a member of the Académie nationale de médecine, a correspondent member of the Société linnéenne de Lyon (1824–1851) and a member of the Société nationale et centrale d'agriculture. He was an Officer of the Légion d'honneur (1847) and a Chevalier of the Order du Christ de Portugal (1828).

He expanded the work reported in his doctoral dissertation with additional reports on the effects of heavy metal poisoning in craftsmen. During his ten years at Charité he treated and cured numerous patients with lead poisoning.

He was the taxonomic authority of the lichenized fungi genus Lasallia and of the botanical genera Corvisartia (family Asteraceae), Lerouxia (family Primulaceae) and Robertia (family Ranunculaceae). His botanical and medical interest met in his report on the use of pomegranate root to fight tapeworm infections. He received a monetary award from the Academy of Sciences for this work.

== Written works ==
With Adrien Jacques de Lens, he was co-author of a medical dictionary, titled "Dictionnaire universel de matière médicale et de thérapeutique générale", published in seven volumes from 1829 to 1846. Other written efforts by Mérat de Vaumartoise include:

- Traité de la colique métallique, vulgairement appelée colique des peintres, des plombiers, de Poitou, etc.; avec une description de la colique végétale, et un mémoire sur le tremblement des doreurs sur métaux, (Paris: Méquignon-Marvis, 1812).
- Nouvelle flore des environs de Paris suivant le système sexuel de Linnée, avec l'indication des vertus des plantes usitées en médecine, des détails sur leur emploi pharmaceutique. Paris : Méquignon-Marvis, 1812.
- Éléments de botanique, à l'usage des personnes qui suivent les cours du Jardin du Roi et de la Faculté de médecine de Paris. Paris : Crochard, 1822.
- Nouvelle flore des environs de Paris : suivant le système sexuel de Linèe; avec l'indication, des vertus des plantes usitèes en Mèdecine T. 1 La cryptogamie : Paris Mèquignon-Marvis 1836.
- Revue de la flore parisienne, suivie du texte du « Botanicon parisiense » de Vaillant avec les noms linnéens en regard. Paris : J.-B. Baillière, 1843.
- Mémoire sur la possibilité de cultiver le Thé en pleine terre et en grande en France. Paris: M^{me} V^{e} Bouchard—Huzàrd, 1844.

Toward the end of his life Dr. Merat published a bibliography of his 213 printed works. In the introduction he stated: "At the age of seventy and at an advanced stage in my career, I felt I had to print an inventory of my work, to remind myself of the number and nature of my works over the past half-century. Study has been my constant need, I owe it the quiet days of my simple and busy life; it made me forget, on a few occasions, the pains attached to our human nature, and from which my obscurity has not always been able to remove me."
