= King Gustav III of Sweden and His Brothers =

1771 painting by Alexander Roslin

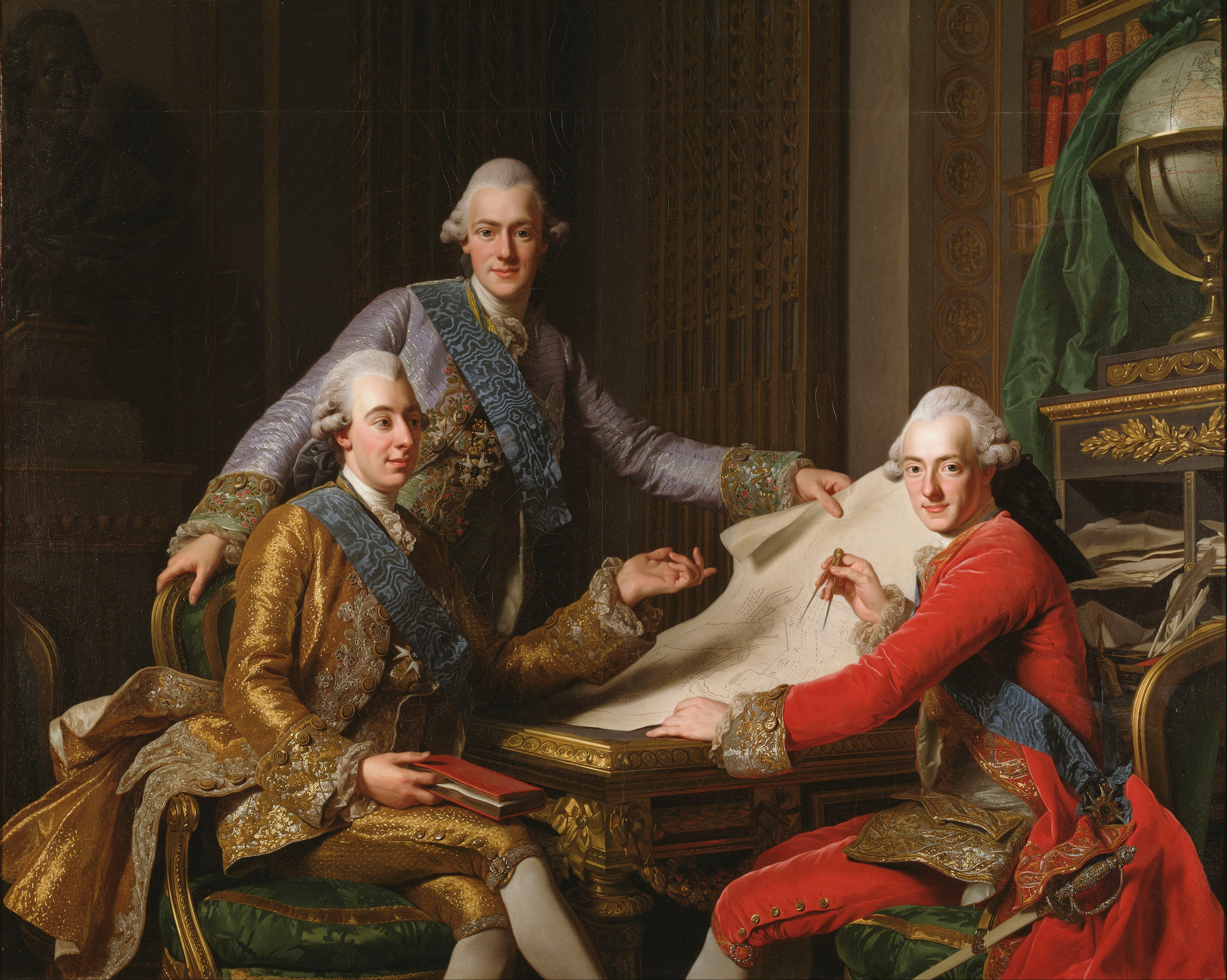
- Artist: Alexander Roslin
- Year: 1771
- Medium: Oil on canvas
- Dimensions: 203 cm × 162 cm (80 in × 64 in)
- Location: Nationalmuseum, Stockholm
- Owner: Nationalmuseum, Stockholm

King Gustav III of Sweden and His Brothers is an oil painting by the Swedish portrait painter Alexander Roslin showing Gustav with his two brothers, Prince Frederick Adolf and Prince Charles, later Charles XIII of Sweden. Frederick is standing, Gustav is sitting to the left, and Charles is to the right. The painting is in the collection of the Swedish National Museum.

The painting has Alexander Roslin's signature in French: Roslin à Paris 1771. Roslin had settled in Paris in 1752; by the time he painted this triple portrait Roslin had already been living in Paris for nineteen years. He would remain there for the rest of his life.

== Portraits of the Swedish royal family ==
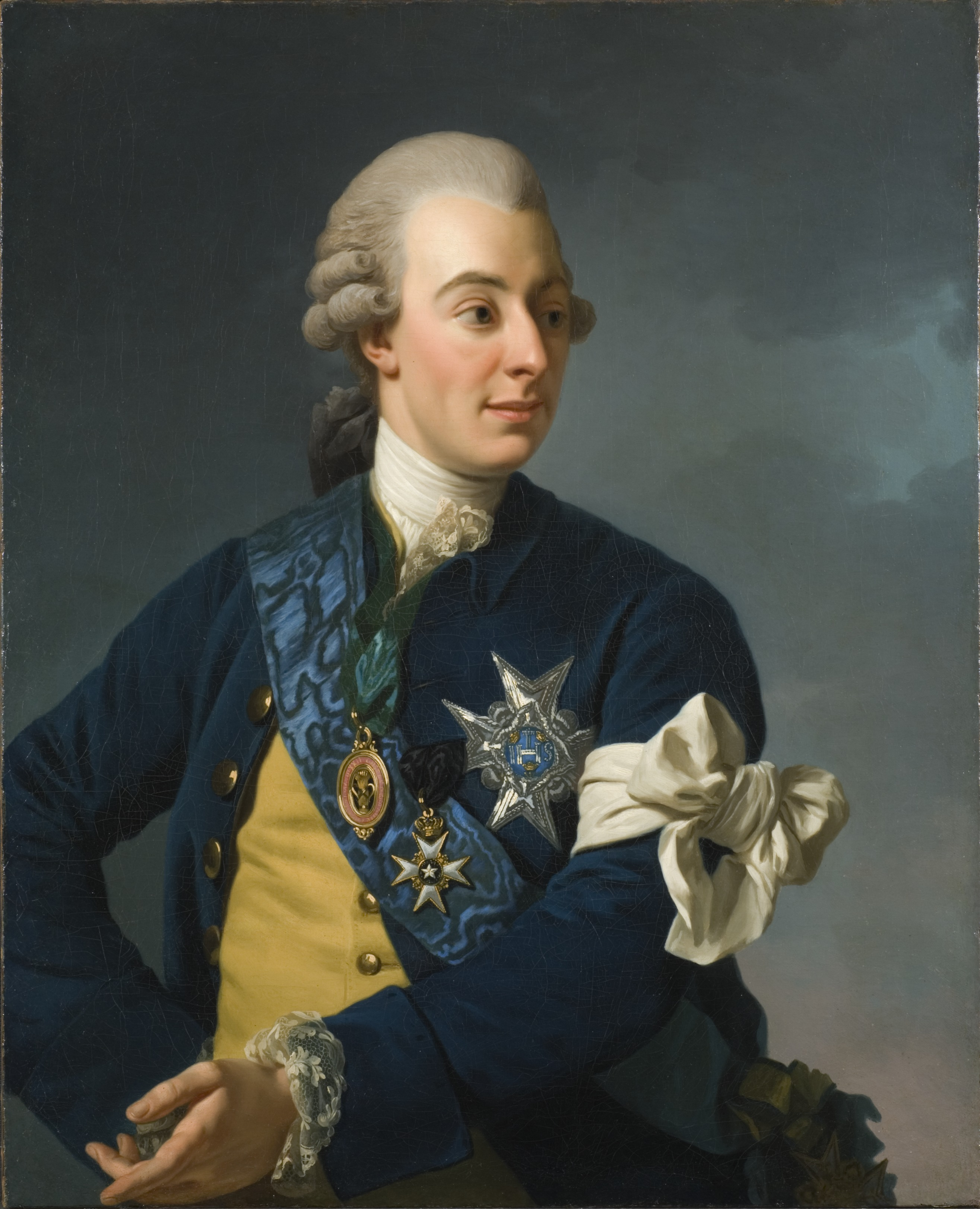
Alexander Roslin – Gustav III

In the same year that Roslin moved to Paris, he was elected to be a member of the French Académie royale de peinture et de sculpture, a great honour for an artist from outside France.

Roslin was commissioned to paint the portraits of numerous European aristocrats, not only in Paris but also from St. Petersburg, Bayreuth and Stockholm. Carrying out these commissions meant that he travelled widely – for example, Roslin spent two years in the service of Catherine II in St Petersburg. Gustav III attracted artists to his court. Sweden's royal family were the patrons of Roslin and he maintained contacts with them throughout his career. A number of different compositions both half-length portraits of Gustav III, and portraits in full-figure were painted of the royal family by Roslin. He also painted numerous portraits of Swedes who visited Paris. Like a court painter, Roslin was able to vary the portraits of the same person giving them different attributes and accessories to give a varied air to the paintings. The 18th century was a period of regeneration and reconstruction in Sweden as the country had been devastated and weakened by the huge costs of King Charles XII's wars. Gustav III's role now was to consolidate the country. In another painting by Roslin he is depicted as an allegoric interpretation of his role as Sweden's "Hercules who will crush the Hydra of anarchy and discord." Therefore, Gustav III was painted dressed in armour, the crown and wearing the grand star of the Order of the Seraphim, a Swedish royal order initiated by King Frederick I in 1748, only awarded to members of the royal family and foreign heads of state as well.

These new commissions were promoting Roslin's career in France, since the new king was pleased with his works and gave him several new commissions. To this was added a new group portrait commissioned by the king, depicting the three royal brothers.

== The portrait of the three brothers ==
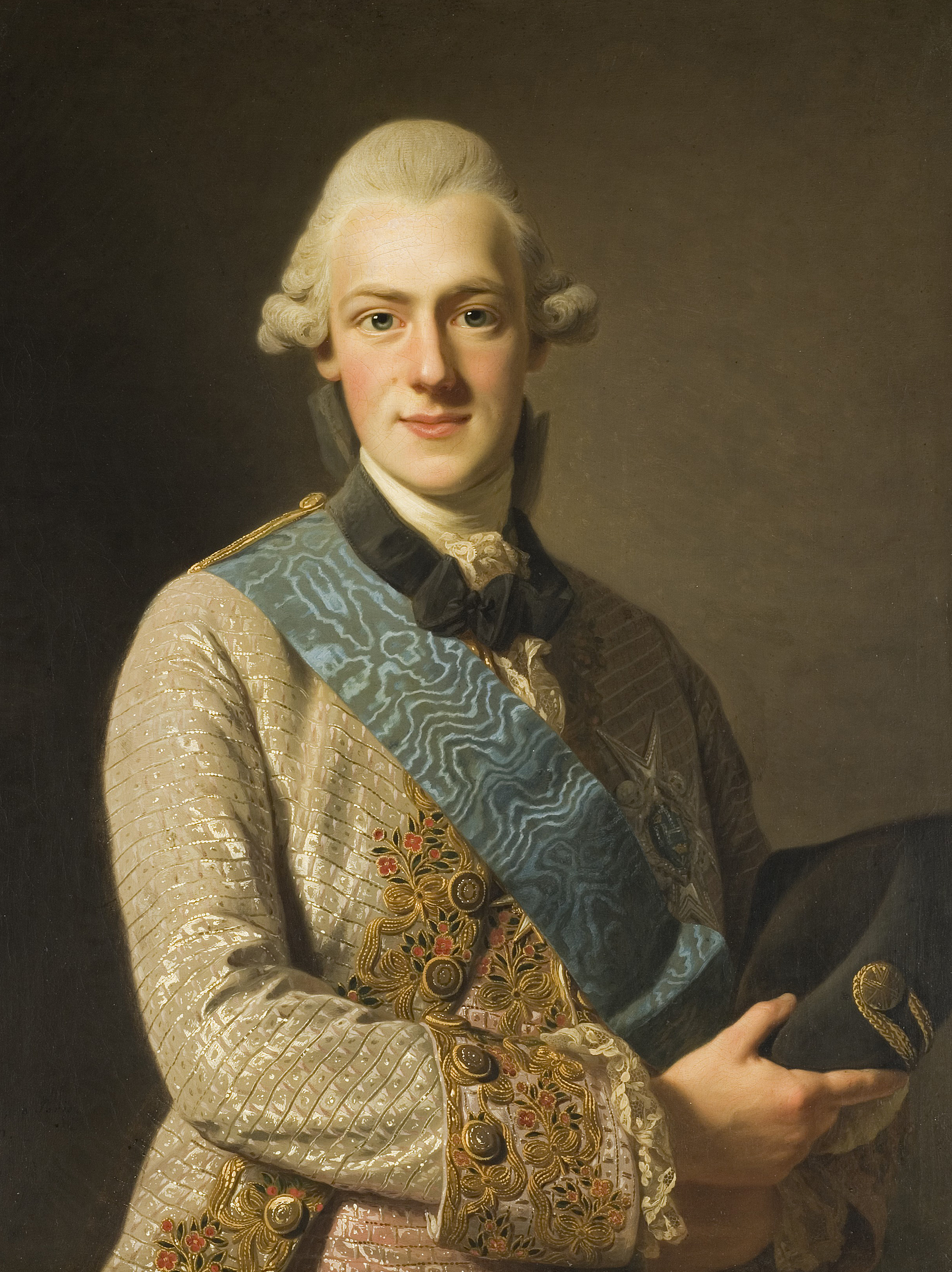
Prince Frederick Adolf of Sweden, Frederick's single portrait

Roslin was required to compose a group portrait in a new configuration, and he chose a triangular composition, with half-length portraits of the three princes seated round a table studying a plan of fortifications. The artist faced a difficulty, in that the princes had not sat all together at the same time for him.

The prince, who would be crowned King Gustav III of Sweden, traveled to France on February 4, 1771 together with his brother Fredrick. Roslin had received the commission for the triple portrait a few months earlier, and had already depicted Karl (Charles XIII of Sweden) before he left the country prior to his brothers' arrival. New sittings now followed; in the mornings the Crown Prince and his younger brother participated in sittings held in Roslin's studio. By that time Roslin was already flooded with a series of royal commissions.

Because none of the brothers sat together at the depicted table in reality, the trio look as if they are not interacting with each other, nor studying the plan. They are somewhat disconnectedly pointing to the plan on the table, but the weakness of this is counterbalanced with Roslin's eminent ability to render fabrics and his presentation of the subjects of his painting wearing colourful clothes. The elegant external appearances are depicted in a lifelike manner. However this was a portrait of princes, and thus demanded a decorum that dignified the models: "Gustav III and his brothers could hardly be portrayed as sweaty campaigners despite the gravity of their doings." The painting is held by the Swedish National Museum.

The presentation is seen as being conflicted by competing considerations and goals. This was part of a series of royal portraits wherein the brothers were depicted separately in different situations and accoutrement. The attire was changed for allegorical effect.

== See also ==
- Gustavian era
