= The Lady with the Veil =

1768 painting by Alexander Roslin

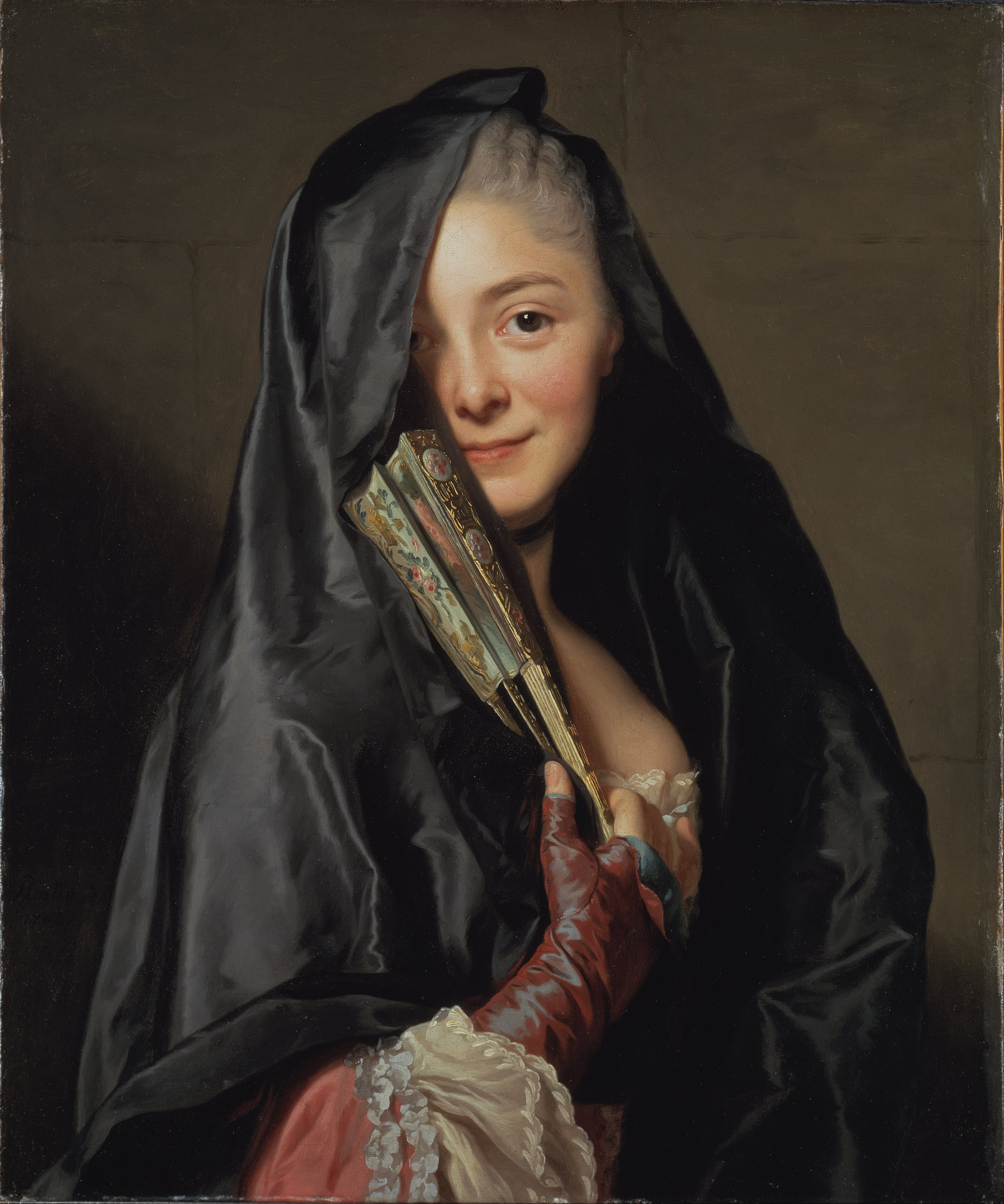
- Artist: Alexander Roslin
- Year: 1768
- Medium: oil on canvas
- Dimensions: 65 cm × 54 cm (26 in × 21 in)
- Location: Nationalmuseum, Stockholm

The Lady with the Veil, The Lady with the Fan, or The Veiled Lady is a 1768 oil-on-canvas portrait by Alexander Roslin of his wife Marie-Suzanne Giroust in Bolognese dress. The painting was displayed at the Salon of 1769 at the Louvre in Paris. The work was mentioned in an inventory from Österbybruk as Portrait of the One-Eyed Woman; it is now in the Nationalmuseum in Stockholm under its current title. It was featured in the 1972 Swedish series of stamps Gustaviansk konst.
