= Marie-Suzanne Giroust =

French artist (1734–1772)

Marie-Suzanne Giroust Roslin
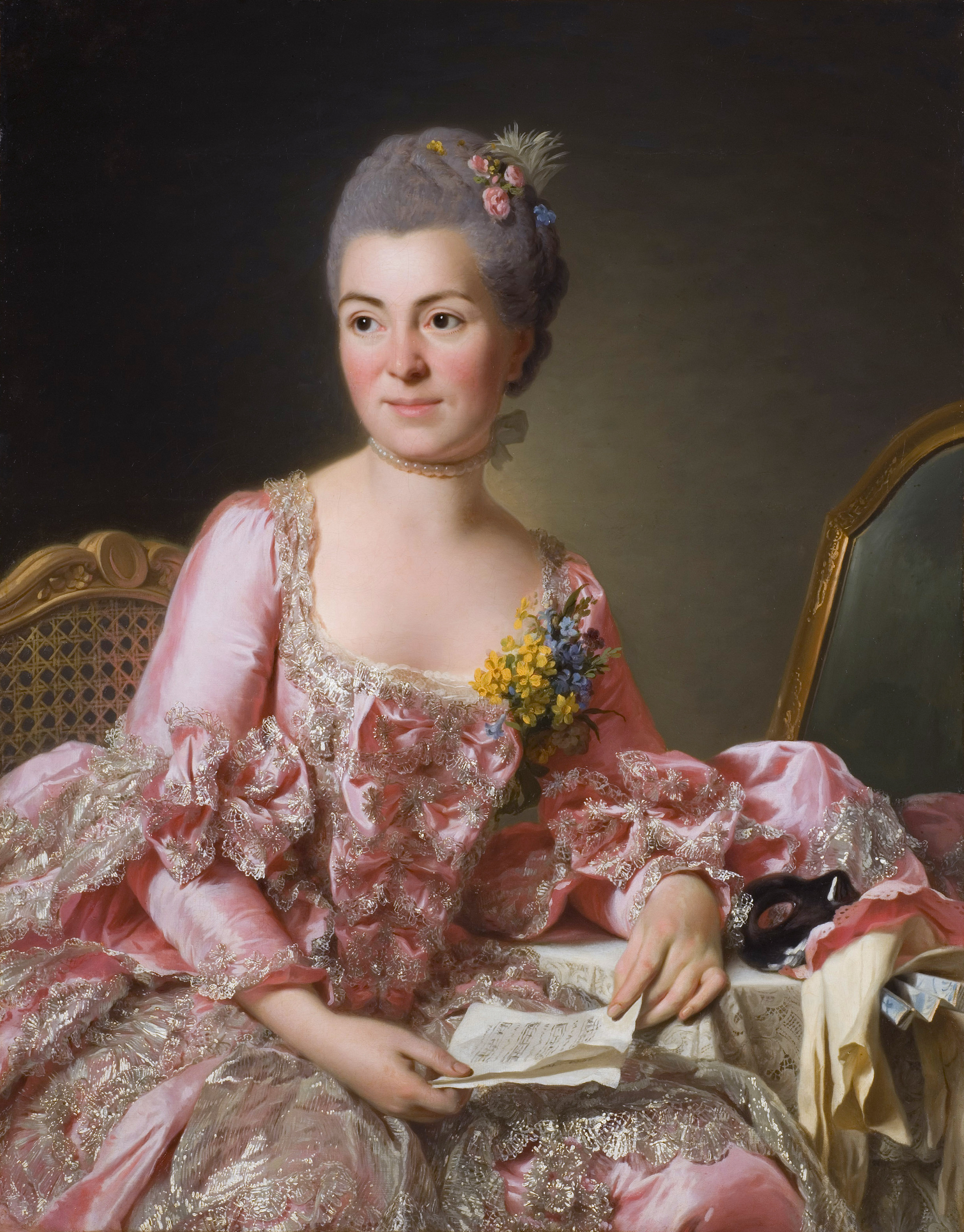
- Portrait by Alexander Roslin, 1770
- Born: 9 March 1734; Paris, France
- Died: 31 August 1772 (aged 38); Paris, France
- Education: Maurice Quentin de La Tour, Joseph-Marie Vien
- Known for: Pastel
- Spouse: Alexander Roslin (m. 1759)
- Children: 6 including: Augustine-Suzanne Roslin (1760–1831); Alexandrine Elisabeth Roslin (1761–1797); Alexandre Antoine Roslin (1764–1799); Joseph Alexandre Roslin (1772–1794)

Marie-Suzanne Giroust (9 March 1734 – 31 August 1772), known as Madame Roslin, was a French painter, miniaturist, and pastellist, known for her portraits. She was a member of the Académie royale de peinture et de sculpture. Only a small number of her works have been identified.

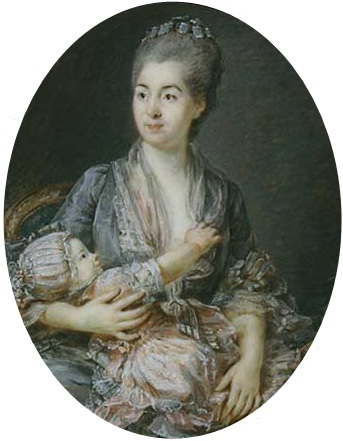
Marie-Suzanne Giroust-Roslin with her daughter. Miniature painting on ivory by Peter Adolf Hall 1770. Louvre Museum, Paris.

== Biography ==
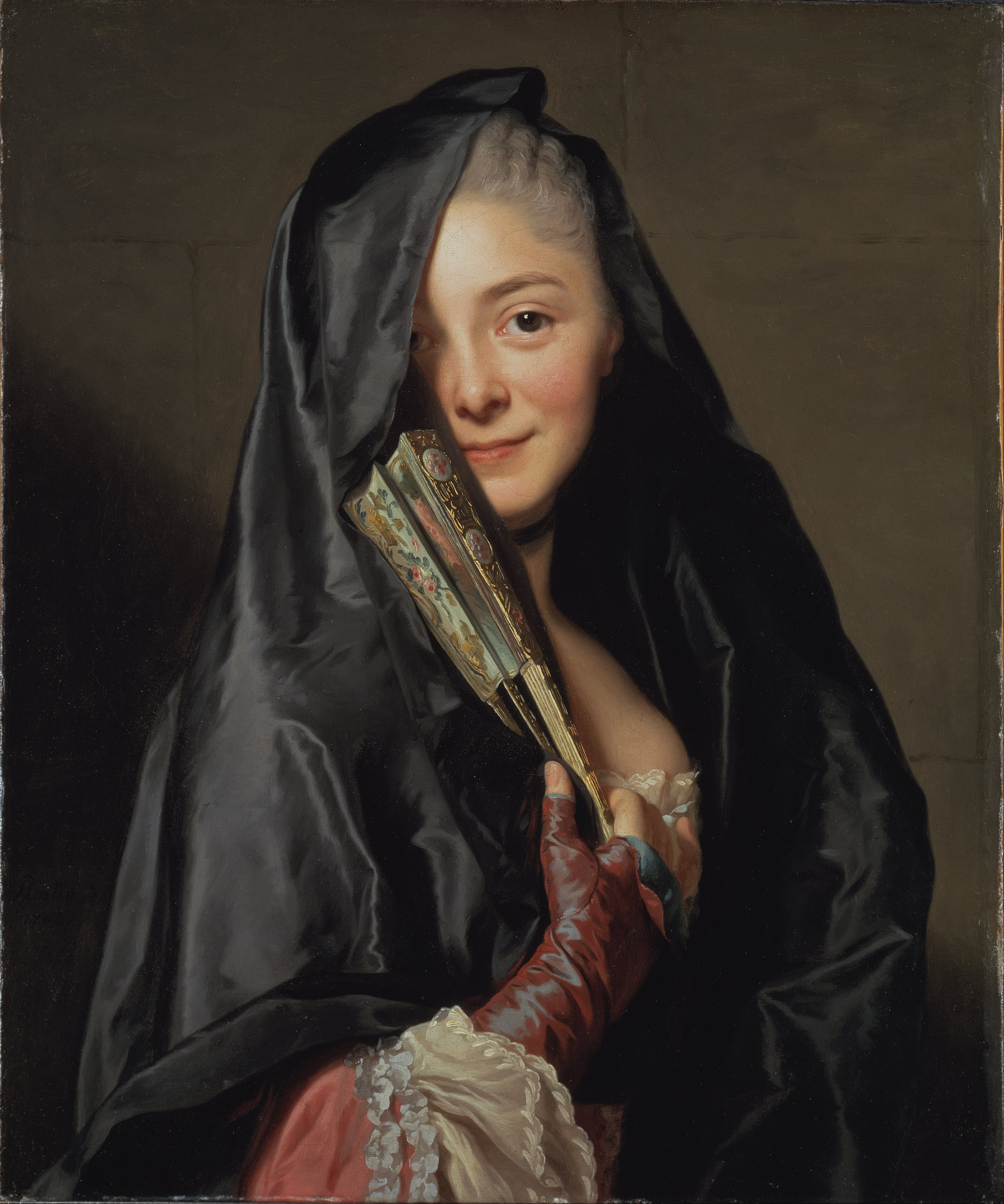
Marie-Suzanne Giroust Roslin by Alexander Roslin (La Dame au voile, 1768).

Marie-Suzanne Giroust was born and lived her whole life in Paris. She was the daughter of Barthélemy Giroust (d. 1741), Jeweller to Le Garde-robe de roi (the King's Wardrobe) and Marie Suzanne Le Roy (d. 1745). Orphaned at an early age, she was raised by relatives. She studied art under Maurice Quentin de La Tour and then of Joseph-Marie Vien. The teachings of Vien, in particular, affected her own art greatly.

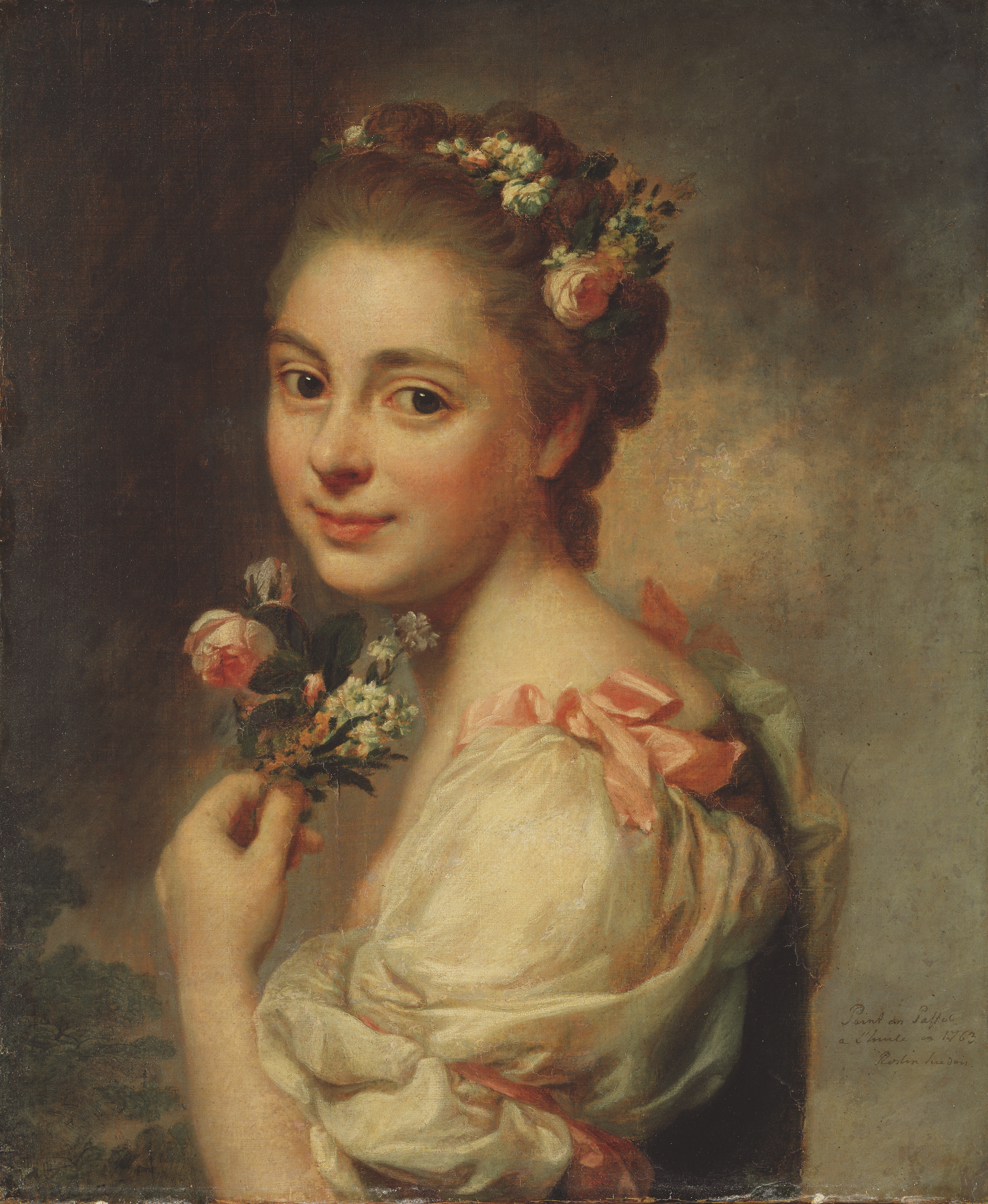
Marie Suzanne née Giroust (by Alexander Roslin) ca. 1763.

Giroust was active as an artist from the 1750s. She met the Swedish artist Alexander Roslin at Vien's studio in 1752. She wished to marry him, but was prevented by her guardian and family, who disliked Roslin because he was poor and a Protestant. After rejecting the suitors suggested by her guardian, she was allowed to marry Roslin after mediation from Roslin's patron, the Comte de Caylus. The marriage occurred on 5 January 1759, with the Swedish ambassador as a witness. The couple had three daughters and three sons.

Giroust was a pastel painter. Her husband once estimated that she was a better pastellist than he was. In 1770, Giroust was admitted to the Académie royale de peinture et de sculpture in Paris. She was one of only fifteen women to be accepted as full academicians in the 145-year history of the institution. Her reception piece, Portrait of the Sculptor Jean-Baptiste Pigalle (1770), was praised by Denis Diderot in 1771 for its "beautiful and strong colors."

Giroust served as a model for La Dame au voile (The Lady with the Veil) (1768), painted by her husband. She also appears in Alexander Roslin's group portrait The Artist and His Wife Marie-Suzanne Giroust Portraying Henrik Wilhelm Peill (1767).

Marie-Suzanne Giroust died of breast cancer in 1772, aged 38.

== Notable works ==
- Self-Portrait with Her Teacher, Maurice Quentin de La Tour (ca. 1760; private collection)
- Portrait of Henrik Vilhelm Peill (1766; private collection)
- Portrait of Jacques Dumont "le Romain" (ca. 1770–71; Musée national des châteaux de Versailles et de Trianon)
- Portrait of the Sculptor Jean-Baptiste Pigalle (1771; Paris, Louvre)
- Portrait of the Architect Marie-Joseph Peyre (1730–1785) (1771; Stockholm, Nationalmuseum)

== Gallery ==
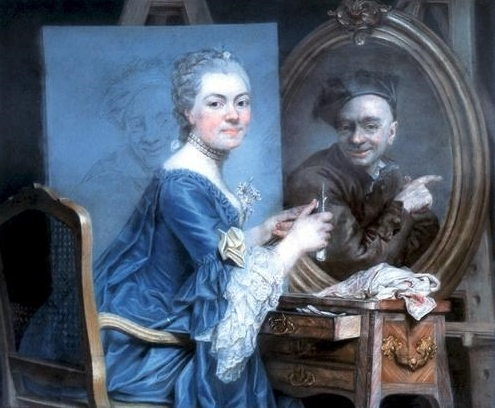
Self-Portrait with Her Teacher, Maurice Quentin de La Tour (ca. 1760)

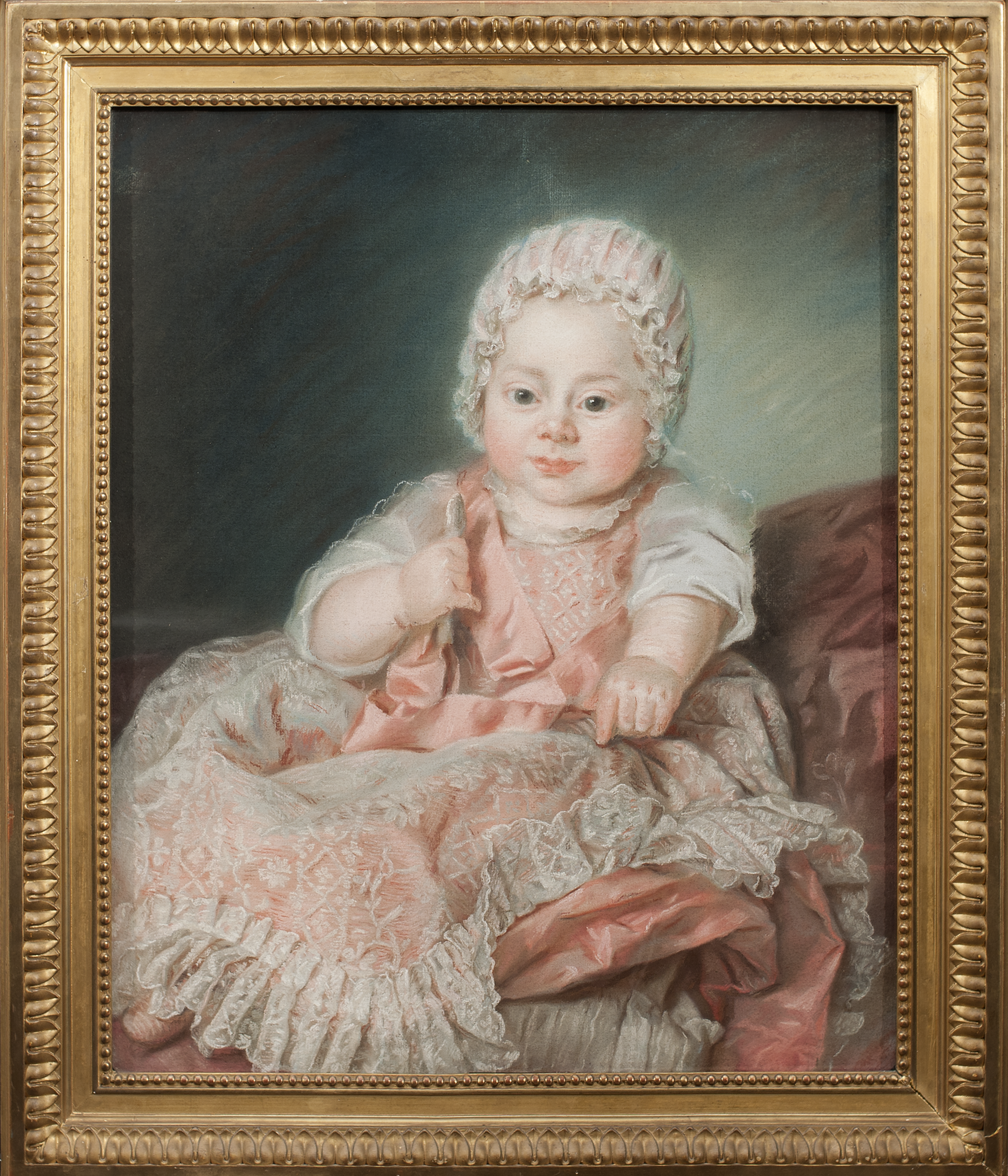
Portrait of Alexandre Antoine Roslin (1764–1799), married to Adelaïde Abraham, son of the artist, pastel on paper (date unknown). National Museum, Centre Culturel Suédois (Institut Tessin), Paris.

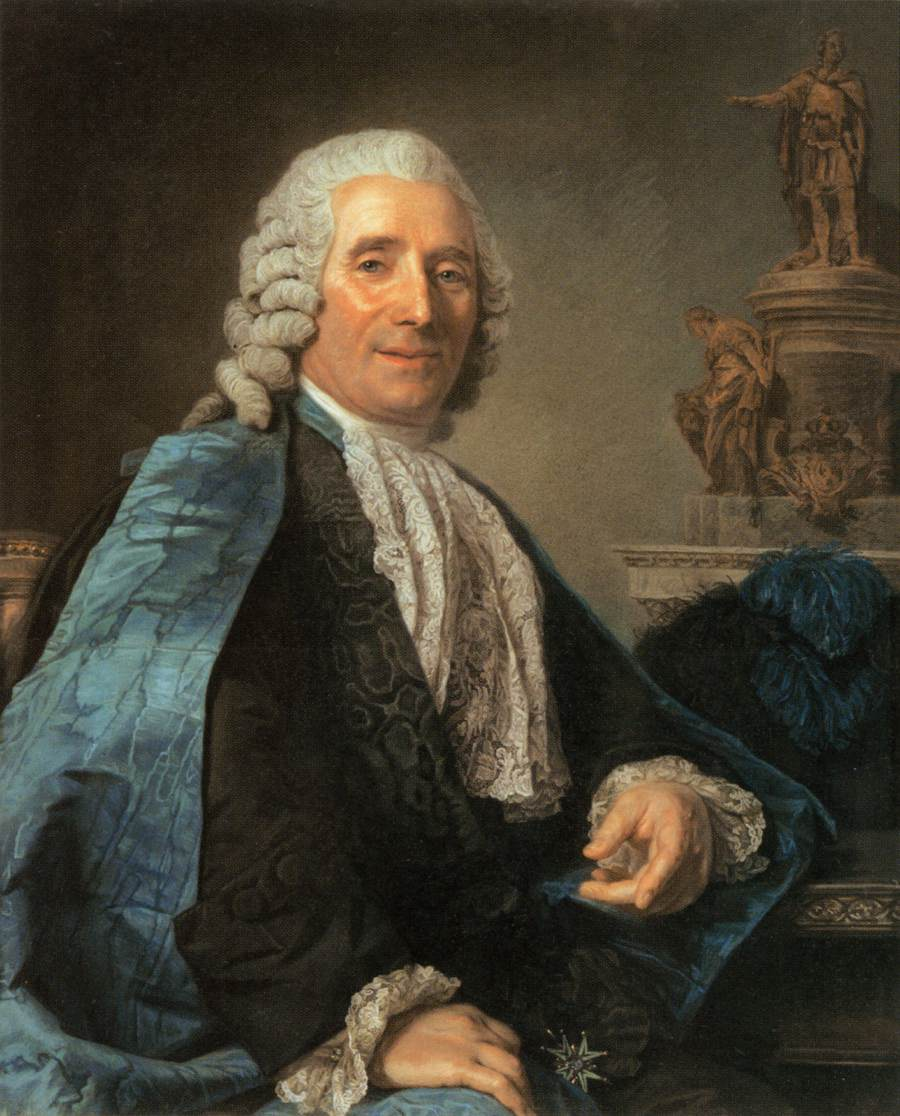
Portrait of the Sculptor Jean-Baptiste Pigalle (1770)

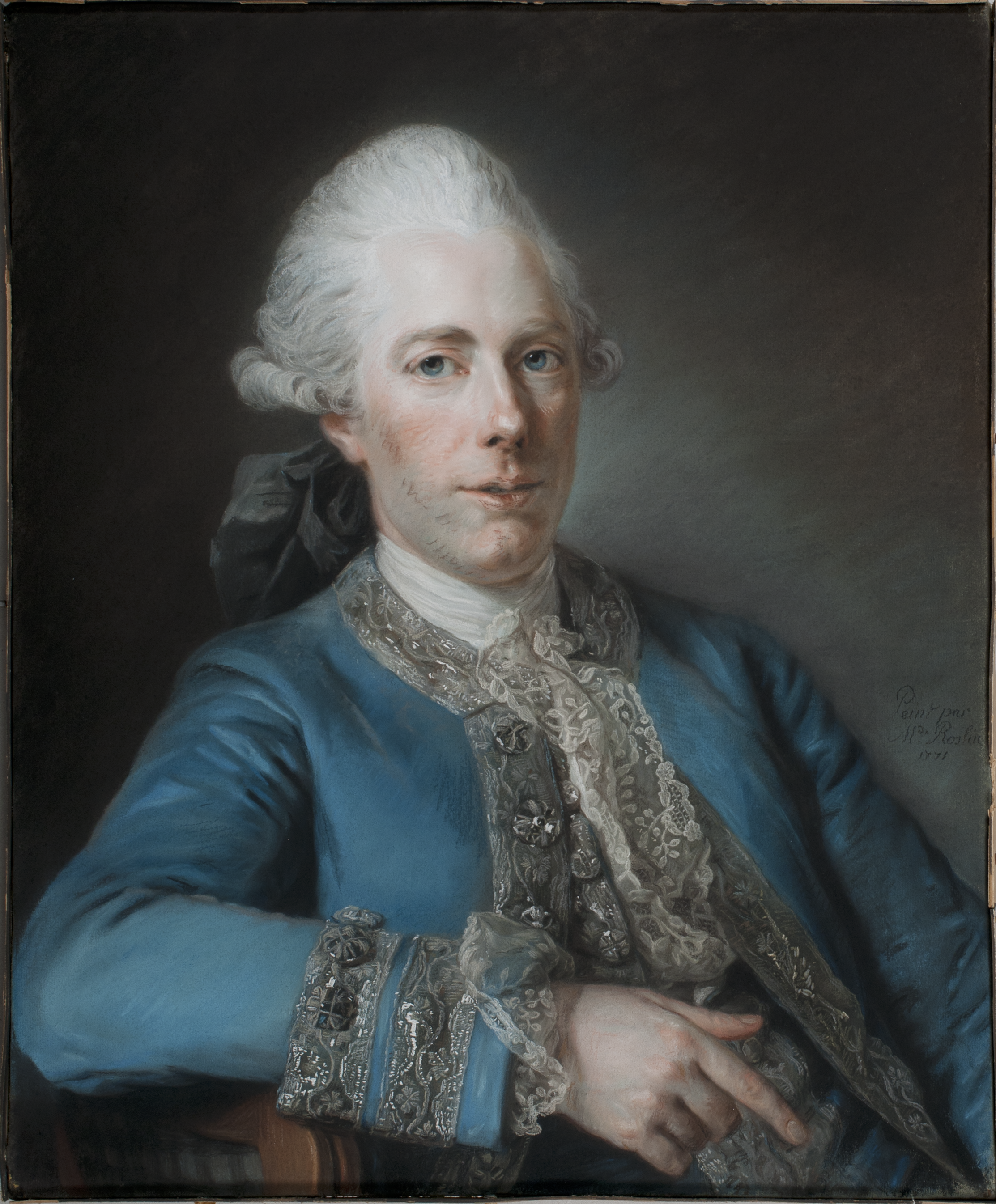
Portrait of the Architect Marie-Joseph Peyre (1771), Nationalmuseum, Stockholm.

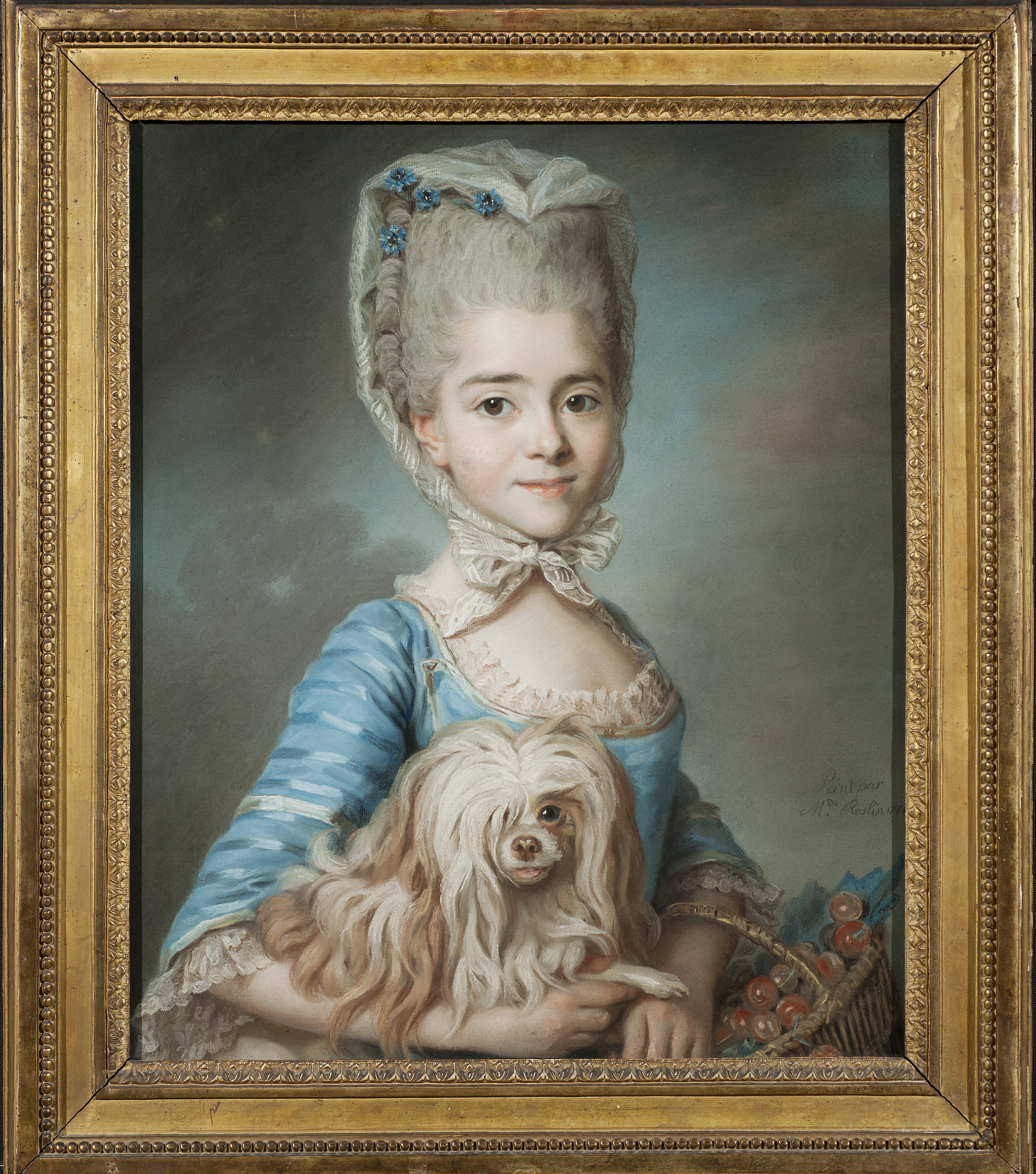
Portrait of Augustine-Suzanne Roslin (1760–1831), married to Louis Suzanne Claire Carteron de Barmont, the artist's daughter, pastel on paper (1771). National Museum, Centre Culturel Suédois (Institut Tessin), Paris.

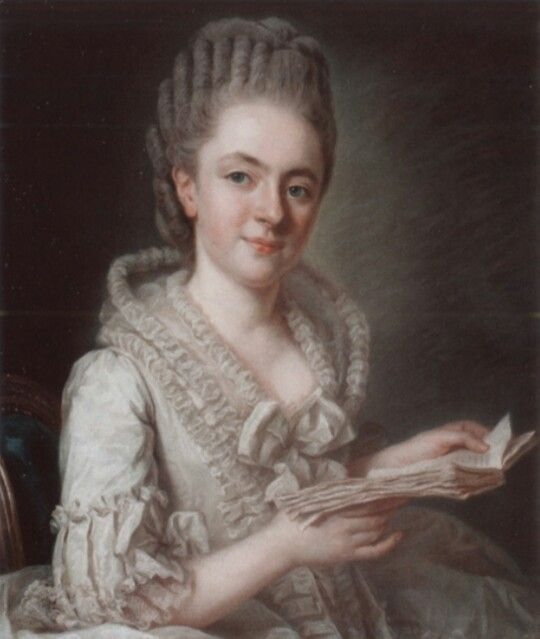
Portrait de Mme Pierre-Adolphe Hall, née Adélaïde Gobin (1771).
