= Alexander Roslin =

Swedish painter (1718–1793)

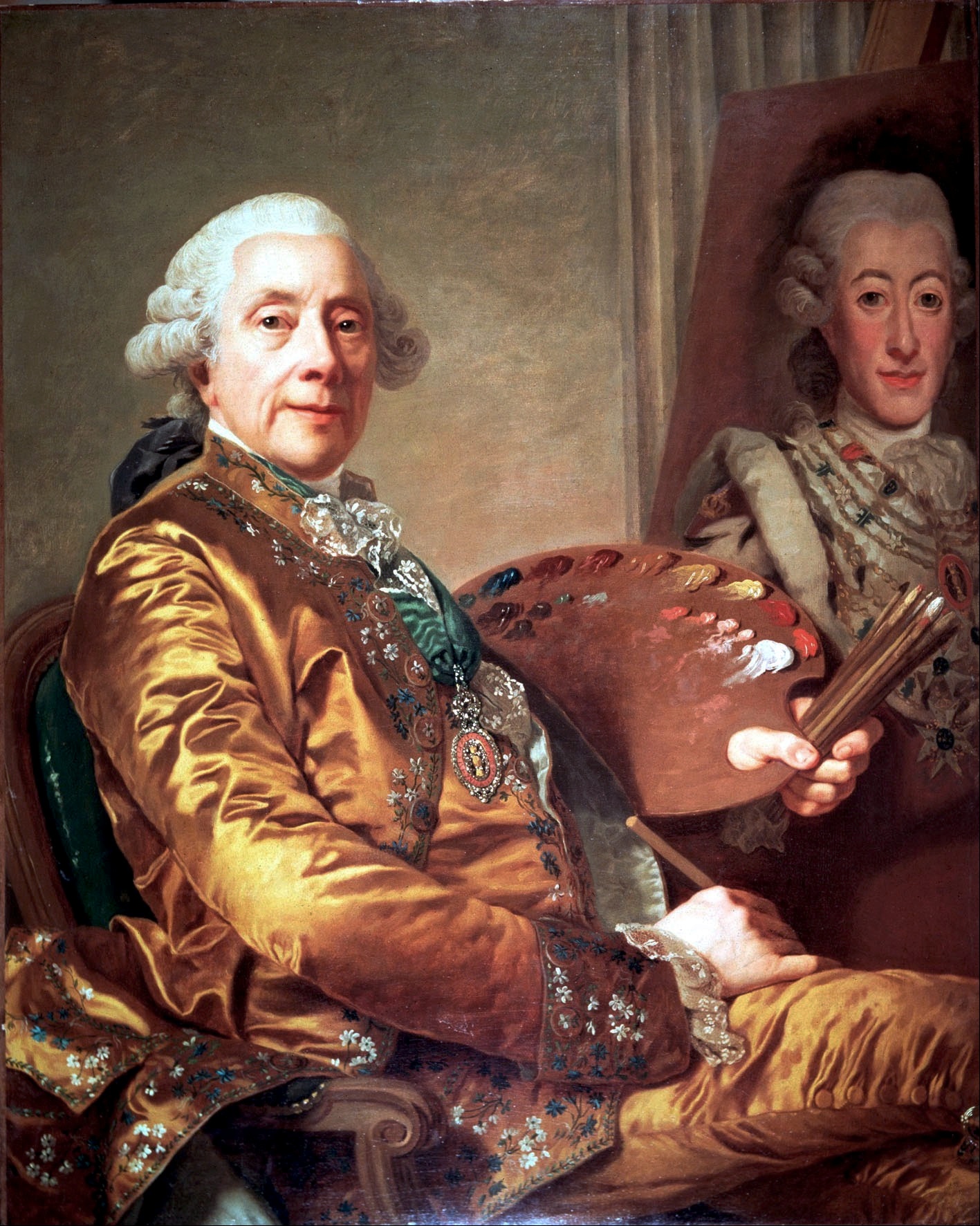
- Self Portrait while Painting the King of Sweden (1785)
- Born: 15 July 1718; Malmö, Sweden
- Died: 5 July 1793 (aged 74); Paris, France
- Spouse: Marie-Suzanne Giroust (m. 1759)

Alexander Roslin (pronounced [alɛkˈsǎnːdɛr rʊsˈliːn]; spelled Alexandre in French, pronounced [alɛksɑ̃dʁ ʁɔslɛ̃]; 15 July 1718 – 5 July 1793) was a Swedish painter who worked in Scania, Bayreuth, Paris, Italy, Warsaw and St. Petersburg, primarily for members of aristocratic families. He combined insightful psychological portrayal with a skillful representation of fabrics and jewels.

His style combined Classicist tendencies with the lustrous, shimmering colours of Rococo, a jocular, elegant and ornate style. He lived in France from 1752 until 1793, a period that spanned most of his career. The painting by Roslin depicting Jeanne Sophie de Vignerot du Plessis, Countess of Egmont Pignatelli, was bought by the Minneapolis Institute of Art in 2006 for US$3 million. Roslin also has pieces displayed at the Metropolitan Museum of Art.

== Life ==
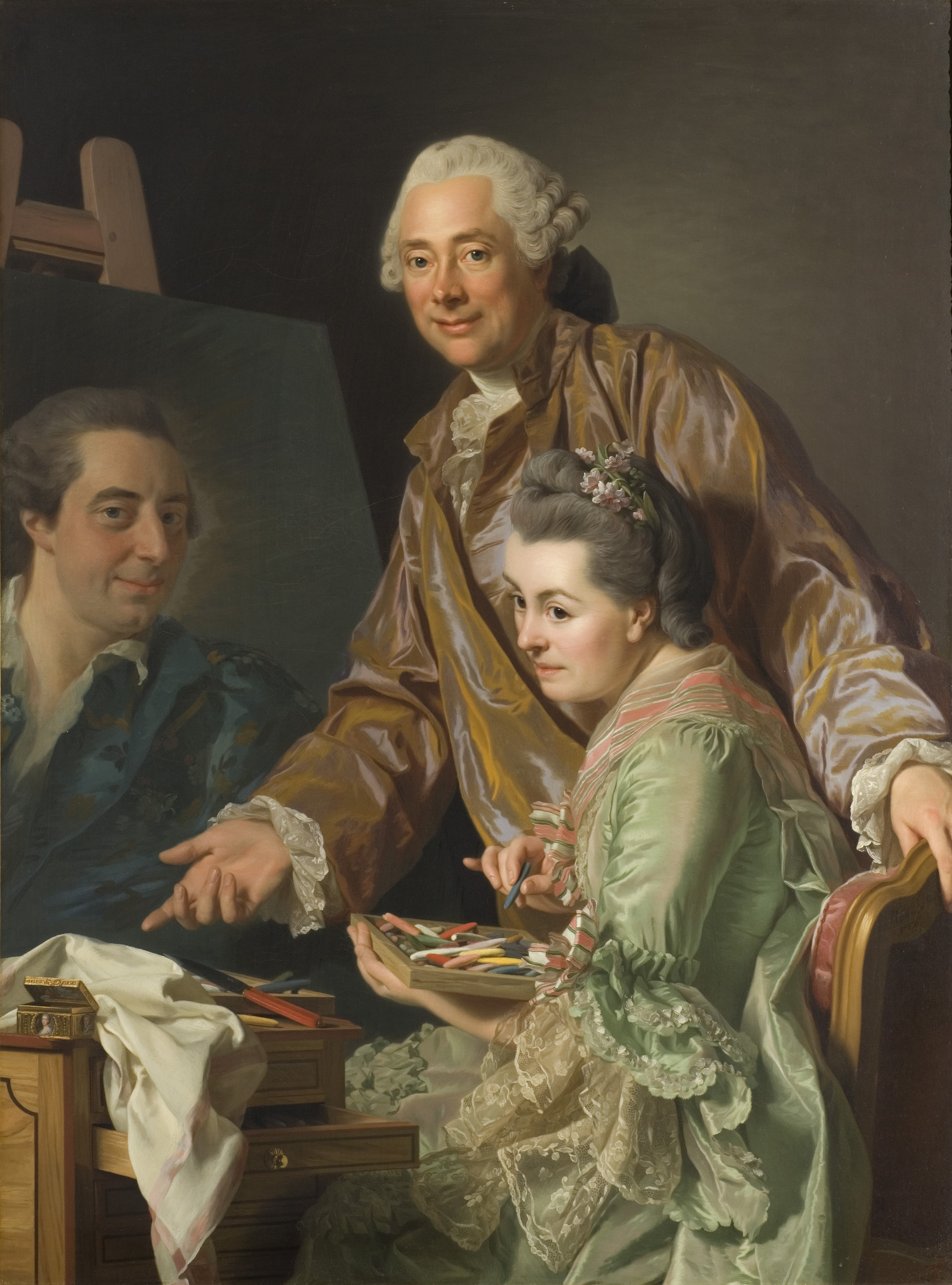
Double portrait of Roslin and his wife, 1767

Alexander Roslin was born on 15 July 1718, in Malmö, Sweden, the son of naval physician Hans Roslin and Catherine Wertmüller. After showing an unusual talent for drawing and painting, he trained in drawing at Karlskrona under Admiralty Captain Lars Ehrenbill (1697–1747) in order to become a naval draughtsman, and then began to paint miniatures. Stockholm had become an intellectual and artistic center since Queen Christina had established connections with Paris, and Alexander Roslin moved there. At the age of sixteen he became apprenticed to the court painter Georg Engelhard Schröder in Stockholm, studying painting there until 1741 and beginning to paint large portraits in oils. Schröder was influenced by Hyacinthe Rigaud and Nicolas de Largillière. In 1741, Roslin settled in Gothenburg, and the following year moved to Scania, where he remained until 1745 painting portraits and also creating religious paintings for the church at Hasslöv.

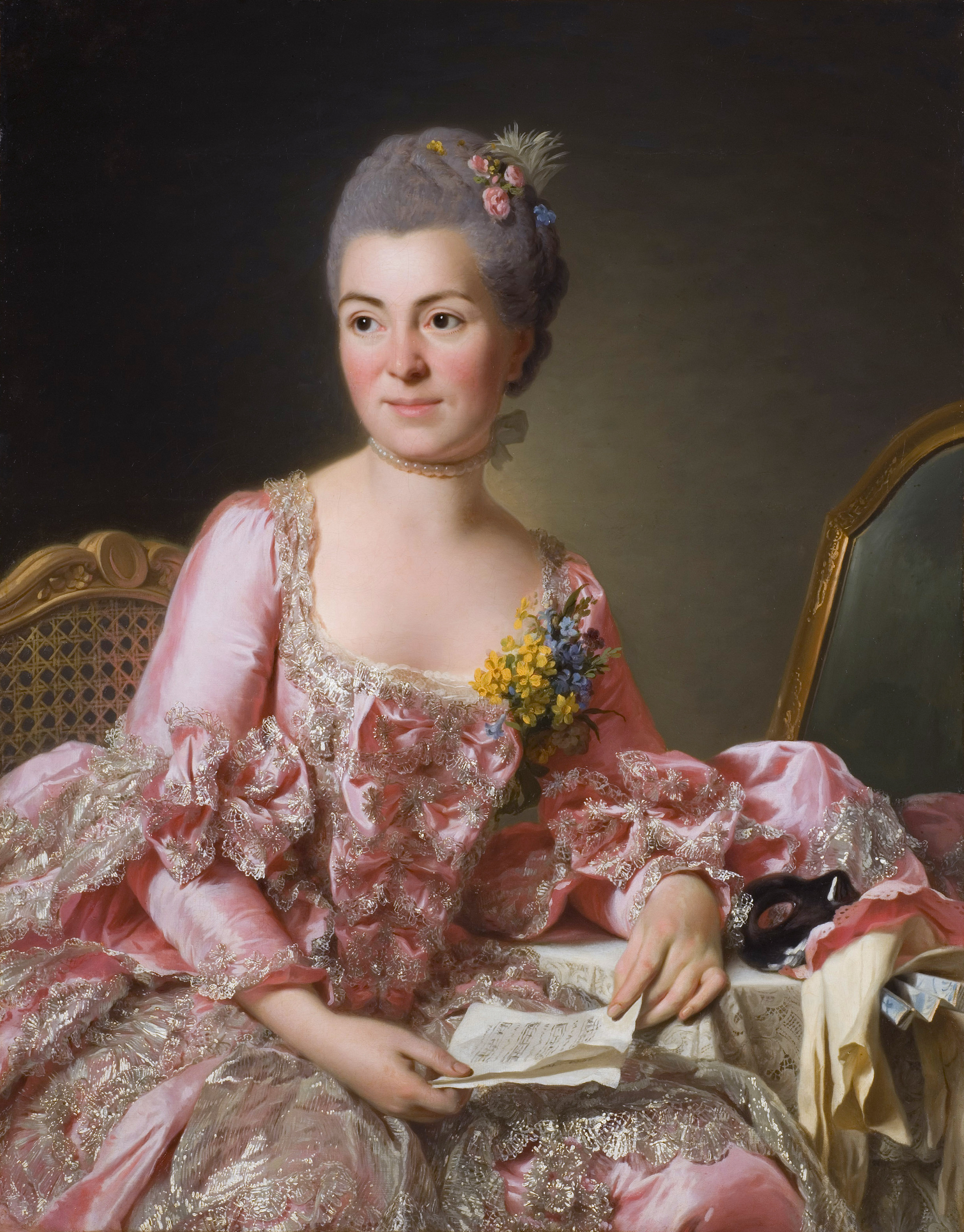
A portrait of Roslin's wife, Marie Suzanne Giroust-Roslin, 1770

In 1745, Roslin left Sweden for Bayreuth, where he had been invited to work for Frederick, Margrave of Brandenburg-Kulmbach. In 1747, he moved to Italy to study the works of the great masters. While in Italy he portrayed, among others, the family of Philip, Duke of Parma in 1752. In the same year Roslin moved to Paris, at the age of 34, where he settled for the rest of his life. Here, in 1759, he married the pastel painter Marie-Suzanne Giroust (1734–1772). The couple had three sons and three daughters. In 1768 Roslin painted her dressed in Bolognese fashion, The Lady with the Veil, a portrait that the art critic, writer and philosopher Denis Diderot judged "très piquante". In 1767 he painted a double portrait of them both; she is depicted working in pastels on a portrait of Henrik Wilhelm Peill, while Roslin points at a gold box he received from Peill as a present. The frame of the painting is inscribed Loin et près (Far away and yet close), showing that the portrait was a token of friendship. This painting was purchased by the Swedish National Museum in 2013.

== Career ==
In Paris he was a protégé of François Boucher and his work rapidly became fashionable. He was chosen as a member of the French Art Academy, to which his wife also belonged. His early portraits are painted in bright, cool colours, and show the influence of Jean-Marc Nattier and Hyacinthe Rigaud. Around the 1760s he started using daring colouring in his paintings, such as in the portrait of his wife, The Lady with the Veil (1768), and the Jennings Family (1769).

Roslin had great technical skill in painting the surfaces and texture of precious materials such as fabrics and jewels, but was also adept at capturing his sitters at their best. In Paris he soon became one of the foremost portraitists of his time, valued mostly for practiced rendering of luxurious fabrics and gentle complexions: "Satin, skin? Go to Roslin." His portraits of members of the French aristocracy show sensitivity and taste and also psychological insight, although changes in taste might make his faces seem "stiff and lifeless" to some observers today. In 1765 he scored a significant triumph when his portrait of Louis, Duke of La Rochefoucauld and his family, painted in competition with Jean-Baptiste Greuze, was awarded the prize. He also painted several portraits of members of the French royal family and foreign princes, including the Swedish king Gustav III and his brothers. In the second half of the 18th century, having one's portrait painted by Roslin was the highpoint of public esteem. In 1771 Roslin, although a foreigner (often called Roslin le suédois, "Roslin the Swede"), was awarded a pension and a free apartment in the Louvre. The following year he was awarded the Royal Order of Vasa by his native country, after which he was also called Roslin le Chevalier ("Roslin the knight").

He was often surrounded by Swedish visitors to Paris, such as Peill. He was also a good friend of the influential Swedish politician Count Carl Gustaf Tessin. After his wife's death, during the years 1774–75, Roslin visited Sweden, where he had been elected a member of the Royal Swedish Academy of Arts, oddly enough as a foreign honorary member. During the visit, he painted the members of the Swedish royal family, his self-portrait while painting the king, and also portraits of the statesman Carl Fredrik Scheffer and the naturalist Carl Linnaeus.

On his way back to Paris he visited St. Petersburg, where he painted several portraits of Empress Catherine II of Russia and some notable portraits of Russian aristocrats between 1775 and 1777. Catherine tried to persuade him to stay in her service, but Roslin declined and returned to France. He died in Paris on 5 July 1793 of natural causes after surviving the French Revolution and outliving many of his patrons; at that time he was the wealthiest artist in Paris.

Early works

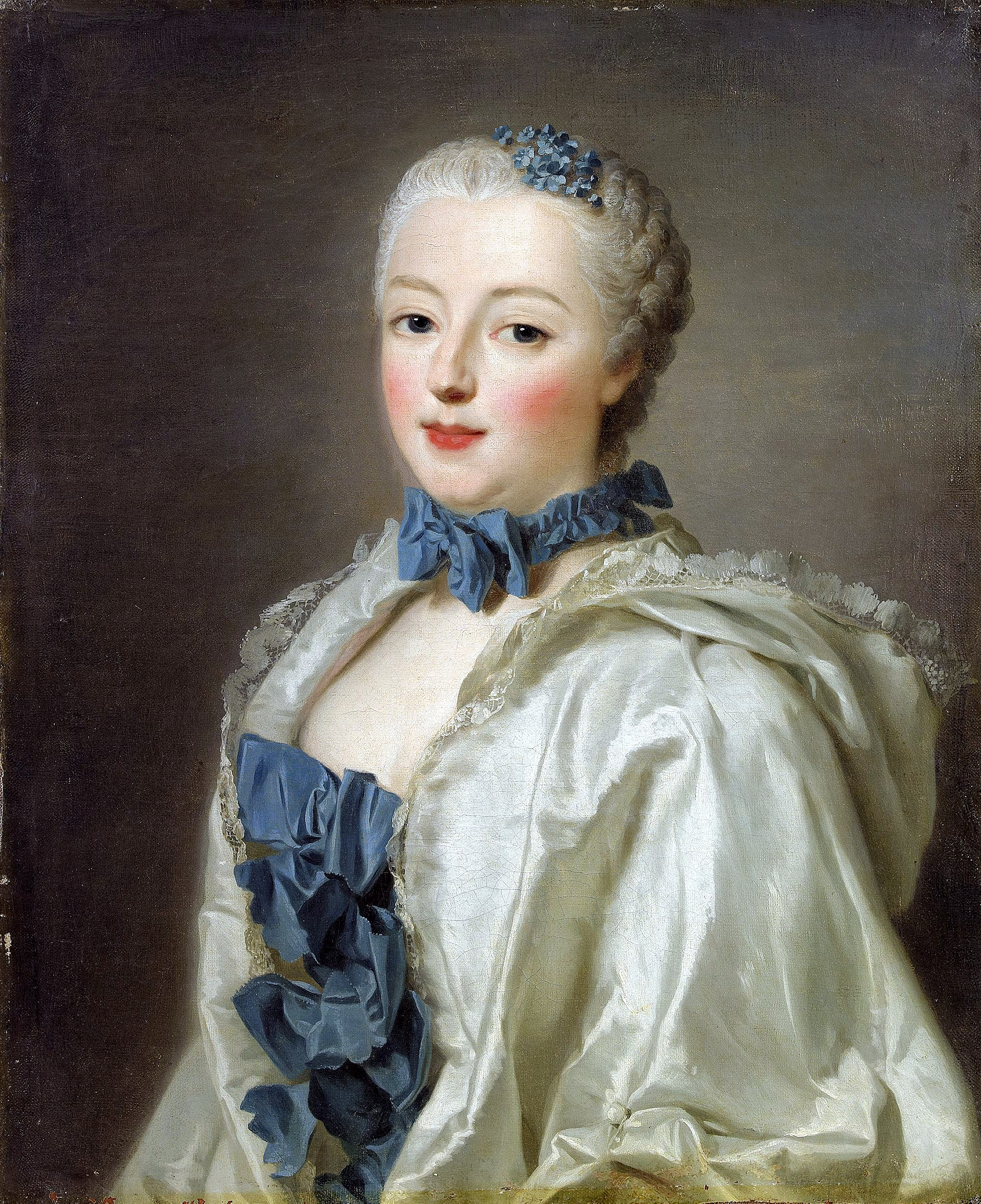
Countess Françoise Marguerite de Grignan the daughter of Madame de Sévigné, 1753

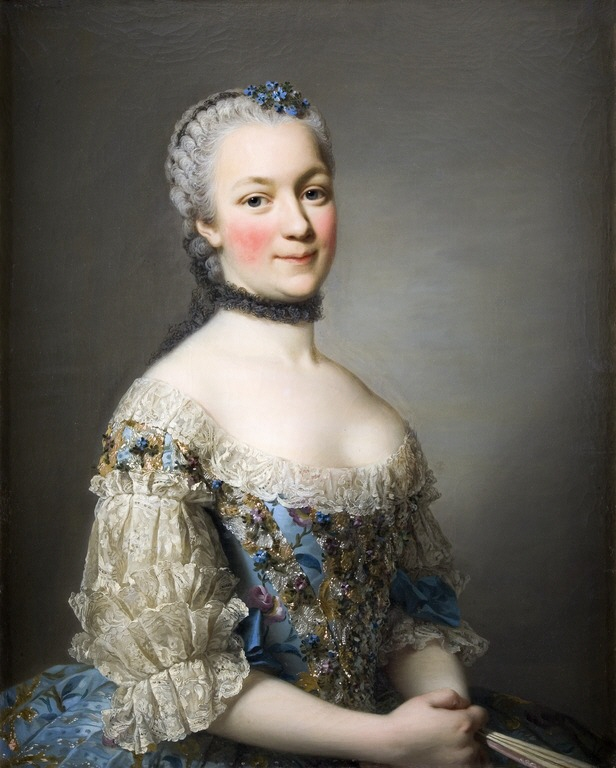
Katarzyna Mniszech, 1752

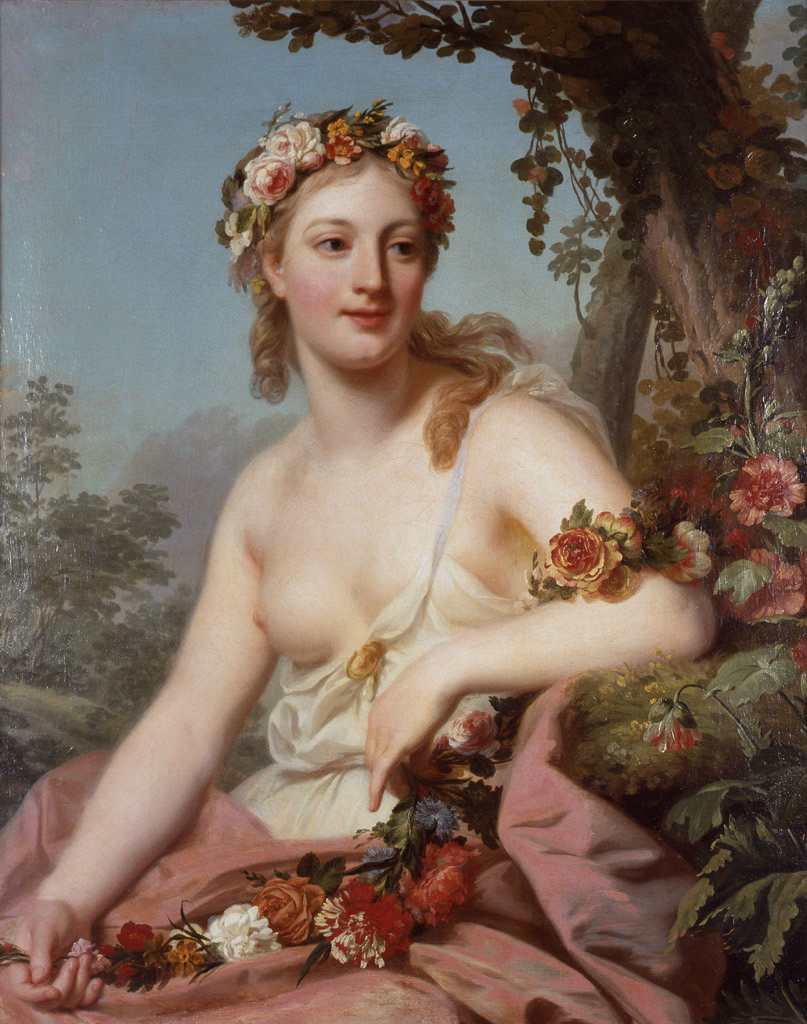
Flora or Hebe

== Works ==
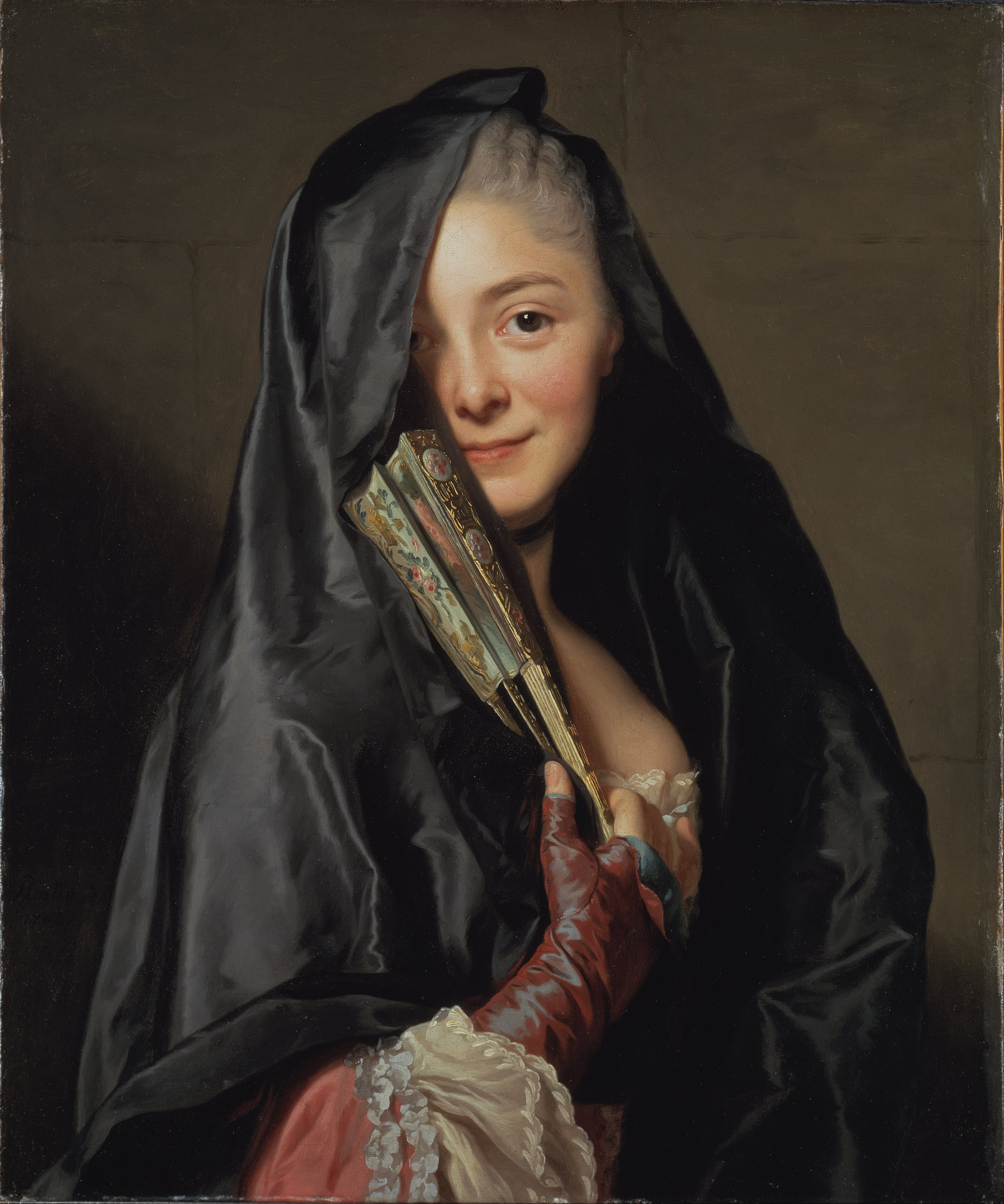
The Lady with the Veil (The Artist's Wife), 1768, dressed "à la Bolognaise"

Stylistically, his paintings are Classicist in some respects, but primarily Rococo. The vast majority show members of the European nobility and of leading political and cultural circles. Roslin was enormously successful among members of French high society, becoming one of the wealthiest artists of the era in France. He signed his works Roslin Suédois. As a member of the Académie royale de peinture et de sculpture Roslin exhibited his paintings at the Salon de Paris, the official exhibition of members' work. Founded in 1725 the Salon became, between 1748 and 1890, the greatest biannual art event in the Western world. From 1753 Roslin exhibited 18 times at the Salon.

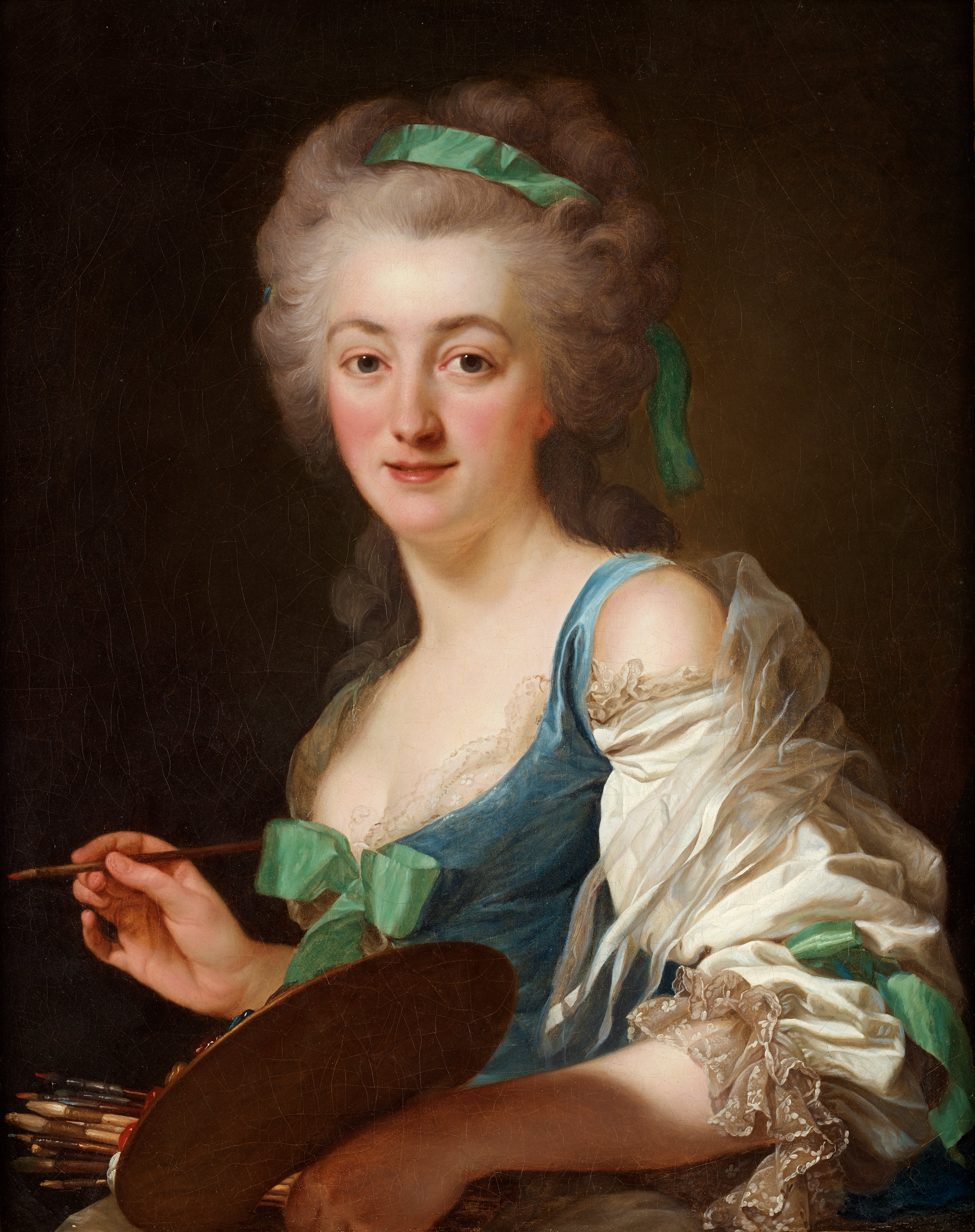
Anne Vallayer-Coster, French painter, 1783

Roslin's popularity with both his foreign and his Swedish audiences during his lifetime is undisputed. He was one of the foremost portrait painters of his time, widely known for his masterful ability to reproduce his sitters' fashionable garments with their silks, lace, pearls and gold filaments. Roslin's ability to capture the personality of the people he depicted made him popular with his clients and allows us, even today a few hundred years later, to still feel close to the people he painted. He flattered and beautified his subjects according to the Rococo ideal. He painted a number of portraits of Russian Imperial statesmen, including images of Ivan Betskoi and his sister Anastasia Ivanovna, and of Ivan Shuvalov. He also painted some notable portraits of Polish and French aristocratic ladies.

Roslin's portrait of Anne Vallayer-Coster is praised particularly and became much debated after the Salon. In Le Véridique au Salon, published in 1783, it was described as one that "belonged to the artist's best". The picture has been compared to the contemporary artist Elisabeth Vigée-Lebrun's celebrated self-portrait. Roslin depicted his model in a cool colour scale; in green, white, and blue, with the artist's attributes of palette and brushes, a common way for artists to depict themselves. Because of this, Roslin's painting was sometimes misinterpreted by art historians as a self-portrait by Vallayer-Coster.

== Gallery ==
Paintings

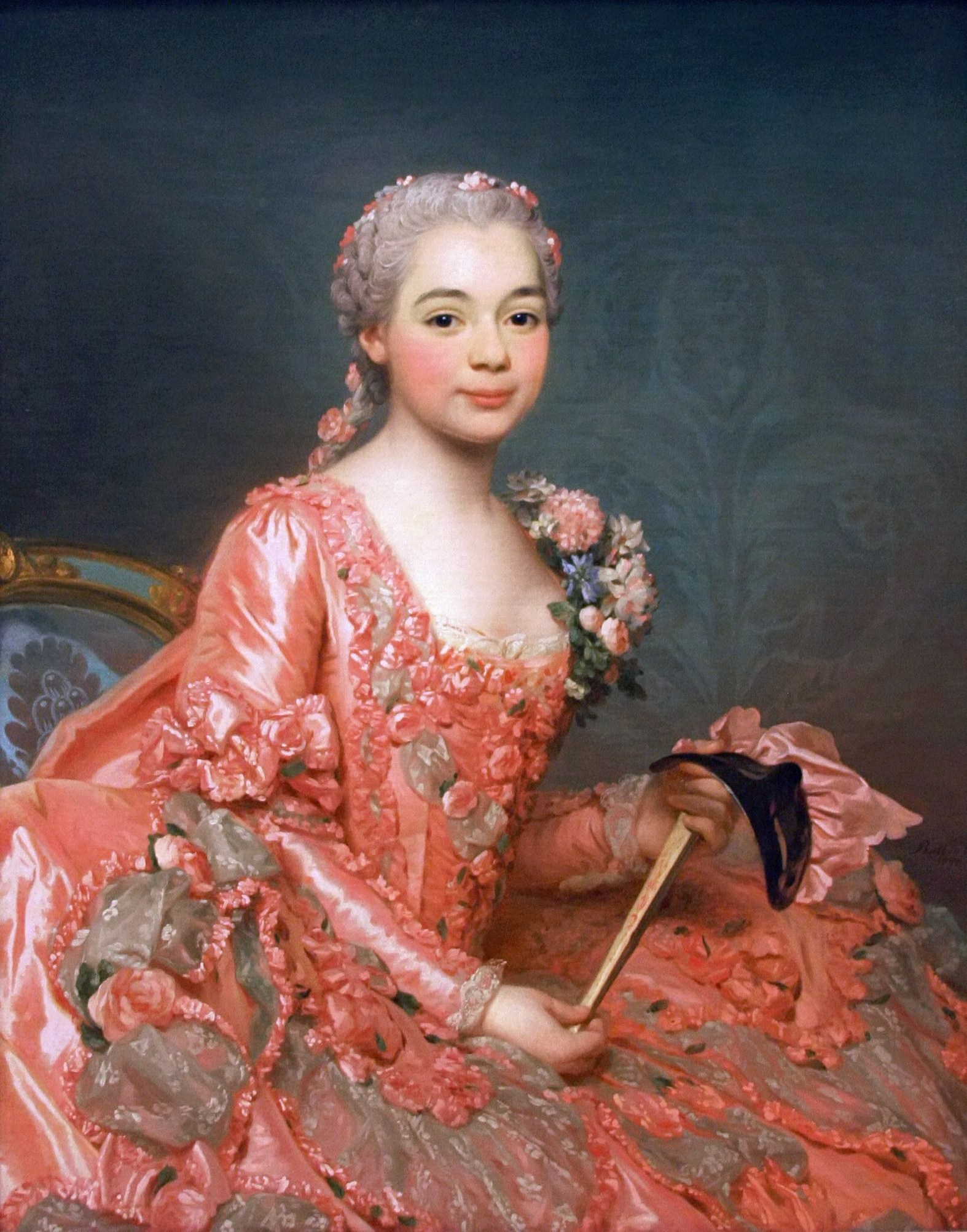
Baroness de Neubourg-Cromière (1756)

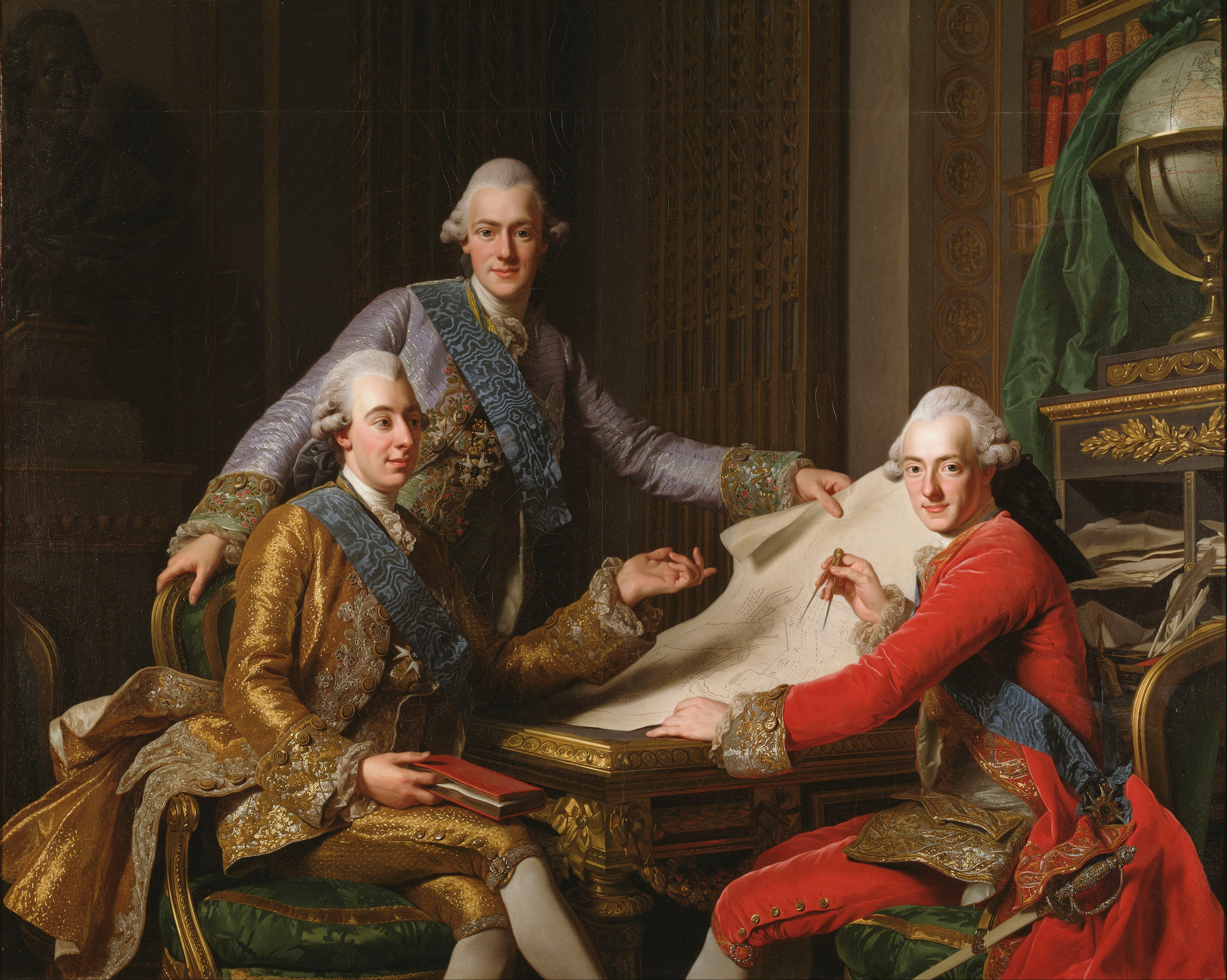
King Gustav III of Sweden and his Brothers (1771)

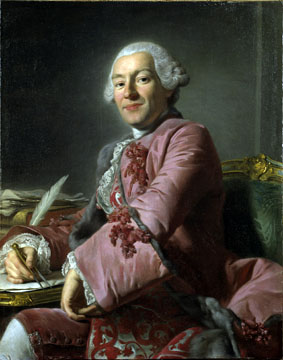
Carl Fredrik Adelcrantz, Swedish architect (1754)

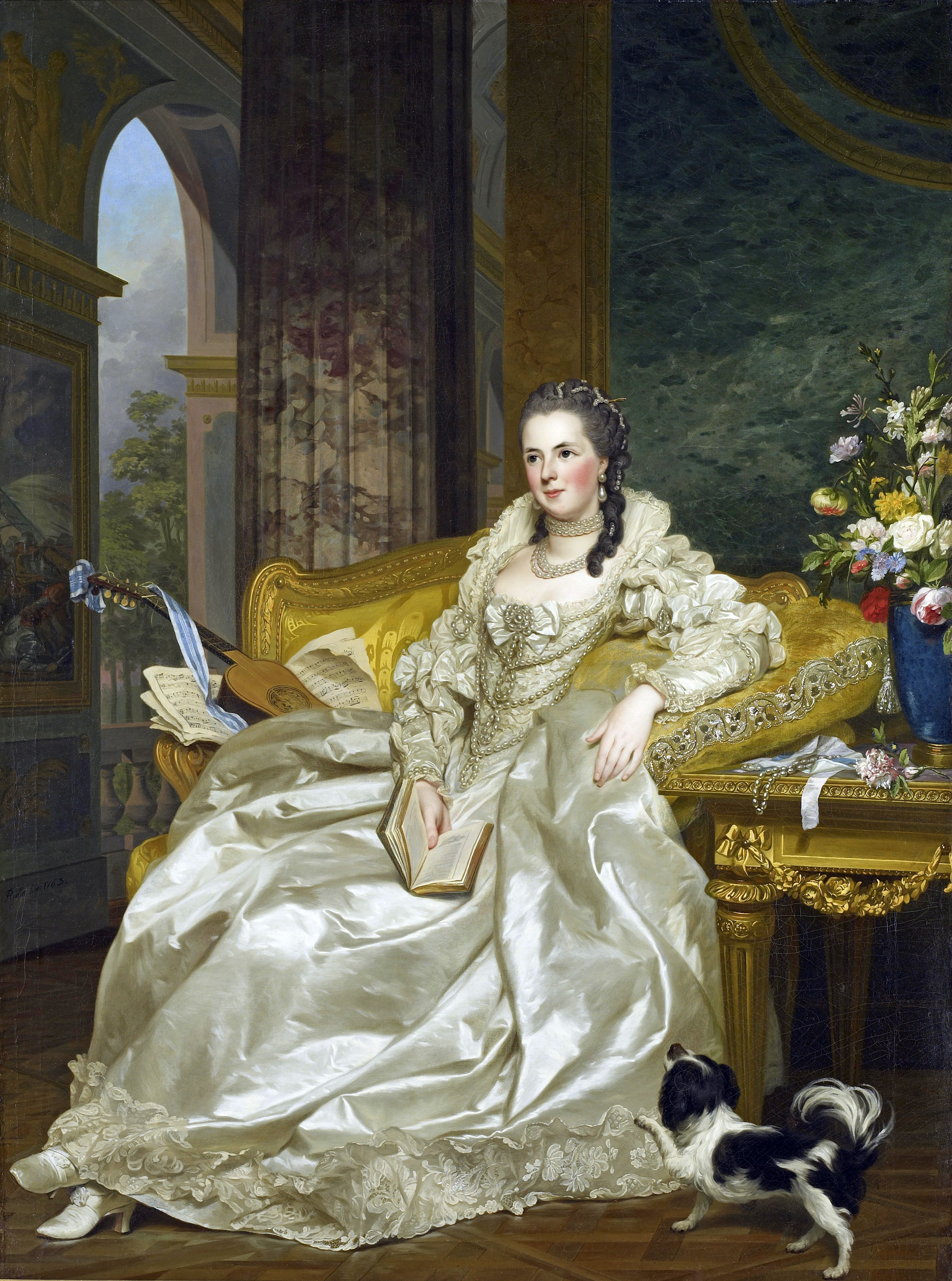
Jeanne Sophie de Vignerot du Plessis, Countess of Egmont Pignatelli (1763)

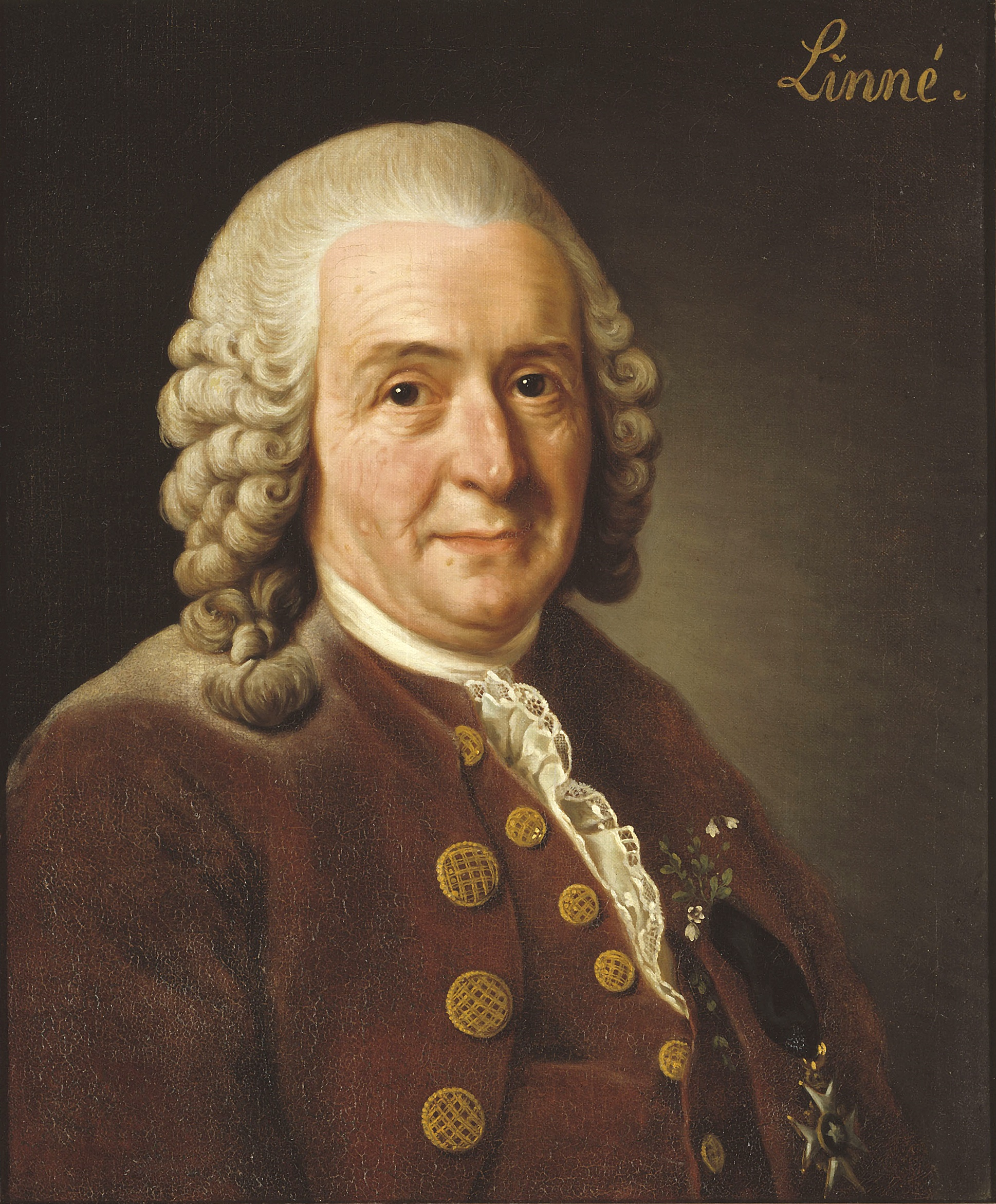
Swedish botanist and originator of binomial nomenclature, Carl Linnaeus (1775)

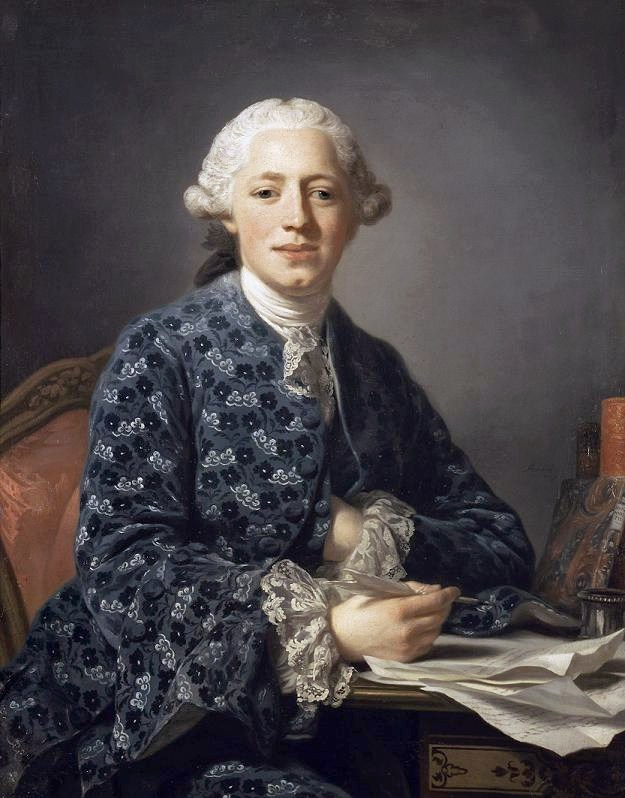
Baron Thure Leonard Klinckowström (1758)

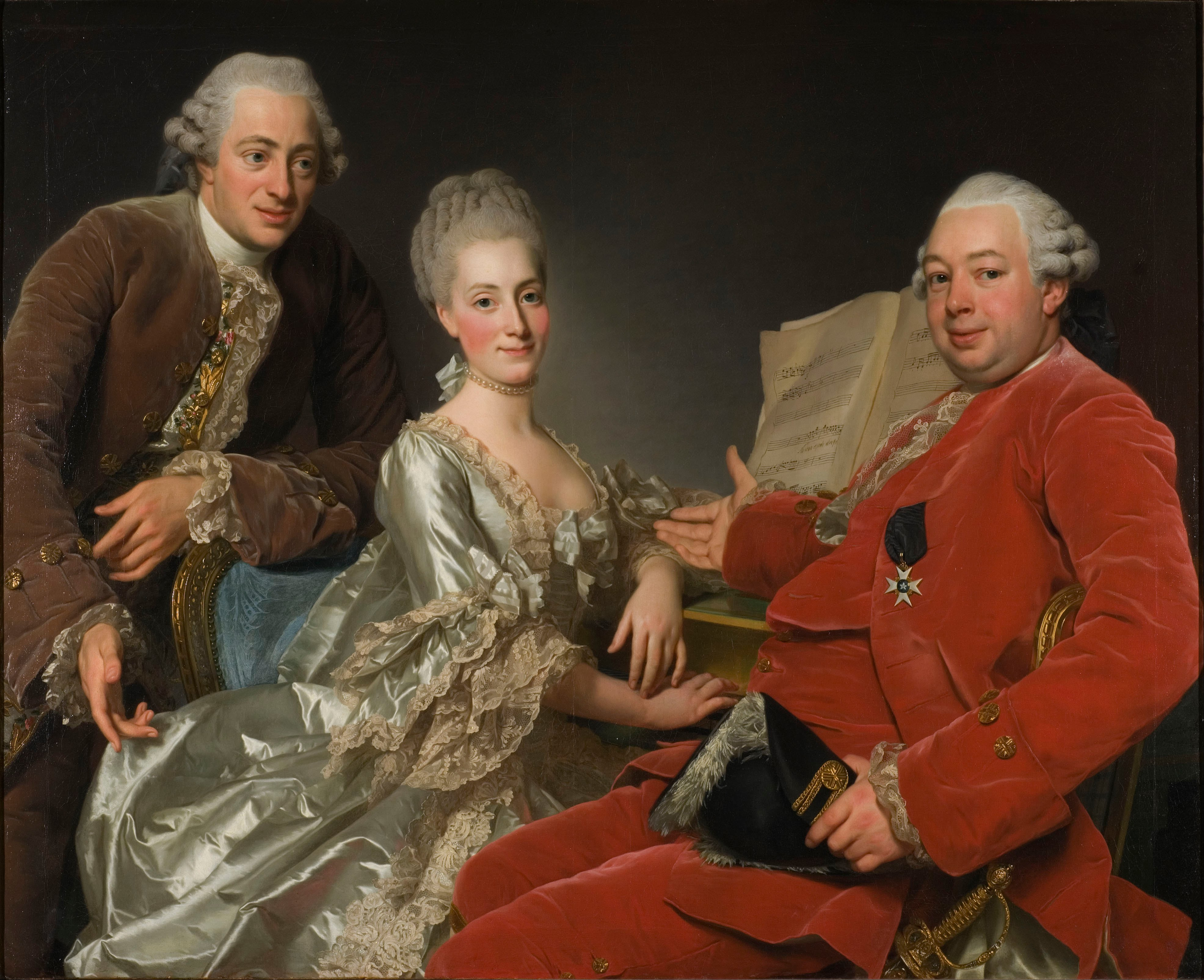
John Jennings, His Brother and Sister-in-Law (1769)

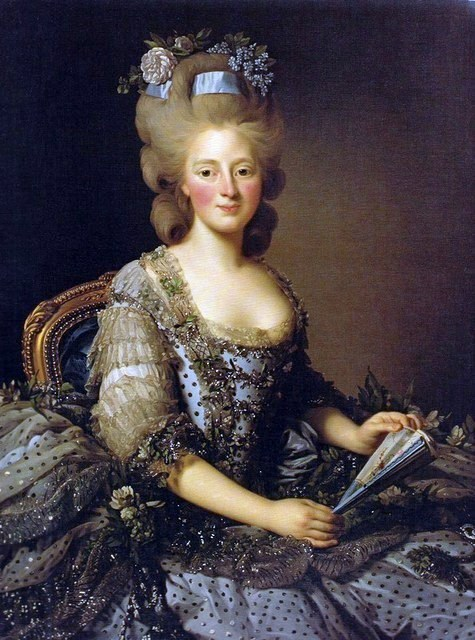
Archduchess Maria Amalia of Austria (later Maria Amalia, Duchess of Parma)

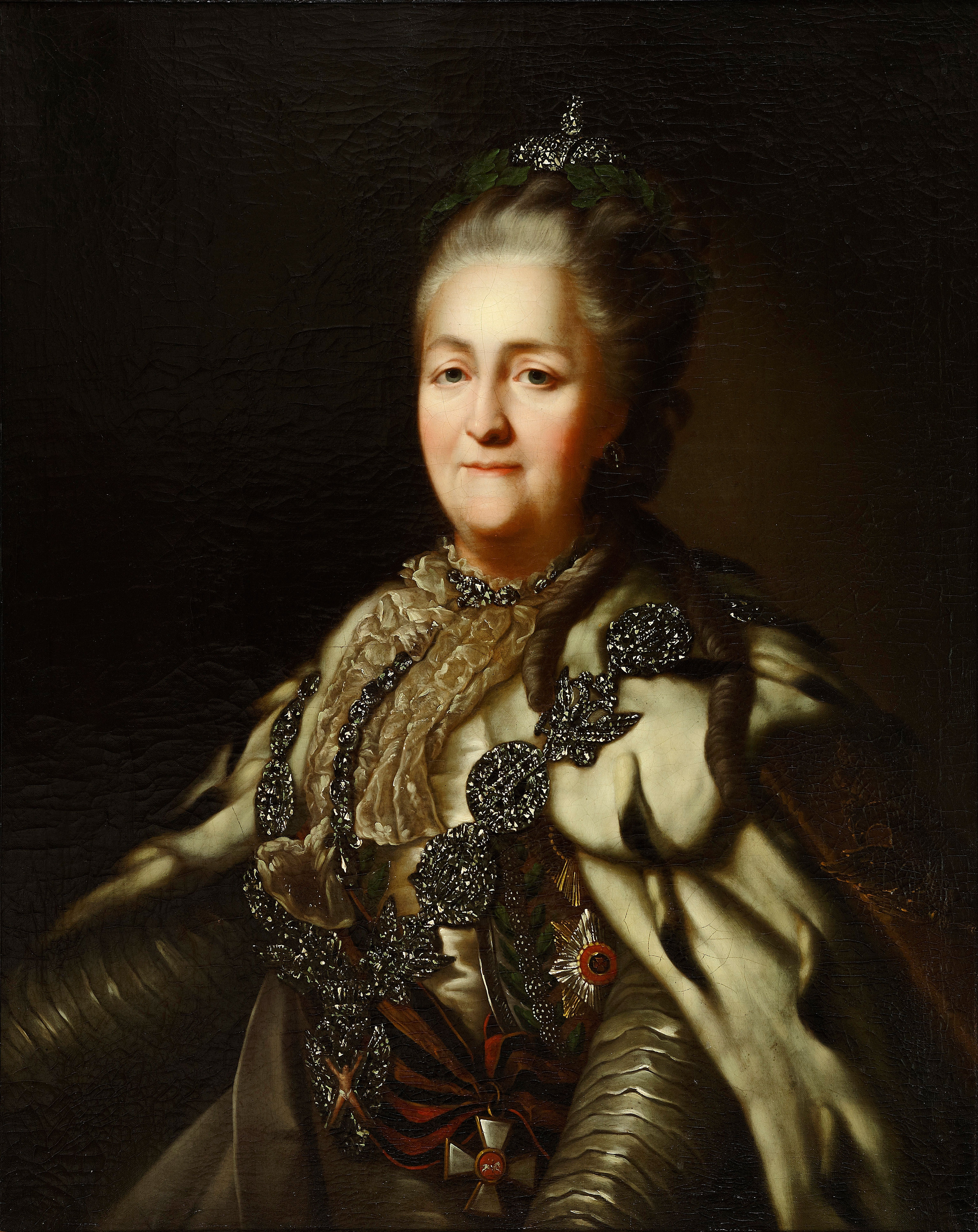
Empress Catherine the Great of Russia (1780s)

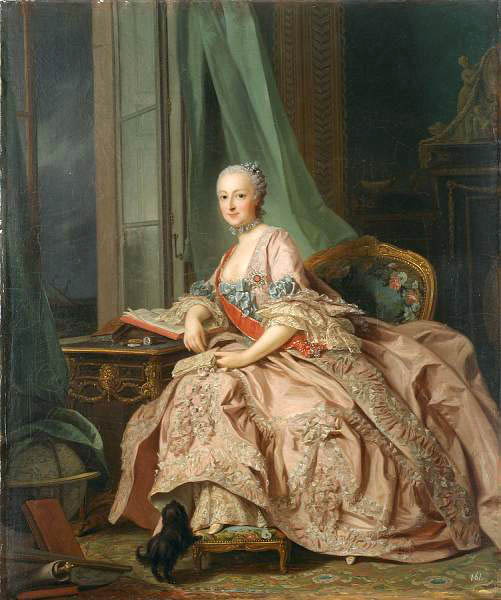
Anastasia Ivanovna, Hereditary Princess of Hesse-Homburg, Princess Trubetskaya

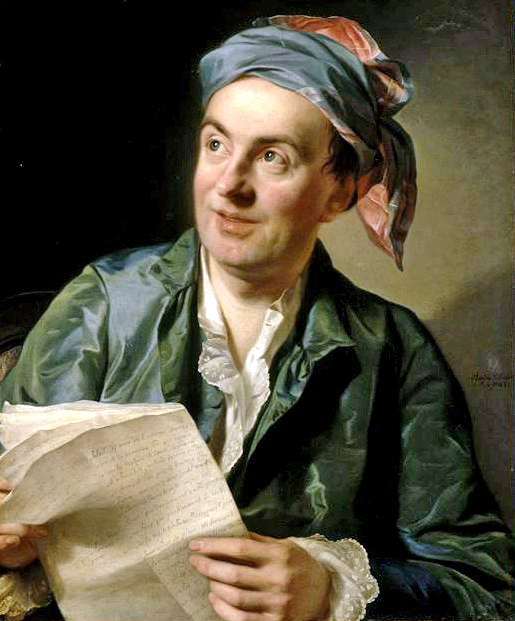
Jean-François Marmontel, French historian and writer (1767)

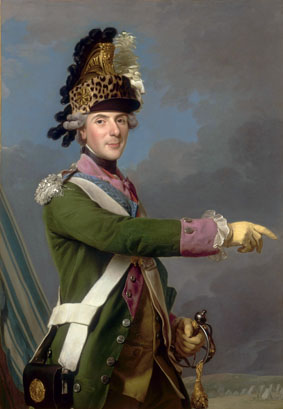
Louis de France, the Dauphin of France, the heir to the throne of France (1765)

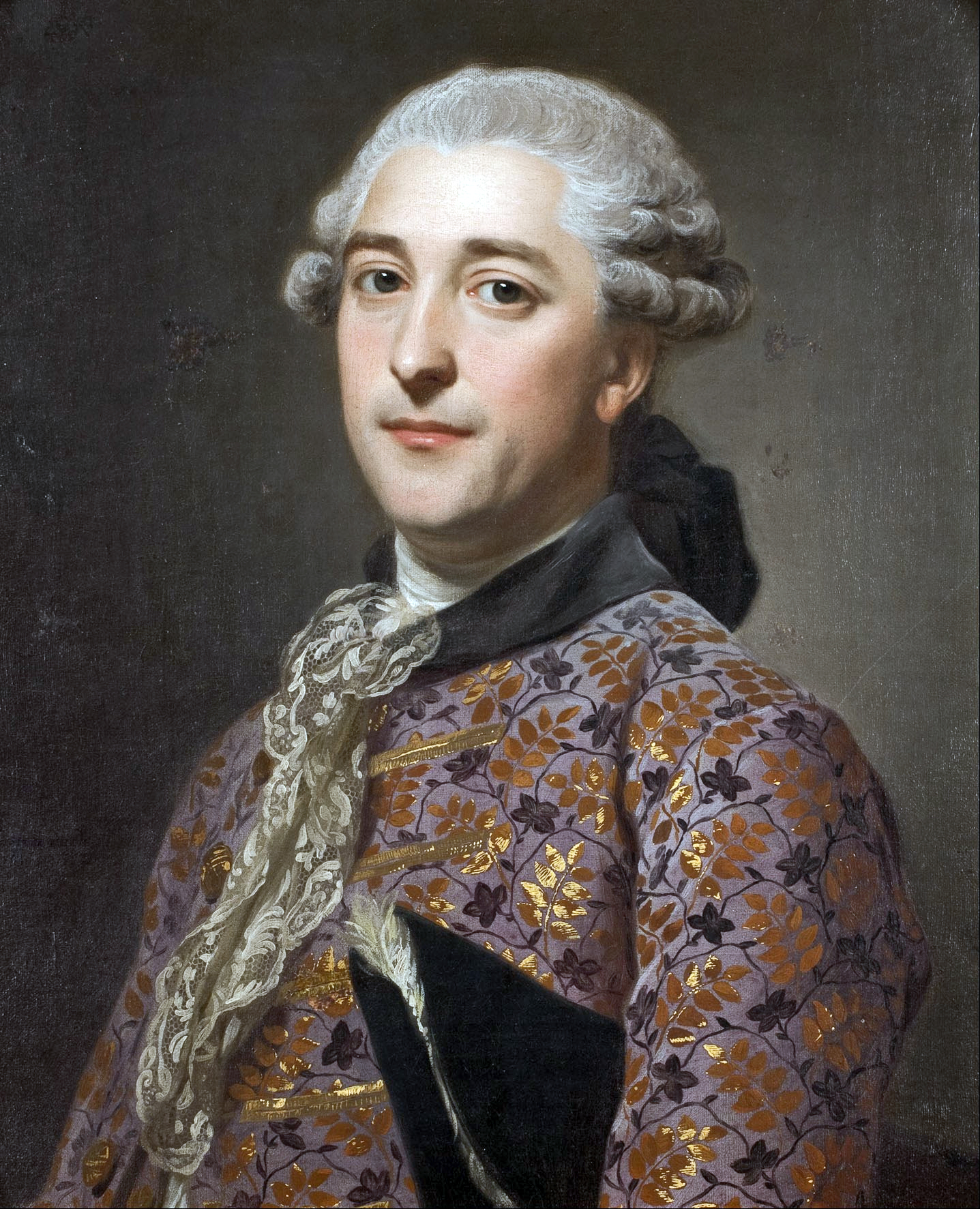
Prince Vladimir Borisovich Golitsyn (1762)

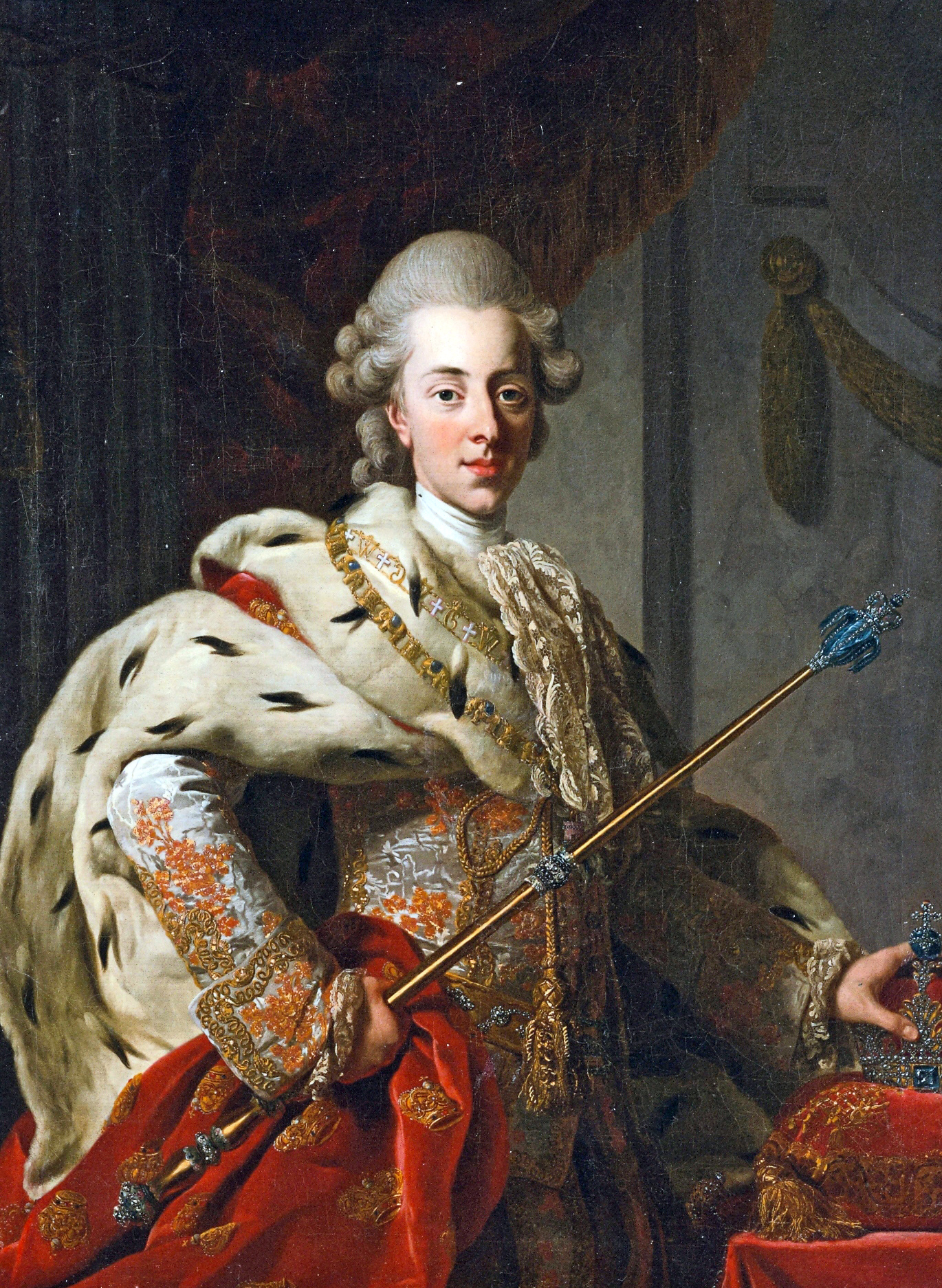
King Christian VII of Denmark (1772)

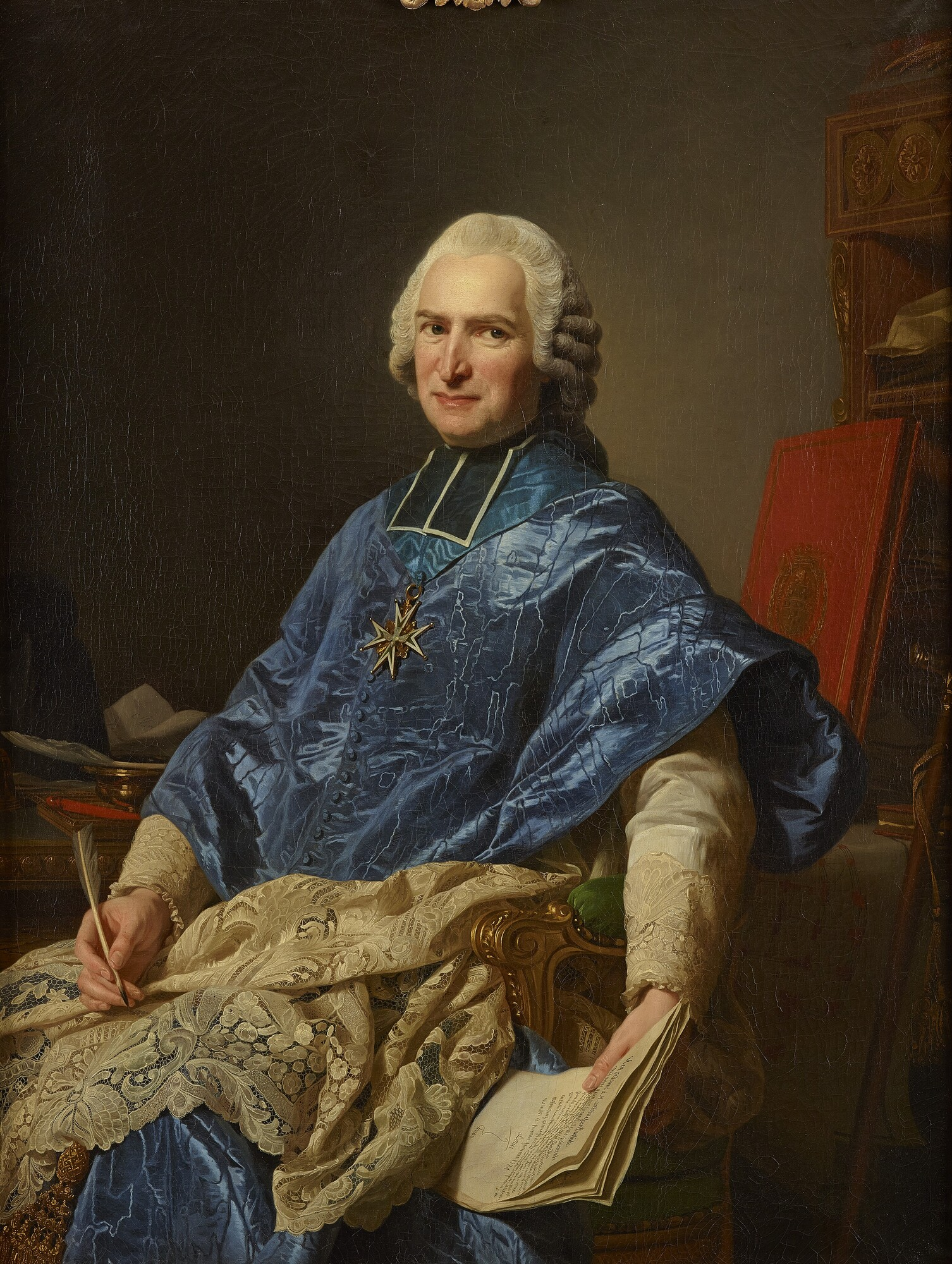
Portrait of Joseph Marie Terray (1774)

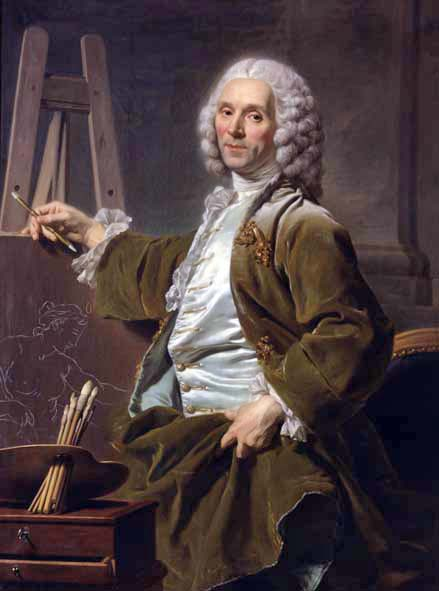
Hyacinthe Collin de Vermont, French painter

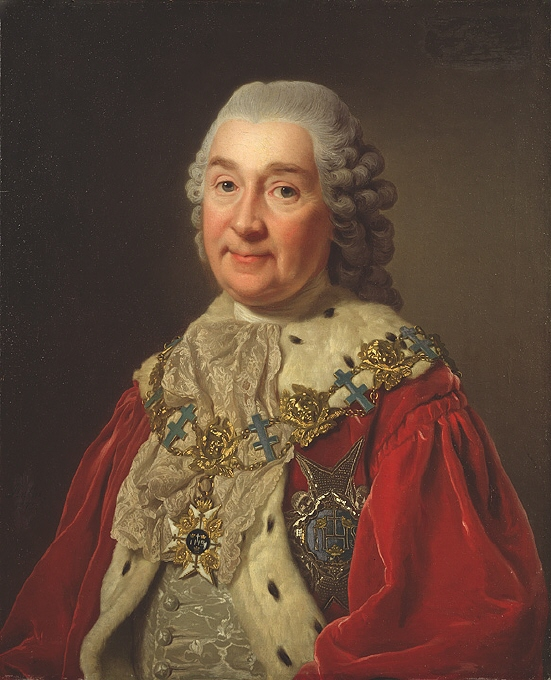
Carl Fredrik Scheffer, Swedish riksråd (privy councilor)

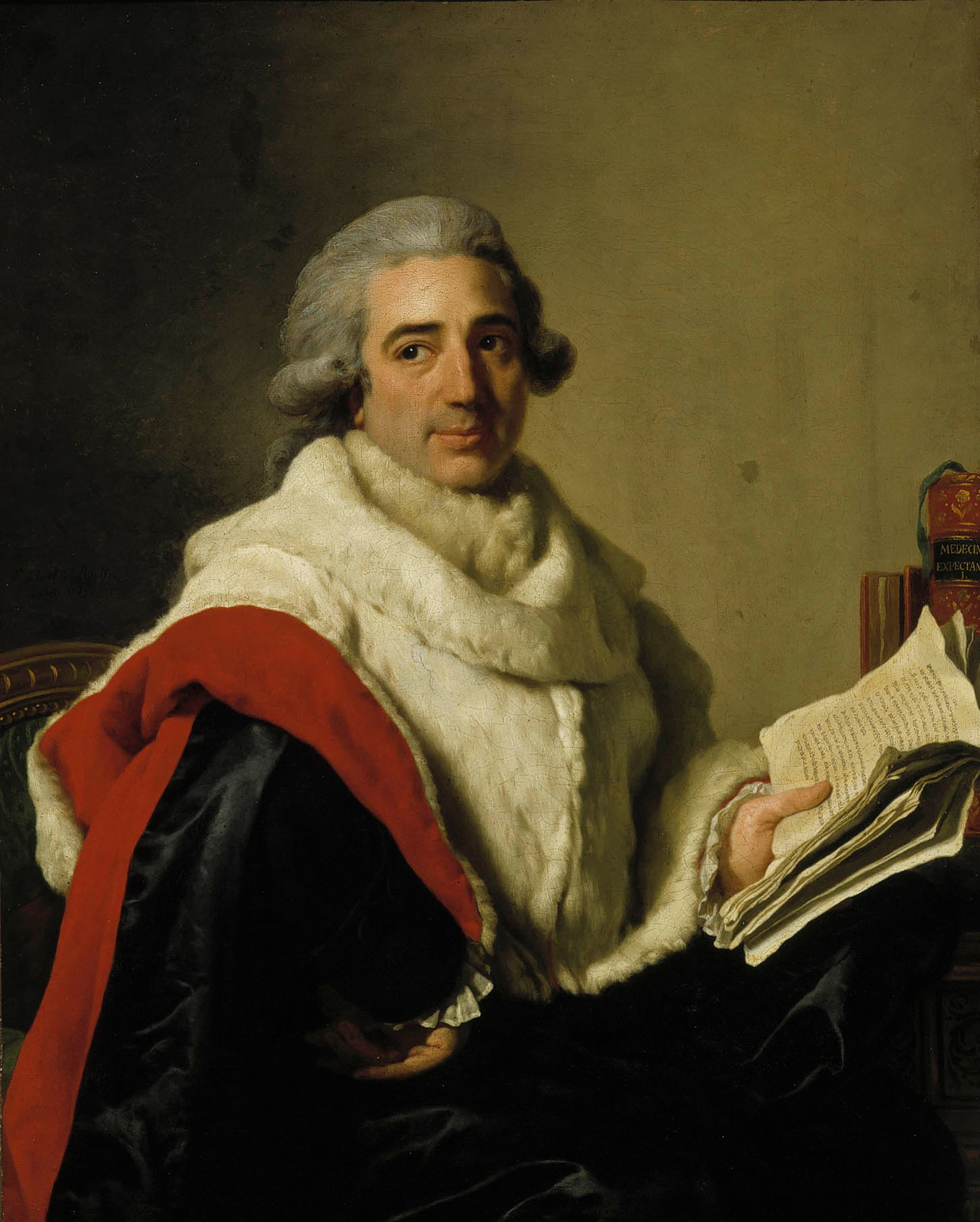
Jean-Baptiste Eugénie Du Mangin or Jean-Baptiste Dumangin France (1789)

== See also ==
- List of Swedish artists
