= Pierre Lassus =

French surgeon (1741–1807)

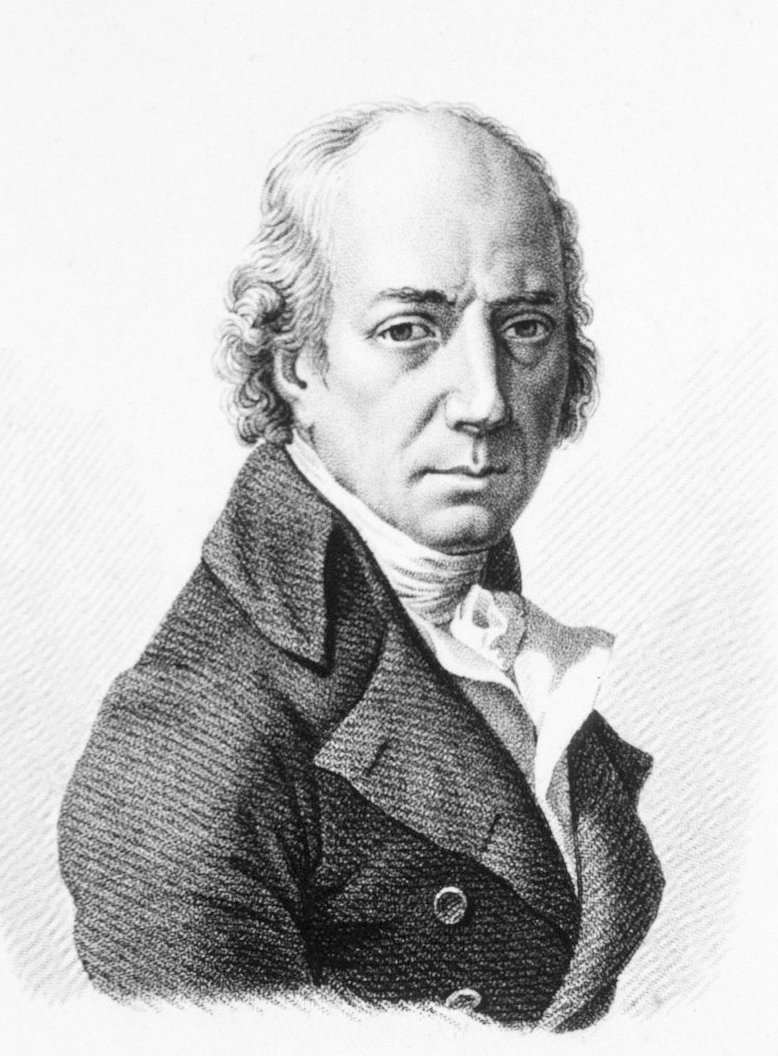
- Pierre Lassus
- Born: 11 April 1741
- Died: 16 March 1807 (aged 65)
- Occupation: surgeon
- Known for: surgeon to the daughters of Louis XV
- Medical career
- Institutions: Institut de France

Pierre Lassus (11 April 1741 – 16 March 1807) was a French surgeon born in Paris.

He was a one-time surgeon to the daughters of Louis XV, and in 1795 worked with Philippe-Jean Pelletan (1747–1829), Nicolas Dieudonné Jeanroy (1750–1816) and Jean-Baptiste Dumangin (1744–1826) on the autopsy of 10-year-old Louis XVII.

In 1802 he was appointed secrétaire perpétuel of the physical sciences section at the Institut de France. In 1804 he was chosen by Jean-Nicolas Corvisart (1755–1821) as a consultant-surgeon of the Emperor.

== Written works ==
- Nouvelle méthode de traiter les fractures et les luxations (1771)
- Mémoires sur les plaies du sinus longitudinal supérieur de la dure-mère, (1774)
- Essai ou discours historique et critique sur les de´couvertes faites en anatomie par les anciens & par les modernes (1783)
- Éphémérides pour servir à l'histoire de toutes les parties de l'art de guérir, with Philippe-Jean Pelletan. (1790)
- Traité élémentaire de la médecine opératoire, Paris, (1795)
- Pathologie chirurgicale (1806).
