= Modeste Gruau =

Modeste Gruau (25 March 1795 - 28 January 1883) was a lawyer and author. He is known for support of Karl Wilhelm Naundorff, a Prussian watchmaker who claimed to be the real Louis XVII.

== Biography ==
Gruau was born in La Chartre-sur-le-Loir.

Gruau was a French attorney who, on 22 December 1824, was appointed prosecutor in Mayenne.

Gruau became the main proponent of Karl Wilhelm Naundorff, who claimed to be Louis XVII. In October 1838, Gruau was appointed coadjutor of the Catholic-Evangelical Church, a sect founded by Naundorff. Naundorff named Gruau "Count of La Barre" .

Between March 1839 and April 1840, Graua wrote for the periodical "The Voice of an Outlaw".

In 1845, Gruau followed Naundorff into exile in the Netherlands. After Naundorff's death in 1845, Gruau continued to support Naundorff's heirs in their claim.

== Gruau as purported teenage author ==
The 1809 work The First Book of Napoleon by "Eliakim the Scribe" is tentatively attributed to Gruau, though Gruau would have been about fourteen years old in 1809. Eliakim is the name of multiple figures in the King James Bible. Nearly 50 years after the publication of The First Book of Napoleon, Grau published works under the pen name of "Eliakim". It remains uncertain whether Modeste Grau authored The First Book of Napoleon in his early teens or whether Grau's pen name "Eliakim" (1854) was conflated with a similar pen name of a separate author who wrote under the name "Eliakim the Scribe" (1809).

== Bibliography ==
- (With Xavier Laprade) Reasons for belief in the existence of the Duke of Normandy, Paris, and Goullé Montmaur, 1836.
- (Presented as an autobiography of Louis XVII) Abstract History misfortunes of the Dauphin, from the time he was removed from the Temple, London, 1836. (Translated by CG Perceval in 1838).
- (With A. Gozzoli, Xavier Morel Laprade and Saint-Didier), The Voice of an outlaw, Paris, 1839-1840.
- Submission by Mr Gruau La Barre in support of the libel suit brought against the manager in charge of the newspaper "Le Capitole" (article 29 March 1839), Paris, Delacombe, 1840.
- The French government, offers a newly invented instrument of war, Paris, Delacombe, 1841.
- Solomon the Wise, son of David, his rebirth on this earth and heavenly revelation, Paris, Charpentier, 1841. (Continued from Charles de Cosson, Revelations on the errors of the old testament; Up the Index).
- Plots revealed, or Louis XVII last legitimate king of France, 3 vols., Rotterdam, H. Nijgh, 1846-1848.
- In policy point of justice or judicial replica in the case of the heirs of the Duke of Normandy, Breda, 1851.
- (Under the pseudonym of Eliakim), Visions of Isaiah and the new earth, Rotterdam, 1854.
- No! Louis XVII did not die in the Temple refutation of the work of Mr. A. de Beauchesne, Brussels / Leipzig, Flatau, 1858.
- Truth to the Duke of Bordeaux, Breda Broese & Company, 1859.
- (Under the pseudonym of Eliakim), Primitive Gospel, Paris, 1860.
- (Under the pseudonym of Eliakim), Italians, politics and Rome, Amsterdam, 1860.
- Response to the Dutch reflection of M. de Dompierre Chaufepié, The Hague, Susan, 1869.
- Royal martyr of the nineteenth century, Paris, 1870.
- Rovers Bourbon, Paris, 1871.
