= Baron de Richemont =

Claimant to be Louis XVII of France

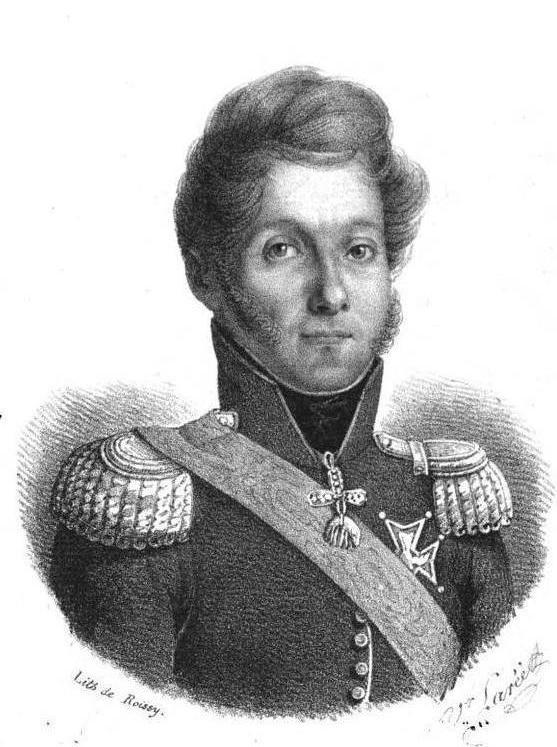
Richemont

The Baron de Richemont (c. 1785 – 10 August 1853) was a French imposter who claimed to be Louis XVII, the son of King Louis XVI and heir to the French throne, who died in prison during the French Revolution.

His real identity was uncertain, but he is generally identified by historians as Henri Hébert (born 1788) or possibly Claude Perrin (born 1786), the latter being a potential pseudonym.

Richemont was imprisoned in Milan from 1818 to 1825 after being arrested for traveling under a false identity. He first advanced his royal claims in Paris in 1828. In 1833, he was arrested; he was tried the following year, convicted, and sentenced to 12 years in prison. During his trial, a letter from Karl Wilhelm Naundorff, a rival claimant, was read in court, adding to the confusion. Richemont escaped his imprisonment after roughly one year and fled the country. He returned to France in 1840 and died at Gleizé on 10 August 1853. 'Louis-Charles de France' (Louis Charles of France; Louis XVII's full name was Louis Charles) was inscribed on his tomb, but the government ordered its removal in 1858.

== Background ==
=== The real Louis XVII and the False Dauphins ===
The real Louis XVII was born on 27 March 1785 in Versailles. He became Dauphin after the death of his older brother in 1789 and was considered to be the king of France by the Royalists after his father's execution on 21 January 1793, despite the fact that he never ruled.

Louis XVII, along with the rest of the royal family, was imprisoned in the Square du Temple prison following the Insurrection of 10 August 1792. Orphaned by his parents’ execution, he died in prison on 8 June 1795 at age 10, from a ‘scrofulous illness’ (tuberculous lymphadenitis), as found in contemporary documents and confirmed by an autopsy. The autopsy noted physical signs of neglect and isolation. Modern DNA testing done in 2000 on a preserved heart, long attributed to him, matched the maternal Bourbon lineage, supporting the theory that he died in custody.

The French monarchy was abolished on 21 September 1792, yet the Royalists regarded the boy as the legitimate heir, and his uncle, the Count of Provence, assumed the title King Louis XVIII during the Bourbon Restoration in 1814-1815 following the child's presumed death.

The rumours of Louis XVII's alleged survival emerged as early as 1795, assisted by vague prison records, his burial in a mass grave with no marker, and a romantic-era fixation on tales of royal escape and conspiracy. These rumors percolated during the tumult of the early 19th century and the Bourbon Restoration. Over the next few decades, over 100 imposters (known as the False Dauphins) claimed that Louis XVII was secretly removed from the Square du Temple and replaced with a substitute, and that they were the real Louis XVII. Amongst the more well-known were Jean-Marie Hervagault, Karl Wilhelm Naundorff, Mathurin Bruneau, Eleazer Williams, and Richemont.

== Biography ==
=== The schemes of Henri Hébert ===
Henri Hébert's existence was recorded for the first time in 1826, when he moved to Rouen, where he made a living as a temporary employee of the Seine-Inférieure Prefecture, then as the owner and shopkeeper of a glassworks.

Having become bankrupt around 1829, he fled Rouen, where he had been sentenced by default to three months in prison. It was around this time that he swindled a couple from Montigny-sur-Avre, M. and Mme. De Malard, who believed they had met the real Louis XVII.

He took advantage of the turmoil of the three "glorious days" of the July 1830 Revolution, during which he wrote manifests explaining his ambitions to several people, including the Duc de Choiseul. He changed his name and place of residence several times, giving himself the title "Baron de Richemont," all the while mingling with republican agitators and abusing many people's trust.

Hébert moved to Paris next, where he surrounded himself with accomplices and tried to thwart police investigations by using different addresses and different, borrowed names.

=== Richemont’s Theory of Survival ===
Richemont's version of the story begins around 1818, but over the years, he expanded it with new details. He appears to have drawn inspiration from Jean-Joseph Regnault-Warin's novel "The Magdalen Church-yard," which had earlier influenced Jean-Marie Hervagault. The novel popularised early survival theories involving substitution in the temple.

According to Richemont, Louis XVII was secretly removed from the Temple Prison in 1794 and replaced with another child. The alleged escape was organzied by the Prince de Condé and Vendéen General François de Charette, with the complicity of the wife of Antoine Simon, his jailer. He maintained that he was placed with the Republican army under a false name and entrusted first to General Jean-Baptiste Kléber, then to General Louis Desaix. After their deaths (Kléber in 1800, Desaix in 1800), he was sent to America by Joseph Fouché, minister of police. Upon returning to France, he was allegedly arrested on orders from Louis XVIII, who purportedly wanted to imprison his own nephew to an Austrian prison in Italy, so he could usurp the throne more easily.

This final claim of imprisonment may reflect Richemont's real 1818 arrest: traveling under the false name "Bourlon" or "Bourdon," he was arrested on 12 April 1818 near Mantua by agents of the Austrian police. After claiming to be Louis-Charles de Bourbon, he was placed in detention in the prison of Milan, from which he was released in October 1825. In his memoir My Prisons (1832), the Italian poet Silvio Pellico described meeting a prisoner in Milan's Saint Margaret prison in 1820 who claimed to be the Duke of Normandy. Fellow prisoner Alexandre Andryane also claimed to have glimpsed the same person. Pellico's account, published in Italian in 1832 and translated into French in 1833, came after Richemont's 1831 autobiography, but corroborated Richemont's presence in Lombard prisons in the 1820s.

Published for the first time in 1831, the false Louis XVII's autobiography was enriched with new—and sometimes contradictory—facts in the following years. Carefully ascribing important roles to deceased people (the Prince de Condé, for example, died in 1830 in unclear circumstances), he developed a conspiracy theory and amalgamated several famous mysteries into his claims (for example, the claim that the French magistrate Antoine Bernardin Fualdès, whose murder was widely discussed, was killed because he knew too much), as well as parts of the accounts of other False Dauphins and even people such as the "visionary" peasant Thomas Martin (who, ironically, supported Karl Wilhelm Naundorff, the Richemont's famous rival).

=== Arrest and trial (1833-1834) ===
Hébert was considered a suspect in the investigation of the republican plots of the Society for the Rights of Man. He was arrested in August 1833 on the order of the prefect of police, Henri Gisquet, who at that time confiscated a clumsily-coded planner, several political pamphlets, and a secret printing press used for several publications, including the autobiography of the so-called Louis XVII (possibly edited by the mysterious "Saint-Edme"). He also confiscated a "letter to the deputies" signed with the pseudonym "Jean Bonhomme," which was said to contain an insult to the king. Imprisoned at Sainte-Pélagie, Hébert was taken to Lyon to be confronted by witnesses. The inquest, the confrontations, and the simple cryptological analysis of the planner allowed the authorities to retrace Henri Hébert's movements and actions since his arrival in Rouen in 1826.

The trial of Hébert and his accomplices took place from 30 October to 5 November 1834, at the Assize Court of the Seine. Among the witnesses called to the stand was the last person responsible for guarding the dauphin, an old building-painter named Étienne Lasne (1756–1841). He confirmed that the true son of Louis XVI had died in his arms at the Temple Prison in 1795. During the October 31st session, a man called Morel de Saint-Didier, an emissary of Naundorff, spoke up to defend Naundorff's legitimacy and to accuse Hébert of being an impostor.

The defense could not find witnesses capable of supporting the survivalist theory. Alexandre Andryane admitted that the pseudo-Duke of Normandy who he had seen in Milan could have been Hébert but did not confirm any of his other claims. A Doctor Rémusat affirmed that he had taken the testimony of Marie-Jeanne Simon, but the words of Louis XVII's jailer's widow, who had died 15 years earlier in a hospice, did not carry much weight, especially since the Simons had left the Temple in January 1794. Hébert had originally dated his supposed escape to June 1794 before changing his version of events.

Having dismissed the accusation of a plot against the king and of fraud (for lack of complaints from any victims), the jury found Hébert guilty of all the other charges, including a plot against the State and press-related crimes.

=== Escape and demands of recognition ===
Hébert was condemned to serve a 12-year sentence in Sainte-Pélagie Prison, where, according to journalist Taxile Delord, his culinary talents were much appreciated by the other prisoners. Hébert escaped from prison on 19 August 1835 and took refuge abroad for several years. Returning to France around 1838, he benefited from an 1840 royal decree of amnesty towards political prisoners.

For many years, Richemont fought to obtain the official recognition of the Duchess of Angoulême, his supposed sister, yet in vain. An intermediary contacted her in 1840, and she was indignant at being approached. She told the emissary, "My brother, sir, died in the Temple, I'm certain of it, and the man of whom you're speaking to me is nothing but one more impostor to add to those who've already appeared." Hébert then contacted the Duke of Bordeaux, without much more success. Naundorff's death in 1845 only encouraged the Baron de Richemont's overtures and pursuits.

Again profiting from the revolutionary fervor of 1848, he tried to get recognition from the provisionary government, gave a speech at the Barrière du Maine club, and even declared himself a candidate in the April elections.

The following year, during which he claimed to have met Pope Pius IX in Gaeta, Italy, he tried to summon the Duchess of Angoulême to court in hopes of obtaining her recognition (and later, a part of her inheritance).

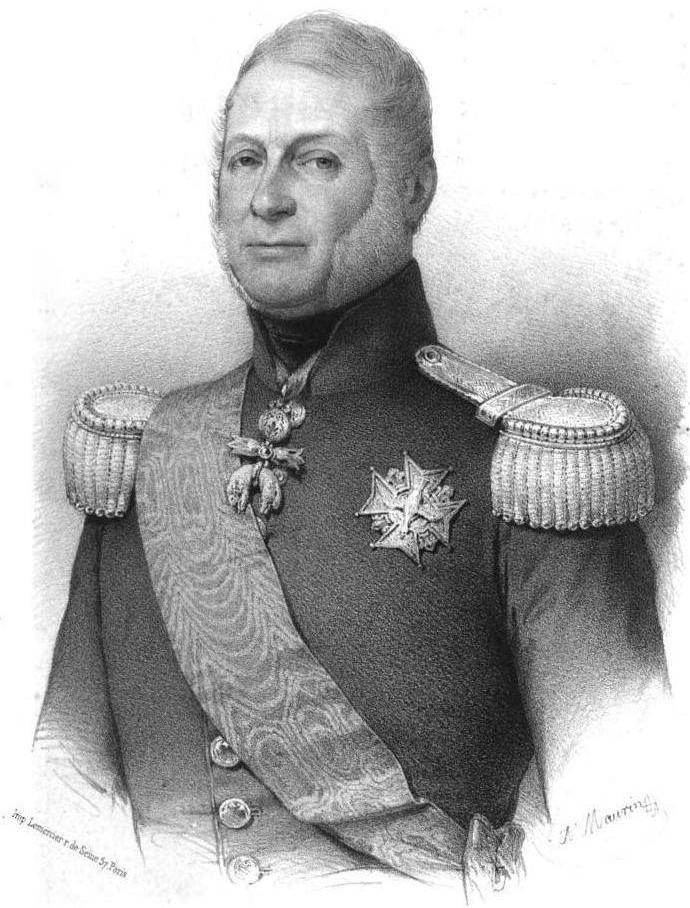
"The ex-Baron de Richemont" in 1850. Lithograph by Maurin, published in the biography written under the name Claravali del Curso.

Around 1850, another book about him was published, "Vie de Mgr le duc de Normandie," by a certain Claravali del Curso, possibly a new accomplice or simply a nom de plume of the Baron de Richemont. In addition to this new book, de Richemont used a bimonthly publication called "L'inflexible, journal des intérêts de tous" (1849–1851) to defend his interests.

=== Death ===
In 1853, Richemont went to stay at the Château de Vaurenard in Gleizé, the home of the Countess of Apchier. Her husband had been Louis XVI's page. While there, he died of apoplexy on 10 August 1853. His death certificate, witnessed by those he had deceived, referred to him as ‘Louis-Charles of France’. A tribunal in Villefranche on 12 September 1859, judged that the certificate had to be "rectified, in accordance with the fact that it wrongly certifies the death of Louis-Charles of France, whereas it should be limited to certifying the death of an unknown person calling himself Baron de Richemont." The epitaph on his tomb was the same and was also corrected by order of the authorities.

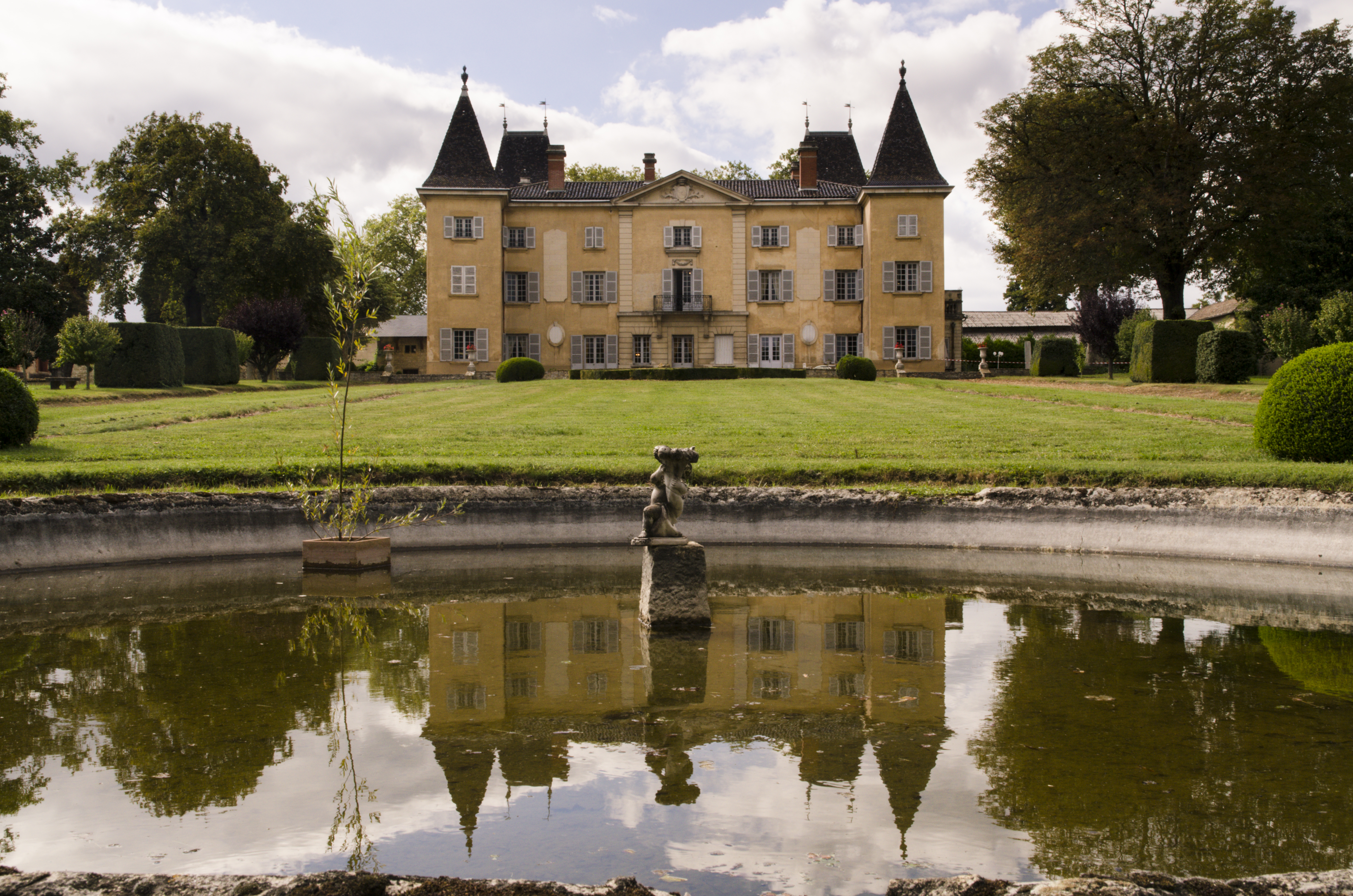
The Chateau de Vaurenard, where the Baron de Richemont died in 1853.

Richemont had no known masculine descendants, so his partisans (including the sculptor Foyatier, the nun Elisabeth Eppinger, and even the former bishop of Strasbourg, Monseigneur Tharin), consigned him to history and to his mysteries. A historian, Michel Wartelle, still supports the theory that the he really was Louis XVII.

== Possible alias ==
In June 1842, Richemont, then living at 45 Quai de Valmy, Paris, was again arrested by police, who thought he was Claude Perrin, a criminal who was wanted for several acts of fraud in another province. Richemont immediately denied it and was released after 40 hours due to lack of evidence.

== Bibliography ==
- Jean de Bonnefon, Le baron de Richemont, fils de Louis XVI
- Henri Gisquet, Mémoires de M. Gisquet, ancien préfet de police, écrits par lui-même, t. III, Paris, Marchant, 1840, p. 34-53.
- Joseph-Marie Quérard, Les Supercheries littéraires dévoilées, t. III, Paris, 1850, p. 69-121.
- Armand Fouquier, Causes célèbres de tous les peuples, t. II, no 38 (« Les Faux dauphins »), Paris, 1859.
- Rene Le Conte, Louis XVII et les faux Dauphins
