= Gleizé =

- Commune
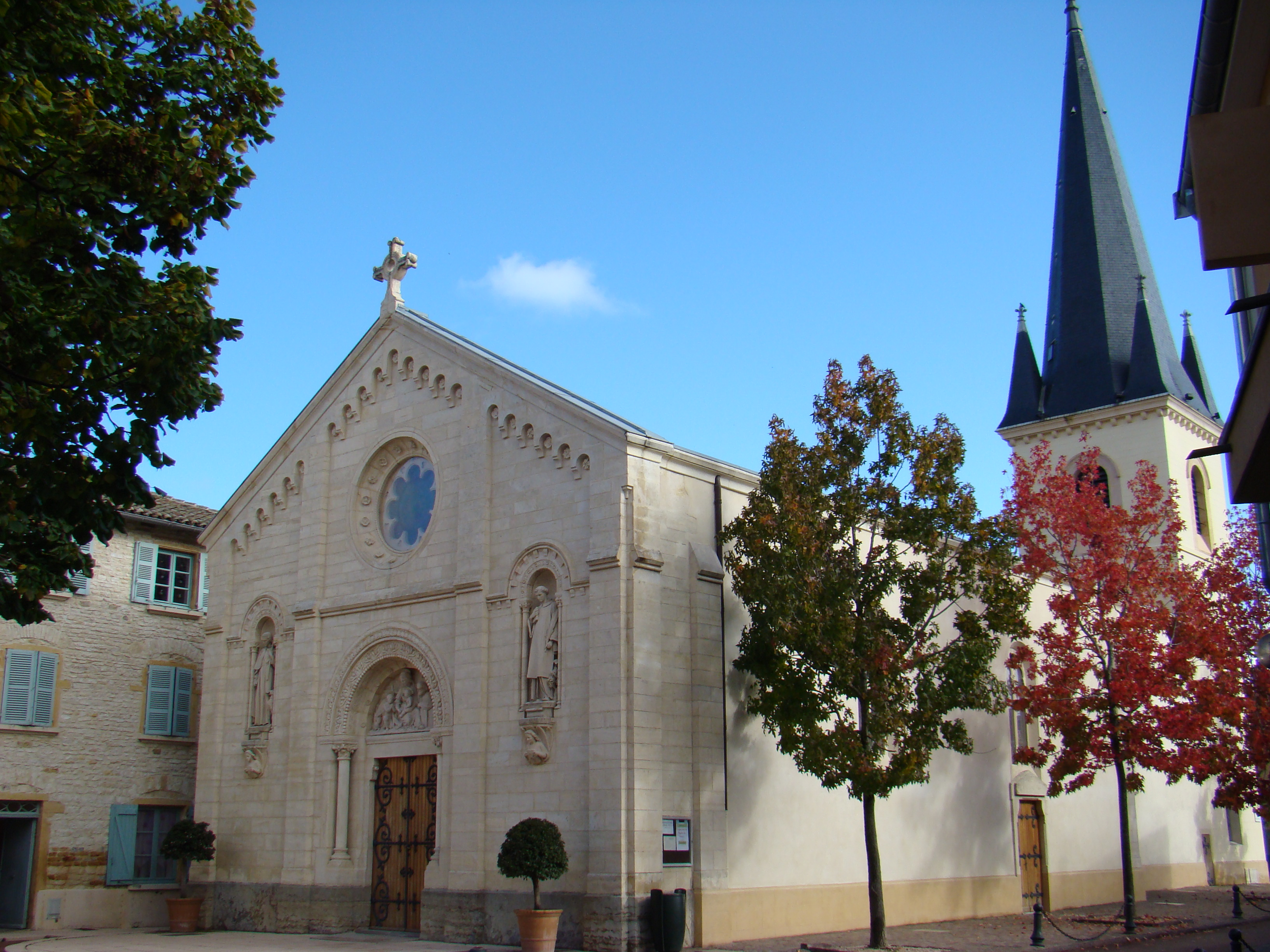
- The church in Gleizé
- Location of Gleizé
- Location within France Location within Auvergne-Rhône-Alpes
- Coordinates: 45°59′24″N 4°41′51″E
- Country: France
- Region: Auvergne-Rhône-Alpes
- Department: Rhône
- Arrondissement: Villefranche-sur-Saône
- Canton: Gleizé
- Intercommunality: CA Villefranche Beaujolais Saône

Government
  - Mayor (2020–2026): Ghislain de Longevialle
- Area^{1}: 10.46 km^{2} (4.04 sq mi)
- Elevation: 234 m (768 ft)
- Highest elevation: 292 m (958 ft)
- Lowest elevation: 181 m (594 ft)
- Population (2023): 8,035
  - Density: 768.2/km^{2} (1,990/sq mi)
- Time zone: UTC+01:00 (CET)
  - Summer (DST): UTC+02:00 (CEST)
- INSEE/Postal code: 69092 /69400
- ^{1} French Land Register data, which excludes lakes, ponds, glaciers > 1 km^{2} (0.386 sq mi or 247 acres) and river estuaries.

Gleizé (French pronunciation: [ɡlɛze]) is a commune in the Rhône department in eastern France.

== Population ==
Historical population
Year	Pop.	±% p.a.
1968	3,045	—
1975	3,708	+2.85%
1982	6,591	+8.56%
1990	8,317	+2.95%
1999	8,050	−0.36%
2007	7,766	−0.45%
2012	7,605	−0.42%
2017	7,472	−0.35%
2023	8,035	+1.22%
Source: INSEE

== Culture and heritage ==
=== Places and monuments ===
- Castle of Vaurenard : This is where the Baron de Richemont died.
- Castle Montfleury.
- Castle of Saint-Fonds.
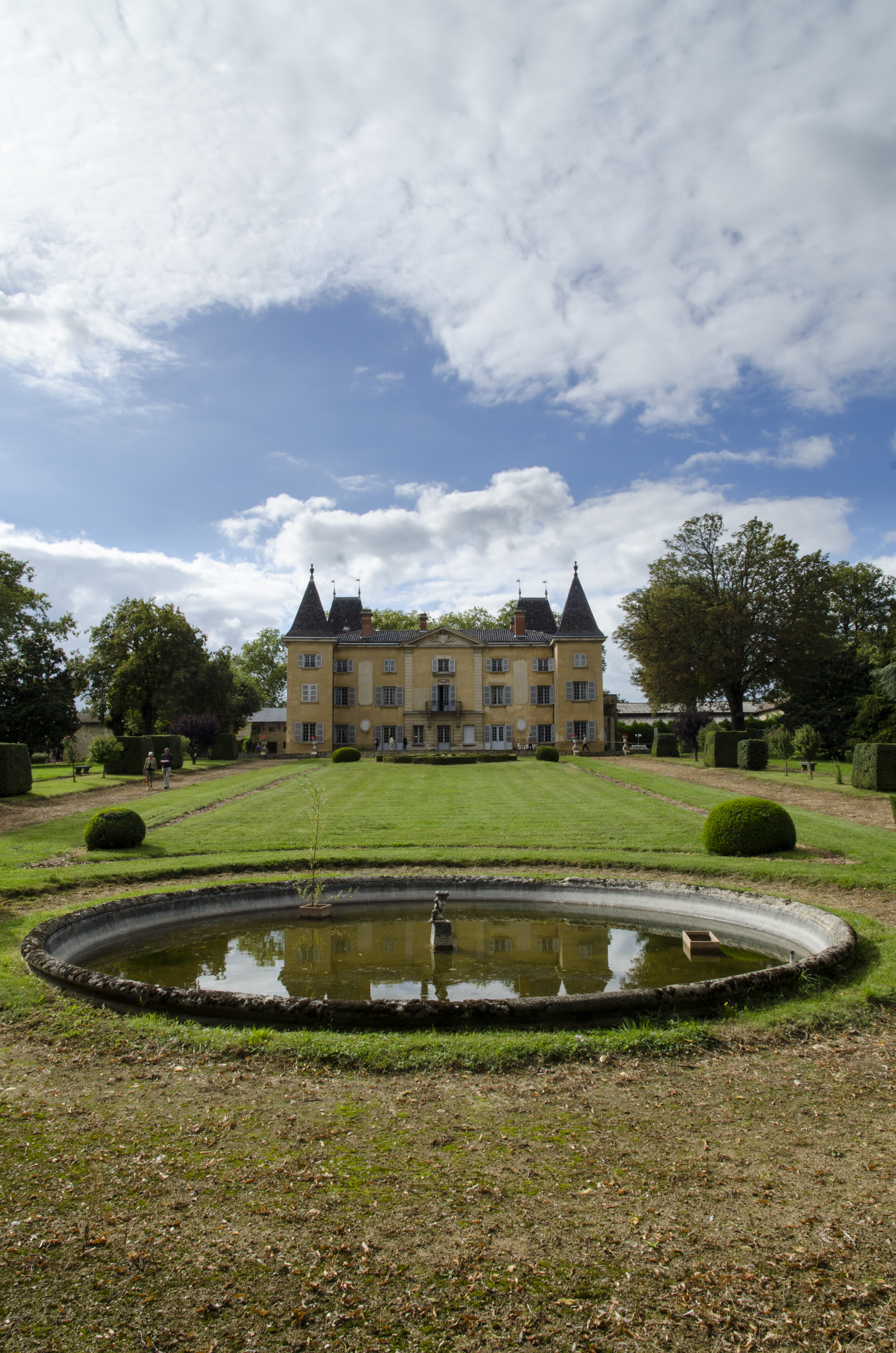
Castle of Vaurenard

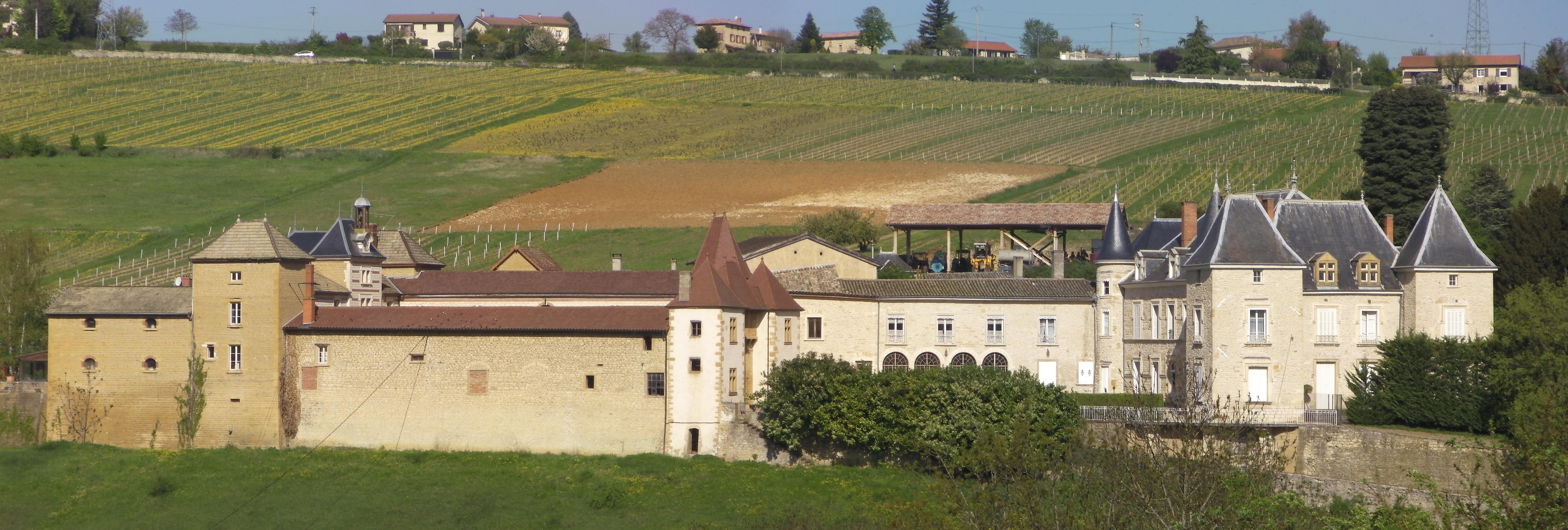
Castle of Saint-Fonds

=== Personalities ===
- Baron de Richemont, died in Gleizé August 10, 1853, French crook who pretended to be Louis XVII.
- Kevin Joss-Rauze, born in Gleizé, professional basketball player.
- Rudy Molard, a French road cyclist, was born there.

== See also ==
- Communes of the Rhône department
- Rhône-Alpes
