= Jean-Baptiste Dumangin =

French physician

Jean-Baptiste Eugénie Dumangin
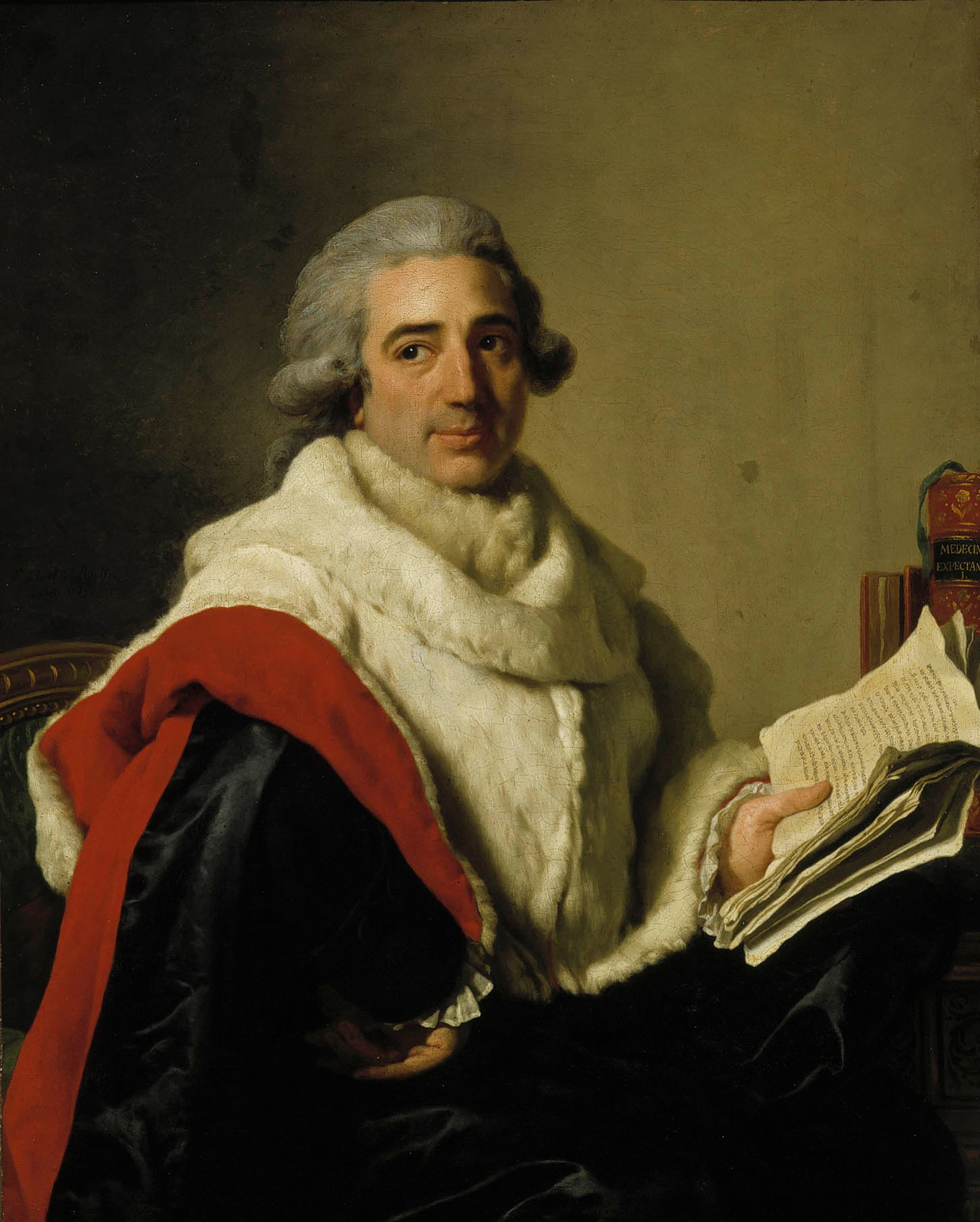
- Jean-Baptiste Eugénie Dumangin, doctor in ceremonial dress, painted by Alexandre Roslin (1718-1793), Swedish painter - Paris 1789 - 102 x 80 cm - Sinebrychoff Museum Helsinki Finland
- Born: March 7, 1744; Château-Thierry, Aisne, France
- Died: March 28, 1826 (aged 82); Saint-Prix, Val d'Oise, France
- Occupation: Professor of Pharmacy
- Years active: 1780-1820
- Known for: Autopsy of Louis XVII
- Medical career
- Profession: Physician
- Field: Therapeutics
- Institutions: Hôpital de la Charité

Jean-Baptiste Eugénie Dumangin (or Du Mangin) (7 March 1744 – 28 March 1826) was a French medical doctor known to have participated in the final treatment and autopsy of Louis XVII, the younger son of King Louis XVI and Queen Marie Antoinette. His two favourite fields were therapeutics and hygiene.

== Biography ==
He was born in Château-Thierry (Aisne), son of Jean Dumangin (1710–1769), directeur des Aides (Note: A Directeur des Aides et Droits was a senior clerk in the finance administration in a généralité: he directed the clerks of the control room in a Généralité and reported on his operations to the Director General of the King's Farms.), and Jeanne Eugénie de La Haye de la Gonnière. He was received as a doctor in Paris on 15 September 1768 and made "acte de régence" on 17 September of the same year. (Note: To make "acte de régence" consisted in presiding over the defence of a candidate's thesis out of turn.) In 1780, he was elected Professor of Pharmacy at the Faculty of Medicine and Doctor of the Hôpital de la Charité (renamed Hospice de l'Unité during the revolutionary period) in Paris. He worked there with Jean-Nicolas Corvisart (1755–1821), who became Napoleon's first physician and a member of the Académie Nationale de Médecine.

He was editor of the Journal de médecine, de chirurgie et de pharmacie from 1776.

== Political life ==
On 21 April 1789, Dumangin was designated by the 367 citizens of the Assembly of the Third State of the district of Saint-Germain l'Auxerrois, to be one of the 405 Parisian voters to take part, from 12 to 18 May, in the election of the 20 deputies of the Third State representing the city of Paris at the Estates General of 1789.

On 18 May 1789, during the election of Abbé Sieyès, he wrote a protest against the election of a clergyman by the assembly of the Third State.

He was a member of the "Permanent Committee" set up on 13 July at the Town Hall to provide for the subsistence and organisation of the militia; then, three weeks later, he was a member of the "Provisional Committee for Police, Security and Tranquillity" of Paris. As a member of this committee, he signed a decree suspending the performances of Marie-Joseph Chénier's tragedy, Charles IX, or St. Bartholomew's day.

However, his political activity declined. In March 1790, he and Guillotin asked to be appointed doctors of the Parisian National Guard without any salary. He became a member of the Société des Amis de la Constitution and joined the Feuillants club on 18 July 1791. It represented the last and most vigorous attempt of the moderate constitutional monarchists to steer the course of the revolution away from the radical Jacobins.

The National Legislative Assembly (1 October 1791) did not include Dumangin in its ranks and he was sought during the Terror.

== Buyer of Biens nationaux ==
On January 8, 1791, Dumangin acquired the "Château de Rubelles" in Saint-Prix, a village of 515 inhabitants north-west of Paris in the Montmorency valley. He had it demolished to keep only the "Château des Vendôme" acquired in the same lot. This property belonged to André Louis Sulpice d'Albert who died on 22 December 1788, former president of the "Cour des monnaies".

Dumangin bought other property by dispossessing the former lord of Saint-Prix, François Nicolas Le Bas du Plessis (1740–1819). On 13 September 1797, Demangin denounced Mme du Plessis, wife of this lord of Saint-Prix, as an emigrant and liable to deportation. On 9 November he took the lot and reunited the two hectares adjoining his residence with the ten hectares of the seigniory: the "château" and the park of Saint-Prix.

== Care and autopsy of Louis XVII ==
On 28 July 1794, the representative of the people Paul Barras was charged by the Comité de Salut public to visit Louis XVII, last male prisoner of the Temple (Note: The last prisoner was Marie Thérèse of France liberated on 18 December 1795, on the eve of her seventeenth birthday, exchanged for prominent French prisoners (Pierre Riel de Beurnonville, Jean-Baptiste Drouet, Hugues-Bernard Maret, Armand-Gaston Camus, Nicolas Marie Quinette, and Charles-Louis Huguet de Sémonville) and taken to Vienna, the capital city of her cousin, the Holy Roman Emperor Francis II, and also her mother's birthplace). The young prince had pains in his knees and ankles and was bloated. On 26 February 1795, the commissioners noted the existence of tumours in all the joints. On 6 May 1795, the Comité de Salut public sent Pierre-Joseph Desault, chief surgeon of the Hospice de l'Humanité (Hôtel-Dieu), to give him treatment. Desault visited him every day but died the next month. The rumour that his death was caused by poisoning during this summons was disproved by the autopsy carried out by his pupil, Xavier Bichat.

Philippe-Jean Pelletan, chief surgeon of the Hospice de perfectionnement de l'Hôtel-Dieu, succeeded Desault as of June 5; but, not wanting to take sole responsibility for the treatment, he asked that the Security Committee be willing to add Dumangin to his staff, which was granted. On June 7, Dumangin saw the patient for the first time and found that he was extremely weak, had swollen joints, all the symptoms of lymphatism with chronic diarrhoea.

The patient died the next day 8 June 1795 (20 prairial year III) probably from ulcero-caseous peritonitis of hematogenous origin during chronic disseminated tuberculosis. On 9 June, four members of the General Security Committee visited the corpse and noted the death. The act reads as follows:

"Death certificate of Louis Capet, of the 20th of this month, three hours after noon, aged ten years and two months, born in Versailles, department of Seine-et-Oise, domiciled in Paris at the Tours du Temple, section du Temple, son of Louis Capet, last king of the French and Marie-Antoinette-Josèphe Jeanne of Austria."

As soon as the convention was informed of the death, it prescribed the addition of two doctors to Pelletan and Dumangin to perform the autopsy. Pierre Lassus and Nicolas Dieudonné Jeanroy were added to them. The autopsy report was written by Dumangin. He wrote:

The day in the Temple this twenty-first Prairial of the third year of the French Republic one and indivisible, at half past eleven in the morning.
We, the undersigned, Jean-Baptiste-Eugénie Dumangin, chief doctor of the hospice de l'Unité, and Philippe-Jean Pelletan, chief surgeon of the Grand Hospice de l'Humanité, accompanied by the citizens Nicolas Jeanroy, former professor at the medical schools of Paris, and Pierre Lassus, professor of forensic medicine at the Paris School of Health, whom we joined by virtue of an order of the General Safety Committee of the National Convention, dated yesterday, and signed by Bergouien, President, Courtois, Gaultier, Pierre, Guyomar; for the purpose of proceeding together to open the body of the son of the deceased Louis Capet, and to ascertain its condition, have acted as follows:
Arriving every four of us at eleven o'clock in the morning at the outer gate of the Temple, we were received there by the commissioners, who introduced us into the tower. Having reached the second floor, we entered a flat, in the second room of which we found in a bed the dead body of a child who appeared to us to be about ten years old, whom the commissioners told us was the son of the late Louis Capet, and whom two of us recognised as the child they had been caring for some days. The aforementioned commissioners told us that this child had died the day before, at about three o'clock in the morning; on which we tried to verify the signs of death, which we found to be characterised by universal pallor, the cold of the body, the stiffness of the limbs, the dull eyes, the ordinary purple spots on the skin of a corpse, and above all by putrefaction beginning in the belly, scrotum and inner thighs.
We noticed, before we opened the body, a general thinness, which is that of the marasmus; the belly was excessively stretched and meteorised. On the inner side of the right knee, we noticed a tumour without any change of colour in the skin, and another tumour of less volume on the radius bone, near the wrist on the left side. The knee tumour contained about two ounces of a greyish, puriform, lymphatic material between the periosteum and the muscles; the wrist tumour contained a similar but thicker material. When the belly was opened, more than a pint of purulent, yellowish and very fetid serosity flowed out. The intestines were meteorised, pale, adhering to each other and to the walls of this cavity; they were sprinkled with a large quantity of tubers of various sizes, which presented at their opening the same matter as that contained in the outer deposits of the knee and wrist.
The intestines, open in all their length, were very healthy internally, and contained only a small amount of bilious matter. The stomach presented the same condition; it was adherent to all the surrounding parts, pale on the outside, with small lymphatic tubercles, similar to those on the surface of the intestines; its inner membrane was healthy, as were the pylorus and the oesophagus; the liver was adherent by its convexity to the diaphragm, and by its concavity to the viscera which it covers; its substance was healthy, its volume ordinary, the vesicle of the gall poorly filled with a dark green bile. The spleen, pancreas, kidneys and bladder were healthy; the omentum and mesentery, devoid of fat, were filled with lymphatic tubercles similar to those mentioned. Such tumours were scattered throughout the thickness of the peritoneum, covering the underside of the diaphragm, this muscle was healthy.
The lungs adhered to the entire surface of the pleura, diaphragm and pericardium. Their substance was healthy and free of tubercles; there were only a few around the trachea and oesophagus. The pericardium contained the usual amount of serosity; the heart was pale, but in its natural state.
The brain and its dependencies were in the most perfect integrity. All the disorders we have just detailed are obviously the effect of a long-existing scrophular defect, to which the death of the child must be attributed. The present report was drawn up and closed in Paris, at the above-mentioned place, by the undersigned, at four and a half hours' notice, on the day and year above.

— Dumangin, Lassus, PH. J. Pelletan, N. Jeanroy.

== Empire and Restoration ==
In 1801, Dumangin was one of the twenty-four members of the General Council of the Department of the Seine, which served as Paris City Council.

On 27 January 1809, at the age of 64, he married his third wife, Anne de Coste de la Calprenède, aged 21, a distant descendant of Gauthier de Costes, seigneur de la Calprenède. (Note: Demangin married Marie Caroline Brou in the early 1770s, then in 1778 Anne Catherine Caliste Des Essartz (died 1788), daughter of Jean-Charles Desessartz, Doctor Regent of the Faculty of Medicine of Paris. As a widower, Jean-Baptiste Dumangin frequented the Parisian places of pleasure and became friends with a former dancer of the Opera that he maintained, Suzanne Dorothée Rihm (1741-1810). Young, her beauty and charms had not left Louis XV indifferent.)

A final episode opposed Pelletan and Dumangin after the Bourbon Restoration of 1815. Following a tradition of preserving royal hearts, Louis XVII's heart was removed and smuggled out during the autopsy by Pelletan. Thus, Louis' heart was not interred with the rest of the body. Pelletan stored the smuggled heart in distilled wine in order to preserve it. However, after 8 to 10 years the distilled wine had evaporated, and the heart was from that time kept dry.

In 1817, Pelletan attempted to give the Louis XVII's heart to his uncle, Louis XVIII, because the king had expressed his intention to show some gratitude to those who had shown sympathy for his family in times of trouble. But Pelletan did not mention his colleague Dumangin: the latter expressed his displeasure and a discussion arose between the two doctors. Anyway, Louis XVIII refused the "gift" because he could not bring himself to believe that was the heart of his nephew. Pelletan then donated the heart to the Archbishop of Paris, Hyacinthe-Louis de Quélen.

After forty years of service in the hospital, Dumangin retired in 1820 at Saint-Prix, Val-d'Oise, near Montmorency, where he died on 28 March 1826 at the age of 82 without obtaining the Legion of Honour.
