= Kevin Joss-Rauze =

French basketball player (born 1988)

Kevin Joss-Rauze (born 28 June 1988 in Gleizé) is a French basketball player who played for LNB Pro A club JDA Dijon Basket during the 2006-2009 seasons.
