= Château de Vaurenard =

Château in Gleizé, Rhône, France

Coordinates: 45.9940°N 4.6962°E

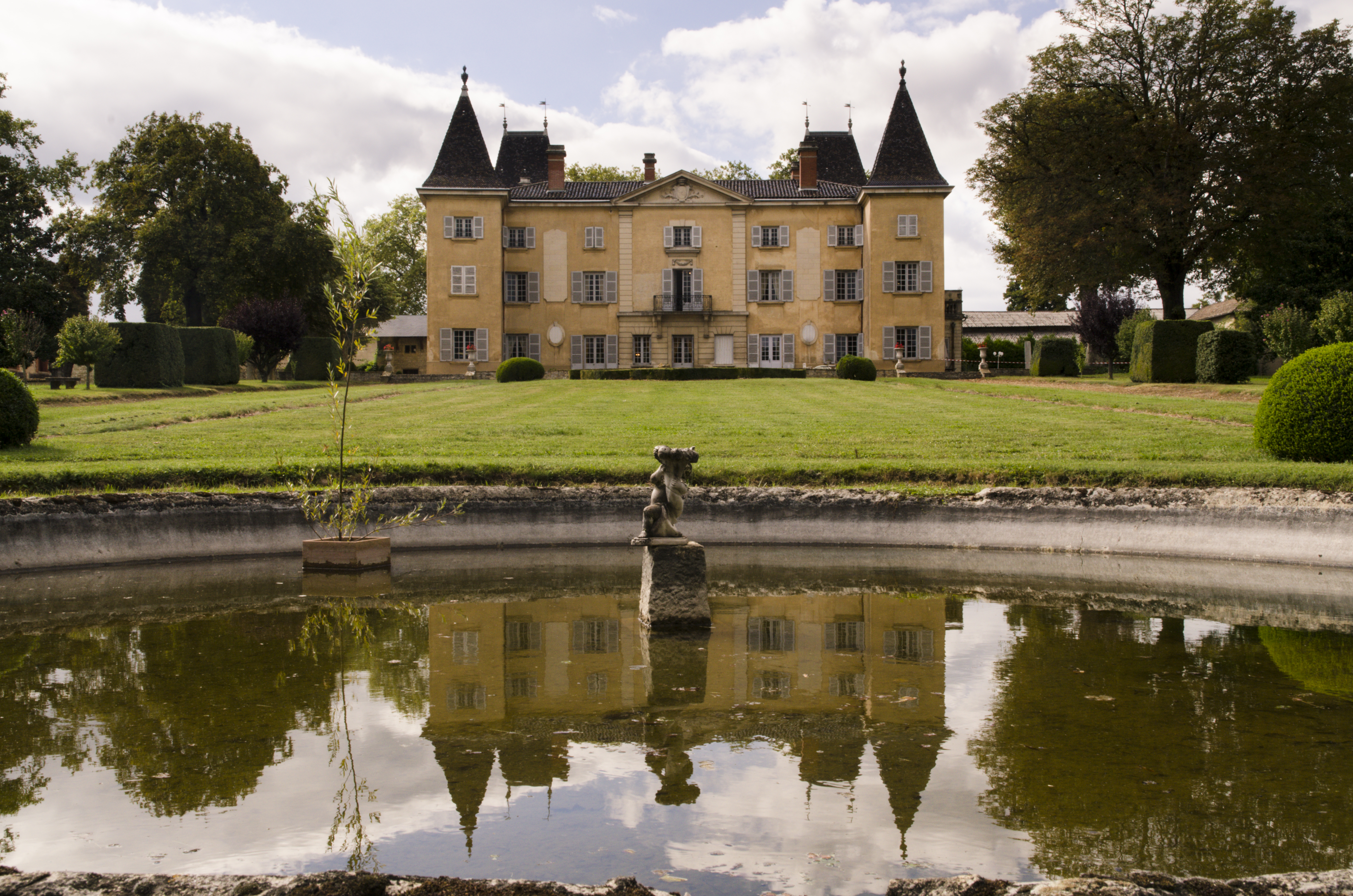
Château de Vaurenard

The Château de Vaurenard is a château in Gleizé, Rhône, France. The land was acquired by 1672, and it is owned by a descendant of the same family.

The château was built in the 17th and 18th centuries. It has been listed as an official historical monument since November 12, 2007. The château produces wine from vines grown on 25 hectares surrounding the property.

The château has been listed as an official historical monument since 12 November 2007. This confers legal protection under French heritage law, recognizing its architectural and historical value.
