= Karl Wilhelm Naundorff =

Imposter of Louis XVII of France (died 1845)

Karl-Wilhelm Naundorff
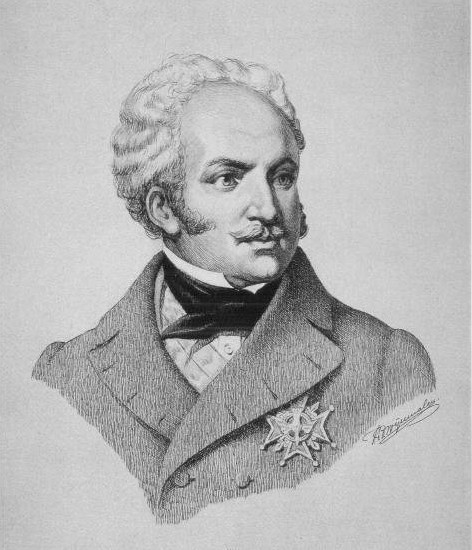
- Naundorff in 1845
- Born: Unknown
- Died: 10 August 1845; Delft, Kingdom of the Netherlands
- Known for: Imposter of Louis XVII

Karl Wilhelm Naundorff (d. 10 August 1845) was a German clockmaker and watchmaker who until his death was a pretender to the throne of France, claiming to be Louis XVII, son of Louis XVI and Marie Antoinette. Naundorff was one of the more stubborn of more than thirty men who claimed to be Louis XVII.

== Biography ==
The first records of Karl Wilhelm Naundorff are from 1810 in Spandau, Berlin, where he received the citizenship of Prussia. By 1822 he had moved to live with a family in Brandenburg-on-the-Havel where he was later accused of arson. In 1824, Naundorff was jailed for three years for counterfeiting.

=== Impersonation ===
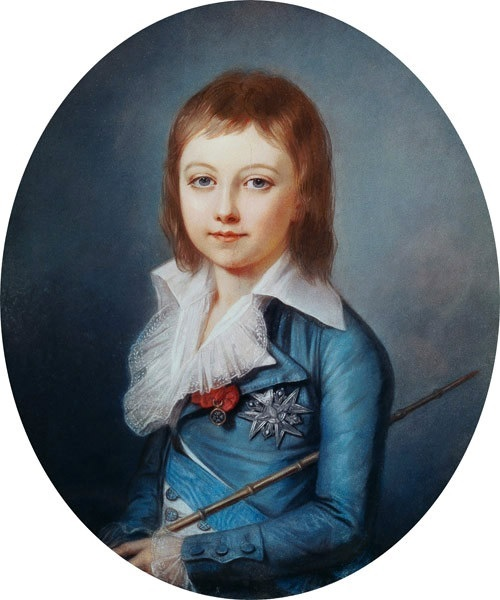
Louis Charles of France (Louis XVII).

Prince Louis-Charles, the son of Louis XVI and Marie Antoinette, was imprisoned during the French Revolution and died in prison in 1795. However, there were various rumors that monarchist sympathizers had spirited the young dauphin away from the Temple prison and that he was living elsewhere in secret.

Among those said to be involved in his escape are Paul Barras and Josephine Beauharnais.

When Naundorff was released from prison in 1827, he moved to Crossen and wrote the first of two books of would-be-memoirs. The second he wrote in England many years later and was translated to English by Charles G. Perceval, Rector of Calverton, Buckinghamshire, and nephew of Spencer Perceval. He claimed that he had been substituted with a deaf and mute orphan who died soon afterward and that he had been hidden in a secret area of the Tower of the Temple until his escape. He also claimed that he was later recaptured by Napoleon's forces and secretly kept in several dungeons throughout Europe until finally escaping in his mid-twenties. He could present no proof of any of this.

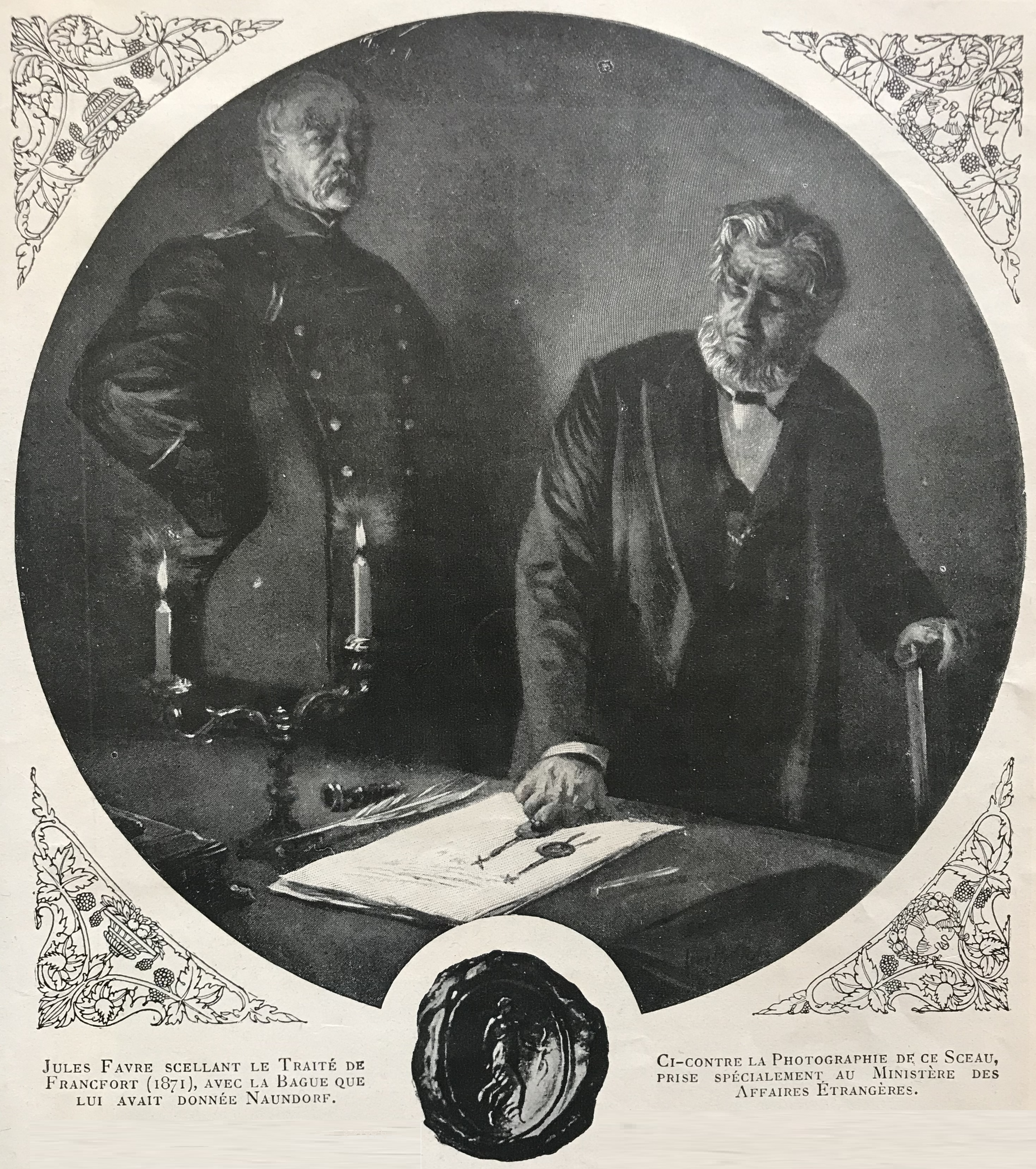
Using a ring he had received from Naundorff, Jules Favre, French Minister of Foreign Affairs, puts his seal on the Treaty of Frankfurt.

In 1833, Naundorff travelled to Paris where another claimant to the French throne, the Baron de Richemont, was on trial. One of the witnesses for the prosecution read out his letter as a counterclaim.

Despite the fact that Naundorff did not speak French very well, he managed to convince various former members of Louis XVI's court that he was the Dauphin. He seemed to know everything about the private life of the royal court, gave right answers to most questions and spoke to courtiers as if he had known them as a child. One of them was Agathe de Rambaud, Louis' childhood nurse who accepted him. Others who claimed to have recognized him as the prince include Étienne de Joly, King Louis XVI's Minister of Justice, and Jean Bremond, the king's personal secretary.

However, Marie-Thérèse, Duchess of Angouleme, the sister of Prince Louis, did not acknowledge him. She had seen pictures of him, but claimed that she did not see any resemblance to her brother. She refused even to see him, despite having seen other claimants who were not represented by former members of the royal court. On one occasion Agathe de Rambaud travelled to Prague by carriage to persuade her but to no avail. The princess refused to see her as well.

In 1836, Naundorff sued Marie Thérèse for property that supposedly belonged to him. Instead, the police force of king Louis Philippe I arrested him, seized all his papers and deported him to England. There he worked to develop several military inventions, including an early grenade, and a recoilless rifle which he eventually sold to the Dutch Military. He declared that he would be restored to the throne on 1 January 1840. When that date passed, he lost the majority of his supporters.

=== Legacy and continued controversy ===
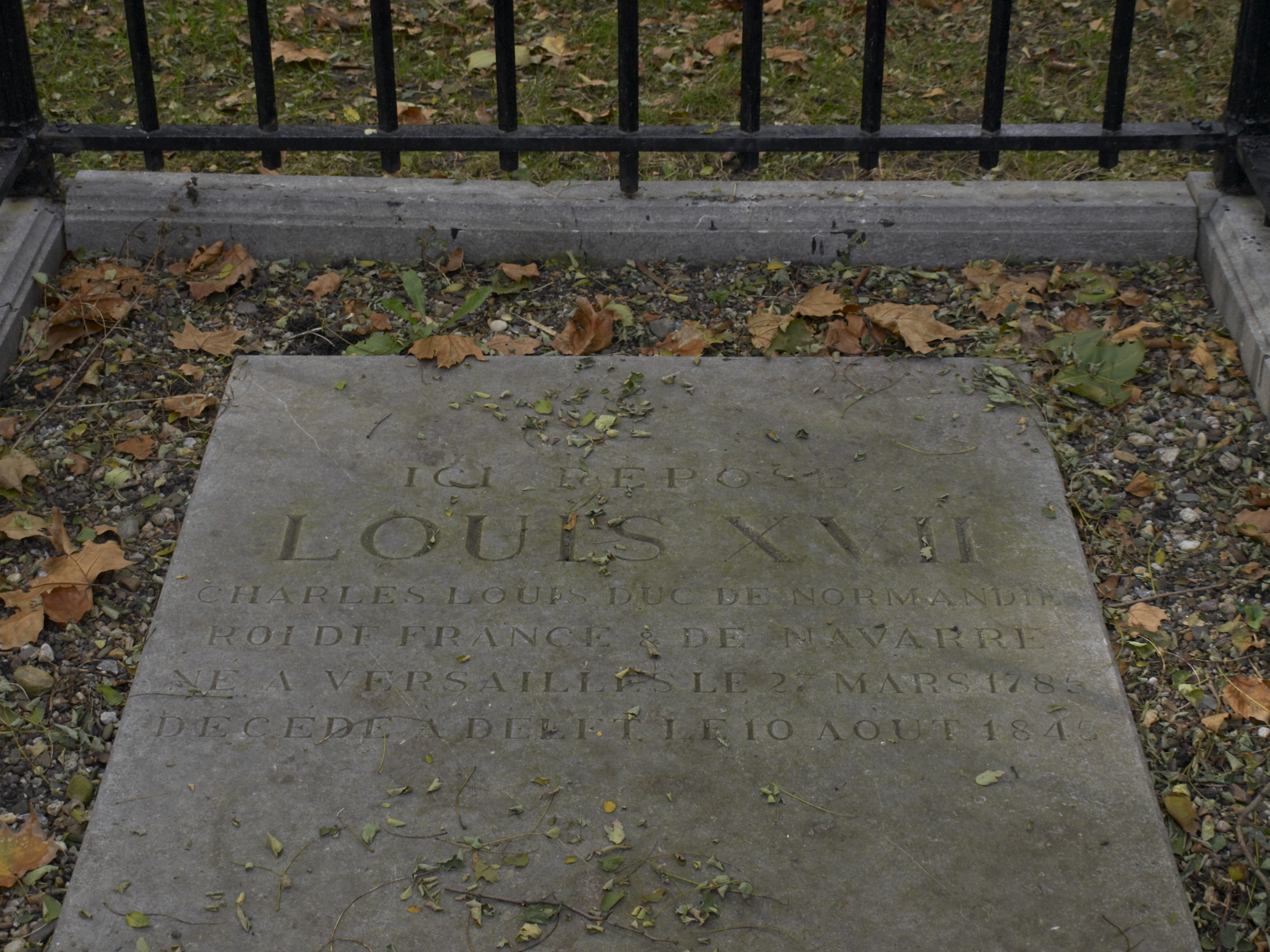
Naundorff's grave in Delft. The inscription says "Here rests Louis XVII".

Naundorff died on 10 August 1845 in Delft, the Netherlands, possibly of poisoning. He had been living there with his family after being made Director of Pyrotechnics for the Dutch Military. He still had some supporters because the epitaph on his grave reads "Here lies Louis XVII, King of France" and in his death certificate he is named as "Charles-Louis de Bourbon, Duke of Normandy (Louis XVII), who was known under the name of Charles-Guillaume Naundorff, [...] son of His Majesty the late Louis XVI, King of France and of Her Imperial and Royal Highness Marie Antoinette, Archduchess of Austria, Queen of France, who both died in Paris".

Naundorff's descendants did not give up. Some of them insisted on using the surname "de Bourbon" and they petitioned for recognition to French courts and senates all through the 19th and 20th centuries. Circus director René Charles de Bourbon, an illegitimate son of one of Naundorff's grandchildren, lost his claim in a French court in 1954. However, some of the descendants still press the claim.

A handful of French historians insist that DNA testing finally resolved the issue of Naundorff's claim. In a research in 1998-2000, mitochondrial DNA sequences of remains that researchers have claimed to have belonged to Naundorff were compared with sequences obtained from the remains of Marie-Antoinette and two of her sisters and two living maternal relatives. They argue that differences in the nucleotide sequences make it very unlikely that Naundorff was the son of Marie-Antoinette. A group of his descendants disagree that the remains are those of Naundorff and are independently continuing the investigation. As of 2014-16, based on DNA extracted from Naundorff's hair, it was found that there are 7 out of 16 sequence differences of Y-STR from the Y-chromosome between Naundorff and Louis XVI, therefore making Naundorff unlikely the son of Louis XVI.
