= Philippe-Jean Pelletan =

French surgeon (1747–1829)

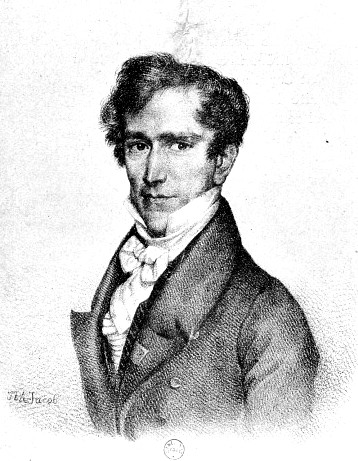
- Portrait of Philippe Pelletan
- Born: 4 May 1747; Paris
- Died: 26 September 1829 (aged 82)

Philippe-Jean Pelletan (4 May 1747 – 26 September 1829) was a French surgeon born in Paris. Son of a surgeon, Pelletan was a member of the Académie Royale de Chirurgie and of the Académie des Sciences. He was a professor to the Faculté de Médecine de Paris, and in 1789 elected surgeon of the Garde Nationale. On 13 July 1793, moments after the assassination of Jean-Paul Marat by Charlotte Corday, Pelletan was present at the crime scene. The minutes on the death certificate bear his signature.

In 1795 he succeeded Pierre-Joseph Desault (1738–1795) as chief surgeon at the Hôtel-Dieu. Following the death of 10-year-old Louis XVII on 8 June 1795, he was responsible for performing the autopsy. In 1804 Jean-Nicolas Corvisart (1755–1821) had Pelletan appointed consultant-surgeon to the Emperor Napoleon.

While chief surgeon at the Hôtel-Dieu, Pelletan was involved in a case of misdiagnosis that led to the death of a patient. An opportunistic Guillaume Dupuytren (1777–1835) informed the personal physician of Tsar Alexander of the situation, which triggered an investigation into the matter. Because of the mistake, on 6 September 1815, Dupuytren was named as Pelletan's replacement as chief-surgeon at the Hôtel-Dieu.
