= Louis XVII =

Heir and claimant to the French throne (1785–1795)

- Dauphin of France
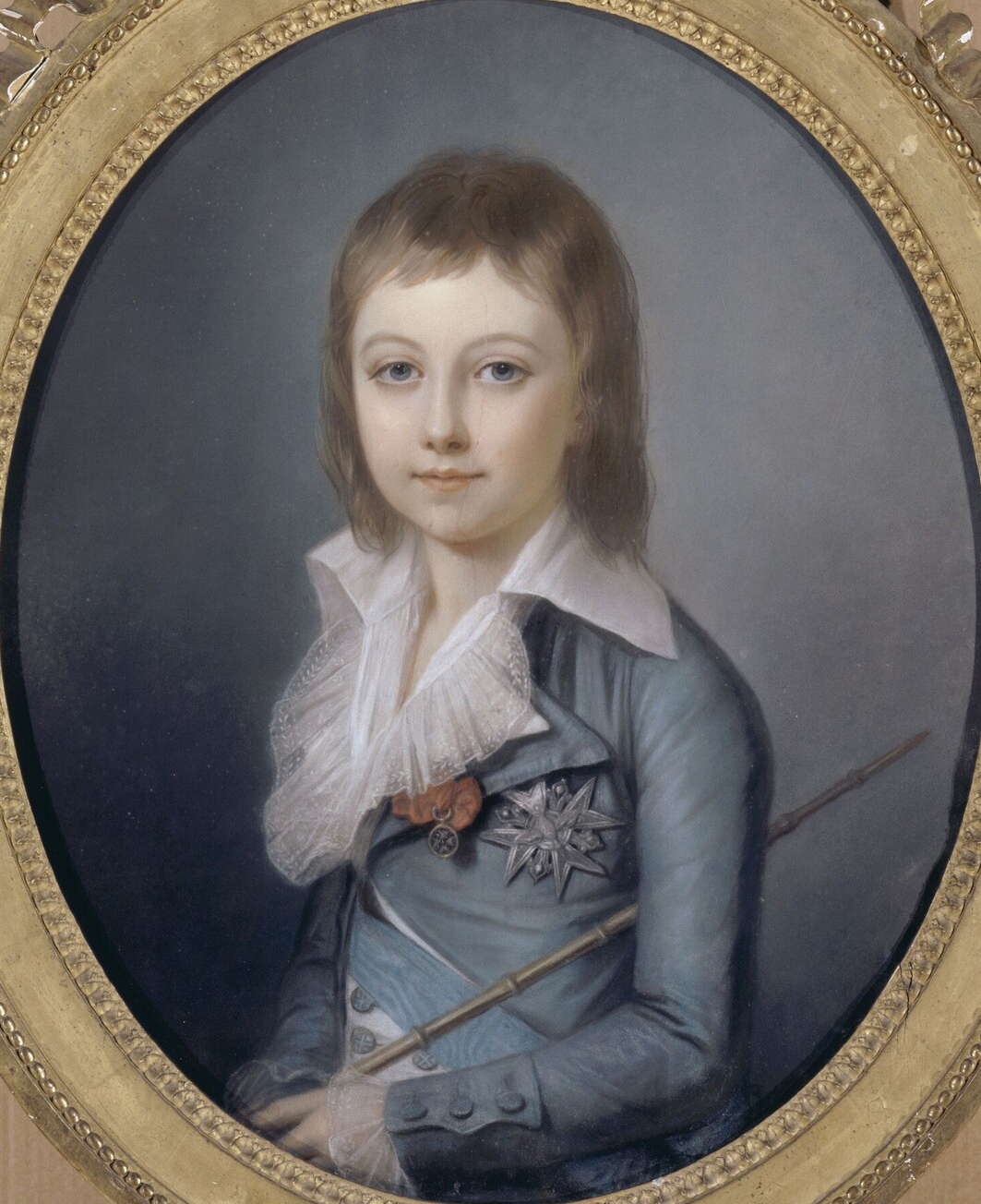
- Portrait, 1792

King of France (claimant)
- Tenure: 21 January 1793 – 8 June 1795
- Predecessor: Louis XVI
- Successor: Louis XVIII
- Born: Louis Charles, Duke of Normandy; 27 March 1785; Palace of Versailles, France
- Died: 8 June 1795 (aged 10); Paris Temple, France
- Burial: 10 June 1795; Cimetière Sainte-Marguerite, Paris
- House: Bourbon
- Father: Louis XVI
- Mother: Marie Antoinette

Louis XVII (born Louis Charles, Duke of Normandy; 27 March 1785 – 8 June 1795) was the younger son of King Louis XVI of France and Queen Marie Antoinette. His older brother, Louis Joseph, Dauphin of France, died in June 1789, a little over a month before the start of the French Revolution. At his brother's death he became the new Dauphin (heir apparent to the throne), a title he held until 1791, when the new constitution accorded the heir apparent the title of Prince Royal.

When his father was executed on 21 January 1793, during the middle period of the French Revolution, he automatically succeeded as King of France, Louis XVII, in the eyes of the royalists. France was by then a republic, and since Louis-Charles was imprisoned and died in captivity in June 1795, he never actually ruled. Nevertheless, in 1814 after the Bourbon Restoration, his uncle acceded to the throne and was proclaimed his successor, as Louis XVIII.

== Biography ==
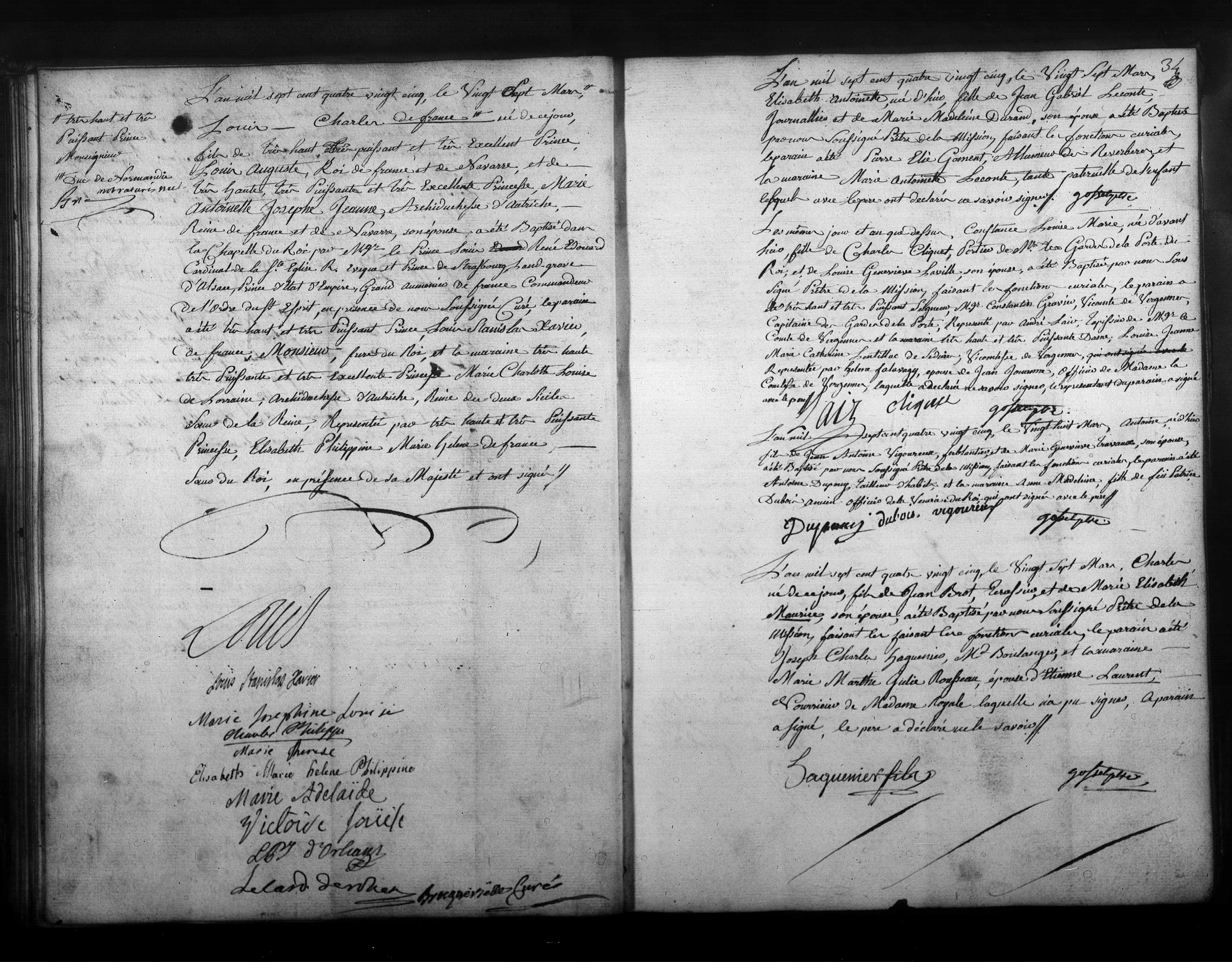
Baptismal certificate, Parish of Notre-Dame

Louis-Charles de France was born at the Palace of Versailles, the second son and third child of his parents, Louis XVI and Marie-Antoinette. He was named after his father and his mother's favourite sister Maria Carolina, Queen of Naples and Sicily, who was known as Charlotte in the family, Charles being the masculine version of her name. His younger sister, Sophie, was born a little over a year later. He became the Dauphin on the death of his elder brother, Louis Joseph, on 4 June 1789.

As was customary in royal families, Louis-Charles was cared for by multiple people. Queen Marie Antoinette appointed governesses to look after all three of her children. Louis-Charles' original governess was Yolande de Polastron, Duchess of Polignac, who left France on the night of 16–17 July 1789, at the outbreak of the Revolution, at the urging of Louis XVI. She was replaced by the marquise Louise Élisabeth de Tourzel. Additionally, the queen selected Agathe de Rambaud to be the official nurse of Louis-Charles. Alain Decaux wrote:

"Madame de Rambaud was officially in charge of the care of the prince from the day of his birth until 10 August 1792; in other words, for seven years. During these seven years, she never left him, she cradled him, took care of him, dressed him, comforted him, and scolded him. Many times, more than Marie Antoinette, she was a true mother for him".

Marie Antoinette reportedly retained her charisma after her pregnancies, cutting an imposing figure in her court. She was said to have many admirers, but remained a faithful, strong-willed wife and a stern but ultimately loving mother.

On 6 October 1789, the royal family was forced by a Parisian mob mostly composed of women to move from Versailles to the Tuileries Palace in Paris, where they spent the next three years as prisoners under the daily surveillance of the National Guards who did not spare any humiliation to the family; at that time Marie Antoinette was always surrounded by guards, even in her bedroom at night and these guards were present when the Queen was allowed to see her children.

The family lived a secluded life, and Marie Antoinette dedicated most of her time to her two children under the daily surveillance of the national guards who kept her hands behind her back and searched everybody from the Queen to the children to see if any letters were smuggled to the prisoner. In 1790, the queen adopted a foster sibling for him, "Zoë" Jeanne Louise Victoire, as a playmate. On 21 June 1791, the family tried to escape in what is known as the Flight to Varennes, during which Louis-Charles was disguised as a girl, but the attempt failed. After the family was recognized, they were brought back to Paris. The blinds on their carriage were drawn back at the orders of a following crowd, exposing them all to the suffocating heat and dust. After killing a man who saluted the king, the mob taunted the family with his hat and clothing. On the second night of their journey home, the family was forced to walk through the unpredictable mob to reach their accommodation, many of whom openly threatened to kill them. As they arrived back at the palace, somebody attempted to attack Marie Antoinette, so Louis-Charles was snatched from her and whisked to safety by officials. That night, the young boy was awoken by nightmares of being eaten alive by wolves.

When the Tuileries Palace was stormed by an armed mob on 10 August 1792, the royal family sought refuge at the Legislative Assembly. They were forced to stay in a room ten feet long with a barred window facing the public gallery. Throughout the first nights of their stay, hundreds were murdered, stomped upon and set aflame. The family's possessions, jewels and the heads of their supporters were paraded before them, and they are made to watch men dying of their wounds. They had nothing to eat or drink for two days. During this, Louis-Charles spent a great deal of time clinging to his mother.

On 13 August, the royal family was imprisoned in the tower of the Temple. At first, their conditions were not extremely harsh, but they were prisoners and were re-styled as the "Capets" by the newborn Republic. Louis-Charles had toys and games to play with and was tutored in mathematics, literature, history and geography by his father. He was recorded by family members and even his captors as having a remarkable memory, being able to recite lengthy passages from novels and scripture on command. However, his education was cut short when the ever-suspicious guards ordered that all pencils, paper and ink be taken from the family to prevent secret correspondence. Louis-Charles was also prevented from learning maths when one guard claimed the king was, in fact, using the multiplication table to teach his son to write in cipher.

On 11 December, at the beginning of his trial, Louis XVI was separated from his family. He knew he was to be imminently taken away that morning, but even through his nerves could not refuse Louis-Charles' request to play nine-pins. Louis-Charles lost all the games, and after his father was taken away, slept in his mother's bed while she sat awake. Marie Antoinette and her children were permitted to see the king only one last time before his execution.

=== Naming ===
At his birth, Louis-Charles, a Fils de France ("Son of France"), was given the title of Duke of Normandy, and, on 4 June 1789, when Louis Joseph, Dauphin of France, his elder brother, died, the four-year-old became Dauphin of France, a title he held until September 1791, when France became a constitutional monarchy. Under the new constitution, the heir-apparent to the throne of France, formerly referred to as the "Dauphin", was restyled the Prince Royal. Louis-Charles held that title until the fall of the monarchy on 21 September 1792. At the death of his father on 21 January 1793, royalists and foreign powers intent on restoring the monarchy held him to be the new king of France, with the title of Louis XVII. From his exile in Hamm, in today's North Rhine-Westphalia, his uncle, the Count of Provence and future Louis XVIII, who had emigrated on 21 June 1791, appointed himself Regent for the young imprisoned king.

=== Prison and rumours of escape ===
==== 1793: In the care of Antoine Simon ====
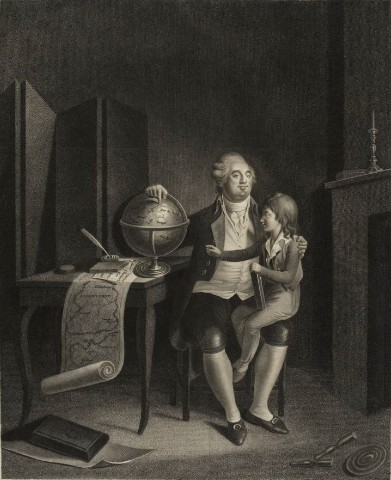
Louis XVI taking care of the education of his son in the Temple, (Musée de la Révolution française)

Immediately following Louis XVI's execution, plots were hatched for the escape of the prisoners from the Temple, the chief of these plots were engineered by the Chevalier de Jarjayes, the Baron de Batz, and Lady Atkyns. Others said to be involved in his escape(s) are Paul Barras and Joséphine de Beauharnais.

On the night of 3 July, Louis-Charles was suddenly awoken and separated from his mother. The two of them begged and cried, Marie Antoinette fiercely trying to protect her son, but was forced to give him up under threat of death to them all. The boy was put in the care of Antoine Simon, a cobbler who had been named his guardian by the Committee of Public Safety. Louis-Charles' sister, Marie Thérèse, wrote in her memoires about the "monster Simon", as did Alcide Beauchesne. Stories survive narrating how Louis-Charles was made to copy the revolutionaries; his blond curls were cut short, and he was dressed in a red cap and jacket and made to loudly sing revolutionary songs, which his mother and sister could hear in their room upstairs. He was forced to eat and drink to excess and use foul language, to read inappropriate books or ballads, to swear oaths against God and use derogatory language towards his surviving family. Simon referred to the boy as 'Charles Capet', or more commonly, 'wolf-cub.' He would be hit, kicked, woken several times a night and doused with cold water if he prayed. He was taken daily into the garden and was occasionally permitted to play with the laundry woman's daughter. He still had some toys and, after expressing a desire for birds, was even briefly allowed a flock of canaries. Marie-Jeanne, Simon's wife, often tried to protect the boy from her husband's rage, but did not stop Louis-Charles from serving her at the table and had the boy polish her shoes.

The foreign secretaries of Britain and Spain also heard accounts from their spies that the boy was raped by prostitutes in order to infect him with venereal diseases to supply the Commune with manufactured "evidence" against the Queen. However, the scenes related by Alcide de Beauchesne of the physical torment of the child are not supported by any testimony, though he was at this time seen by a great number of people.

On 6 October, Pache, Chaumette, Jacques Hébert and others visited the boy, who was drunk on liquor, and secured his signature to charges of sexual molestation against his mother and his aunt. The next day he met his elder sister Marie-Thérèse-Charlotte for the last time.

==== 1794: Illness ====
On 19 January 1794, the Simons left the Temple, after securing a receipt for the safe transfer of their ward, who was declared to be in good health. It seems that the committee did not attempt to find another guardian for him. A large part of the Temple records from that time onward disappeared under the Bourbon Restoration, making ascertaining of the facts impossible. Two days after the departure of the Simons, Louis-Charles is said by the Restoration historians to have been moved into a damp, dark room that was bolted and barricaded like the cage of a wild animal. He had a bed of straw, no lavatory, no way of staying clean and no ways to occupy himself. The story recounts that food was passed through the bars to the boy, who survived despite the accumulated filth of him and his surroundings. He seldom even saw the hands of the guards, who were changed day to day and only ever spoke to him to ensure he was alive. The boy grew pale and thin, his back stooped, limbs clad with sores and hair and nails uncut. A cook was once permitted to ask Louis-Charles why he was not eating, as he had not touched his food in three days and was leaving it to the vermin. He is recorded as having said, "Well, what would you do, my friend? I want to die."

Maximilien Robespierre visited Marie-Thérèse on 11 May, but no one, according to the legend, entered the boy's room for six months until Paul Barras visited the prison when he was appointed the children's guard after the 9th Thermidor (27 July 1794). He found Louis-Charles curled up in a small cradle-like cot, so still the man assumed he was asleep. Upon being asked why he was in the cot, the boy said it was less painful than his bed. Barras raised the boy to stand, but he immediately collapsed and was clearly in great pain. His trousers, which he had outgrown, were cut open, revealing his swollen knees.

Barras's account of the visit describes the child as suffering from extreme neglect, but conveys no idea of the alleged walling-in. He scolded the Commissioners for their neglect and demanded that Louis-Charles and his room be cleaned and that the boy be seen by a doctor. Eventually these requests were granted, and the boy was visited by his new attendant, Jean Jacques Christophe Laurent (1770–1807), a creole from Martinique. From 9 November onward, Laurent had assistance from a man named Gomin. The latter had lights placed in the boy's room and ensured that he be able to take frequent walks along the roof of the Tower. It is said that during one of his first walks, Louis-Charles picked flowers from the parapet and made a nosegay for his mother, which he left outside her room, as nobody had told him she had been killed. The child's new room was bigger and cleaner, with visible daylight and a proper bed. His new attendants called him 'Monsieur Charles' and were kind to him, providing him with books, potted plants and board games like those he had played while imprisoned with his family. He was a little happier under these humane conditions, but still depressed, seldom speaking and continuing to lament that he was not allowed to see his mother or sister.

The boy's great fondness of birds still lingered. As his health began to decline, he would be carried up to the roof for fresh air, and would now sit and watch the sparrows who came to drink from a rainwater basin. He called them "my birds" and delighted in the fact that they would not fly away when he got close. Gomin also obtained him a turtle dove, although it did not live long.

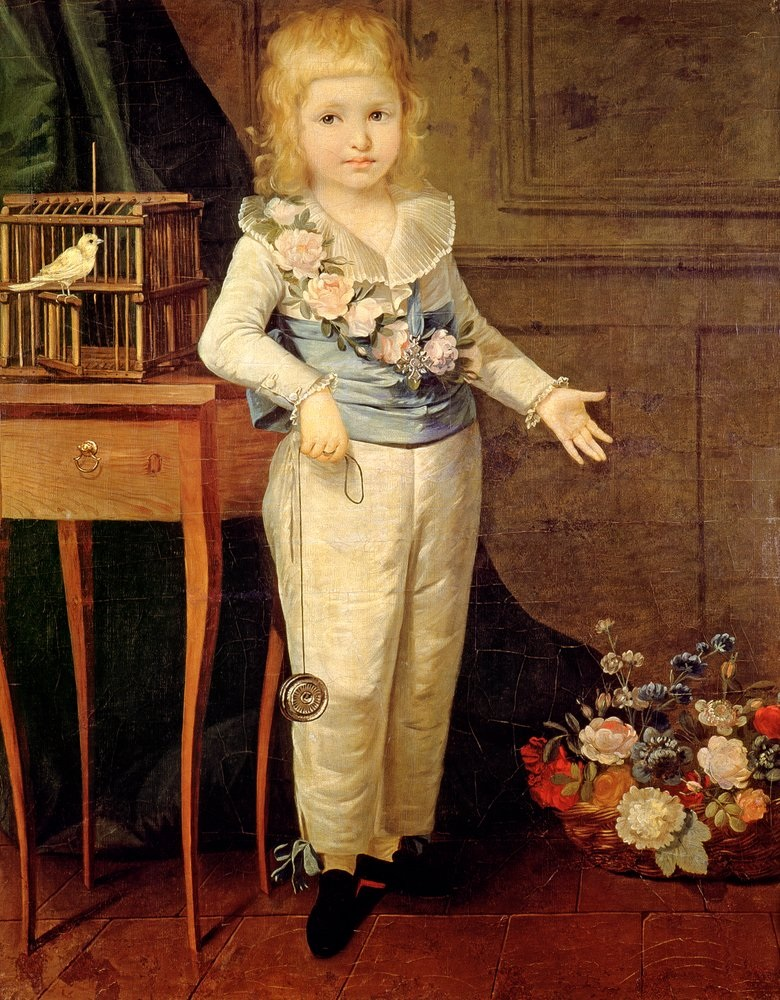
Louis Charles by Élisabeth Louise Vigée Le Brun

From about the time of Gomin's arrival, he was inspected, not by delegates of the Commune, but by representatives of the civil committee of the 48 sections of Paris. From the end of October onward, the child maintained silence, explained by Laurent as a determination taken on the day he made his deposition against his mother. On 19 December 1794, he was visited by three commissioners from the Committee of Public Safety — Jean-Baptiste Harmand, Jean-Baptiste Charles Matthieu and Jacques Reverchon . They bargained with him for an hour, offering him longer walks on the roof and an array of pets and toys, but they failed to get the boy to say anything at all.

==== 1795: Death ====
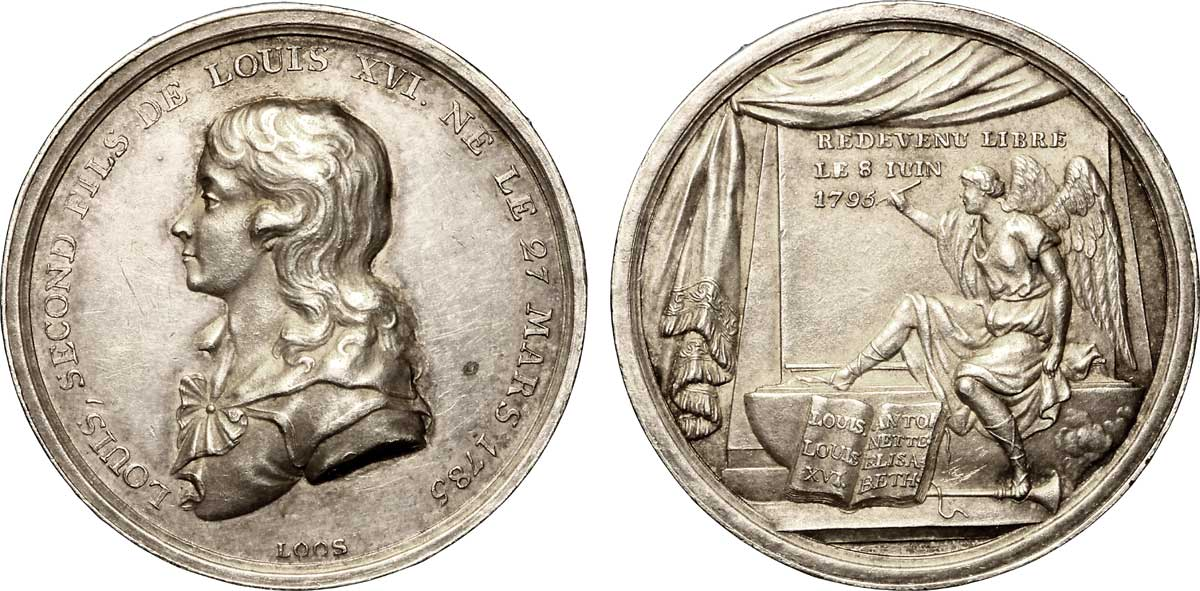
Louis XVII

On 31 March 1795, Étienne Lasne was appointed to be the child's guardian in place of Laurent. In May that year the boy was seriously ill, and a doctor, P. J. Desault, who had visited him seven months earlier, was summoned. He pointed out the great delay before he was summoned. He provided lotions for Louis-Charles' tumors and swollen knees, and suggested the boy be taken to the country for healthy air. The latter action was not taken.

Desault returned each day at 9:00 a.m. to ensure the child was being treated correctly, and took it upon himself to bring Louis-Charles for his daily walks. He extended each visit for as long as he could, pitying the ill boy and enjoying his company. Despite his silence, Louis-Charles once gathered the strength to thank him for his kindness.

However, on 1 June, Desault himself died suddenly, not without suspicion of poison. Louis-Charles continued to wait for him at 9:00 the following morning and was dismayed to find out what had happened. It was some days before doctors Philippe-Jean Pelletan and Jean-Baptiste Dumangin were called, and by this time, the boy could hardly move his limbs without assistance. To distract him from the pain, Gomin and Lasne took to playing games and singing songs, the latter playing the violin.

On 6 June 1795, Pelletan observed that the child's limbs were wasted, his stomach was enlarged and he had chronic diarrhoea. He had the boy moved to the keeper's lodge, an airy room in the Tower with a large window.

Throughout the night and the following morning, Louis-Charles was violently sick, falling weaker still and suffering a fainting fit. He was given sweetened water and a request for medicine was sent. Later that evening, however, his condition deteriorated further. When Gomin came to see him that night, the child was crying. He wailed that he was "always alone" and that his mother was still locked up in the other Tower; he had still not been told of Marie Antoinette's death.

It is reported that the following morning, Louis-Charles began to hallucinate music coming from above, along with his mother's voice. This continued throughout the day as Gomin goes to the Committee to ask for a nurse. Alone with Lasne, he began to slip into unconsciousness. He was given some medicine but began to sweat profusely, his breathing growing laboured. "Do you think my sister could hear the music?" Louis-Charles asked. "It would make her so happy. I have something to tell you." These were his last words.

Louis-Charles died on 8 June 1795. Two days later, his body was carried away in a child's coffin, and an autopsy was conducted. The professor Jeanroy claimed that "in more than forty years' exercise in his art, he had never seen the brain so well-developed in a child that age." Tumors and growths of various sizes were found in his intestines and lungs.

In the report it was stated that a child apparently about 10 years of age, "which the commissioners told us was the late Louis Capet's son", had died of a scrofulous infection of long standing. "Scrofula" as it was previously known, is nowadays called tuberculous cervical lymphadenitis, referring to a lymphadenitis (chronic lymph node swelling or infection) of the neck (cervical lymph nodes) associated with tuberculosis. During the autopsy, the physician Pelletan was shocked to see the countless scars which covered the boy's body, evidently the result of the physical mistreatment which the child had suffered while imprisoned in the Temple.

Louis-Charles was buried on 10 June in the Sainte Marguerite cemetery, but no stone was erected to mark the spot. A skull was found there in 1846 and identified as his, though later re-examination in 1893 showed it to be from a teenager and therefore unlikely to be his.

==== Heart of Louis-Charles ====
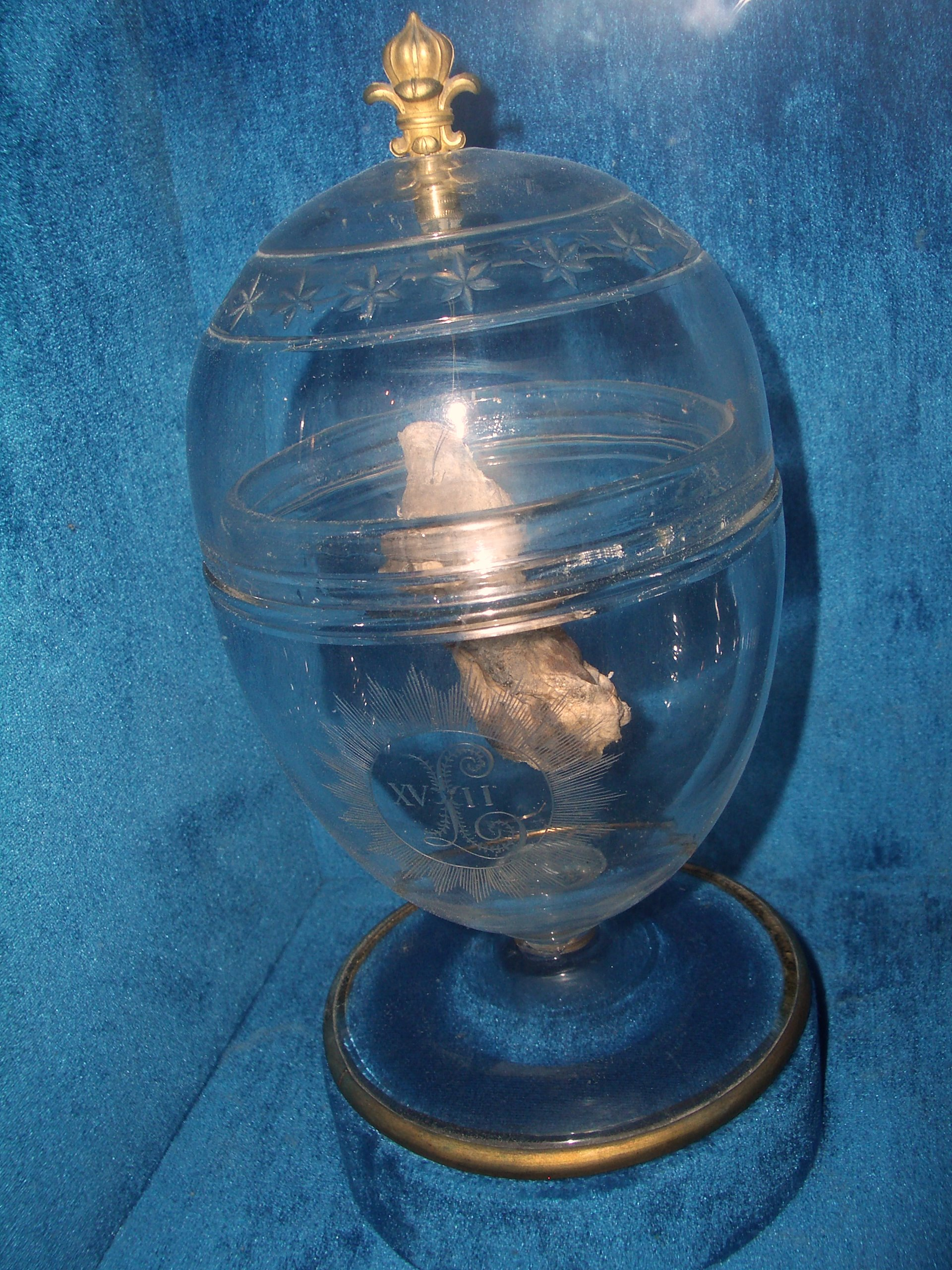
Heart of Louis XVII inside a crystal urn, now buried at St Denis

Following a tradition of preserving royal hearts, Louis-Charles's heart was removed and smuggled out during the autopsy by the overseeing physician, Philippe-Jean Pelletan. Thus, Louis-Charles' heart was not interred with the rest of the body. Dr. Pelletan stored the smuggled heart in distilled wine in order to preserve it. However, after 8 to 10 years the distilled wine had evaporated, and the heart was from that time kept dry.

After the Restoration in 1815, Dr. Pelletan attempted to give the heart to Louis-Charles's uncle, Louis XVIII; the latter refused because he could not bring himself to believe that it was the heart of his nephew. Dr. Pelletan then donated the heart to the Archbishop of Paris, Hyacinthe-Louis de Quélen. Following the Revolution of 1830, and the plundering of the Archbishop's Palace of Paris, Pelletan's son Philippe-Gabriel found the relic among the ruins and placed it in the crystal urn in which it is still kept today. After the younger Pelletan's death in 1879, it passed to Édouard Dumont.

It was later offered to Carlos, Duke of Madrid in 1895, a pretender to the throne of France and Spain, nephew (both biological and in-law) of the Archduchess Maria Theresa of Austria-Este. The offer was accepted and the relic was held near Vienna at Schloss Frohsdorf. In 1909, Carlos's son, Jaime, Duke of Madrid, inherited the heart, and gave it to his sister, Beatriz de Borbón (1874–1961), wife of Prince Fabrizio Massimo (1868–1944), and in 1938, to their daughter Maria della Neve, wife of Charles Piercy.

Finally Maria della Neve offered the heart to Jacques de Bauffremont, president of the Memorial of the Basilica of St Denis in Paris. He in turn put the heart and its crystal urn in the basilica's necropolis of the Kings of France, the burial place of Louis-Charles's parents and other members of the French royal family. There it rested undisturbed until December 1999, when public notaries witnessed the removal of a section of the muscle of the heart's aorta and its transfer into a sealed envelope, and subsequently the opening of the same sealed envelope in the laboratory for it to be tested.

It was in 2000 that the historian Philippe Delorme arranged for DNA testing of the heart as well as bone samples from one of the many historical claimants to Louis-Charles's identity, namely Karl Wilhelm Naundorff, a German clockmaker. Ernst Brinkmann of Münster University and Belgian genetics professor Jean-Jacques Cassiman of the Katholieke Universiteit Leuven, conducted mitochondrial DNA tests using a strand of the hair of the boy's mother, Marie Antoinette, and other samples from her sisters Maria Johanna Gabriela and Maria Josepha, their mother, Empress Maria Theresa, and two living direct descendants in the strict maternal line of Maria Theresa, namely Queen Anne of Romania and her brother, Prince André of Bourbon-Parma, maternal relatives of Louis XVII. The tests proved both that Naundorff was not the dauphin, and the heart was that of Louis-Charles.

Of these results, historian Jean Tulard wrote: "This [mummified] heart is ... almost certainly that of Louis XVII. We can never be 100 per cent sure but this is about as sure as it gets".

In the light of this conclusion, French Legitimists organized the heart's solemn burial in the Basilica of St Denis on 8 June 2004. The burial took place in connection with a mass and during the ceremony 12-year-old Prince Amaury of Bourbon-Parma carried the heart and placed it in a niche beside the tombs of Louis-Charles' parents, Louis XVI and Marie-Antoinette. It was the first time in over a century that a royal ceremony had taken place in France, complete with the fleur-de-lis standard and a royal crown.

== Lost Dauphin claimants ==
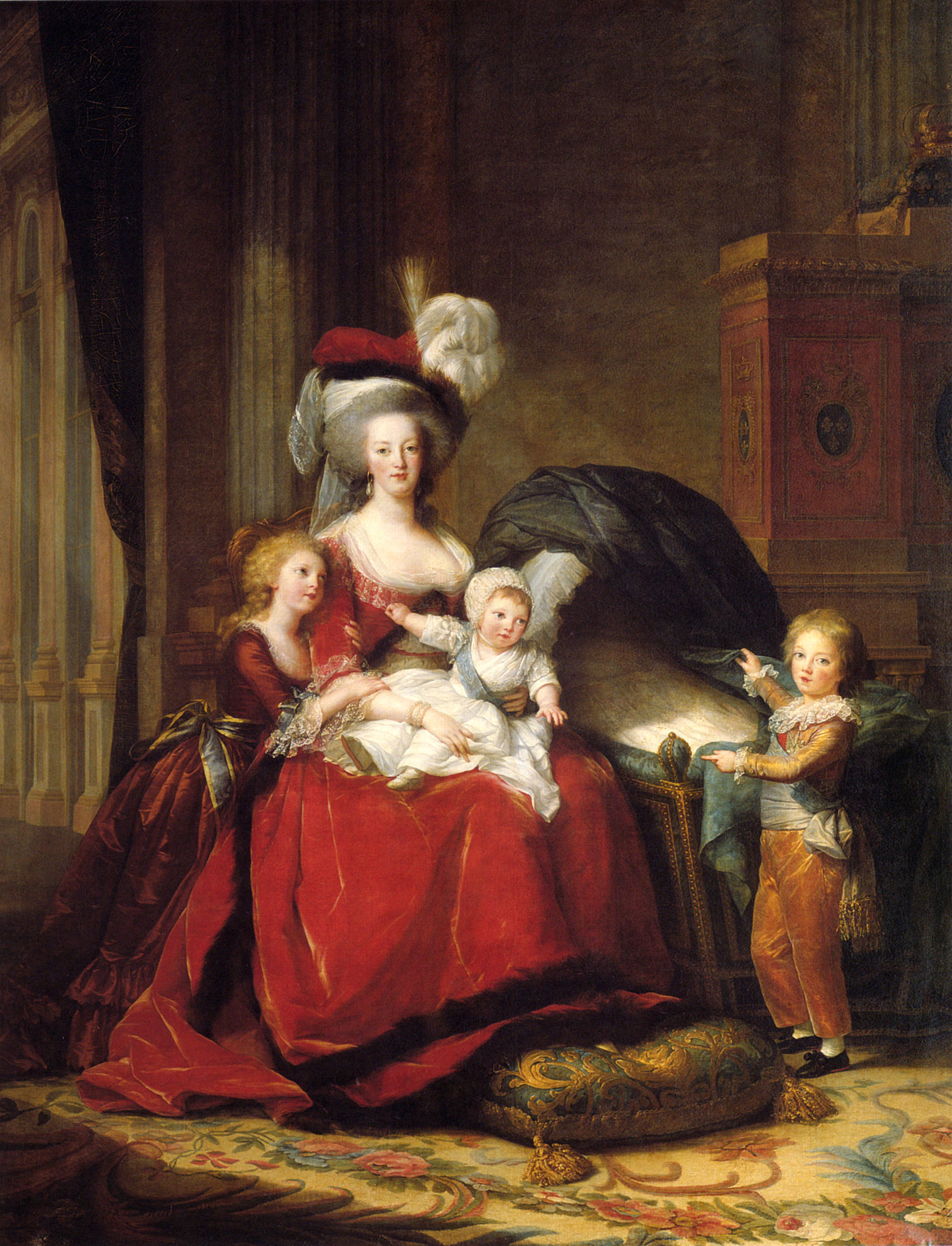
The Royal Family of France, 1787
Marie Antoinette and Her Children, 1787 at Versailles (L-R): Marie-Thérèse Charlotte, known as Madame Royale at court; the Queen with the Duke of Normandy on her lap; the Dauphin on the right pointing into an empty cradle that originally held Madame Sophie, who died later in the year and had to be painted out. By Élisabeth Louise Vigée Le Brun; the Fleur-de-lis of France and the Bourbons can be seen on the cabinet, behind the cradle.

As rumors quickly spread that the body buried was not that of Louis-Charles and that he had been spirited away alive by sympathizers, the legend of the "Lost Dauphin" was born. When the Bourbon monarchy was restored in 1814, some one hundred claimants came forward. Would-be royal heirs continued to appear across Europe for decades afterward.

=== Naundorff ===
Karl Wilhelm Naundorff was a German clockmaker whose story rested on a series of complicated intrigues. According to him, Paul Barras determined to save the Dauphin in order to please Joséphine de Beauharnais, the future empress, having conceived the idea of using the Dauphin's existence as a means of dominating the comte de Provence in the event of a restoration. The Dauphin was concealed in the fourth storey of the Tower, a wooden figure being substituted for him. Laurent, to protect himself from the consequences of the substitution, replaced the wooden figure with a deaf mute, who was presently exchanged for the scrofulous child of the death certificate. The deaf mute was also concealed in the Temple. It was not the dead child, but the Dauphin who left the prison in the coffin, to be retrieved by friends before it reached the cemetery.

Naundorff arrived in Berlin in 1810, with papers giving the name Karl Wilhelm Naundorff. He said he was escaping persecution and settled at Spandau in 1812 as a clockmaker, marrying Johanna Einert in 1818. In 1822 he removed to Brandenburg an der Havel, and in 1828 to Crossen, near Frankfurt (Oder). He was imprisoned from 1825 to 1828 for coining, though apparently on insufficient evidence, and in 1833 came to push his claims in Paris, where he was recognized as the Dauphin by many persons formerly connected with the court of Louis XVI. Expelled from France in 1836, the day after bringing a suit against Marie Thérèse, Duchess of Angoulême for the restitution of the Dauphin's private property, he lived in exile until his death at Delft on 10 August 1845, and his tomb was inscribed "Louis XVII., roi de France et de Navarre (Charles Louis, duc de Normandie)". The Dutch authorities who had inscribed on his death certificate the name of Charles Louis de Bourbon, duc de Normandie (Louis XVII) permitted his son to bear the name de Bourbon, and when the family appealed in 1850–51, and again in 1874, for the restitution of their civil rights as heirs of Louis XVI, no less an advocate than Jules Favre pled their cause.

However, DNA testing conducted in 1993 proved that Naundorff was not the Dauphin.

=== Richemont ===
Baron de Richemont's tale that Jeanne Simon, who was genuinely attached to him, smuggled him out in a basket, is simple and more credible, and does not necessarily invalidate the story of the subsequent operations with the deaf mute and the scrofulous patient, Laurent in that case being deceived from the beginning, but it renders them extremely unlikely. Richemont, alias Henri Éthelbert-Louis-Hector Hébert, began to put forward his claims in Paris in 1828. He died in 1853.

=== Williams ===
Reverend Eleazer Williams was a Protestant missionary from Wisconsin of Mohawk Native American descent. While at the house Francis Vinton, William began shaking and trembling upon seeing a portrait of Antoine Simon, a member of the sans-culottes, saying of the portrait that it had "haunted me, day, and night, as long as I can remember." Simon was rumored to have physically abused the Dauphin while he was imprisoned at the Temple. Francis Vinton was convinced by Eleazar William's reaction that Williams was Louis-Charles. Williams claimed he had no recollection of how he escaped his imprisonment at the Temple, or of his early years in France.

Williams was a missionary to Native Americans when, according to him, the prince de Joinville, son of Louis-Philippe, met him, and after some conversation asked him to sign a document abdicating his rights in favor of Louis-Philippe, in return for which he, the Dauphin (alias Eleazar Williams), was to receive the private inheritance which was his. This Eleazar Williams refused. Williams's story is generally regarded as false. However, other elements published in 1897 provide some grounds for doubt.

== Reevaluations by modern historians ==
Louis XVII dans la Tour du Temple by Gustave Wappers. A19th-century depiction of the young Dauphin in rags and isolation.

The death of Louis XVII, officially attributed to scrofulous tuberculosis on 8 June 1795, remains one of the most contested events of the French Revolution. While the official records present a sanitized version of his demise, numerous contemporaneous accounts and modern investigations suggest that the boy endured prolonged psychological and physical torment tantamount to martyrdom. Following the execution of his father Louis XVI in January 1793 and his mother Marie Antoinette in October of the same year, the young prince was declared by royalists as Louis XVII.

In July 1793, he was forcibly separated from his family and placed in the care of Antoine Simon, a cobbler appointed by the Committee of Public Safety. There, Louis-Charles was subjected to forced intoxication, coercion, and alleged physical abuse designed to extract false testimony against his mother.

After Simon’s departure in January 1794, the child was left in complete isolation in a sealed cell of the Temple Tower, often in darkness, with no education, no hygiene, and only the most basic sustenance. Multiple witnesses, including guards who later testified, reported that the child was left for months without clean clothes or any meaningful human contact. Vermin infested his cell, and his own excrement accumulated in corners of the room. He was no longer able to walk due to joint contractures and festering sores, and he reportedly spoke rarely, having suffered severe psychological deterioration. Eyewitnesses described him as ghostlike, covered in scabs, ulcers, and filth, with one guard calling him "a corpse who breathed."

On 8 June 1795, after two years of increasing physical decay, Louis XVII died in his cell at the age of 10. His autopsy was performed the following day by four physicians, including Philippe-Jean Pelletan. The report cited tuberculosis and gastric inflammation as causes of death, but notably lacked a full description of his physical condition. No formal identification of the body was made. Pelletan removed and preserved the heart, later identified in the 2000s by mitochondrial DNA analysis as being consistent with the maternal lineage of Marie Antoinette. This analysis, comparing the DNA of the heart with authenticated samples from Marie Antoinette’s family, confirmed that the boy who died in the Temple Tower was indeed her biological son, Louis-Charles.

However, the rest of the body was buried without ceremony in a mass grave. When remains believed to be his were exhumed in 1846 from the Sainte-Marguerite cemetery, forensic analysis revealed they belonged to a person aged 18–20 years — not a child. Later studies showed the skeleton included bones from multiple individuals. Thus, while the heart’s provenance has been confirmed, the boy’s full remains have likely been lost.

The absence of formal recognition, the vague autopsy, and the rapid burial have fueled widespread criticism that the revolutionary authorities sought to obscure the true extent of his suffering and avoid accountability. Modern scholars such as Deborah Cadbury and Jean Tulard have described his treatment as institutionalized child abuse, with some characterizing him as a political child martyr. Louis XVII's story continues to resonate in French historical memory as a symbol of innocence caught in ideological conflict. Although no monument marks his true grave, his fate is often cited in scholarly and cultural discussions as an example of the human cost of political fanaticism and the silent tragedies that can be obscured during periods of radical change.

== In fiction ==
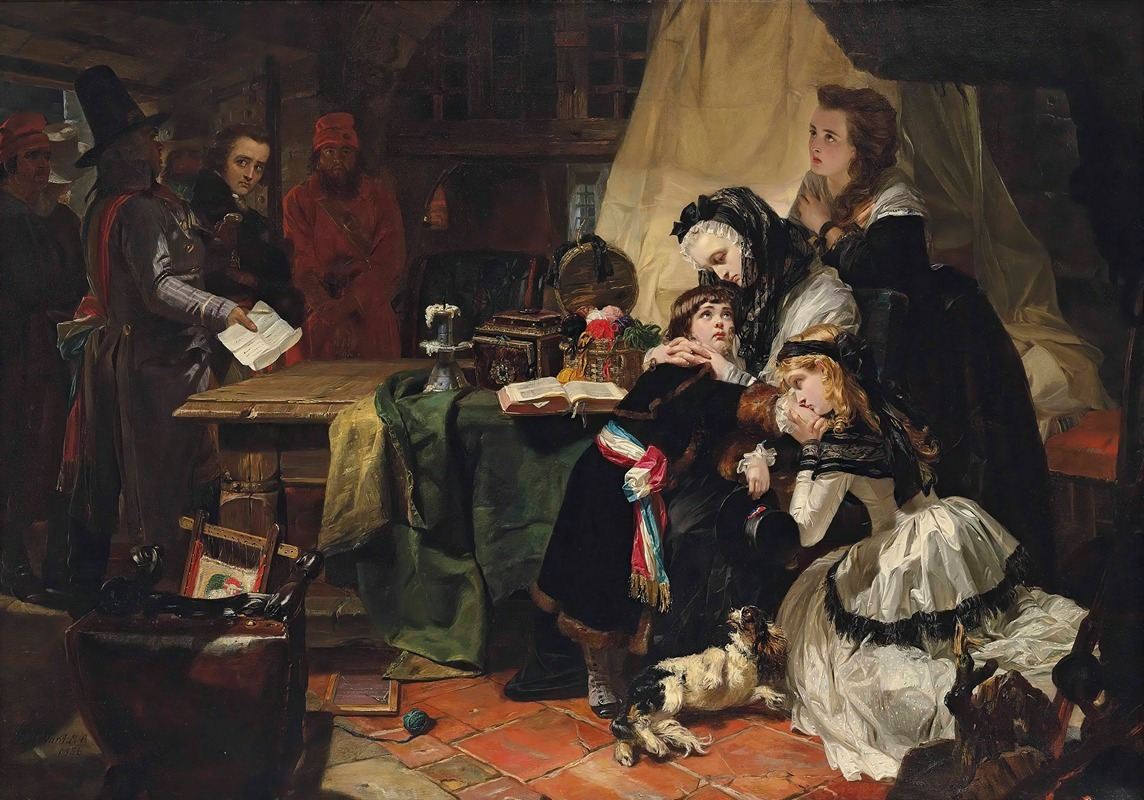
The Last Parting of Marie Antoinette and Her Son by Edward Matthew Ward, 1856

=== Novel ===
- 1884 – Mark Twain, Adventures of Huckleberry Finn, ISBN 9780486280615 (a character falsely claiming to be him)
- 1913 – Baroness Emmuska Orczy, Eldorado, ISBN 9780755111121
- 1937 – Rafael Sabatini, The Lost King, ISBN 9780755115440
- 1951 – Dennis Wheatley, The Man Who Killed The King, ISBN 0090031903
- 1953 – Willa Gibbs, Seed of Mischief, ISBN 9780110500645
- 1955 – Carley Dawson, Dragon Run
- 2000 – Deborah Cadbury, The Lost King of France: A true story of revolution, revenge, and DNA, ISBN 9780312283124
- 2003 – Françoise Chandernagor, La Chambre, éditions Gallimard, ISBN 2070314200
- 2003 – Amélie de Bourbon Parme, Le Sacre de Louis XVII, éditions Folio, ISBN 9782070302284
- 2005 – Ann Dukthas, En Mémoire d'un prince, éditions 10/18, Grands Détectives, ISBN 2264037903
- 2007 – Christophe Donner, Un roi sans lendemain, éditions Grasset, ISBN 2246625815
- 2009 – Dominic Lagan, Live Free or Die, ISBN 0956151809
- 2010 – Jennifer Donnelly, Revolution, ISBN 9780385737647
- 2011 – Louis Bayard, The Black Tower, ISBN 9782266188906
- 2011 – Jacques Soppelsa, Louis XVII, la piste argentine, Histoires, A2C Médias, ISBN 9782916831169
- 2011 – Missouri Dalton, The Grave Watchers, ISBN 9781610402842

=== Cinema ===
- 1937 – Le roi sans couronne played by Scotty Beckett
- 1938 – La Marseillaise played by Marie-Pierre Sordet-Dantès
- 1938 – Marie Antoinette played by Scotty Beckett
- 1945 – Pamela played by Serge Emrich
- 1957 – Dangerous Exile played by Richard O'Sullivan
- 1982 – The Scarlet Pimpernel played by Richard Charles
- 1989 – La Révolution française played by Sean Flynn
- 1991 – Killer Tomatoes Eat France played by Steve Lundquist.
- 1995 – Jefferson in Paris played by Damien Groelle
- 2001 – The Affair of the Necklace played by Thomas Dodgson-Gates
- 2006 – Marie Antoinette played by Jago Betts, Axel Küng, Driss Hugo-Kalff

=== Music ===
- 2014 – Symphony of the Vampire by Kamijo
- 2018 – Sang by Kamijo

== See also ==
- Alexei Nikolaevich, heir to the Russian Empire; imprisoned and killed by the Bolsheviks in the Russian Civil War
- Arthur I, Duke of Brittany, boy claimant to the English throne; alleged to have been murdered by his uncle King John
- Edward V of England and Richard of Shrewsbury, Duke of York, the Princes in the Tower who vanished towards the end of the Wars of the Roses; alleged to have been murdered by their uncle Richard III

Louis XVII House of Bourbon Cadet branch of the Capetian dynasty Born: 27 March 1785 Died: 8 June 1795
French royalty
Preceded by Louis-Joseph	Dauphin of France; 4 June 1789 – 1 October 1791	Succeeded by Louis-Antoine
Titles in pretence
Preceded by Louis XVI	— TITULAR — King of France; 21 January 1793 – 8 June 1795; Reason for succession failure: Monarchy abolished in 1792	Succeeded by Louis XVIII
