= French ship Charmante =

At least four ships of the French navy were named Charmante :

- French frigate Charmante (1678)
- French frigate Charmante (1689)
- French frigate Charmante (1777), lead ship of the Charmante-class frigate, wrecked in 1780
- French brig Charmante (1828), in service 1828-1837
