= French ship Unité =

Unité has been the name of several ships in the French Navy including:

- French frigate Unité (1793) a Charmante-class frigate launched in 1787 as Gracieuse. Renamed Unité in 1793 and captured by the Royal Navy in 1796
- French corvette Unité (1794), launched in 1794 and captured by the Royal Navy in 1796 becoming HMS Surprise
