= Action of 24 February 1780 =

1780 naval battle

- Part of the American War of Independence and the Anglo-French War (1778–1783)
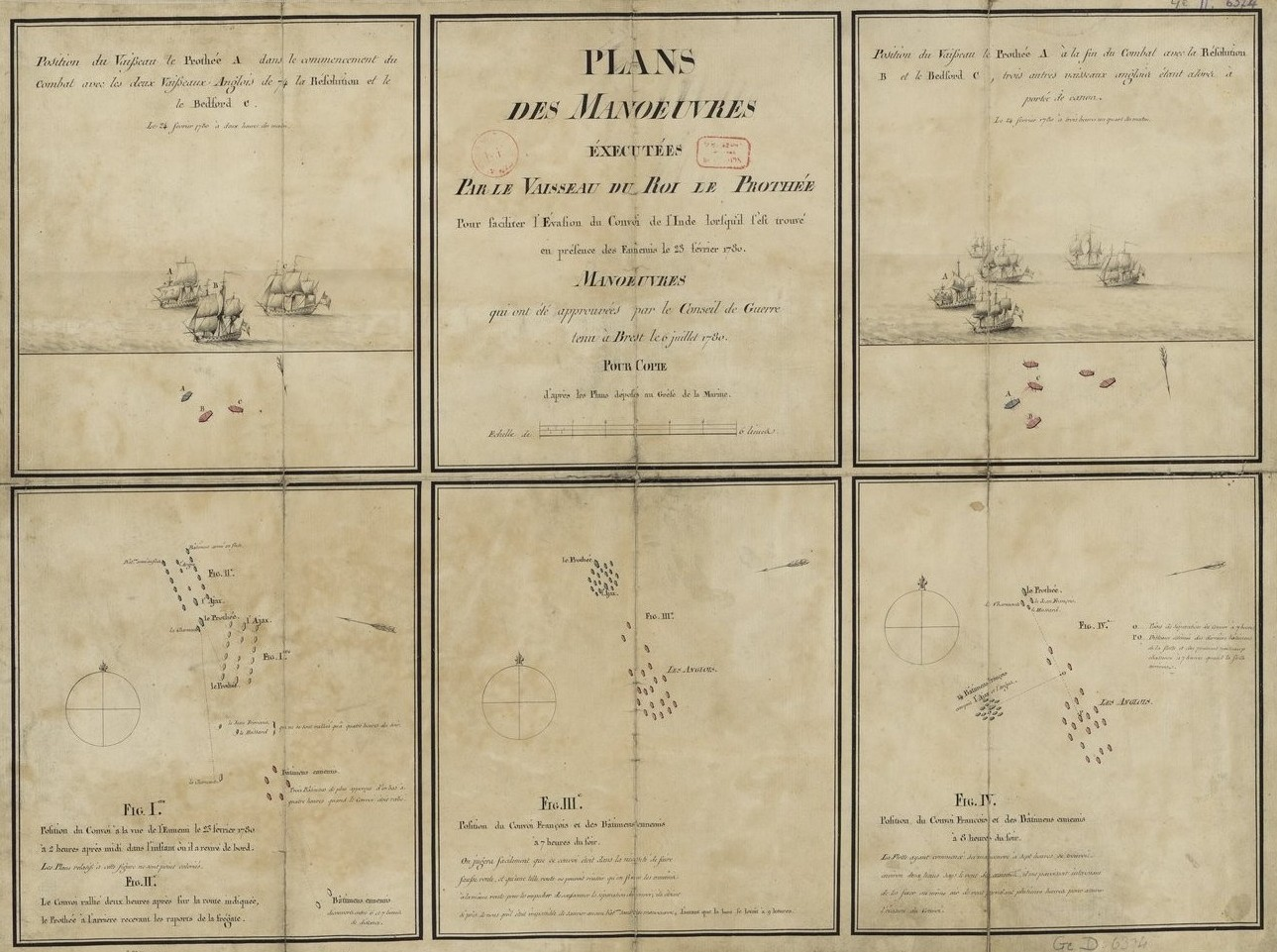
- Plan of the movements made by the French ship Prothée to protect its convoy while it is attacked by several English ships off Madeira on 24 February 1780
Date	24 February 1780
Location	Off Madeira
Result	British victory

Belligerents
Great Britain	France

Commanders and leaders
Robert Manners	Du Chilleau de La Roche

Strength
3 ships of the line	2 Ships of the line 2 Frigates; Convoy of 20 transports

Casualties and losses
Unknown	1 ship of the line captured, 3 transports captured & 1,000 prisoner of war

The action of 24 February 1780 was a minor naval battle that took place off the island of Madeira during the American Revolutionary War. A French convoy was intercepted and pursued by a British Royal Navy squadron ending with the French 64-gun ship Protée being captured along with three transports.

== Events ==
=== Background ===
In early 1780, the Royal Navy under Admiral George Rodney had defeated a Spanish fleet and subsequently relieved Gibraltar under siege by Spanish and French forces. Rodney then sailed for the West Indies in February, detaching part of the fleet for service in the English Channel.

On 16 February 1780, a French convoy with troops and ammunition bound for India departed Lorient escorted by the 64-gun ship of the line Protée with Ajax, Éléphant and Charmante. Protée, under Captain Du Chilleau de La Roche, was the flagship of the convoy.

=== Action ===
On 23 February, off the island of Madeira, the convoy met Rodney's fleet; Duchilleau ordered Ajax to double back with most of the convoy, while he would lure the British by continuing on the same bearing with Charmante and the smallest ships of the convoy. The British fleet chased Protée while Ajax escaped with the convoy; seeing the ships under his protection out of harm's way around 1am, Duchilleau tried to effect his own escape, but Protée caught the wind, breaking her tops and mizzen, allowing HMS Resolution, under Lord Robert Manners, to catch on around 2am, soon joined by the 74-gun HMS Bedford and HMS Marlborough.

Hopelessly outnumbered and out-gunned, Protée struck while Charmante returned to Lorient, arriving there on 3 March. Three merchantmen were also captured.

=== Aftermath ===
Court-martialled for the loss of his ship, Du Chilleau was honourably acquitted.

For the British the booty was substantial, as well as the three transports, Protée was carrying £60,000 worth of silver with the prize money subsequently shared.

Protée was commissioned in the Royal Navy as the third rate HMS Prothee.
