= Agathe de Rambaud =

French royal nurse

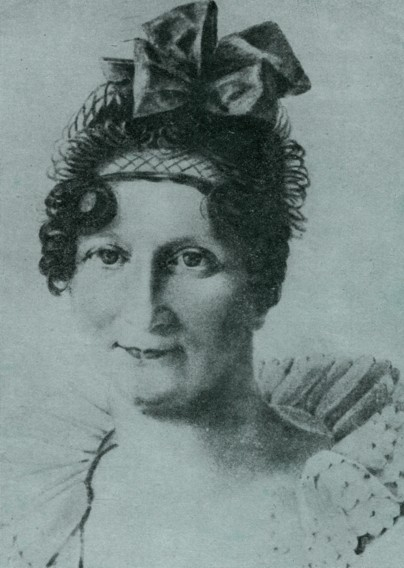
Agathe de Rambaud.

Agathe de Rambaud was the official nurse of the royal children, and particularly was in charge of the Dauphin from 1785 to 1792. She was born in Versailles as Agathe-Rosalie Mottet and was baptized in the future cathedral Saint-Louis of Versailles, on 10 December 1764. She died in Aramon, in the département of Gard, on 19 October 1853.

== Before the French Revolution ==
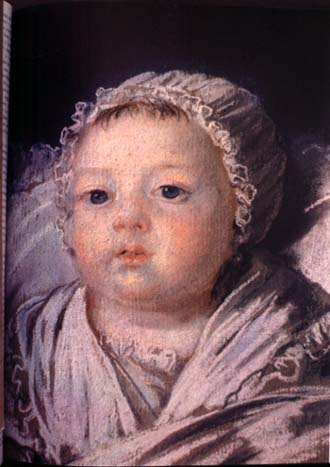
The Duke of Normandy, who becomes the Dauphin, at the death of his elder brother Louis-Joseph, Dauphin of France.

Rambaud was born the daughter of Louis Melchior Mottet, Haut Commissaire of the French colonies, and of Jeanne Agathe Le Proux de La Rivière, who was the daughter of a First Commissioner of the French Navy . She was the granddaughter of the Baron Claude Nicolas Louis Mottet de La Motte, officer of the Royal Fox hunt, and the niece of Baron Benoît Mottet de La Fontaine, the last French Governor of Pondicherry. She was also related to Pierre-Jean-Baptiste Chaussard. She was sometimes given the courtesy title of Countess of Ribécourt.

She married André Rambaud, a member of the bourgeoisie of Marseille, Captain and Knight of the Order of Saint Louis, on 7 March 1785, in Versailles, at the church of Saint Louis. The witnesses of the bride were the French admiral Pierre André de Suffren and Louis Thomas Villaret de Joyeuse. This marriage made her the sister-in-law of Georges-René Pléville Le Pelley, the future admiral and minister of the French First Republic.

Auguste de Rambaud, their first child, was born on 11 January 1786 and baptized the following day at the Saint-Louis parish of Versailles. The godfather was his uncle Georges-René Pléville Le Pelley, Captain of the French Royal Navy, future admiral and minister of the Navy and the colonies under the Directoire. When Madeleine Célinie de Rambaud was born at Versailles on 29 July 1787, her father was no longer living with the family, as he had been named Commander of three forts and governor of the kingdom of Galam, for the Company of Senegal. In 1789, he was killed at Fort Saint-Joseph de Galam.

In 1785, Agathe de Rambaud was chosen by Queen Marie Antoinette to be the berceuse des enfants de France, the official nurse, of her second son Louis-Charles, Duke of Normandy, who became the Dauphin at the death of his elder brother Louis-Joseph, Dauphin of France in 1789. Of her relationship with Louis-Charles, Alain Decaux wrote:

Madame de Rambaud was officially in charge of the care of the Dauphin from the day of his birth until 10 August 1792, in other words for seven years. During these seven years, she never left him, she cradled him, took care of him, dressed him, comforted him, scolded him. Ten times, a hundred times, more than Marie Antoinette, she was a true mother for him.

== From the French Revolution to the First French Empire ==
Agathe de Rambaud fled the Palais des Tuileries during the Insurrection of 10 August 1792 with Jean-Baptiste Cléry, who speaks at length about her in his Journal de ce qui s'est passé à la tour du Temple pendant la captivité de Louis XVI (Journal about what took place in the Prison Temple during the imprisonment of Louis XVI). She escaped the palace and was given refuge by a Monseur le Dreux at a house nearby where Cléry, who had escaped the palace by jumping out of a window, was also hiding, and was escorted out of Paris to her parents in Versailles by Cléry the following day. They narrowly avoided prison at the Abbey of Saint Germain des Prés, where many prisoners were killed during the September massacres.

From the first days of the royal family's captivity, Rambaud asked in vain to serve at the Temple, where the young Dauphin and his parents and sister had been imprisoned. Though she did not flee the country, Rambaud, and some of her family, were forced into hiding because of her relationship with the royal family. After the Thermidorian Reaction, many of her friends and family, became incited by Freemasonry and new ideals, and zealously served the French First Republic, the French Consulate and the First French Empire. She herself becomes close to many ministers, some generals, the mayor of Toulouse, and the scientist Philippe-Isidore Picot de Lapeyrouse.

== Bourbon Restoration ==
Eventually, her son Auguste resigned from his post in the First French Empire, joined with allied forces loyal to Louis XVIII, and reached Compiègne on 29 March 1814. The family joined in the new regime, expecting a return to their previous station. Nevertheless, their expectations quickly disappeared as on 6 September 1815, Agathe obtained only a 1000 franc pension, from the King because of her previous official position as nurse of the Dauphin. Auguste, War Commissioner at Gand, was paid only half-salary. However, at Montfort-l'Amaury Agathe was able to reacquaint herself with Marie-Thérèse-Charlotte of France, Caroline Ferdinande Louise, duchesse de Berry, and Louise-Elisabeth, Marquise de Tourzel.

When Louis XVIII died, she was received at Court more frequently. Her granddaughter remembered seeing her grandmother talking with the Duchess of Angoulême, during the King’s visit to Naples, in 1827, at the castle, where Charles X, rested his hand upon our heads, asking each of us our age, he chatted a few moments with our grandmother and inquired about her interests.

She was received in Parisian genteel society as well, as a friend of Count Charles d'Hozier, Philippe-Louis-Marc-Antoine de Noailles, 1st duc de Mouchy, and the Duke Sosthene de La Rochefoucauld, who would write:

Madame de Rambaud was a very honourable lady. The persons the present Louis XVII was first interested in... were not able to face the testimony of a very honorable lady, formerly in the service of the Royal Family, and who testified that the person who had been introduced to her was, according to her perfect knowledge, the son of the august Marie- Antoinette.

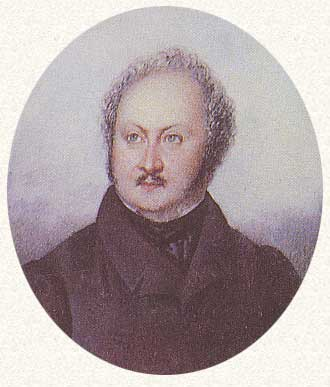
Charles Naundorff lives at Agathe de Rambaud's for more than a year. She receives in fact hundreds of persons among whom the former minister Étienne de Joly, important personalities who generally become partisans of Louis XVII, also called légitimistes.

== July Monarchy ==
The July Revolution had no negative consequences upon the life of Agathe de Rambaud. She was able to retain her 1000 franc pension due to her role as the "former lady of the chamber of the Dauphin, son of Louis XVI," and her daughter-in-law Thérèse Gaudelet de Rambaud, received a 600 franc pension as a "child of the former servants of the House of the King’s children." However, her son, realizing at Vendôme that his future in the army was nonexistent, left for India and later for Mexico City, where he died in 1834. After his death, Thérèse Gaudelet married the count Amédée d'Allonville, leaving Agathe to raise her grandchildren Ernest, who would study at École Polytechnique, and Ernestine.

As this was happening, Karl Wilhelm Naundorff came into her life, pretending to be the now adult Louis XVII. For over a year, he lived at her home as she questioned him at length, testing him with old keepsakes. She also verified his birthmarks which seemed identical to those she noted on the young Dauphin at the request of Marie Antoinette. She fought a long battle to attest to his rights, enduring searches of her home where police seized a number of documents, files, and even presents presented to her from the royal family.

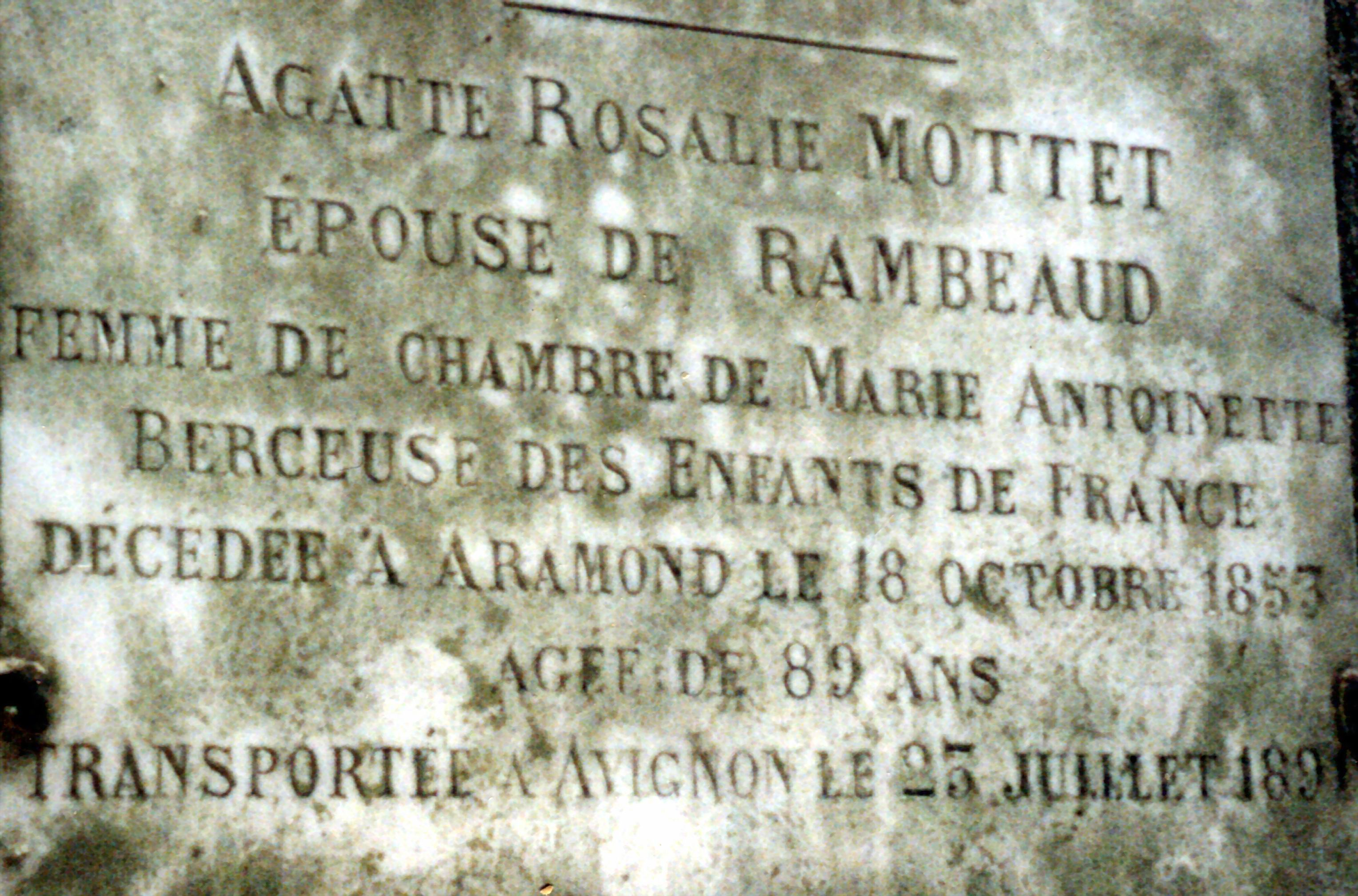
She was first buried at Aramon, then her body was transferred to the new family tomb at cemetery St.Véran in Avignon.

== Death ==
Agathe de Rambaud would eventually die at Aramon. She lived there for years at the home of her granddaughter's husband, rue Banasterie à Avignon, by the Palais des Papes.

She was first buried at Aramon, then her body was transferred to the new family tomb at St.Véran in Avignon,. A street in Avignon bears her maiden name of Agathe Rosalie Mottet and she is named among noted persons from Avignon at the town hall.
