= Georges René Le Peley de Pléville =

French Navy officer

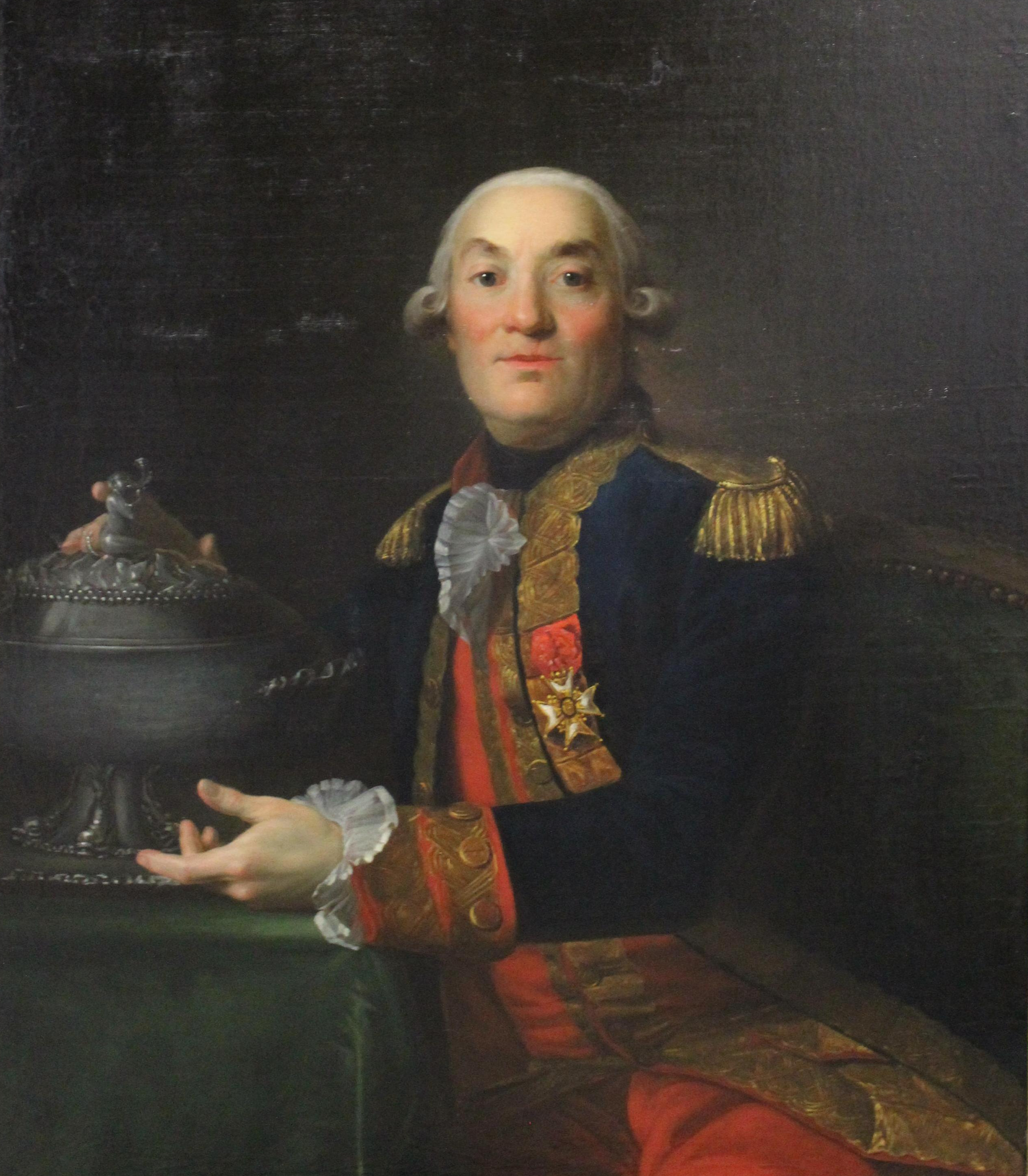
- Portrait of de Pléville by Francois Valentin Gazard
- Born: 29 June 1726; Granville, France
- Died: 2 October 1805 (aged 79); Paris, France
- Relatives: Agathe de Rambaud (sister in law); Pierre Dumanoir le Pelley (cousin)
- Military career
- Allegiance: Kingdom of France; French First Republic
- Branch: French Navy
- Service years: 1745–1798
- Rank: Vice admiral
- Commands: Governor of Marseille
- Conflicts: War of the Austrian Succession; First Battle of Cape Finisterre (1747) (POW); Seven Years' War; American Revolutionary Wars; French Revolutionary Wars
- Awards: senator (1799), commander of the Légion d’honneur

Vice-Admiral Georges-René Le Peley de Pléville (29 June 1726 – 2 October 1805) was a French Navy officer and politician who served as Minister of the Navy and the Colonies from 1797 to 1798. Starting his career at sea at a young age, he served in the War of the Austrian Succession both as a privateer and naval officer, being captured twice by the British. De Pléville continued to serve in the French navy during the Seven Years' War and American Revolutionary War. During the French Revolution, he transferred his loyalty to Revolutionary France and was allowed to continue his naval career. De Pléville retired from the French navy in 1799 and died in Paris six years later.

== Life ==
=== Origins and youth ===
He was born on 29 June 1726 in Granville. His father was Hervé Le Peley, seigneur de Pléville, a captain in the merchant navy, and his mother was the daughter of the seigneur du Saussey in the parish of Lingreville. Thus de Pléville was attracted to the sea and ships early in his life. Orphaned whilst very young, he ran away from the collège at Coutances to get himself engaged on a ship to Newfoundland in 1738. His uncle – intending him for the priesthood – asked the ship's captain to put de Pléville off life at sea. His first voyage as a pilotin was therefore particularly hard. At Newfoundland an old friend of his father welcomed him and treated him with more understanding. He thus went on many cod fishing voyages on different ships. He became an ensign from 1740 on the Ville de Québec, but objected to having been sent to the brig (ship's prison cell), which he deemed unjust. He deserted and fled whilst Ville de Québec was anchored on the coast of Canada. He walked alone for 50 days through the Canadian forest, meeting native tribes, before finally arriving in Quebec, where he was welcomed by a family that took pity on him. He embarked on another ship under a pseudonym as a helmsman and for the following years continued to work in Newfoundland.

=== War of the Austrian Succession ===
He entered the gardes de la marine but was too poor to remain there, so he was taken on by a small privateer sailing from Granville, the Françoise du Lac, as lieutenant. Some hours after leaving port, this boat was met in the lee of Jersey by two British privateers and crushed between their cannons' cross-fire. de Pléville was wounded in this 6 hour long battle, losing his right leg and finally being captured. Welcomed to Falmouth like a son by the family of an employee of the British Admiralty, he was cared for there and learned English until he was exchanged for a British prisoner of war.

De Pléville then served in the French Navy as frigate lieutenant on the 46-gun Argonaute, commanded by Tilly Le Pelley, another uncle, then on the ship Mercure, which was part of the 1746 Duc d'Anville expedition under the Duke of Anville which planned to recapture Cape Breton Island. The expedition was met on its return from Chebucto by Admiral George Anson and in the ensuing First Battle of Cape Finisterre a cannonball carried away de Pléville's wooden leg (de Pléville joked to his captain "That cannonball was mistaken – it only made work for the carpenter." or, in the original French, "Le boulet s'est trompé – il n'a donné de besogne qu'au charpentier") and he was once again taken prisoner.

On his release, he started serving on another privateer. He was second officer on the Comte de Noailles, on which he was yet again taken prisoner, though he managed to escape shortly before the end of the war. He then became second officer on a smuggling vessel working along the coast of England then, as captain, for four years again on a Newfoundland fishing vessel. In 1757 de Pléville married Marie Ursule de Rambaud in Marseille, and the couple had four children. Marie Ursule was the daughter of Jean Rambaud (a privateer captain, ship-owner and foreign merchant), with the marriage thus making de Pléville brother-in-law to Agathe de Rambaud.

=== Seven Years' War ===
His ship, Brillant, was requisitioned as a troop transport for the 1756 expedition to Menorca and then for the operations on Corsica. He commanded the privateer corvette Colibri, belonging to his father-in-law, informing the French navy of the movements of British vessels. Having been in many close combats, he and the Colibri were integrated into the Clue squadron in 1758 at Martinique. From 1758 to 1762, he commanded a small ship of the French Navy, the Hirondelle, with which he seized three East India Company ships. During one of these battles, he again lost his wooden leg. Health problems forced him to take up posts on land in the following years, including lieutenant de vaisseau and capitaine of the port of Martinique from 1763, writing a treatise on masts and making improvements to the roads on the Antilles.

=== Governor of the port of Marseille ===
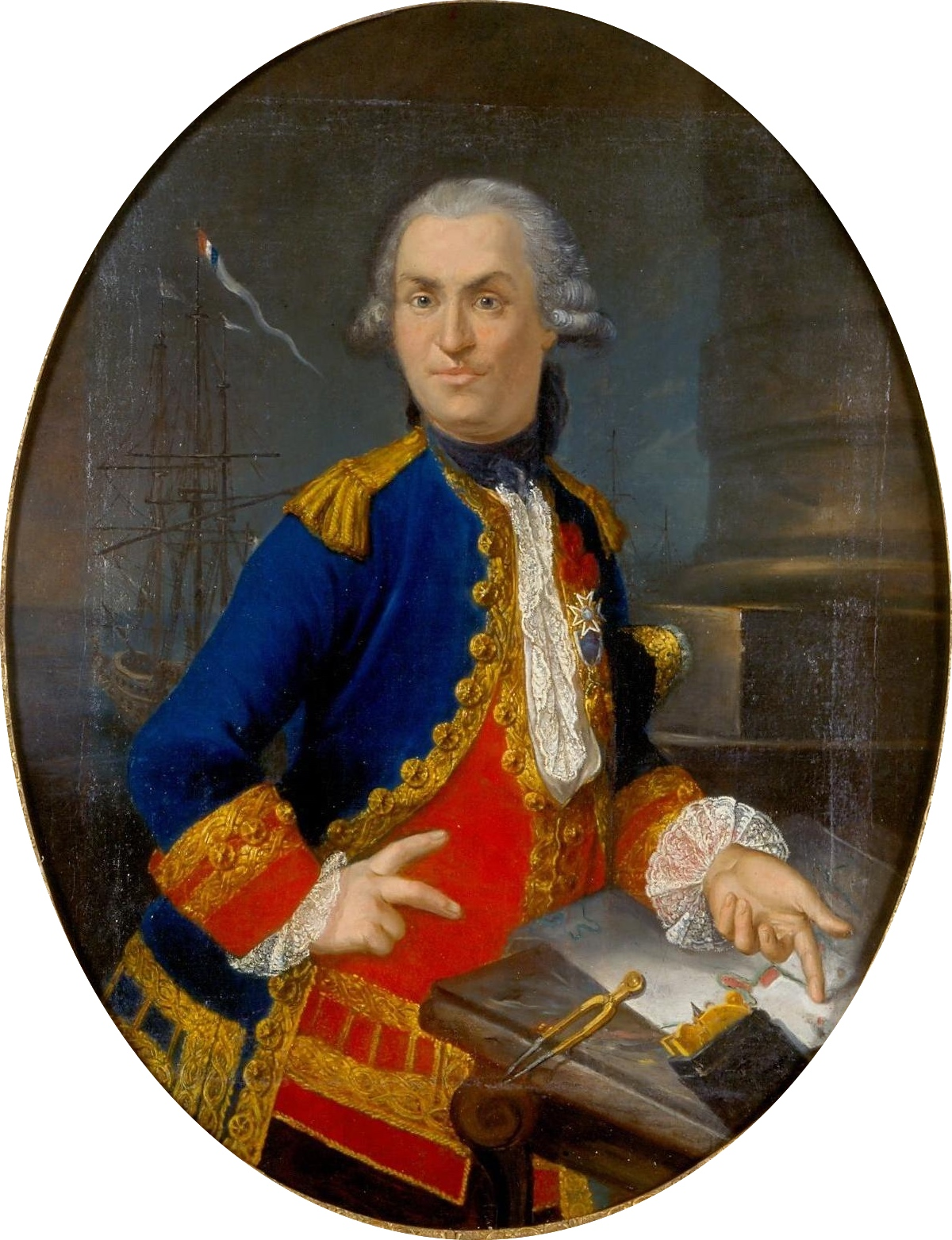
1786 portrait of Pléville

Returning to France, he was taken on by the harbour of Marseille as its harbour-captain. The British frigate Alarm, battered by a storm in the evening of 1 May 1770, ran aground on the coast of Provence amongst boulders, and was in imminent danger of breaking up. This event gave Pléville the chance to deploy his nautical knowledge, his self-control and his courage. Told of the danger the ship was in, he quickly mustered the harbour pilots, surrounded himself with the bravest sailors he could find, and at their head rushed to the relief of Alam, while confronting the perils of the sea in the darkest time of a stormy night. He moored himself to a grelin, slid alongside the boulders, reached on board the frigate with his wooden leg, and took command of it. The ship had already almost heeled over many times, and began to run aground. Pléville ordered a manoeuvre that got it afloat again and brought it into harbour at Marseille. This frigate was commanded by captain John Jervis, who later became a British admiral and was awarded the title of Earl of St Vincent for destroying the Spanish fleet at the cape of that name in 1797. de Pléville's fearless devotion and dignity was appreciated in England, with the lords of the Admiralty giving him a glowing testimony on behalf of the British government and commanding captain Jervis to return to Marseille in the frigate Alarm to give de Pléville a present and a letter expressing their sentiments on his inspiring conduct. The letter ran thus:

Sir, the quality of the service which you have rendered to the frigate Alarm gives rise to the noble envy and admiration of the English. Your courage, your prudence, your intelligence, your talents have merited a crown on your efforts from Providence. Success has been your reward, but we pray you to accept as a homage rendered to your merit and as a pledge of our esteem and recognition, that which captain Jervis is charged with rendering back to you. In the name and order of my lords, STEPHANS

The present was a piece of silverware in the form of an urn, on which were engraved dolphins and other maritime attributes, with a model of the Alarm, and a richly engraved lid surmounted by a triton. The vase bore the British coat of arms, and had the following inscription, intended to preserve the memory of the event which had merited this superb present:

Georgio-Renato Pleville Le Pelley, nobili normano Grandivillensi, navis bellicœ portusque Massiliensis pro prœfecto, ob navim regiam in litiore gallico pericli – tantem virtute diligentiâque suâ servatam septem vin rei navalis Britannicœ. M.DCCLXX.

Thinking that he could not receive a gift from a foreign sovereign, de Pléville only accepted the urn after having been duly authorised to do so by the king of France. Jervis was also extremely grateful to de Pléville, and eager for the chance to reward him. He wrote to his sister from HMS Alarm, anchored at Mahón on 27 December 1770:

I was twenty-four hours in the Bay of Marseilles, about a fortnight ago; just time enough to receive the warm embraces of the man to whose bravery and friendship I had, some months before, been indebted for my reputation, the preservation of the lives of the people under my command, and of the Alarm. You would have felt infinite pleasure at the scene of our interview.

Ten years later, de Pléville's devotion to the safety of the Alarm gained a different but no less honourable reward, when his son – a young naval officer – was captured on board a frigate at the end of a battle in 1780 and taken to England. There, the British Admiralty sent him back to France without requiring a prisoner-exchange, after having authorised him to choose three other French naval officers to go with him.

=== American Revolutionary War ===
During the American Revolutionary War, he acted as lieutenant de vaisseau in Charles Henri Hector, Count of Estaing's squadron from 1778 on board the flagship, the Languedoc. He took part in the whole campaign and in many different battles. d'Estaing entrusted him with gaining supplies and reprovisioning the fleet, and was astonished by his unselfishness, for those usually given that kind of mission would not let such a chance for self-enrichment pass them by. He was promoted to capitaine de vaisseau at the admiral's intervention, but returned to France with him and re-assumed his old duties at the port of Marseille. There, he also gave positive comparison to his contemporaries in his exemplary honesty (rare at that time), living only on his official wage and not on embezzled funds, despite having a large family to support. De Pléville was a member of the Society of the Cincinnati from France.

=== Under the French Revolution ===
Pléville adopted the principles of the French Revolution, as did most of the officers who had served in America, but in moderation. He was the treasurer of a revolutionaries' club at Marseille. He sailed to Avignon, where he disembarked, sabre in hand, to receive his orders. During the Reign of Terror, he was sent to take command of a division charged with escorting a resupply convoy to Tunis that had not yet got through, replacing Jean Gaspard Vence after he was accused of treason. On arrival, he realised that Vence was really in difficulties and had not failed in his duty in the slightest. Ignoring his orders, he kept Vence in his command and simply offered him his help. This brought de Pléville some difficulties with the authorities, but thanks to him [Vence's reputation would be fully rescued.

He fulfilled the functions of a Minister of the Navy for two years, and then reorganised the naval forces at Ancona and Corfu. He, Letourneur and Maret were the three plenipotentiaries sent to Lille in summer 1797 for (fruitless) peace negotiations with Britain. During his stay in Lille, on 19 July 1797, the Directory named him Minister of the Navy and the Colonies, to replace Admiral Laurent Truguet. Also in 1797 he was made a rear admiral.

As minister, he was once again remarked upon for his unselfishness, honesty and scrupulousness in a regime particularly marked by general corruption among the political and administrative elites. He was made vice admiral in April 1798, but dismissed from the ministry due to his disapproval of the expedition to Egypt, for which he was convinced the navy did not have the means. He was vindicated in this by the fleet's disastrous defeat by Nelson at the Battle of the Nile. At the age of 72, he commanded the French naval forces in the Mediterranean for a short while, then retired to Paris. The Consulate named him a senator in 1799, and the Empire brought him the honour of commander of the Legion of Honour on its creation, though he died soon after the honour was bestowed.

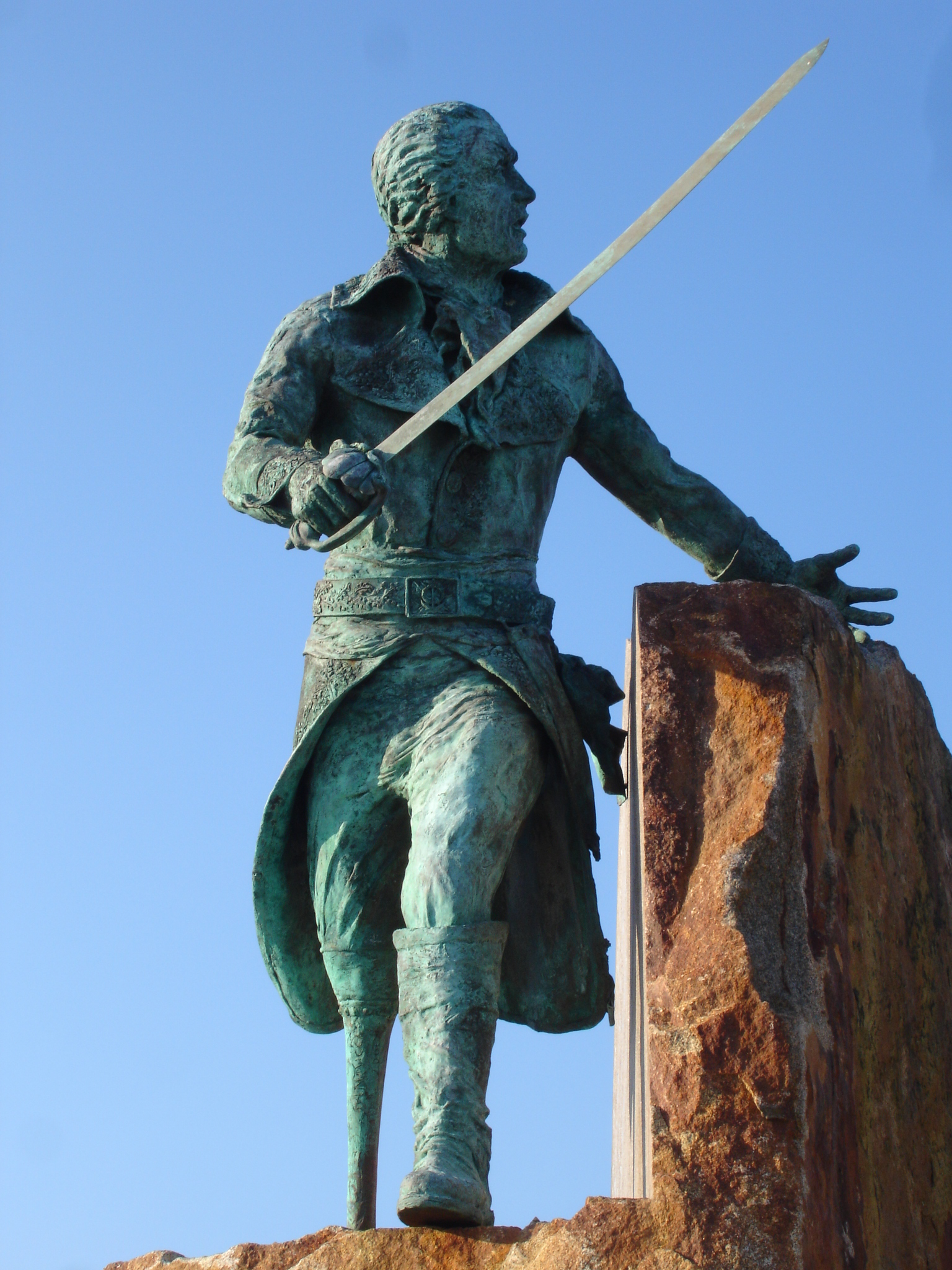
Statue of de Pléville at Granville

== Likenesses ==
His portrait may be seen in the musée du Vieux Granville, whilst his statue dominates Granville's port. Also, a bust of him may be seen at the palace of Versailles.

== Sources ==
- (in French) "Georges-René Pléville Le Pelley", in Charles Mullié, Biographie des célébrités militaires des armées de terre et de mer de 1789 à 1850, 1852
- (in French) Guy de Rambaud, Pour l’amour du Dauphin, Anovi 2005, ISBN 2-914818-02-5, biography of Agathe de Rambaud
- (in French) Guy de Rambaud, Les Rambaud, mille ans d'histoire (manuscrit)
- (in French) https://web.archive.org/web/20071029043803/http://www.histoire-empire.org/persos/le_pelley.htm
- (in French) Monique Le Pelley-Fonteny : Itinéraire d’un marin granvillais : Georges-René Pléville Le Pelley (1726–1805). Neptunia Vol. 55, Paris, 2000.
- (in French) His memoirs : Mémoires d’un marin granvillais, collectif, Collection patrimoine, Les Cahiers Culturels de la Manche, Maison du Département 50008 St-Lô
- (in French) Georges Fleury : lauréat du Prix Henri Queffélec 2000, pour son ouvrage Le Corsaire – Pléville Le Pelley – 1726–1805, éd. Flammarion
- (in French) Monique Le Pelley-Fonteny, Gilles Désiré dit Gosset, Antoine Reffuveille, Rémy Villand : Les amiraux granvillais, catalogue de l'exposition 2006–2007. Conseil Général de la Manche.
- (in French) Hubert Granier, contre-amiral (2è S.), Marins de France au combat 1715–1789, Editions France Empire, Paris, 1995
- (in French) Jean Marc Van Hille, les vicissitudes d'un marin provençal, Jean Gaspard Vence, 1747–1808, Service Historique de la Marine, Paris.
- (in French) https://web.archive.org/web/20080330220033/http://www.1789-1799.org/articles/rambaud/agathe_de_rambaud.htm

Military offices
Preceded by Laurent Truguet	French Naval Minister; 15 July 1797– 27 April 1798	Succeeded by Eustache Bruix
