= Laurent Jean François Truguet =

French Navy officer and politician (1752–1839)

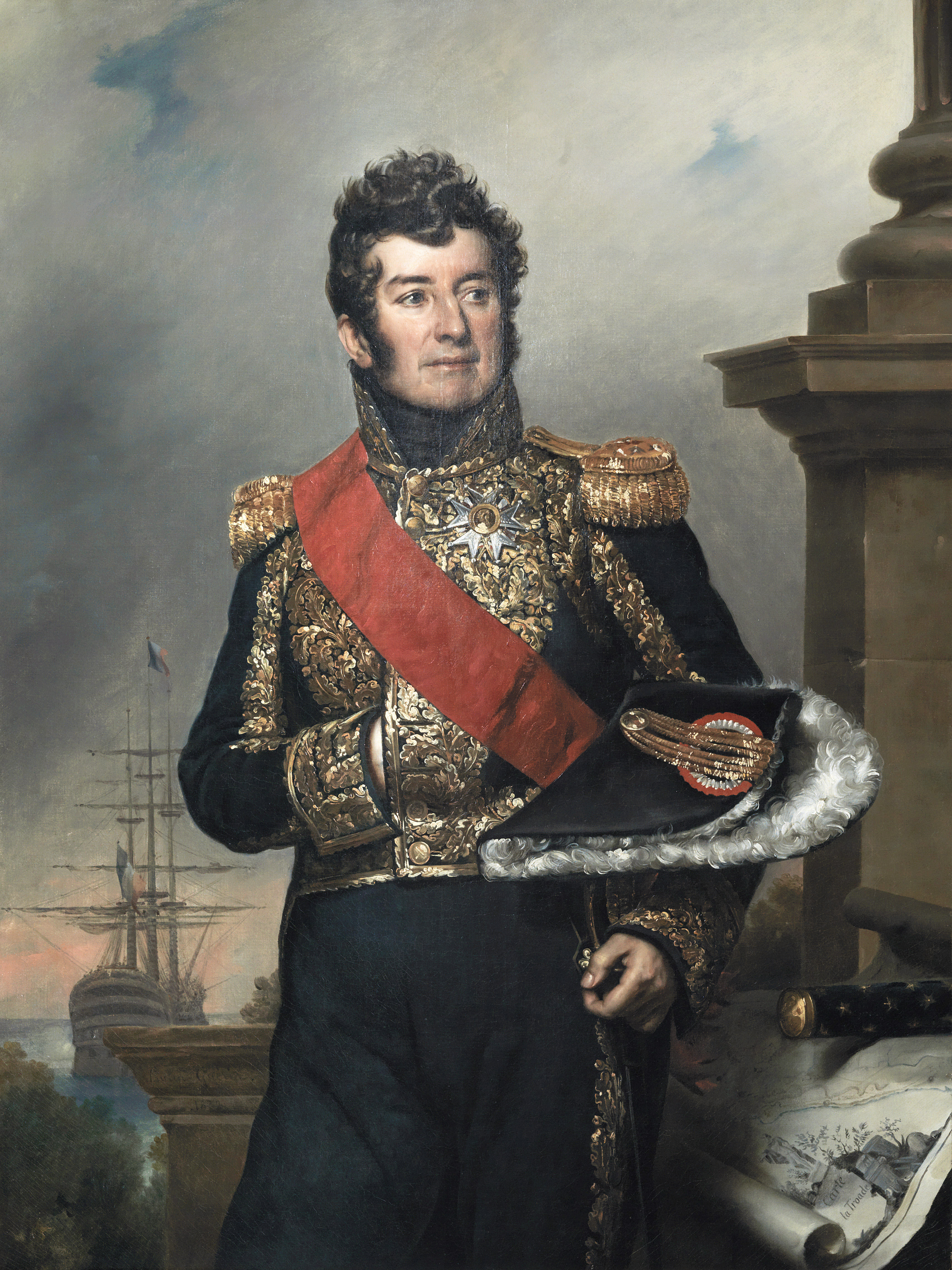
- Portrait by Jean-Baptiste Paulin Guérin, 1832
- Born: 10 January 1752; Toulon, France
- Died: 26 December 1839 (aged 87); Toulon, France
- Military career
- Allegiance: Kingdom of France; French First Republic; First French Empire
- Branch: French Navy; French Imperial Navy
- Service years: 1765–1804; 1809–c. 1811; 1814–c. 1819
- Rank: Vice admiral
- Awards: member of légion d'honneur, conseiller d'État, knight grand-cross of the order of Saint Louis, comte, peer of France

Vice-Admiral Laurent Jean François Truguet (English: /truːˈɡeɪ/, French: [lɔʁɑ̃ ʒɑ̃ fʁɑ̃swa tʁyɡɛ]; 10 January 1752 – 26 December 1839) was a French Navy officer and politician who served in the American Revolutionary War and French Revolutionary and Napoleonic Wars.

== Life ==
=== Youth up to the Revolution ===
Of aristocratic origins, and the son of a chef d'escadre, Laurent de Truguet entered the gardes de la marine in 1765. He navigated successively the Hirondelle, Provence, Atalante, Pléiade and Chimère. He won several prizes, awarded to the best gardes by Louis XV. He became enseigne de vaisseau in 1773 and had already served in eight campaigns by July 1778, when war was declared against Great Britain.

During the American Revolutionary War, he served on the frigate Atalante then on the vessel Hector under Charles Hector, comte d'Estaing, and taking part in the battle of St. Lucia. Lieutenant de vaisseau from 1779, in the siege of Savannah he saved the life of d'Estaing despite being severely wounded himself, for which he was made a knight of Order of Saint Louis.

On the Languedoc then the Citoyen, he took part in the battle of the Chesapeake, the battle of Saint Kitts and the battle of the Saintes as a member of Guichen's then de Grasse's fleet.

Major de Vaisseau from 1784, he cooperated in the tasks assigned to M. Choiseuil-Gouffier, ambassador to Constantinople, and was charged with instructing the Ottomans in the arts of fortification, artillery, metallurgy, naval architecture, and so on. Truguet commanded a brig, the Tarleton, with which he re-mapped the hydrography of the Dardanelles in 1785 and 1786, and in 1787 published a "Traité de Marine" (Naval Treatise) at Constantinople.

=== French Revolutionary Wars ===
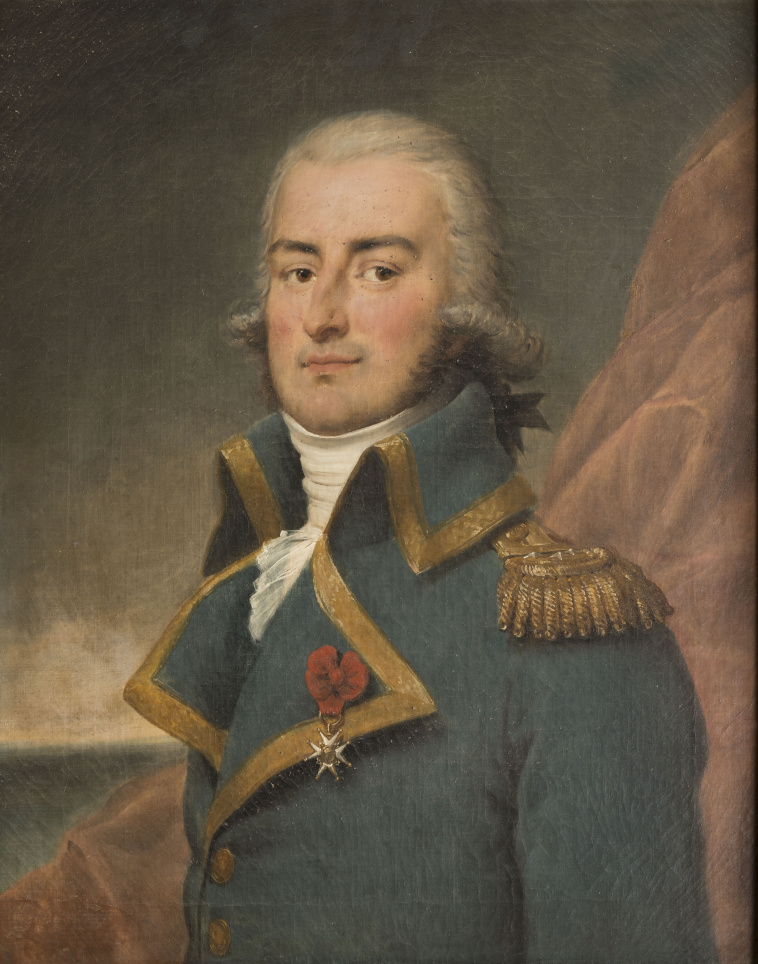
Truguet as a ship-of-the-line captain in 1792

On his return to France in 1789, he was sent to Brest in 1790 to take the command of a frigate there intended for a mission that was, in the end, rendered unnecessary by the course of events. He then made a trip in England for there to complete his naval education. Promoted to ship-of-the-line captain on 1 January 1792, he was promoted again as early as July 1793 to counter admiral, commanding the French naval forces in the Mediterranean from his flagship Tonnant. He bombarded the Savoyard cities of Nice, Villefranche and Oneglia, while Anne-Pierre, marquis de Montesquiou-Fézensac's troops occupied the Duchy of Savoy. That same year he and his fleet participated in the French expedition to Sardinia; he was moving to bombard Cagliari, when mutiny broke out among disembarking French troops which obliged him to sail to the beaches and reembark them.

Passing Corsica, he was received by the Bonaparte family and began a romance with Elisa Bonaparte, a sister of Napoleon; this led to close relations with the Bonaparte family which he would retain to his death. On his return to Toulon in March 1793, he went to Paris, where he got the government to adopt a maritime penal code, that would prevent many future insurrections and mutinies but still provoke much discontent in France's naval bases. He was discharged at the end of 31 May that year and imprisoned at the time of the publication of the law of suspects, but was liberated on 9 Thermidor (27 July).

He was promoted vice admiral in 1795 and minister of the Navy by the French Directory from November 1795 to July 1797. During his two years in this ministry, he reestablished discipline and order in France's harbours and arsenals, recalling former officers discharged due to the Revolution. Under pressure from general Hoche, he presented a plan for the 1796 French invasion of Ireland to the Directory, with Morard de Galle commanding the naval forces. This operation proved to be a complete fiasco. He organized and sent a division of frigates into the Indian Ocean under the command of Sercey.

He strove to force French colonies to implement the Law of 4 February 1794 which abolished slavery, and supported the creation of a collège intended for black and mixed-race children close to Paris; this collège later had the sons of Toussaint Louverture among its pupils, but was closed by Decrès in 1802.

Truguet also took the initiative in composing a new collection of naval tactics that would be adopted in year V of the French Republican Calendar. He broke with the exclusively defensive conceptions of the collection of 1769. He officialised and systematised the practice of having a light attack squadron within each fleet. This collection was later completed by the collection of year IX, also inspired by Truguet.

At the time of the ministerial reshuffle in preparation for the coup of 18 Fructidor year V (4 September 1797), he was replaced by Georges-René Pléville De Pelley, but was instead made France's ambassador to Spain. He was removed from the political scene under the pretext of not having returned to France fast enough at the end of his duties, though in fact this removal was down to Talleyrand, the minister of the foreign affairs, in revenge for Truguet opposing Talleyrand's embezzlements in Spain. Exiled to Holland, he remained there nine months. On his return from Egypt, Napoleon offered him the navy ministry again, but Truguet refused this, and was instead named conseiller d'État on 20 September 1801.

He composed four reports for the First Consul, proposing a reorganization of the navy and taking a strong position and courageous stand against Napoleon's reimplementation of slavery in French colonies, as Truguet's solid republican convictions made him consider equality as a fundamental right. He was probably the only official to dare oppose Napoleon on this point, and was violently attacked and mocked by those favoring a return to the old order in the colonies and strongly reprimanded by the First Consul. Nevertheless, in 1802 he was given command of the combined force gathered at Cadiz, with the eminent title of admiral-in-chief. The squadrons of Charles-Alexandre Léon Durand Linois, Honoré Joseph Antoine Ganteaume and Bedout were to gather at Truguet's headquarters. However, the 1802 Treaty of Amiens brought Truguet back to Paris.

=== First French Empire ===
When war broke out again, Napoleon entrusted to Truguet the organisation and command of the fleet at Brest, with his flagship being the Alexandre, then the Vengeur. In 1804, while all were conscientiously signing a "spontaneous" petition amidst his whole fleet to demand an imperial crown for Napoleon, in the same way as was being done in the army, Truguet publicly took a stand against the establishment of the Empire in a letter that became historic. This consigned him to 5 years of severe disgrace, and the loss of all his titles and his membership of the légion d'honneur.

In 1809, Napoleon recalled him to command the French squadron at Rochefort after the crushing British victory there at the battle of the Basque Roads. The following year, Napoleon put him at the head of the Kingdom of Holland's naval high command. Repulsed by foreign invasion, Truguet was one of the first to leave his post in the last years of the Empire.

=== Bourbon Restoration ===
Admiral Truguet returned to Paris where Louis XVIII brought him back into the navy at the head of the naval corps, and made him a knight grand-cross of the Légion d'honneur. During the Hundred Days, he received neither a command nor any favours from Napoleon. On the second restoration, he was given overall command of the Brest fleet, and received orders to keep the town's arsenal safe from the approaching foreign occupation troops. Succeeding in doing so, he was rewarded by the King by being made knight grand-cross of the order of Saint Louis, a comte, and a peer of France (5 May 1819).

At the end of the July Revolution, Truguet was elevated to the highest naval honour, that of Grand Amiral, naval equivalent to Marshal of France. He died aged 87 in 1839 in Toulon.

== Analysis ==
Certainly one of the most competent French naval officers of his generation, Truguet was a convinced republican despite his aristocratic origins. He was an effective minister and reestablished a little order in the navy after the excesses of the Terror. On the other hand, he bears some of the responsibility for the fiasco of the expedition to Ireland. Few men like him with important responsibilities dared to oppose Napoleon's reimplementation of slavery in French colonies or establishment of the Empire, and though his courageous stands made his relations with Napoleon complex and often stormy, Napoleon still considered him one of his better admirals and in difficult circumstances called upon him for confidential missions. He appears on the Arc de Triomphe.

== Sources ==
- (in French) "Laurent Truguet", in Charles Mullié, Biographie des célébrités militaires des armées de terre et de mer de 1789 à 1850, 1852
- (in French) Granier (Hubert) : Marins de France au Combat 1793–1815
- Six, Georges (1934). "Truguet (Laurent-Jean-François)". Dictionnaire biographique des généraux et amiraux français de la Révolution et de l'Empire: 1792–1814 (in French). Vol. 2. Paris: Librairie Historique et Nobilaire. p. 515.
- (in French) Thomazi (Auguste) : Les Marins de Napoléon

Military offices
Preceded by Jean-Claude Redon de Beaupréau	French Naval Minister; 15 July 1797 – 27 April 1798	Succeeded by Georges René Le Peley de Pléville
