= Lord Robert Manners (Royal Navy officer) =

Royal Navy officer (1758–1782)

Captain Lord Robert Manners
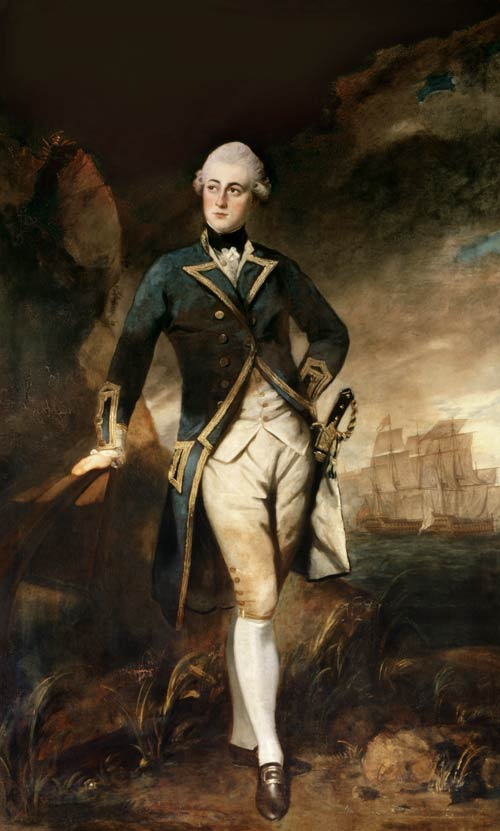
- Portrait by Sir Joshua Reynolds, 1782
- Born: 6 February 1758
- Died: 23 April 1782 (aged 24)
- Relatives: John Manners, Marquess of Granby; Frances Seymour
- Military career
- Allegiance: Great Britain
- Branch: Royal Navy
- Service years: 1772–1782
- Rank: Captain
- Conflicts: American War of Independence; Battle of Ushant (1778); Battle of the Chesapeake; Battle of the Saintes (WIA)

Captain Lord Robert Manners (6 February 1758 – 23 April 1782) was a Royal Navy officer who served in the American War of Independence.

== Life ==
Educated at Eton, he entered the Royal Navy in 1772. As the son of one of the greatest soldiers of the time, and grandson of a duke, he expected rapid advancement in rank. However, Lord Sandwich, the First Lord of the Admiralty, resisted his promotion to lieutenant until he had served for six years, as regulations demanded. He was so promoted on 13 May 1778 aboard HMS Ocean, and saw action in July at the First Battle of Ushant. He was moved to Victory, flagship of Admiral Keppel, on 17 September 1778.

Shortly after his promotion to lieutenant, Manners again began to appeal to the Admiralty for preferment. He was moved into Alcide on 15 July 1779, in the fleet of Admiral Rodney, then bound for Gibraltar. The urgings of the other Lords of the Admiralty, who reminded Sandwich of the political danger to himself and the North Ministry should they arouse the enmity of the Manners family, finally wore him down, and he wrote to Rodney on 8 December, asking him to contrive a promotion for Manners. Rodney lacked Sandwich's reservations about Manners, who proved a talented officer despite his ambition. The day after the Battle of Cape St. Vincent (17 January 1780), he promoted Manners captain and made him flag-captain of HMS Resolution under Sir Chaloner Ogle, newly promoted commodore. Soon after on 24 February Manners led part of the squadron which intercepted a French convoy off Madeira and captured the French 64 gun ship of the line Protée along with three transports.

In March, he was returned as member of parliament for Cambridgeshire in absentia in a boisterous contest, but would never take his seat.

Resolution returned to England soon after, and went out to North America with Admiral Graves. Under Admiral Rodney, Manners took her to the West Indies; Ogle was promoted rear-admiral and returned home during this period. Resolution went north to fight in the centre at the Battle of the Chesapeake (5 September 1781), and then returned to the West Indies with Rear-Admiral Hood to fight at St Kitts in January 1782.

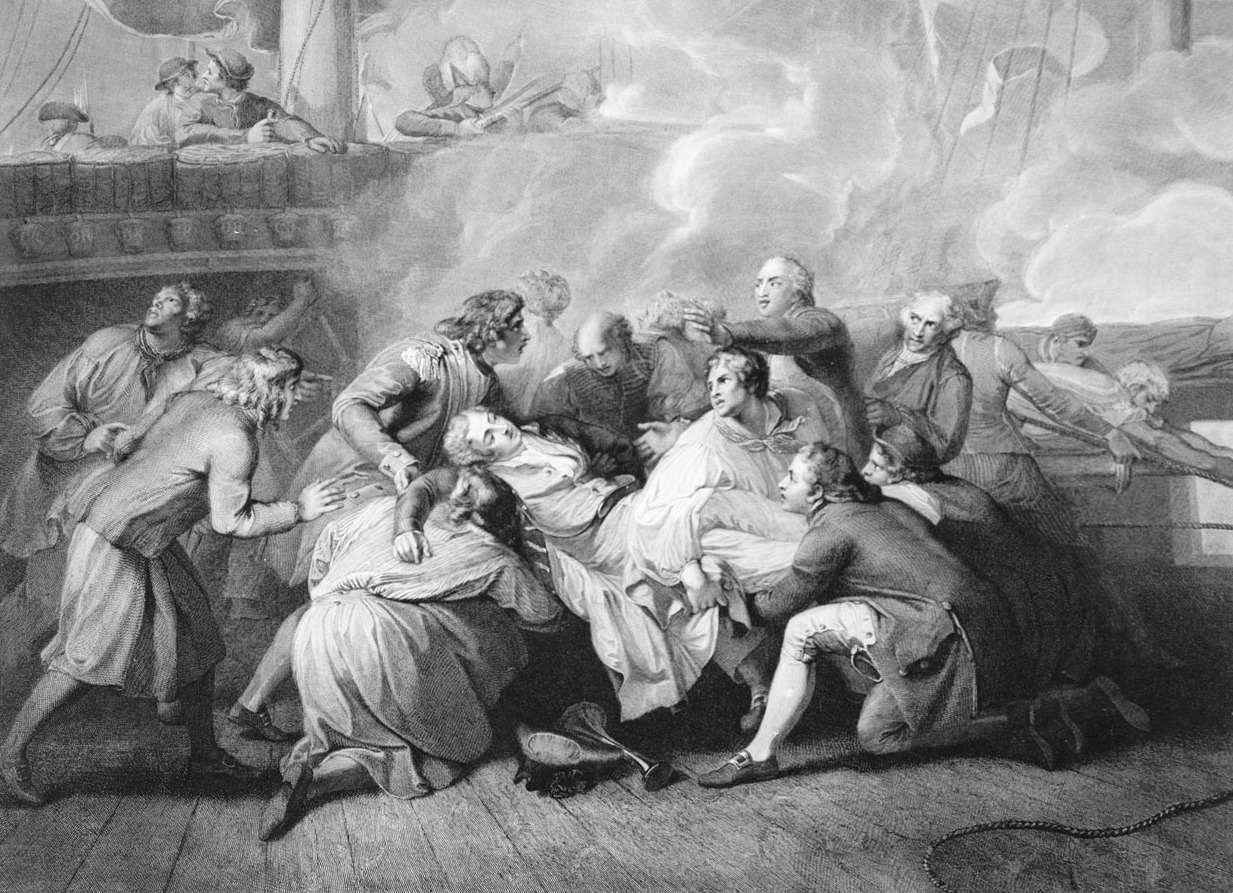
1786 engraving of Manner being mortally wounded at the Saintes

At the Battle of the Saintes (12 April 1782), Resolution was in the centre of the line and saw heavy action. During the battle, one of Manners' arms was broken, and he was wounded in both legs, one so severely as to require amputation. Being of a strong constitution, it was hoped he might survive, and he was sent back to England aboard the frigate Andromache. However, tetanus set in, and he died on 23 April 1782 and was buried at sea. A painting of his death, titled Lord Robert Manners Mortally Wounded, on board the Resolution in the memorable Engagement between Admiral Rodney & Count de Grasse, in the West Indies, the 12th of April 1782, was made for George Frederick Raymond's History of England, and is currently held by the National Maritime Museum.

Parliament of Great Britain
Preceded by Sir John Hynde Cotton, Bt; Sir Sampson Gideon, Bt	Member of Parliament for Cambridgeshire; 1780–1782; With: Philip Yorke	Succeeded by Philip Yorke; Sir Henry Peyton, Bt
