= French ship Léopard (1787) =

Ship of the line of the French Navy

- Scale model of Achille, sister ship of French ship Léopard (1787), on display at the Musée national de la Marine in Paris.

History

France
- Name: Léopard
- Namesake: Leopard (Panthera pardus)
- Builder: Brest
- Laid down: 15 November 1785
- Launched: 22 June 1787
- In service: July 1787
- Fate: Scuttled by fire on 12 February 1793

General characteristics
- Class & type: Téméraire-class ship of the line
- Displacement: 3,069 tonneaux
- Tons burthen: 1,537 port tonneaux
- Length: 55.87 m (183 ft 4 in)
- Beam: 14.46 m (47 ft 5 in)
- Draught: 7.15 m (23.5 ft)
- Depth of hold: 7.15 m (23 ft 5 in)
- Sail plan: Full-rigged ship
- Crew: 705
- Armament: 74 guns: Lower gun deck: 28 × 36 pdr guns; Upper gun deck: 30 × 18 pdr guns; Forecastle and Quarterdeck: 12 × 8 pdr guns, 10 × 36 pdr carronades

Léopard was a 74-gun Téméraire-class ship of the line built for the French Navy during the 1780s. Completed in 1785, she played a minor role in the French Revolutionary Wars.

== Description ==
The Téméraire-class ships had a length of 55.87 metres (183 ft 4 in), a beam of 14.46 metres (47 ft 5 in) and a depth of hold of 7.15 metres (23 ft 5 in). The ships displaced 3,069 tonneaux and had a mean draught of 7.15 metres (23 ft 5 in). They had a tonnage of 1,537 port tonneaux. Their crew numbered 705 officers and ratings during wartime. They were fitted with three masts and ship rigged.

The muzzle-loading, smoothbore armament of the Téméraire class consisted of twenty-eight 36-pounder long guns on the lower gun deck, thirty 18-pounder long guns and thirty 18-pounder long guns on the upper gun deck. On the quarterdeck and forecastle were a total of a dozen 8-pounder long guns and ten 36-pounder carronades.

== Construction and career ==
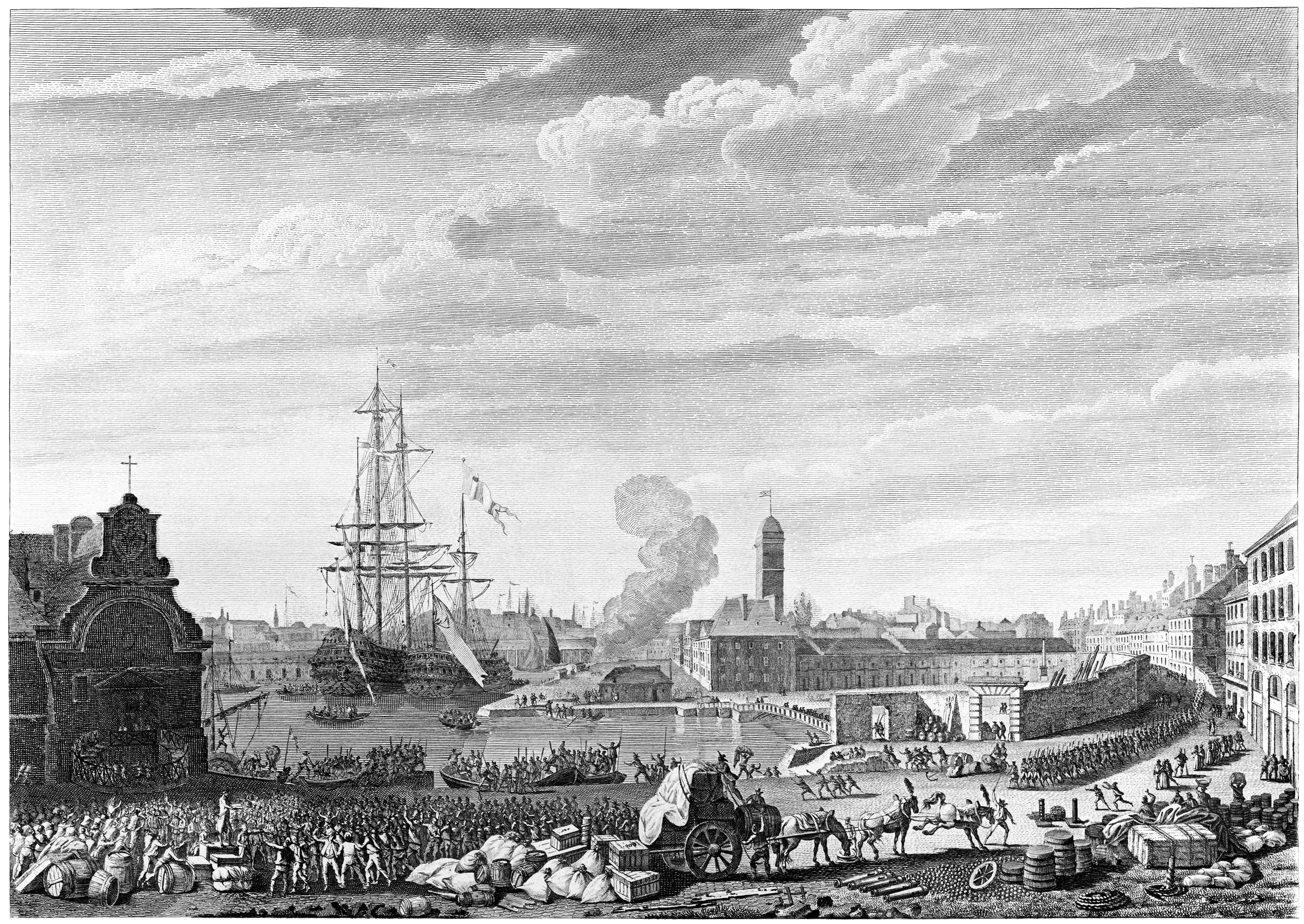
The French Revolution in Brest in September 1790 and the insurrection of the ships of the line, America and Leopard

Léopard was laid down at the Arsenal de Brest on 15 November 1785 and named on 28 January 1786. The ship was launched on 22 June 1787 and completed the following month. On 30 October 1788, Léopard departed Toulon for a cruise in the Caribbean, under Captain de la Galissoninère.

On 15 September 1790, a fight between sailors from Léopard and Patriote caused a mutiny; the entire crew of Léopard was expelled from the Navy by a decree of the National Constituent Assembly. From 1792, Léopard took part in the Expédition de Sardaigne under Captain Bourdon-Gramont, capturing Carloforte on 8 January 1793. On 17 February, Léopard ran aground in a storm off Cagliari; after two days trying to refloat her, the crew abandoned the ship and set her on fire after offloading the guns and matériel.

== Bibliography ==
- Roche, Jean-Michel (2005). Dictionnaire des bâtiments de la flotte de guerre française de Colbert à nos jours [Dictionary of French Warships from Colbert to Today]. Vol. 1: 1671-1870. Roche. ISBN 978-2-9525917-0-6. OCLC 165892922.
- Winfield, Rif and Roberts, Stephen S. (2015) French Warships in the Age of Sail 1786-1861: Design, Construction, Careers and Fates. Seaforth Publishing. ISBN 978-1-84832-204-2
