= French frigate Hélène =

34-gun Charmante class frigate of the French Navy

History

France
- Name: Hélène
- Builder: Rochefort
- Launched: 18 May 1791
- Captured: February 1793

Spain
- Name: Sirena
- Out of service: 1807
- Fate: Broken up 1807

General characteristics
- Displacement: 1,089 tonneaux
- Tons burthen: 535 port tonneaux
- Length: 134 ft (41 m)
- Beam: 34 ft 6 in (10.52 m)
- Draught: 5.5 m (18 ft)
- Sail plan: Full-rigged ship
- Armament: 32 guns: 26 × 12-pounder long guns; 6 × 6-pounder long guns; Several had 2 or 4 × 36-pounder obusiers added

Hélène was a 34-gun Charmante-class frigate of the French Navy. In 1793 she was captured by the Spanish Navy whilst endeavouring to make her escape, and was renamed Sirena.

She was broken up in 1807.
