= French frigate Gracieuse (1787) =

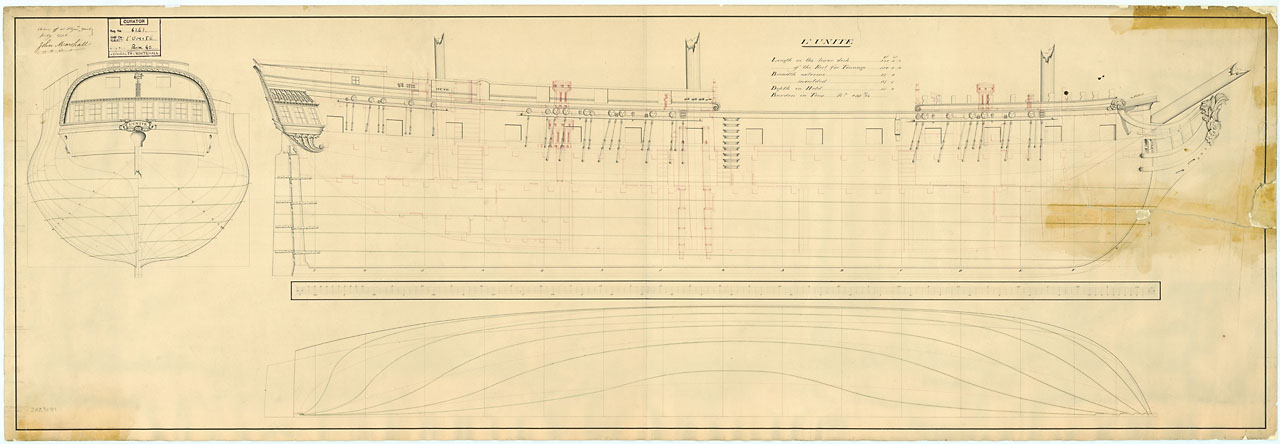
- HMS Unite - Ship plan 1796

History

France
- Name: Gracieuse
- Namesake: Gracious
- Builder: Rochefort (constructeur: Joseph Niou)
- Laid down: November 1785
- Launched: 18 May 1787
- Commissioned: May 1788
- Renamed: Unité on 28 September 1793
- Captured: 11 April 1796

Great Britain
- Name: Unite
- Acquired: 11 April 1796 by capture
- Fate: Sold in 1802

General characteristics
- Class & type: Charmante-class frigate
- Displacement: 1,089 tonneaux
- Tons burthen: 535 port tonneaux; 87371/94 (bm)
- Length: 142 ft 5 1/2 in (43.4 m) (overall); 118 ft 5 1/8 in (36.1 m) (keel)
- Beam: 37 ft 8 in (11.5 m)
- Draught: 5.4 m (18 ft)
- Depth of hold: 11 ft 0 in (3.4 m)
- Propulsion: Sails
- Sail plan: Full-rigged ship
- Complement: French service:270 (war) and 188 (peace); British service:254
- Armament: French service: 26 × 12-pounder long guns + 12 × 6-pounder long guns; British service; UD: 26 × 12-pounder guns; QD: 4 × 6-pounder guns; Fc: 2 × 6-pounder guns + 4 × 24-pounder carronades

Gracieuse was a 32-gun Charmante-class frigate of the French Navy. Renamed to Unité in 1793, she took part in the French Revolutionary Wars. The Royal Navy captured her in 1796 off Île d'Yeu and brought her into British service as HMS Unite. She was sold in 1802

== French service ==
Gracieuse was re-commissioned in Rochefort in April 1793 under captaine de vaisseau Chevillard. She transported troops between the Basque Roads and Sables-d'Olonne, and then returned to Rochefort. She transferred to the naval division on the coasts of the Vendée. There she escorted convoys between Brest and Bordeaux. Gracieuse took part in the War in the Vendée, capturing the British privateer Ellis on 11 July.

In September 1793 Gracieuse was renamed Unité. She was to be named Variante in April 1796, but the Royal Navy captured her before the name change took effect.

On 14 May 1794, Unité captured the ship-sloop HMS Alert after a short fight that left Alert with three men killed and nine wounded before Alert struck. The French Navy took Alert into service as Alerte.

Unité then undertook a crossing from Port Louis to Rochefort under commander Durand. On 13 April 1796 Indefatigable, under the command of Captain Sir Edward Pellew was in pursuit of a French frigate. Pellew signaled to his squadron mate HMS Révolutionnaire to sail to cut the frigate off from the shore. Revolutionnaire then captured Unite after having fired two broadsides into her. Unite had nine men killed and 11 wounded; Revolutionnaire had no casualties. Pellew ordered the prize to be commanded to England by Edward Ellicott, first lieutenant of the Revolutionnaire, who was cited by his captain Francis Cole "for his very particular attention in keeping sight of the chase, and for his steady and manly conduct when close engaged." The Royal Navy took the frigate into service as HMS Unite.

== British service ==
She was then captained by Ralph Willett Miller and Sir Charles Rowley.

On 9 October 1797 Unite captured the French Navy brig Decouverte, of 14 guns and 91 men. She was three days out of Nantes, on her way to Guadaloupe with secret dispatches that she managed to throw overboard before the British took possession of her. During the chase her crew threw 10 of her guns overboard in an attempt to lighten her. Decouverte arrived at Plymouth on 15 October. (Note: Decouverte had been launched at Saint-Malo in 1786 as Papillon. She was of 137 tons (French; "of load"), and her guns were 4-pounders. The Royal Navy did not take her into service.)

On 4 March 1799 Unite and the sloop Gaiete left Portsmouth as escorts to a convoy for the West Indies.

On 4 February, 1800 she was off the south coast of Porto Rico.

Lloyd's List reported in January 1801 that Unite had recaptured the brig Hiram. Hiram, Withey, master, had been sailing from Liverpool to Savannah when a privateer had captured her. The captain and two men had recaptured her, only to have a second privateer recapture then. Then Unite had recaptured Hiram and sent her into Martinique.

== Fate ==
Unite was paid off at Sheerness in April 1802. She was sold there in May 1802.
