= Charmante-class frigate =

18th century French Navy vessel

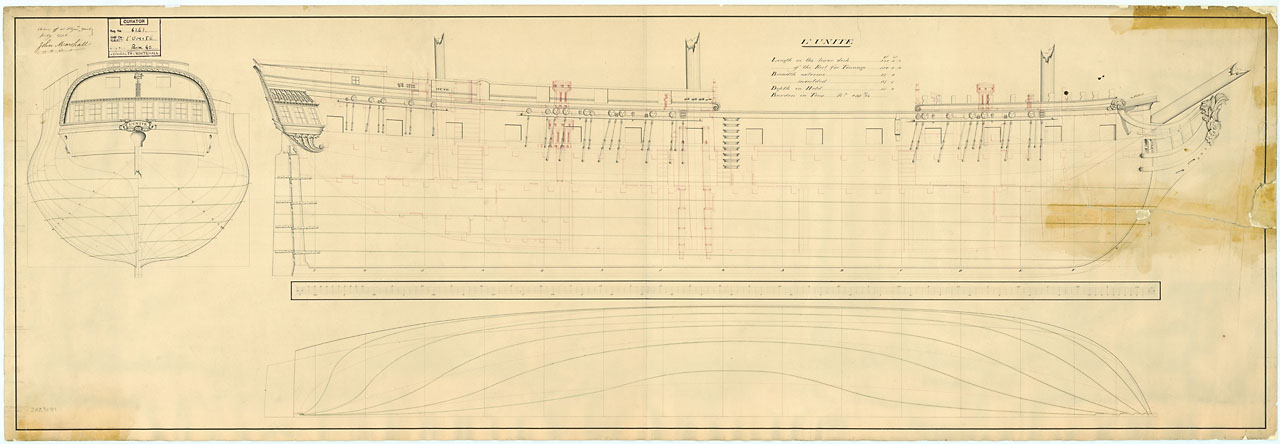
- HMS Unite - Ship plan 1796

Class overview
- Name: Charmante
- Builders: Brest, Saint-Malo, Nantes
- Operators: French Navy; Royal Navy; Spanish Navy
- In service: 1778 (Charmante) - 1796 (Grâcieuse)
- Completed: 5

General characteristics
- Type: frigate
- Displacement: 1,089 tonneaux
- Tons burthen: 535 port tonneaux
- Length: 44.2 metres
- Beam: 11.2 metres
- Draught: 5.4 metres
- Propulsion: Sail
- Armament: 32 guns: 26 × 12-pounder long guns; 6 × 6-pounder long guns; Several had 2 or 4 x 36-pounder obusiers added
- Armour: Timber

The Charmante class was a group of five 32-gun/12-pounder frigates of the French Navy, built during the late 1770s at Brest (lead ship) Nantes (2 ships) and Saint Malo (2 ships). They were designed by Jean-Denis Chevillard. Of the five ships, two were wrecked, two were captured by the British, and one by the Spanish.

- Charmante

Builder: Brest
Ordered:
Laid down: April 1777
Launched: 30 August 1777
Completed: January 1778
Fate: Wrecked on the Chaussée de Sein on 24 March 1780

- Junon

Builder: Rochefort
Ordered:
Laid down: September 1777
Launched: March 1778
Completed: May 1778
Fate: Wrecked by the Great Hurricane of 1780 off Saint Vincent on 11 October 1780

- Gracieuse

Builder: Rochefort
Ordered:
Laid down: November 1785
Launched: 18 May 1787
Completed: May 1788
Fate: Renamed Unité on 28 September 1793. Captured by the British on 11 April 1796, recommissioned as HMS Unite, sold in 1802

- Inconstante

Builder: Rochefort
Ordered:
Laid down: January 1789
Launched: 9 September 1790
Completed: February 1791
Fate: Captured by HMS Penelope and Iphigenia on 25 November 1793 off Saint Domingue and recommissioned in the Royal Navy as HMS Convert

- Hélène

Builder: Rochefort
Ordered:
Laid down: 1789
Launched: 18 May 1791
Completed: June 1792
Fate: Captured by the Spanish on 19 February 1793 during the French expedition to Sardinia and recommissioned in the Spanish Navy as Sirena
