= French frigate Charmante (1777) =

History

France
- Name: Charmante
- Builder: Brest
- Laid down: April 1777
- Launched: 30 August 1777
- In service: January 1778
- Fate: Wrecked on the Chaussée de Sein on 24 March 1780

General characteristics
- Class & type: Charmante class frigate
- Displacement: 1,089 tonneaux
- Tons burthen: 535 port tonneaux
- Length: 44.2 m (145 ft)
- Beam: 11.2 m (37 ft)
- Draught: 5.4 m (18 ft)
- Armament: 32 guns

Charmante was a 32-gun frigate of the French Navy, lead ship of her class.

== Career ==
In 1778, under Lieutenant Henri Pantaléon de Mac Nemara, (Note: Alternatively spelt "Macnémara", "Macnemara" or "Macnamara". Henri Pantaléon de Mac Nemara was the nephew of Vice-Admiral Jean-Baptiste Mac Nemara.) Charmante cruised in the Caribbean, arriving at Fort Royal on 23 June 1778.

On 1 September, as Charmante was escorting a convoy from Port-au-Prince around Saint-Domingue along with Dédaigneuse, she encountered the British frigate HMS Active, under Captain Williams-Freeman, and captured her.

On 16 February 1780, under Baron de la Haye, she was part of a squadron comprising the 64-gun Ajax and Protée, as well as the fluyt Éléphant. In the action of 24 February 1780, the convoy encountered a British force under George Rodney, and Protée sacrificed herself to cover the retreat of her fellows. While the convoy sailed on to the Indian Ocean with Ajax, Charmante returned to Lorient to bring the news of the battle, arriving there on 3 March.

== Fate ==
Charmante was wrecked on 24 March 1780 when a gale pushed her on the Chaussée de Sein. 83 men, including Captain Mengaud de la Haye, managed to escape on the ship's longboat, while 210 men died. (Note: According to Lacour-Gayet, Mengaud de la Hage also died in the accident.)
