= French expedition to Sardinia =

1793 expedition during the War of the First Coalition

- Part of the Mediterranean campaign of 1793–1796
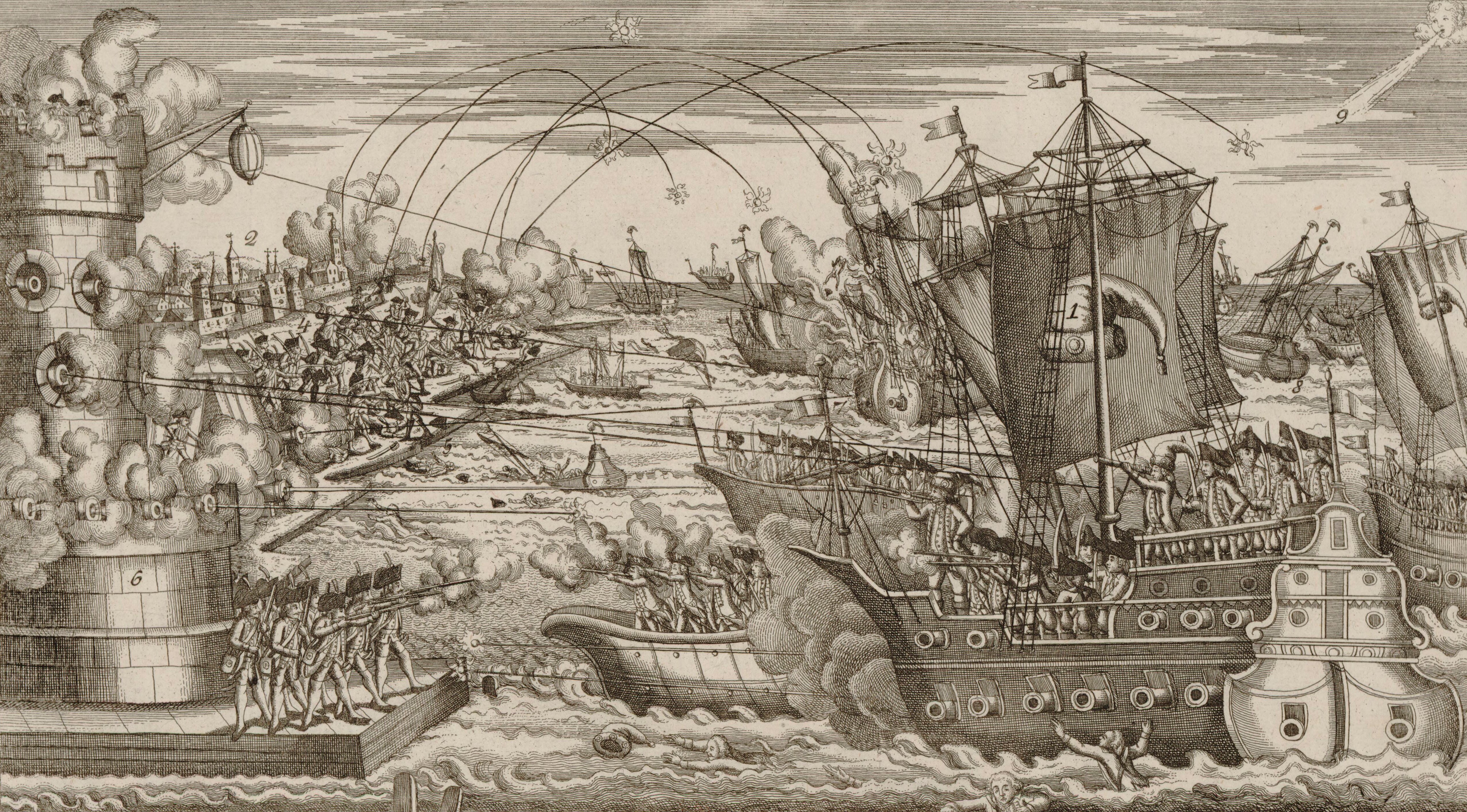
- Contemporary print of the French bombardment of Cagliari during the expedition
Date	21 December 1792 – 25 May 1793
Location	Sardinia, Kingdom of Sardinia 40°00′N 09°00′E
Result	Spanish-Sardinian victory

Belligerents
Sardinia; Spain	France

Commanders and leaders
Juan de Lángara	Laurent Jean François Truguet

Strength
10,000	5,000; Mediterranean Squadron

Casualties and losses
Minor	300 killed or wounded 200 captured 1 ship of the line wrecked 1 frigate captured 1 frigate scuttled
- Location within Europe

The French expedition to Sardinia was a short military campaign fought in 1793 in the Mediterranean Sea in the first year of the War of the First Coalition, during the French Revolutionary Wars. The operation was the first offensive by the new French Republic in the Mediterranean during the conflict, and was directed at the island of Sardinia, part of the Kingdom of Sardinia. Sardinia was neutral at the time, but immediately joined the anti-French coalition. The operation was a failure, with attacks directed at Cagliari in the south and La Maddalena in the north both ending in defeat.

The operation was launched by the French Mediterranean Squadron, led by Counter-admiral Laurent Jean François Truguet, under instructions from the National Convention. The government had issued orders to invade Sardinia, strategically important to the Mediterranean, which they believed would bring an easy victory. Delays in assembling the invasion force gave the Sardinians sufficient time to raise an army, and when the French fleet arrived off the capital Cagliari, the Sardinians were ready. The first attack was dispersed by a gale, but the second went ahead on 22 January 1793. French troops subsequently landed on 11 February but were driven off in fighting at Quartu Sant'Elena.

A subsequent attack on the island of La Maddalena off the northern coast of Sardinia also failed, partly due to sabotage by Corsican troops; it is most notable as the first military service of the Lieutenant Napoleon Bonaparte, later Emperor of France. On 25 May a Spanish fleet recaptured the small islands of San Pietro and Sant'Antioco, the last of the French garrisons on Sardinia. The legacies of the campaign included a series of popular revolts in Sardinia against the Savoyard rulers, a temporary breakaway of Corsica from France, and a rebellion at the French naval base of Toulon leading to the near destruction of much of the Mediterranean Squadron by the British and Spanish navies.

== Background ==
The French Revolutionary Wars began in April 1792 when the French declared war against the Austrian Empire, allied to the Kingdom of Prussia. Although the Kingdom of Sardinia, split between Savoy and Piedmont in the continent and the large Mediterranean island of Sardinia, was not part of this coalition, it was identified as a primary target of French military operations. The island of Sardinia was agriculturally rich and strategically important in the Mediterranean, and it was felt in France that its capture would intimidate the mainland part of the Kingdom and the other nations of the Italian peninsula, and spread republicanism beyond the borders of France. Moreover, a successful attack on the island was thought to be easily achievable, and orders were given for an expeditionary force to assemble at Toulon, the principal French Mediterranean naval base.

Command of this operation was given to Counter-admiral Laurent Jean François Truguet, the Mediterranean Squadron's commander, who had difficulty raising the necessary troops. France in general and the French navy in particular were undergoing severe social and political upheaval, and it was not until December that a sufficient expeditionary force had been prepared. Truguet and the Mediterranean Squadron then sailed with a French army, carried on transports, arriving off the capital of Sardinia, Cagliari on the southern coast, on 21 December 1792.

On Sardinia warnings of the impending French attack had arrived months earlier, although the political authority based with King Victor Amadeus III in Turin made little effort to reinforce the island, believing that to do so might be seen by the French as a provocation. The island's inhabitants however were devout Catholics, and the persecution of Catholic clergy in the aftermath of the French Revolution incited considerable opposition among the Sardinian people; the local government, the Stamenti, were able to raise more than 4,000 infantry and 6,000 cavalry, although the garrison was very short of artillery.

== Storm and siege ==
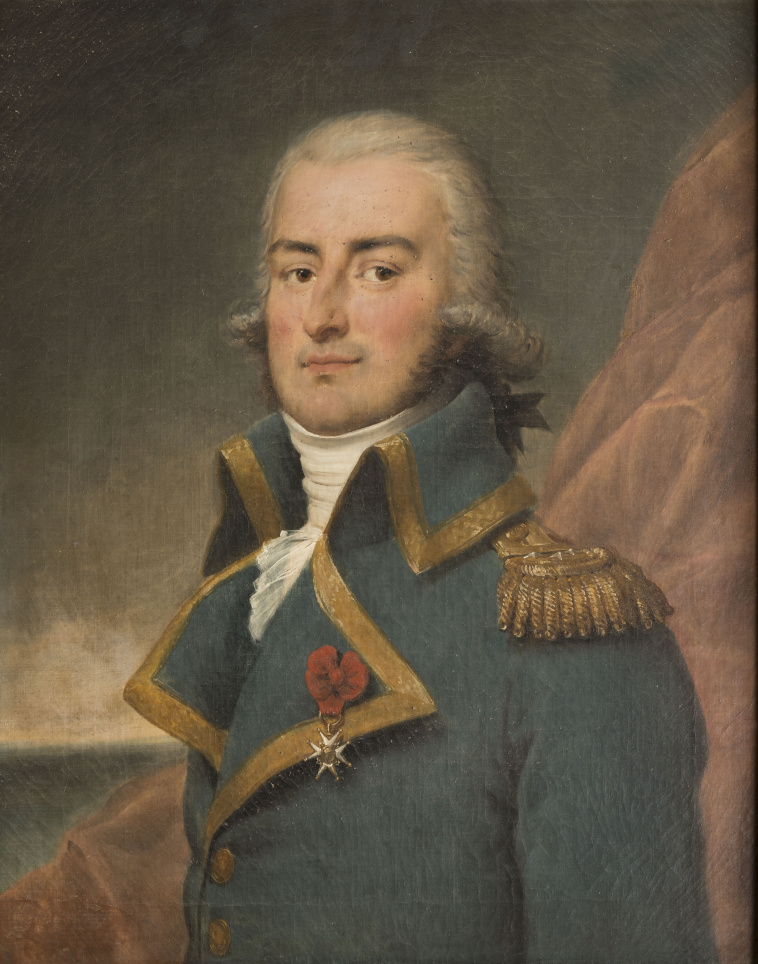
1832 portrait of Truguet as a ship-of-the-line captain in 1792

As the French fleet of 36 vessels entered the Golfo di Cagliari, a severe storm struck, driving Truguet's ships off-shore. A number of troop transports were lost and the rest of the fleet was driven to Palmas on the southwestern coast of the island. There Truguet landed troops on the islands of San Pietro and Sant'Antioco, both of which were taken without fighting. He also landed parties on the Sardinian mainland, although they were driven off by Sardinian militia sniping from the hillsides. The Sardinians attributed the storm to St Thomas the Apostle, on whose feast day it occurred.

Truguet remained off Palmas for a month, gathering his ships in preparation for another attack. On 22 January he again entered the Golfo di Cagliari, and sent a boat party of an officer and 20 men to demand the Sardinian surrender. The Sardinians, assembled for the feast day of Saint Ephesius, opened fire on the boat as it approached and killed 17 of the party, the survivors sheltering behind a neutral Swedish merchantman. Truguet was furious and ordered a heavy bombardment of the town on 25 January. By this point, Truguet had amassed 82 vessels for the invasion, including 41 transports, but his attack proved ineffective; the strength of the shore batteries and their use of heated shot inflicted significant damage to several French ships, which were unable to seriously damage the town.

=== Landing at Quartu Sant'Elena ===
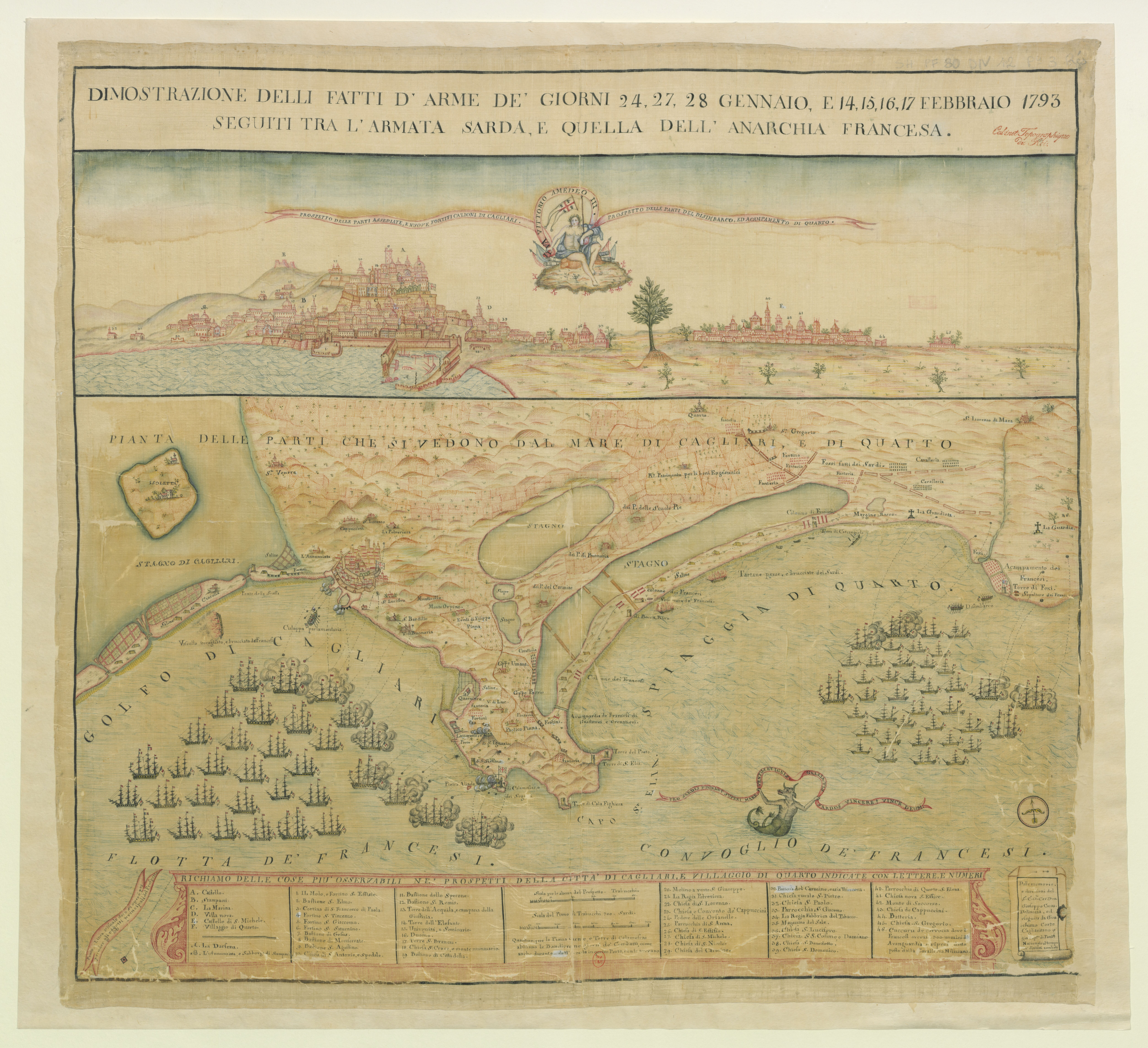
Drawning of the French attack

On 11 February a French detachment landed 1,200 soldiers at Quartu Sant'Elena. The troops advanced westwards towards Cagliari but were driven back by Sardinian cavalry. Attacks on the Cagliari lazaretto and a tower at Calamosca were also beaten off, but the French regrouped, landing additional forces until 5,000 French troops were encamped outside Quartu Sant'Elena. The town and Calamosca were attacked again on 15 February, with heavy artillery support from the French fleet, but without success. The force sent against Quartu Sant'Elena was struck by grapeshot fired from improvised barricades and retreated in disarray, while the other attack was defeated by a Sardinian counter-attack. Truguet withdrew his forces to the beachhead, leaving 300 dead and 100 prisoners in Sardinian hands; the victorious Sardinians were said to have dismembered the dead French soldiers and carried their body parts around as trophies.

On 16 and 17 February Truguet bombarded Cagliari again, to little effect. On the second day, another storm swept the bay and his fleet was again scattered. Several ships were lost, most notably the 74-gun ship of the line Léopard, which was driven ashore and wrecked. Truguet then abandoned the entire operation, embarking his soldiers and returning to France. He left 800 men and two frigates to garrison San Pietro and Sant'Antioco.

=== La Maddalena debacle ===
As Truguet sailed impotently off Cagliari, a second French force had been prepared for operations in Northern Sardinia. This force had drawn heavily from Corsica, the French held island to the north which was under the de facto command of Corsican independence advocate Pasquale Paoli. Corsica had been invaded and captured by a French army in 1768, and Paoli was pressing for greater autonomy from France in the aftermath of the Revolution. It was Paoli's plan to launch the Northern attack as a diversion to Truguet's operation off the capital, with the island of La Maddalena, a small, heavily fortified position off the northern coast, as the dedicated target. 450 Corsican volunteers were mustered, with Paoli's nephew Colonna Cesari in command. His second deputy was a Corsican artillery officer and political rival of Paoli, the young head of the Bonaparte family, Napoleon Bonaparte.

The force was delayed by storms at Ajaccio, and only reached La Maddalena on 22 February 1793, anchoring in the Santo Stefano channel. Napoleon advocated a night attack, but was overruled by Cesari. The following morning French-Corsican troops assaulted and captured Santo Stefano and used the fort on the island to bombard La Maddalena on 24 February, Cesari announcing his intention to conduct an amphibious landing the following day. During the night however, there was a mutiny reported aboard a corvette accompanying the force and Cesari immediately withdrew, abandoning the attack and Santo Stefano. Napoleon was furious, not least because Cesari did not warn him and he and his men were nearly left behind on Santo Stefano and vulnerable to a Sardinian counter-attack. In the retreat to the landing zone, Napoleon's men were forced to spike and abandon their cannon when insufficient boats were sent to collect them. He later accused Cesari of faking the mutiny on the orders of Paoli.

== Aftermath ==
The final act of the campaign came three months after both Truguet and Cesari had withdrawn. Truguet's garrison remained on the islands of San Pietro and Sant'Antioco on the western side of Sardinia until 25 May. That month, a Spanish fleet of 23 ships under Admiral Juan de Lángara sailed from Cartagena, and arrived off the islands. The Spanish had gone to war with France in March 1793, and against such an overwhelming force the entire garrison surrendered. Of the frigates, Hélène, was captured in an attempt to escape the Spanish blockade, while Richmond was set on fire and scuttled by the crew to prevent its capture.

Although the operation had ended in complete failure it had a number of repercussions. On Sardinia the robust defence of the island encouraged the Stamenti to seek concessions from the distant central government in Turin, following an open invitation from Victor Amadeus. A list of demands for greater autonomy by the Sardinian Stamenti was presented to the king by a deputation from the island, but shortly afterwards a flat refusal of all points was proclaimed by both the king and the Viceroy Carlo Balbiano. The Sardinian people were furious and civil unrest spread throughout the island. In April 1794 the viceroy arrested two leaders of the growing insurrection, causing a riot in which the Castle of San Michele was stormed and the prisoners released. In the aftermath Victor Amadeus was forced to make concessions to the Sardinians, although violence continued until 1796. Two years later the new king Charles Emmanuel IV, was forced to flee to the island following the outbreak of the War of the Second Coalition.

On Corsica the recriminations which followed the failure at La Maddalena saw the Buonaparte faction driven from the island, Napoleon narrowly escaping an assassination attempt. Efforts by the National Convention to hold Paoli to account for the actions of his supporters in the operation led to a breakdown in the relationship between Paoli and the French government and a large-scale rebellion on Corsica which saw the French garrison driven into three fortified positions on the Northern Coast. In early 1794 a British force invaded Corsica and defeated the French, Paoli seceding from France and agreeing to the incorporation of Corsica as a self-governing kingdom within the British Empire. Following political conflict, Paoli was driven into exile in late 1795, and the British remained on Corsica until late 1796, at which point the island rejoined the French Republic.

In France the defeat led to the recall of Truguet to Paris to explain events to the National Convention, and his temporary replacement by Trogoff de Kerlessy. The defeat undermined morale among the fleet and civil authorities at Toulon, exacerbating existing revolutionary tensions. A series of mutinies and public executions followed against the background the burgeoning Reign of Terror. When ordered to attack Lángara's fleet off Toulon in June, Trogoff refused as he believed his crews would refuse to put to sea, and announced that he would delay action until Truguet returned. In July, a large British fleet arrived off the port under Vice-Admiral Lord Hood, and political authority in Toulon collapsed entirely, with the Girondist civil government declaring for the exiled French monarchy and inviting the British to occupy the town and seize the fleet on 18 August. Trogoff acquiesced in the occupation, despite a revolt among the sailors under his command. French Republican forces attacked the city, and in the ensuing Siege of Toulon the climactic assault which retook the heights over the city in December 1793 was led by Napoleon, who was wounded in the attack. He later became one of the most effective generals of the French Republic and subsequently seized control of the country and pronounced himself Emperor of France.

== Bibliography ==
- Chandler, David (1999) [1993]. Dictionary of the Napoleonic Wars. Ware, Hertfordshire: Wordsworth Military Library. ISBN 1-84022-203-4.
- Gregory, Desmond (1985). The Ungovernable Rock: A History of the Anglo-Corsican Kingdom and its role in Britain's Mediterranean Strategy During the Revolutionary War (1793–1797). London & Toronto: Associated University Presses. ISBN 978-0-8386-3225-3.
- Ireland, Bernard (2005). The Fall of Toulon: The Last Opportunity the Defeat the French Revolution. London: Cassell. ISBN 0-3043-6726-5.
- McLynn, Frank (1998). Napoleon: A Biography. London: Pimlico. ISBN 0-7126-6247-2.
- Smyth, William Henry (1828). Sketch of the Present State of the Island of Sardinia. London: John Murray. "Truguet."

Preceded by Battle of Famars	French Revolution: Revolutionary campaigns French expedition to Sardinia	Succeeded by Battle of Kaiserslautern
