= HMS Resolution (1770) =

Ship of the line of the Royal Navy

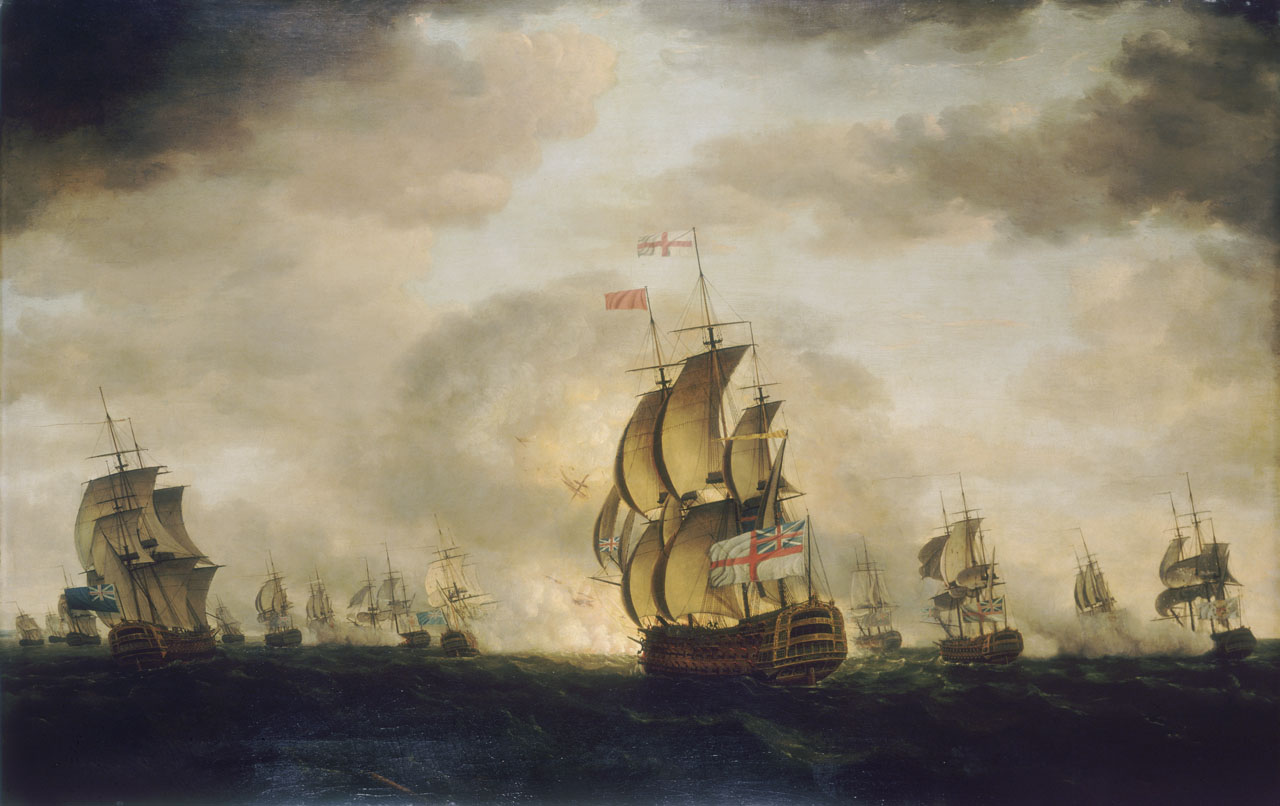
- Resolution at the Battle of Cape St. Vincent

History

Great Britain
- Name: HMS Resolution
- Ordered: 16 September 1766
- Builder: Deptford Dockyard
- Laid down: July 1767
- Launched: 12 April 1770
- Honours and awards: Participated in: Battle of Cape St Vincent; Battle off Halifax (1780); Battle of the Chesapeake; Battle of the Saintes
- Fate: Broken up, 1813

General characteristics
- Class & type: Elizabeth-class ship of the line
- Tons burthen: 161211/94 (bm)
- Length: Overall:168 ft 6 in (51.4 m); Keel:137 ft 7 3/4 in (42.0 m)
- Beam: 46 ft 11 in (14.3 m)
- Depth of hold: 19 ft 9 in (6.0 m)
- Propulsion: Sails
- Sail plan: Full-rigged ship
- Armament: Originally; Gundeck: 28 × 32-pounder guns; Upper gundeck: 28 × 18-pounder guns; QD: 14 × 9-pounder guns; Fc: 4 × 9-pounder guns; 1800s; QD: 14 × 32-pounder carronades; Fc: 2 × 9-pounder guns + 2 × 32-pounder carronades

HMS Resolution was a 74-gun third-rate ship of the line of the Royal Navy. Designed by Sir Thomas Slade and built under the direction of Adam Hayes at Deptford Dockyard, she was launched on 12 April 1770. The ship had a crew of about 600 men, and took part in several major naval engagements.

== Service history ==
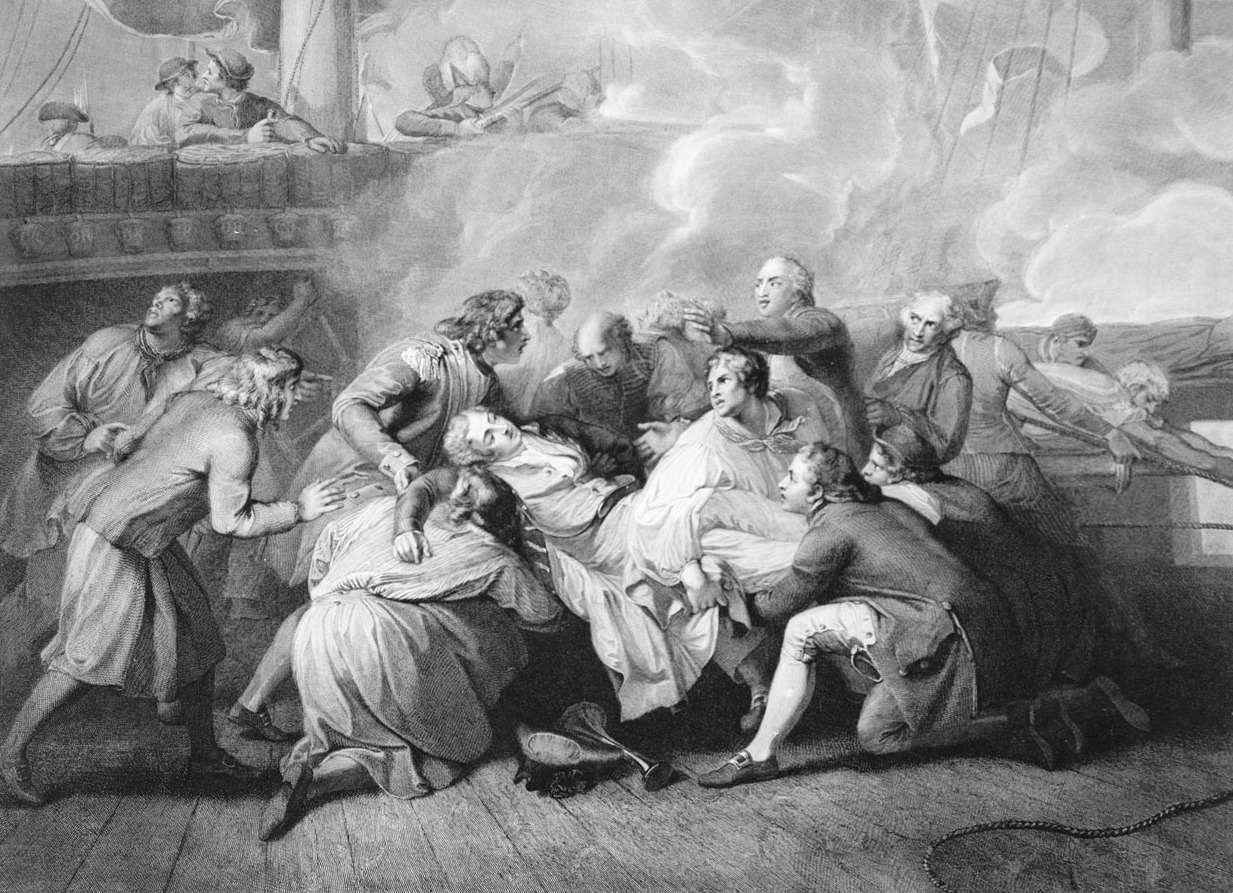
Lord Robert Manners being mortally wounded onboard Resolution at the Battle of the Saintes

Resolution took part in the Spithead review of 1773. She was at Halifax, Nova Scotia on 17 May 1776 under Vice-admiral George Murray. During the American War of Independence, Resolution, under Captain Lord Robert Manners, participated in the Battle of Cape St. Vincent in 1780, the Battle of the Chesapeake and Battle of Fort Royal in 1781 and the Battle of the Saintes in 1782. Manners was mortally wounded at the Battle of the Saintes and died during the return voyage to England. During the Napoleonic Wars she fought in the Battle of Copenhagen in 1807 and the Battle of the Basque Roads in 1809. In 1809 she was part of the failed Walcheren Campaign. Resolution was broken up in 1813.

== Notable commanders ==
- Captain William Hotham 1770 to 1773
- Captain Chaloner Ogle 1775 to 1780
- Lord Robert Manners 1780 to 1782
- Sir James Wallace briefly in 1782
- Captain William Lechmere 1797/8
- Captain Alan Hyde Gardner 1799 to 1802
- Captain George Burlton 1806 to 1809
