= Jean-Baptiste Cléry =

Personal valet to King Louis XVI. (1759–1809)

- Born: 1759
- Died: 1809 (aged 49–50)

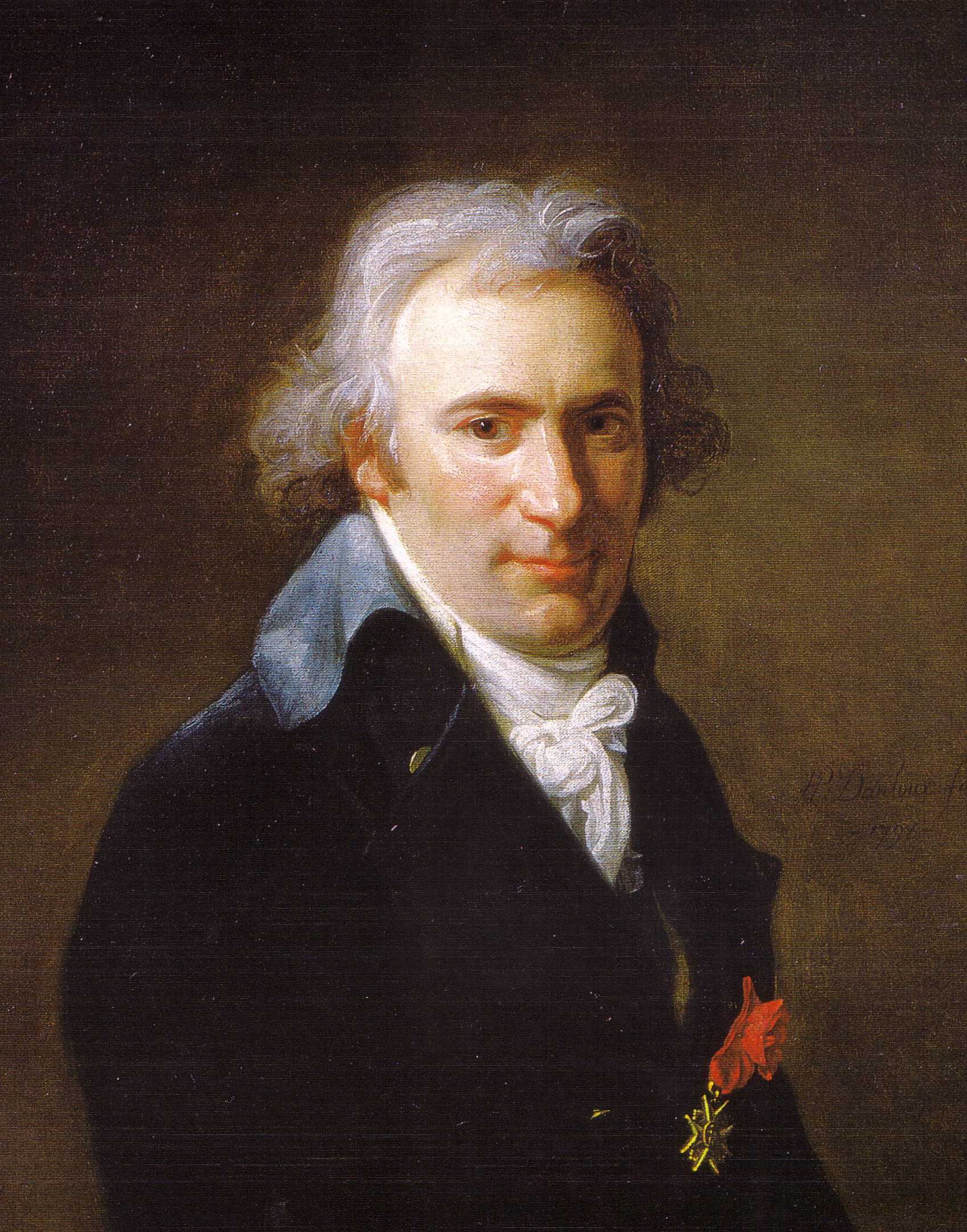
Jean-Baptiste Cléry

Jean-Baptiste Cléry (1759–1809) was the personal valet to King Louis XVI.

== Biography ==
=== Before the Revolution ===
First serving as secretary of the Princess of Guéménée, he was made valet of the dauphin (who would become Louis XVII).

=== During the Revolution ===
Cléry became the valet of Louis XVI when he was imprisoned in the Temple until 21 January 1793. Although he was arrested on 25 September 1793, he avoided the fate of the guillotine and was freed on 27 July 1794. In his Last Will and Testament, Louis had bequeathed to Cléry "my clothes, my books, my watch, my purse, and all other small effects which have been deposited with the council of the commune."

=== After the Revolution ===
Cléry became valet to the Count of Provence (future Louis XVIII) and gave him his journal detailing the events of the revolution. His journal gave an account of what he saw of his touching farewell with his family. The journal was published and was well received, and later led to Cléry's being knighted by Louis XVIII. The popularity and pro-royalist sentiments generated by the memoirs led the French government to release a distorted copy of the book.

Cléry moved to Austria and purchased an estate where he stayed until his death in 1809.
