= Heidenhain (disambiguation) =

Heidenhain may refer to:

- Heidenhain, a German machine tool manufacturer
- Anna Heidenhain, a German artist
- Martin Heidenhain, a German anatomist, inventor of Heidenhain's AZAN trichrome stain
- Rudolf Heidenhain, a German physiologist and father of Martin Heidenhain
