= Robert Froriep =

German anatomist

Robert Friedrich Froriep (2 February 1804 – 15 June 1861) was a German anatomist who was a native of Jena. He was the father of anatomist August von Froriep (1849–1917).

He studied medicine in Bonn, and later became prosector and conservator of the pathological museum at the Charité Hospital in Berlin, where he was mentor to Rudolf Virchow (1821–1902). He held these position at the Charité from 1833 until 1846, and supplemented his income as a teacher of anatomic drawing at the Academy of Fine Arts. In 1847 he was succeeded by Virchow as prosector at the Charité.

In the spring of 1846 he succeeded his father as director of the Weimarischer Landes-Industrie-Comptoir in Weimar, where he worked as a publisher of illustrated scientific and medical works. In 1851 he returned to medicine, and several years later sold the Landes-Industrie-Comptoir to Ludwig Denicke from Lüneburg.

Froriep is largely known for popularizing non-German illustrated works, making them known to German scientists and physicians. He published Abbildungen der Hautkrankheiten, a translation of Thomas Bateman's "Delineations of Cutaneous Disease". He also published translated works of Astley Cooper (1768–1841), Guillaume Dupuytren (1777–1835), Louis Joseph Sanson (1790–1841) and Louis Jacques Bégin (1793–1859).

In 1843 Froriep made early mention of a condition that would later be known as fibromyalgia, describing it as "rheumatism with painful, hard places" that could be felt in many locations on the body. He characterized the condition as muskelschwiele (muscle callus) and reported his findings in a paper titled "Ein beitrag zur pathologie und therapie des rheumatismus".
