= August von Froriep =

German anatomist

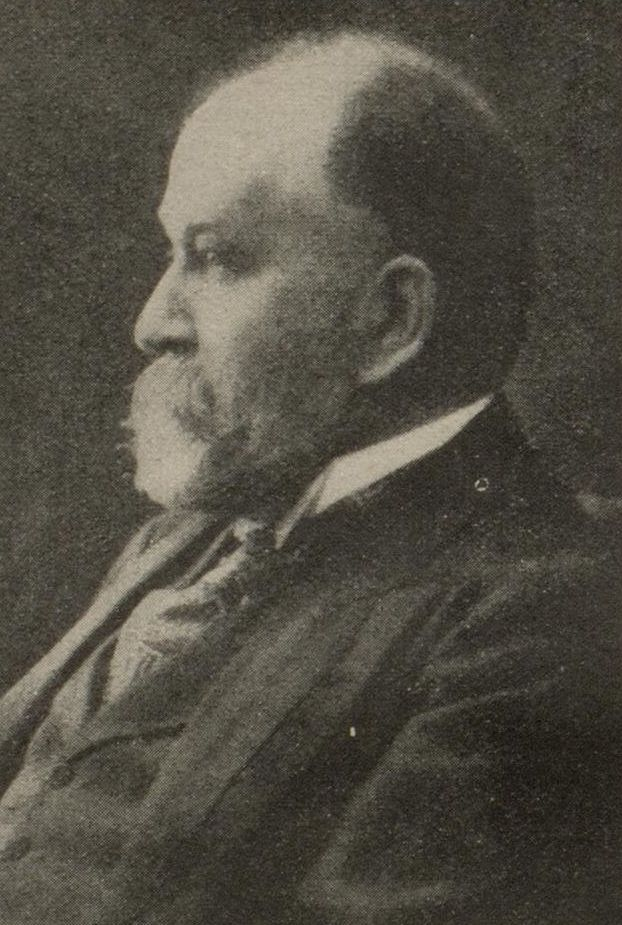
August von Froriep

August von Froriep (10 September 1849 – 11 October 1917) was a German anatomist born in Weimar.

He studied medicine in Leipzig, and after earning his doctorate in 1874, he became an assistant to Christian Wilhelm Braune (1831–1892). Later he was a prosector and eventually a professor at the University of Tübingen. Following his death in 1917, he was succeeded by Martin Heidenhain (1864–1949) as professor of anatomy at Tübingen. He was the son of anatomist and publisher Robert Friedrich Froriep (1804–1861).

Froriep specialized in studies involving the development and biological morphology of the head and vertebra. His name is lent to "Froriep's ganglion", which is a temporary group of nerve cells associated with the hypoglossal nerve of an embryo.

In 1911, Froriep claimed to have identified the "famous skull" of poet Friedrich von Schiller from a mass gravesite, of which he published an article titled Die Schädel Friedrich von Schillers und des Dichters Begräbnisstätte. However, there are detractors to Froriep's claim, and as of late 2007 the authenticity of the skull remains unproven.

== Selected writings ==
- Anatomie für Künstler. Kurzgefasstes Lehrbuch der Anatomie, Mechanik, Mimik und Proportionslehre des menschlichen Körpers, 7th edition 1937.
- Der Schädel Friedrich von Schillers und des Dichters Begräbnisstätte (The skull of Friedrich Schiller and the poet's burial place), 1913
- Schädel, Totenmaske und lebendes Antlitz des Hoffräuleins Luise von Göchhausen (Skull, death mask and the face of the maid of honor Luise von Göchhausen), 1917
