= Chief (heraldry) =

Ordinary in heraldic blazon; horizontal band at the top of a coat of arms

The shield above, which is the arms of Menzies, depicts a red chief placed on a silver shield, and its blazon is Argent, a chief gules.

In heraldic blazon, a chief is a charge on a coat of arms that takes the form of a band running horizontally across the top edge of the shield. Writers disagree in how much of the shield's surface is to be covered by the chief, ranging from one-fourth to one-third. The former is more likely if the chief is uncharged, that is, if it does not have other objects placed on it. If charged, the chief is typically wider to allow room for the objects drawn there.

The chief is one of the ordinaries in heraldry, along with the bend, chevron, fess, and pale. There are several other ordinaries and sub-ordinaries.

== Variations of chief ==
The chief may bear charges and may also be subject to variations of the partition lines. It cannot, however, be cotised. The chief may be combined with another ordinary, such as a pale or a saltire, but is almost never surmounted by another ordinary. The chief will normally be superimposed over a bordure, orle and tressure, if they share the same shield.

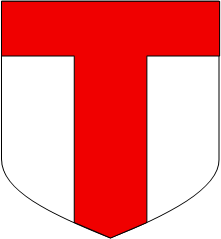
A chief combined with a pale makes a shape resembling the letter T.

A chief bearing charges (two scallops).

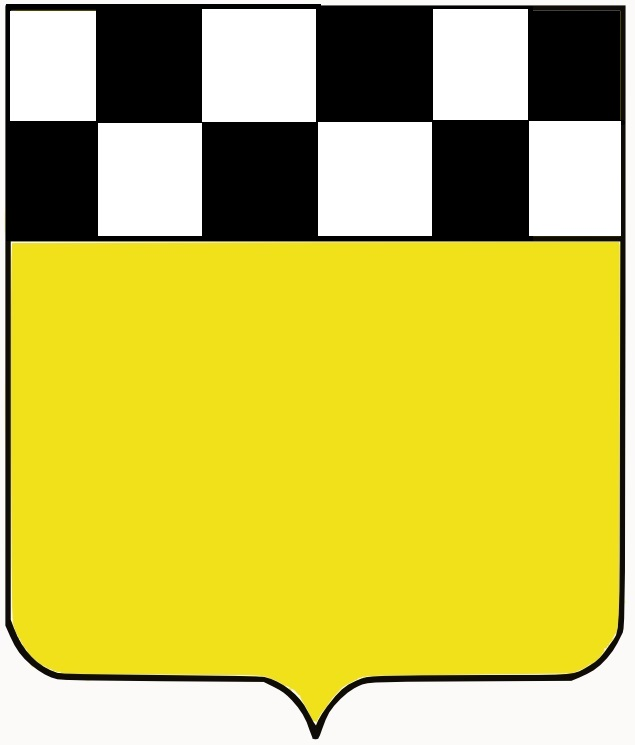
Chief chequy of 2, Flanders.

A chief indented (Fernelmont, Belgium).

A chief wavy (Brinon-sur-Beuvron, France).

Rare example of a chief that occupies half the shield.

A chief fretty (Wolkrange, Belgium).

Rare example of a chief surmounted by another ordinary (a chevron) (Sampigny, France).

A chief impaled (Eton College).

== Other variations ==
In some medieval and Renaissance drawings of coats of arms, the chief is drawn even deeper, so that it fills almost all the top half of the shield. In some cases, it is drawn so wide that it will look as though the shield is divided party per fess.

There is a diminutive version of the chief, called a comble, but this does not occur in English and Scottish heraldry.

A chief triangular can be found in French and English armory. This ordinary begins in the corners and extends to a point that is one quarter to one third the way down the shield. It is a complex line division variant of a chief. A chief enarched is drawn with a concave arch. There is also a double-arched version of a chief.

The chief can be used as a mark of cadency, in order to difference the coat of arms in a minor line of a family, though this is rare and practically confined to cases in which a system of bordures is the usual method of showing cadency and the undifferenced coat of the family already has a bordure. In civic heraldry, a chief of allegiance may be added to the top of the shield, particularly in German heraldry. This is a form of the ruling state's armory compressed into the space of a chief.

== In Italy ==
An Italian coat of arms with a yellow chief charged with a black eagle, denoting Ghibelline allegiance

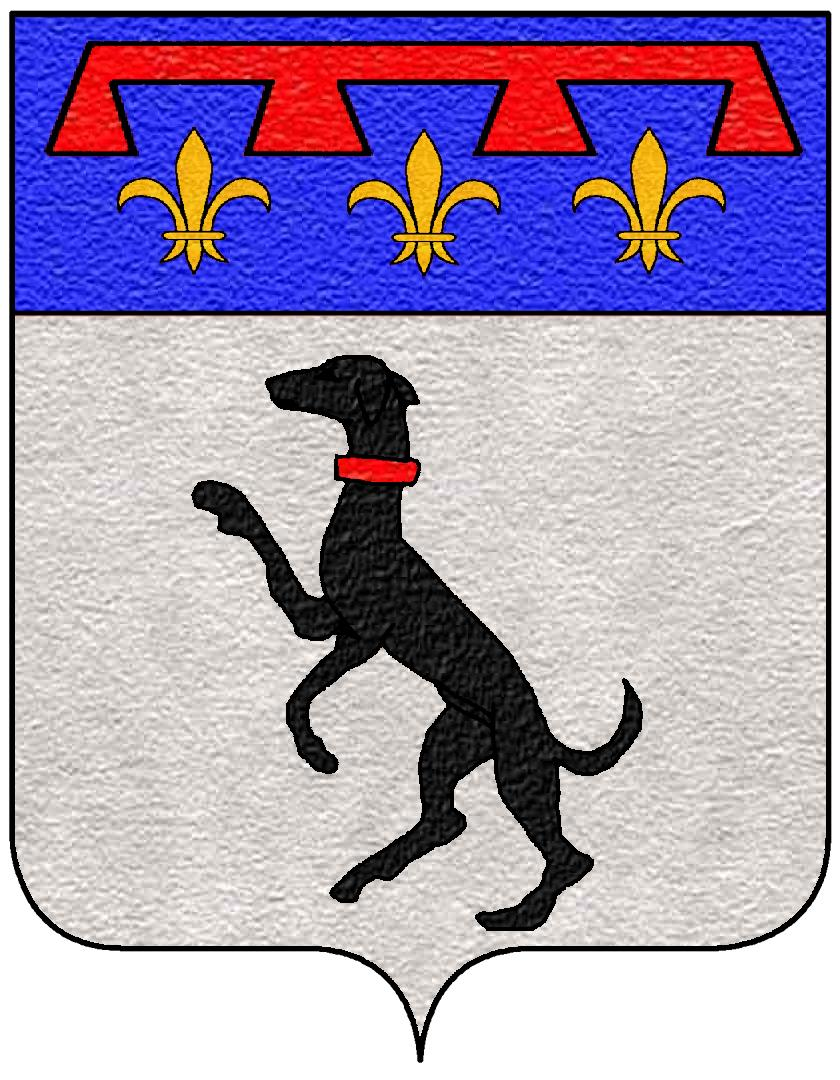
An Italian coat of arms with a blue chief charged with a red label and three fleurs-de-lys, denoting Guelph allegiance

The coat of arms of the Amhara Governorate used a red chief with a fasces, denoting fascist allegiance

In Italy, chiefs are added to the coats of arms of families or locales to indicate political orientation. For example, many Italian coats of arms have a chief containing a version of the arms of the Kingdom of Naples or of the Holy Roman Empire, to denote Guelph or Ghibelline alignment respectively. More recently, a chief gules charged with a fasces, called the Chief of the Lictor, indicated allegiance to the National Fascist Party; it was no longer in use by 1945.

== See also ==
- Fillet (heraldry)
- Ordinary (heraldry)
- Charge (heraldry)
- Liste de pièces héraldiques
