= Louis Joseph Sanson =

French surgeon and ophthalmologist (1790–1841)

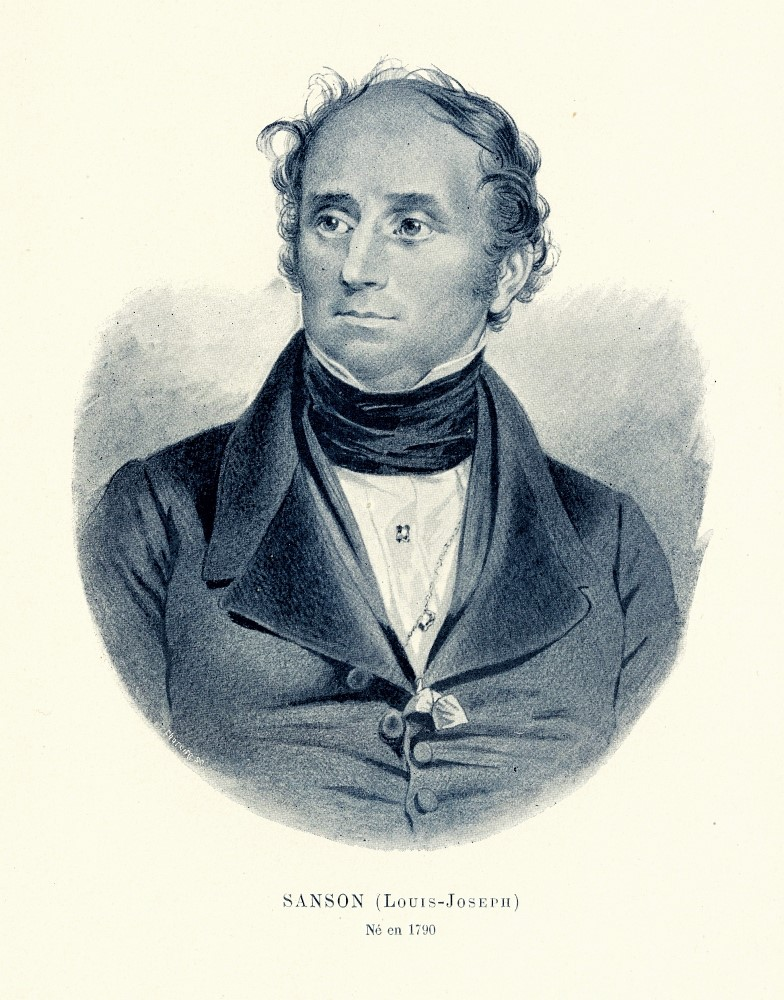
Louis Joseph Sanson

Louis Joseph Sanson (24 January 1790, Paris – 2 August 1841, Paris) was a French surgeon and ophthalmologist.

In 1817 he obtained his medical doctorate, later becoming a surgeon to the "Bureau central" (1823). During the following year he was appointed "second surgeon" at the Hôtel-Dieu de Paris, and in 1830 received his agrégation (professeur agrégé). For a period of time he served as head of the ophthalmologic clinic at the Hôtel-Dieu. In 1836 he succeeded his former teacher and good friend, Guillaume Dupuytren (1777-1835) as professor of clinical surgery.

His name is associated with Purkinje-Sanson images, being defined as catoptric images produced by reflections from the anterior and posterior surfaces of the cornea, and from the anterior and posterior surfaces of the crystalline lens. Term named in conjunction with Czech physiologist Jan Evangelista Purkyne (1787-1869).

== Written works ==
With Louis-Charles Roche (1790-1875), he published Nouveaux elements de pathologie medico-chirurgicale (several volumes, third edition- 1833), in which Sanson was the author of the books' surgical material, and with Louis Jacques Bégin (1793-1859), he published new editions of Raphael Bienvenu Sabatier's De la médecine opératoire. Other principal works by Sanson include:

- De la réunion immédiate des plaies, de ses avantages et de ses inconvénients, 1834
- Des hémorrhagies traumatiques, 1836
- Leçons sur les maladies des yeux, faites à l'hôpital de la Pitié Cataractes 1838.
