= Friedrich Schiller's skull =

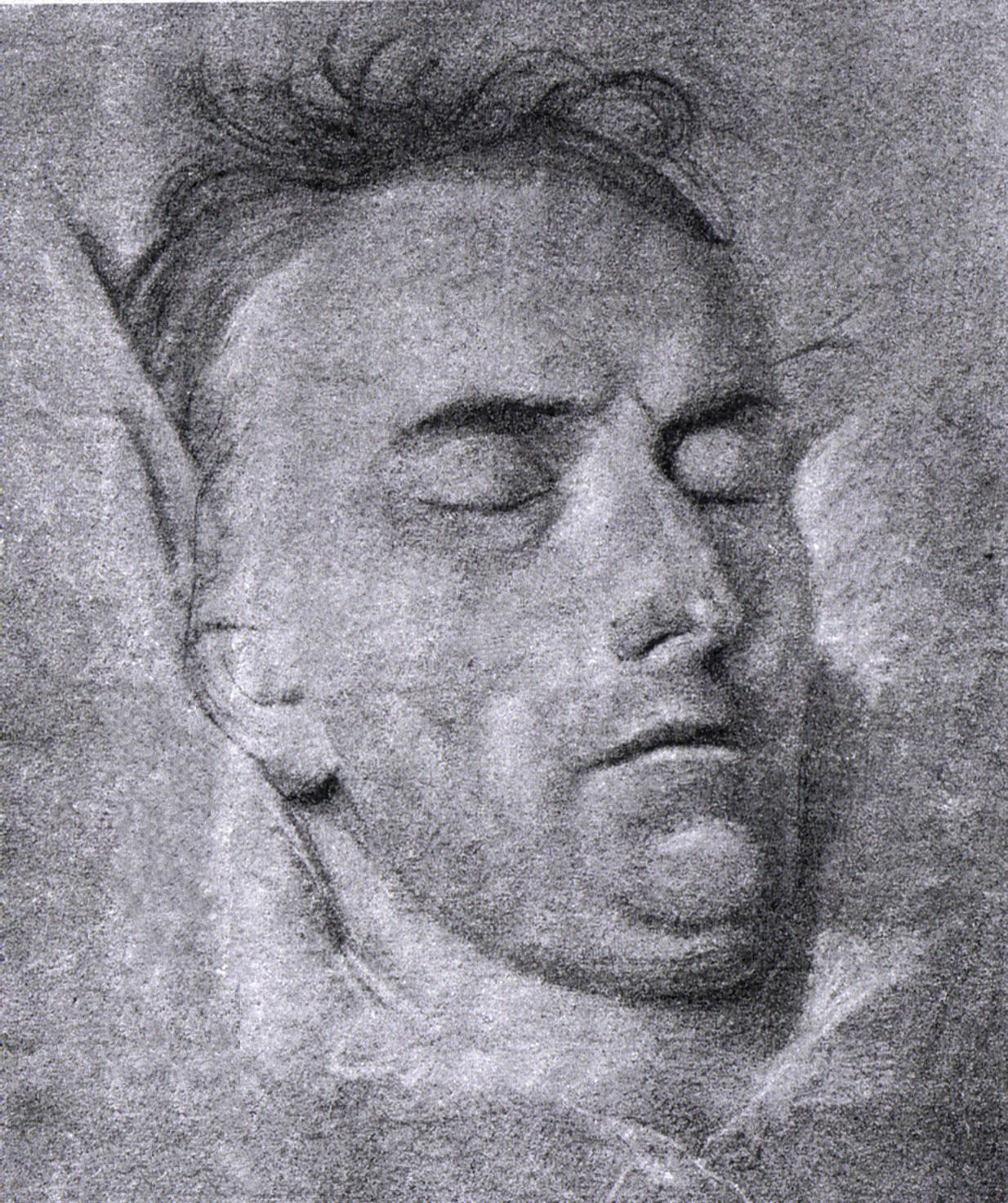
Schiller on his deathbed – a drawing by the portraitist Ferdinand Jagemann from 1805

Friedrich Schiller's skull has been the source of much controversy. Schiller was one of the most famous poets in German history. Long believed to be entombed in the Fürstengruft in Weimar, Germany, the location of the writer's skull is unknown.

== Death, burial and move to Fürstengruft ==
Three days after Friedrich Schiller died on 9 May 1805, he was hastily buried in a mausoleum for distinguished citizens whose families did not have a family grave, the Kassengewölbe, in Weimar's Jacobs cemetery. The burial was quick and unceremonious. There was, as the writer and Nobel Prize laureate Thomas Mann put it in 1955, "no mild sound of music, no word from the mouth of priest or friend". Schiller's widow Charlotte von Lengefeld had planned to move him to an individual grave later.

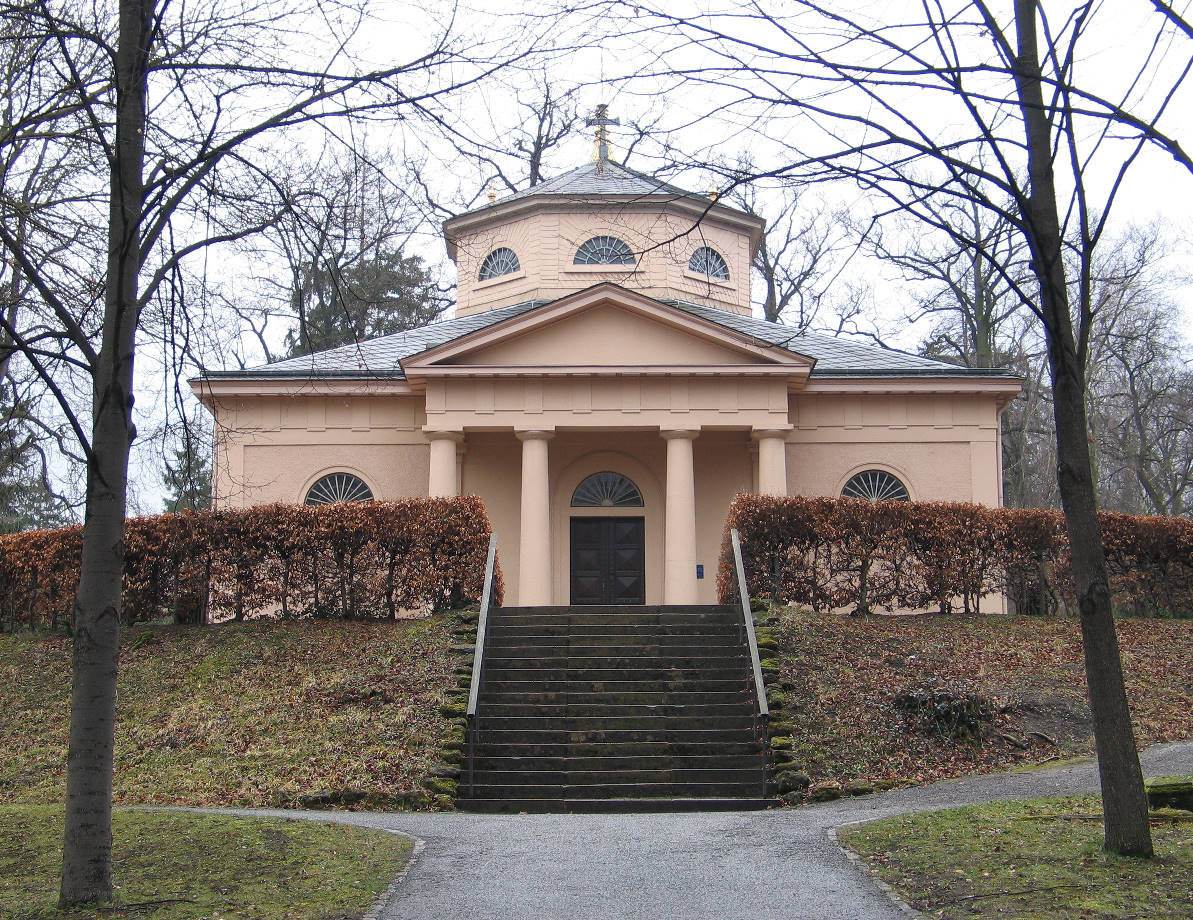
The Fürstengruft

However, the cheaply made coffin burst and his remains ended up mixed with those of other people in a mass grave. Twenty-one years later, in 1826, the town's mayor, Karl Leberecht Schwabe, an enthusiast of Schiller's writings, decided to dig up the poet's remains. He hired three day labourers and the cemetery's gravedigger to help. By that time, Schiller's body was decomposed beyond recognition. Schwabe reported that only smoking prevented him and his men from getting sick, as the stench of decay was so strong. He described the Kassengewölbe as a "chaos of decay and rot". Though not entirely legally, he unearthed a total of 23 or 27 skulls. Schwabe took them home, placed them all on a table and decided the largest must be Schiller's. Johann Wolfgang von Goethe, another famous writer and Schiller's friend, later secretly took the skull home, where he kept it on a blue velvet cushion underneath a bell jar and even wrote a poem about it entitled "Lines on Seeing Schiller's Skull" ("Bei Betrachtung von Schillers Schädel"). In the poem, he described the skull as a "mysterious vessel". The skull, along with the body believed to correspond to it, were then moved to the Weimarer Fürstengruft, Weimar's ducal vault, in 1827, to be joined by Goethe's remains in 1832 as a shrine to German Classicism.

== First doubts ==
The authenticity of the skull in the Fürstengruft was first questioned in 1883 by the anatomist Hermann Welcker. He claimed the poet's death mask and the skull did not match. Although experts agreed with him, laymen were outraged by his claims.

In 1911, rumours that Schwabe may have chosen the wrong skull started circulating. This led a group of scientists headed by August von Froriep to reopen the original mass grave and unearth another sixty-three skulls and pick one as Schiller's. In 1914, it was added to the Fürstengruft in an unmarked, inconspicuous, greyish-brown coffin to the side of the one containing the original skull.

During World War II, both Schiller's and Goethe's remains were moved to an underground bunker to protect them from Allied air raids. After the war, the Allies moved them back to Weimar. A decade later, East German scientists opened the sarcophagus once again and concluded that the first skull did belong to the writer after all.

== Friedrich Schiller Code ==
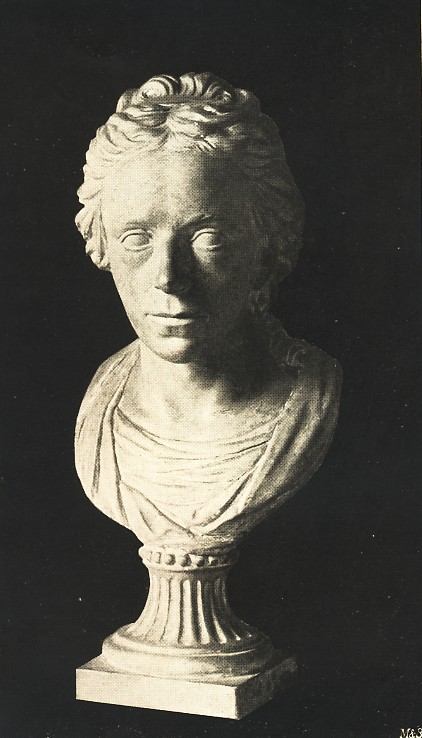
Bust of Luise von Göchhausen

At first resisting the idea, the Foundation of Weimar Classics, which oversees the Schiller archives and exhibitions, finally allowed scientists to analyze the skulls' DNA to reveal which is Schiller's in 2006, shortly before celebrations of the 200th anniversary of his death. Dubbed "The Friedrich Schiller Code", the study was sponsored by the foundation and the television station MDR. It was undertaken by an international team of scientists from the Universities of Freiburg, Jena, Innsbruck and others, led by Ursula Wittwer-Backofen. Among them were the scientists who had identified Mozart's skull, Ötzi the Iceman's skeleton and victims of the 2004 tsunami in Asia. The Foundation expected to prove that they did, in fact, possess the poet's remains.

First, anthropologists created forensic facial reconstructions of both skulls. The original skull recovered in 1826 matched portraits of the poet almost perfectly. The size and both two- and three-dimensional facial reconstructions matched the death mask. It was indeed extraordinarily large; only 1.5% of the population has a skull of this size and Schiller was also said to be tall. An analysis of the cementum of the teeth of the skull indicated an age of 39 to 52 at death, Schiller having died aged 45. All of this clearly indicated that the skull must indeed be Schiller's and those involved were reasonably sure it was. The skull from 1911, on the other hand, was exposed as a fake and later identified as belonging to Luise von Göchhausen, Duchess Anna Amalia of Brunswick-Wolfenbüttel's first Court Lady, whom Schiller knew and disliked. Scientists also took DNA samples from the bones, both the skull and the skeleton, in the casket on 14 July 2006. They were compared to samples from the teeth and thigh bones of Schiller's relatives, both of his second son, Ernst Friedrich Wilhelm and the poet's wife, Charlotte von Lengefeld, who were exhumed from Bonn's Old Cemetery, since there are no direct descendants still alive. To much surprise, it was announced in 2008 that both the Institute of Legal Medicine in Innsbruck and the Armed Forces DNA Identification Laboratory in Rockville, Maryland had concluded that the DNA did not match. In fact, the two skeletons together were shown to contain bones belonging to a total of six different people, but none of them to Schiller.

== Explanations of the disappearance ==
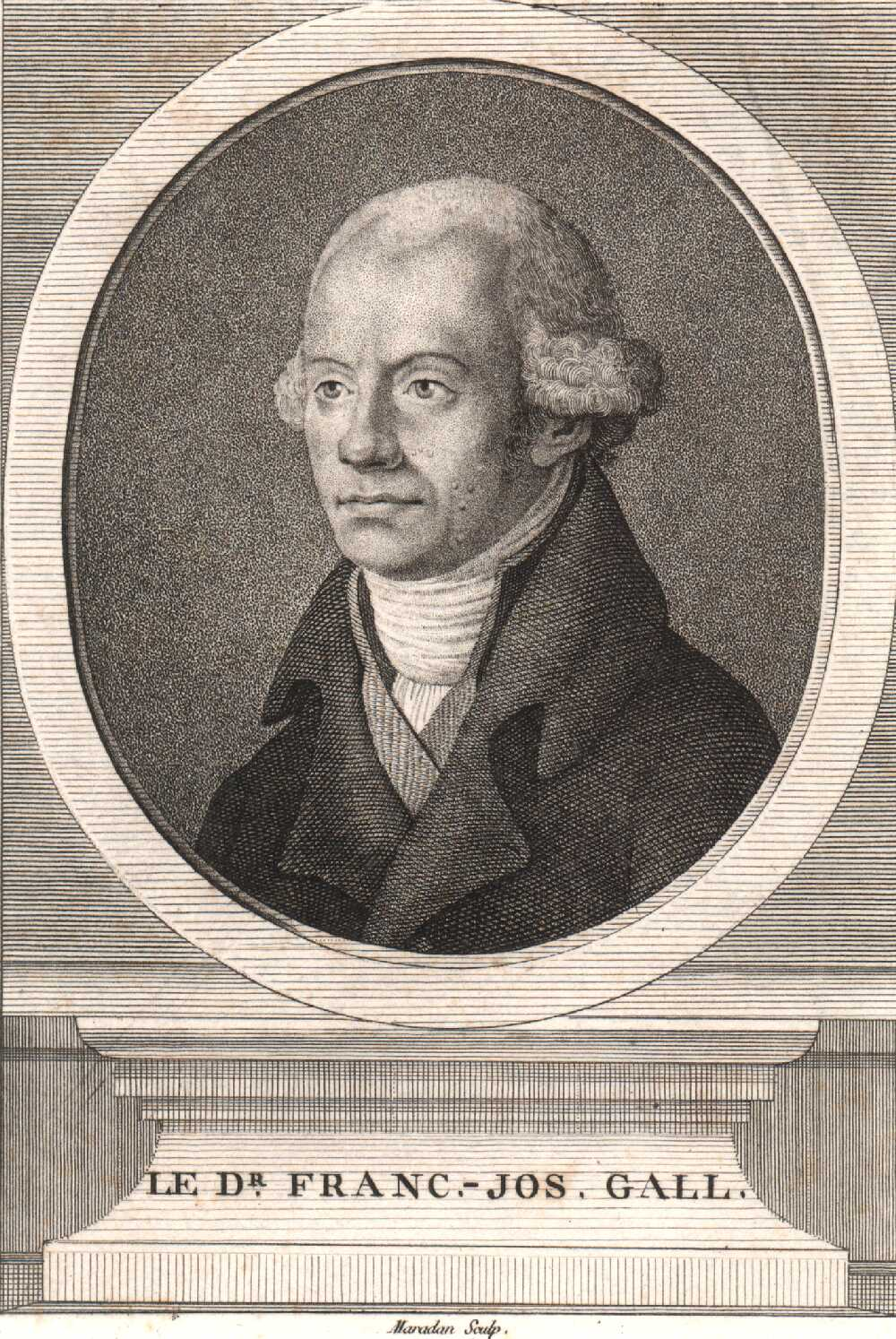
Franz Joseph Gall

There are several theories as to how Schiller's skull may have been lost. The anatomist Franz Joseph Gall is one; a notorious collector of skulls who believed it to be possible to determine a person's character by the characteristics of their skull, he travelled to Weimar shortly after the poet's death. Another is Ludwig Friedrich von Froriep, also an anatomist as well as the grandfather of August von Froriep, who unearthed the second skull in 1911. He could have stolen the skull from the Fürstengruft and then replaced it with one from his sizable collection. Another possibility raised by Ralf Jahn, a historian on the team of investigators and others is that Schiller's remains were stolen by grave-robbers in the 19th century.

The Foundation of Weimar Classics has announced it would not search for Friedrich Schiller's actual skull. According to Hellmut Seemann, the foundation's president, "for us the Schiller skull dispute is over. We only had to answer the question of whether either of the two skulls in the Fürstengruft was Schiller's or not." He added that "searching European anthropological collections for Schiller's skull is not the Classics Foundation's task."
