= François Joseph Herrgott =

French surgeon and obstetrician (1814–1907)

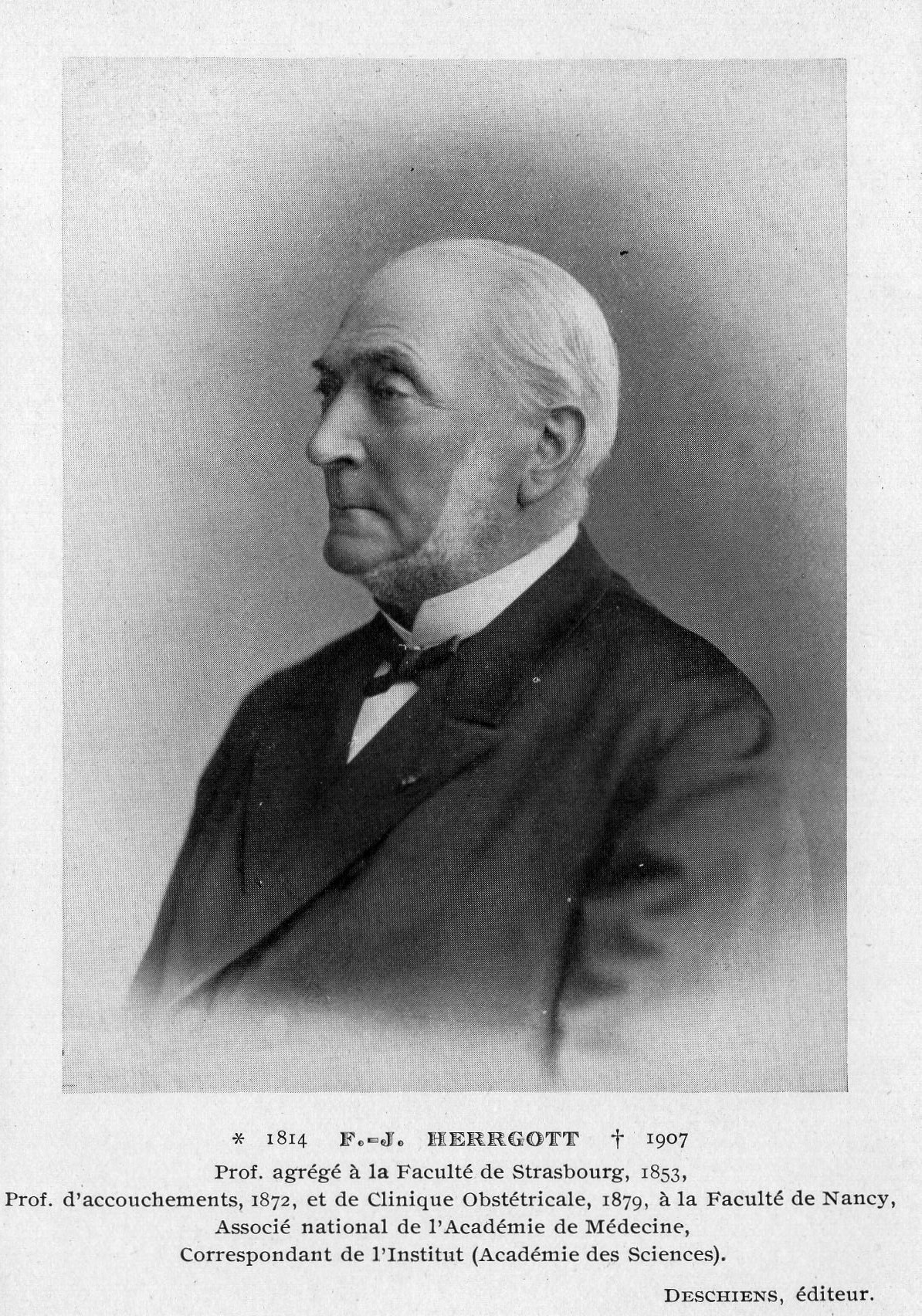
François Joseph Herrgott

François Joseph Herrgott (12 September 1814, Guebwiller – 4 March 1907, Nancy) was a French surgeon and obstetrician.

In 1839 he graduated from the University of Strasbourg, where he was a student of Louis Jacques Bégin (1793–1859) and Joseph-Alexis Stoltz (1803–1896). In 1841 he relocated to Belfort, where in 1849 he was appointed chief surgeon at the Hôpital de Belfort. In 1854 he obtained his agrégation at Strasbourg, later becoming chief physician of the Hôpital Civil in Strasbourg.

From 1872 he was associated with the Faculté de médecine at Nancy, where in 1879 he succeeded his former mentor, Joseph-Alexis Stoltz, as chair at the clinic of obstetrics. A few years later he was appointed director of the Maternité et de l'École départementale des sages-femmes.

== Written works ==
In addition to numerous medical papers, he was the author of translated obstetrical writings by Soranus of Ephesus, and a translation of the known historical work on obstetrics by Eduard Caspar Jacob von Siebold (1801–1861). Other noted writings by Herrgott include:

- Appréciation comparative des sections musculaires et tendineuses et des moyens orthopédiques, 1853
- Notice sur le docteur Lereboullet, 1866 - Records of Dominique Auguste Lereboullet (1804–1865).
- Des accidents dans la chloroformisation, 1869 - Accidents involving chloroform.
- Du Traitement des fistules vésico-vaginales, 1874 - Treatment of vesico-vaginal fistulae.
- Notice historique sur Semmelweiss et l'antiseptie, 1893 - Historical records of Ignaz Semmelweis (1818–1865) in regards to antisepsis.
- Le professeur Joseph-Alexis Stoltz, doyen honoraire de la Faculté de médecine de Nancy, 1896 - Professor Joseph-Alexis Stoltz, honorary doyen of the Faculty of Medicine in Nancy.
