= Raclin Murphy Museum of Art =

Coordinates: 41.6938°N 86.2351°W

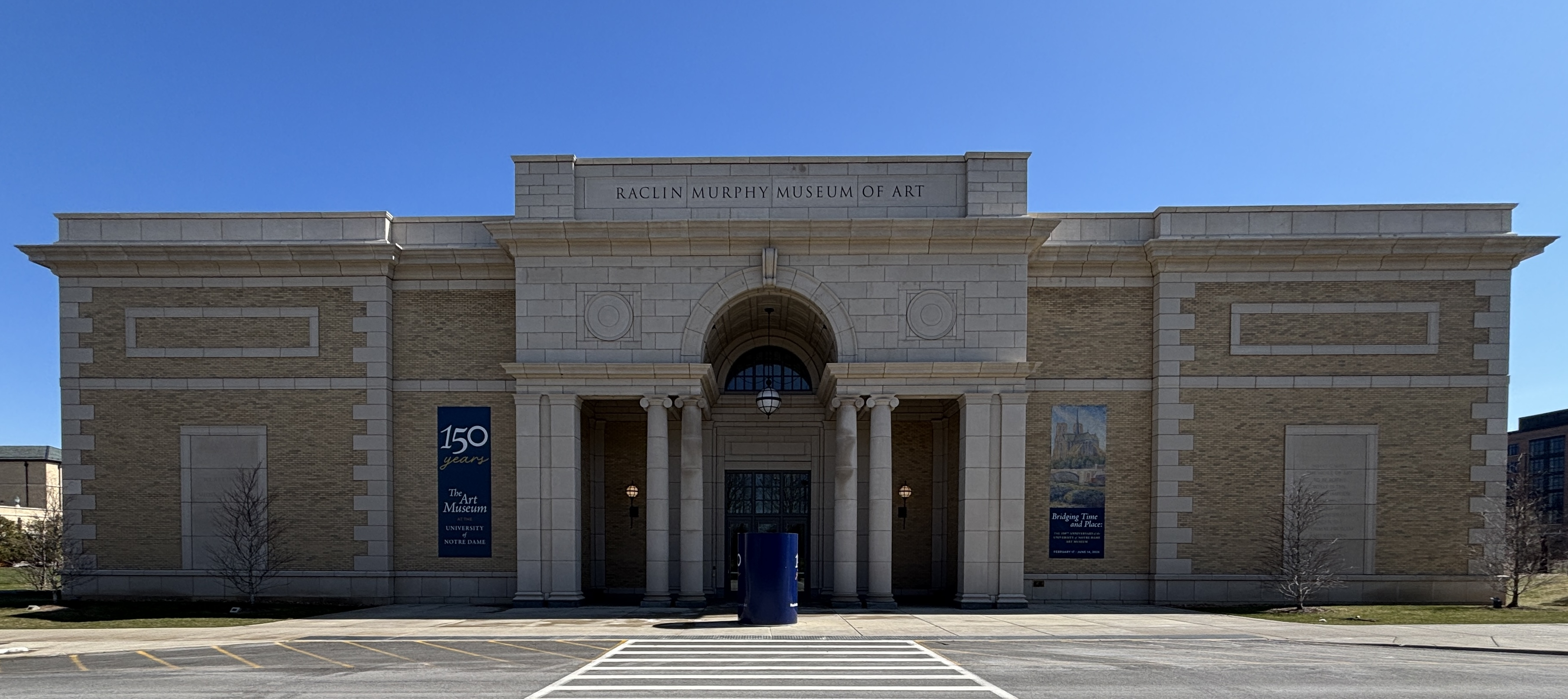
- Main entrance of the museum
- Established: 2023
- Location: University of Notre Dame campus, Indiana
- Type: Art museum
- Website: raclinmurphymuseum.nd.edu

The Raclin Murphy Museum of Art is the art museum of the University of Notre Dame, located on its campus near South Bend, Indiana. The museum occupies a new 70,000-square-foot building, which opened on 1 December 2023, and the surrounding Charles B. Hayes Family Sculpture Park. It holds the art collection of the University of Notre Dame, which was formerly housed in the Snite Museum of Art, which closed at the end of 2023. The more than 30,000 works of art in the collection span cultures, eras and media and include fine art, design objects, decorative arts, prints, drawings, textiles, photographs and art and artefacts from Mesoamerican, Spanish Colonial, Latin American, Mexican, Chicano and African cultures.

== History of the collection ==
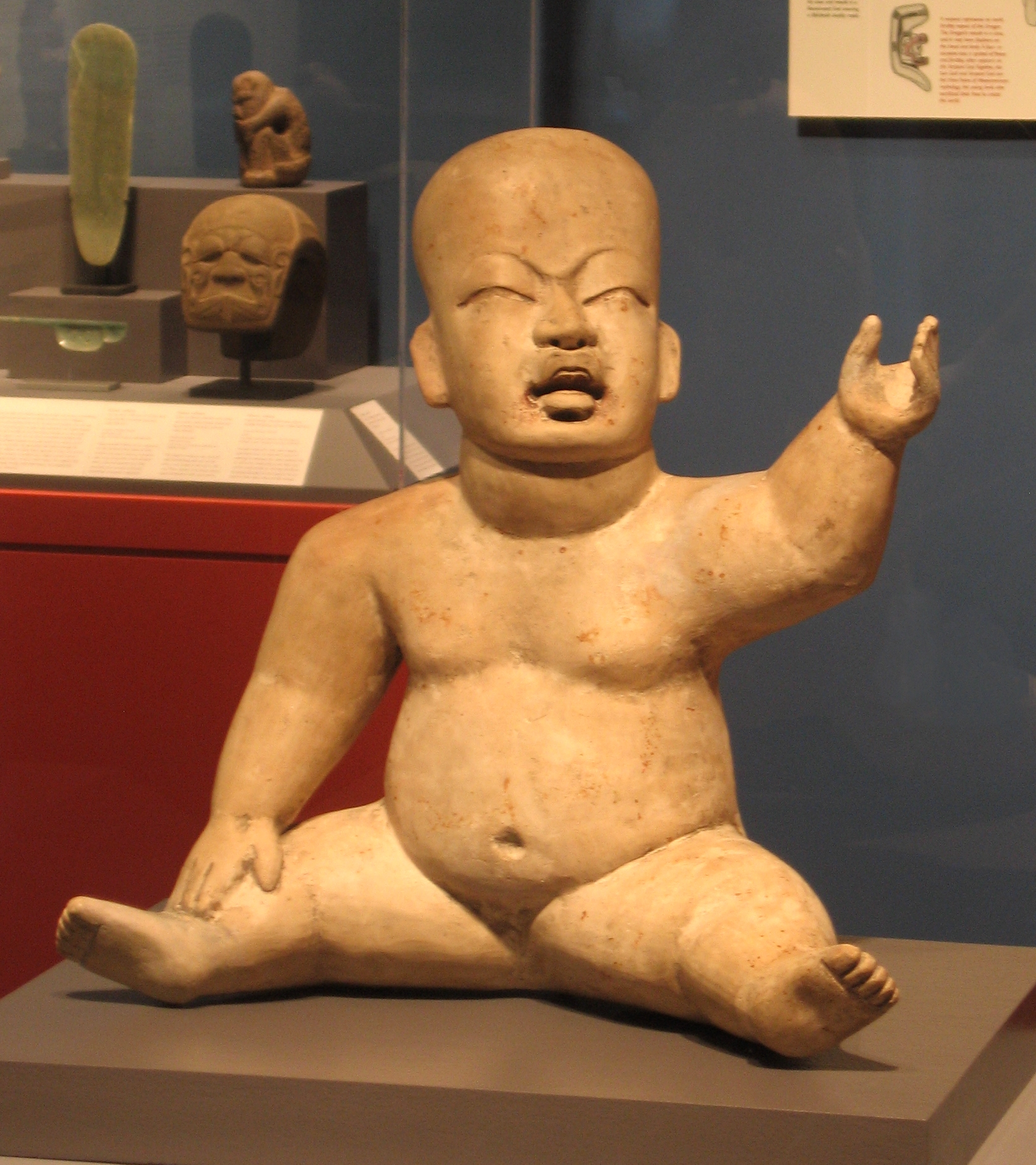
Olmec baby-face figurine

The Bishops Gallery, comprising 60 portraits painted by Vatican artist Luigi Gregori, and the Museum of Indian Antiquities were established in 1875 in the Main Building of the University of Notre Dame. The holdings of both collections expanded through small donations of art by priests and professors and the acquisition in 1917 by Rev. John J. Cavanaugh, the president of the university, of 136 paintings previously owned by the Braschi family of Rome. In 1917, the construction of the university's new library, Bond Hall, was completed. The second floor held four galleries displaying the university's art collection.

In 1924, Charles A. Wightman donated 108 paintings of religious subjects to the university's collection to commemorate his wife. As a result, the second floor spaces of Bond Hall were renamed in her honor as the Wightman Memorial Art Gallery. In 1952, Ignatius A. O'Shaughnessy donated funds for the construction of O'Shaughnessy Hall, a new home for the College of Liberal Arts of the university. It included the O'Shaughnessy Art Gallery, which opened in 1953 as an exhibition gallery for the university's art collections. During the 1950s, Croatian sculptor Ivan Meštrović was in residence at the university, working in the eponymous Meštrović Studio that was constructed especially for him.

In 1975, the Fred B. Snite family donated funds to construct the Snite Museum of Art for the university's art collections. The museum, housed in a 70,000 square-foot building designed by Ambrose Richardson, A.I.A., opened in 1980. The central three-story core bridged both Meštrović's adjoining sculpture studio and the O'Shaughnessy Galleries. The latter were used for the presentation of traveling and temporary exhibitions.

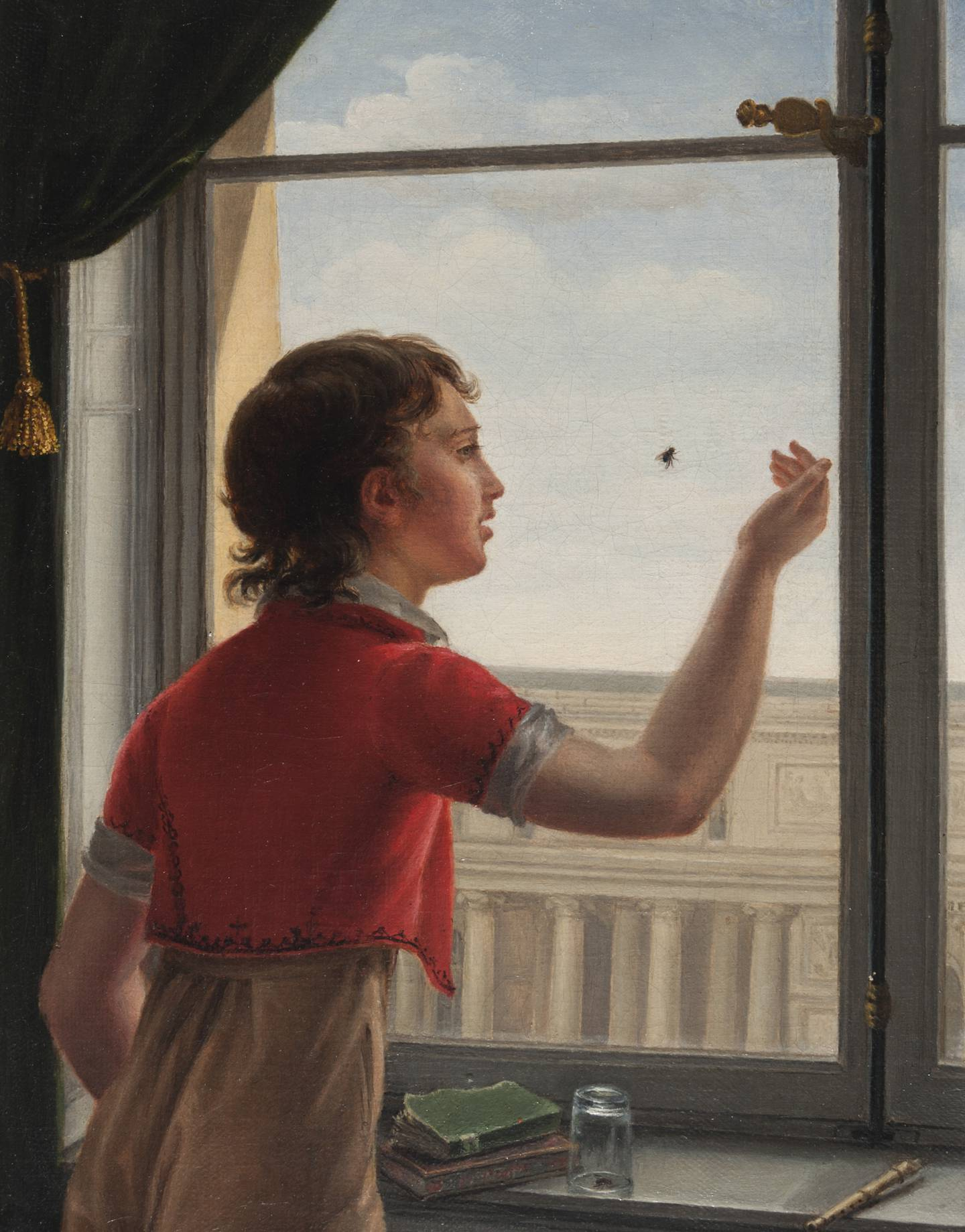
The Fly Catcher by Isabelle Pinson

== Museum building ==
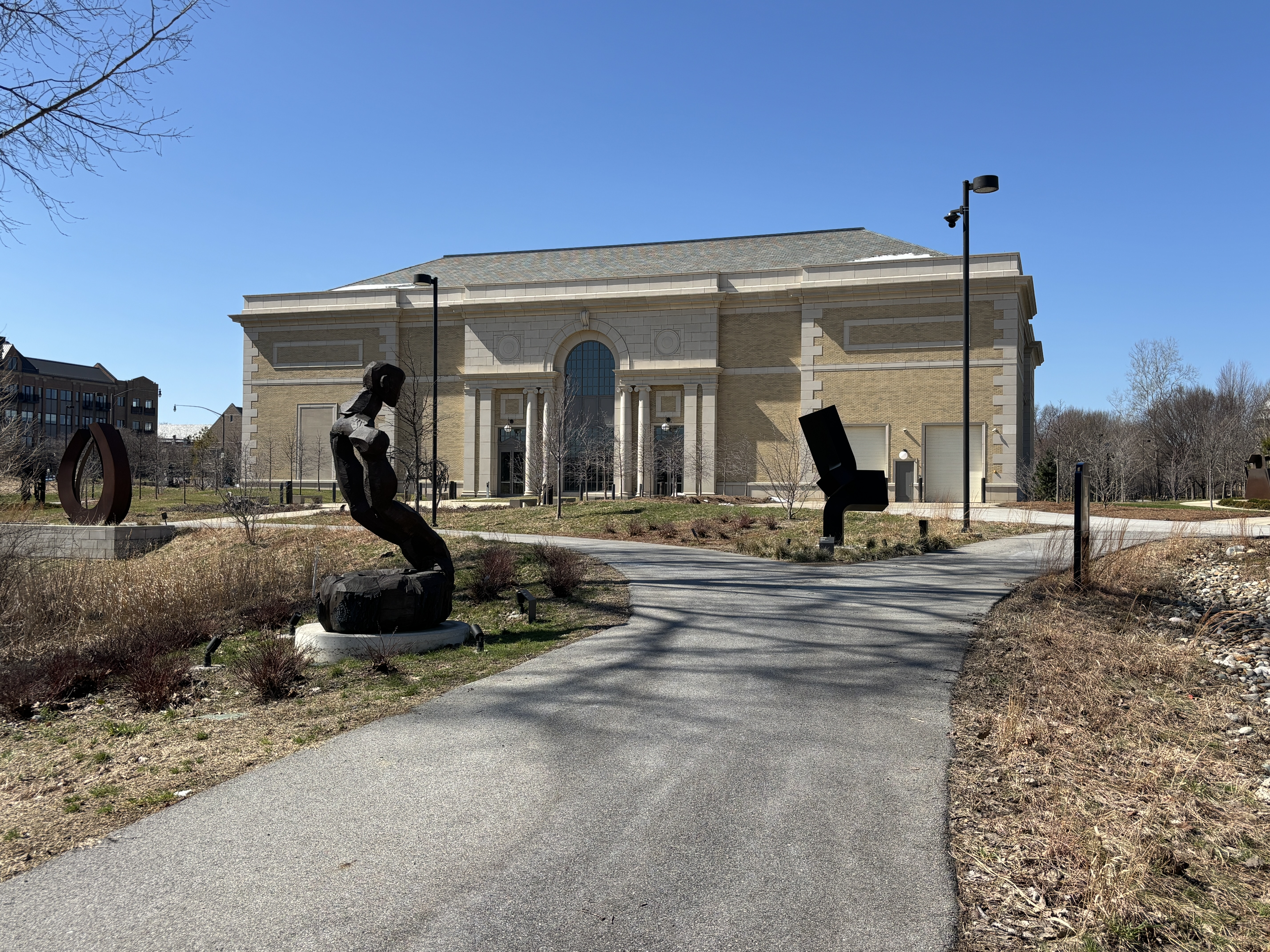
The Raclin Murphy Museum of Art from the Hayes Sculpture Park

A donation in 2018 from lead benefactors Ernestine Raclin and her daughter and son-in-law Carmen and Chris Murphy provided the necessary funds for the construction of a new museum complex to house the university's art collection. It was to be built in two phases on the south edge of the university campus. The first phase of the construction has been concluded and includes a building of approximately 70,000 square feet. It houses the museum galleries and other functions. The firm Robert A.M. Stern Architects designed the new museum. Construction of the first phase began in April 2020 and the Raclin Murphy Museum of Art was opened in the completed building on 1 December 2023.

The museum commissioned numerous works by globally renowned artist to feature prominently. Outside the entrance of the museum is a 36-foot stainless steel statue titled Endless by Jaume Plensa. The museum also includes commissioned works from Jenny Holzer, Kiki Smith, Maya Lin, Magdalena Abakanowicz, Zhang Huan, Julie Mehretu, Jamie Okuma, Yinka Shonibare, and Ursula von Rydingsvard.

The museum's collection is displayed in 23 historically themed galleries placed around a multi-level atrium that rises to a central skylight. Approximately 1,000 works from the museum's permanent collection are featured at any given time. The museum building includes a bookstore, the Our Lady, Queen of Families chapel, research venues, a gift shop, and Ivan's Café, which is named after the sculptor Ivan Meštrovic. Thanks to its location in the nine-acre Charles B. Hayes Family Sculpture Park, designed by the landscape designer Michael Van Valkenburgh, the site allows the museum to showcase its outdoor sculpture collection.

== Collections ==
The museum's holdings include photographs, old master paintings, drawings, prints, French 18th- and 19th paintings, decorative arts, textiles, African art, Olmec and Mesoamerican art, Native American art and international modern and contemporary art. Donated and gifted collections include the Jack and Alfrieda Feddersen Collection of Rembrandt Etchings, the Noah L. and Muriel S. Butkin Collection of 19th-Century French Art, the John D. Reilly Collection of Old Master and 19th-Century Drawings, the Janos Scholz Collection of 19th-Century European Photographs; the Mr. and Mrs. Russell G. Ashbaugh Jr. Collection of Meštrović Sculpture and Drawings, the George Rickey Sculpture Archive and the Virginia A. Martin Collection of 18th-Century Decorative Arts.
