= Radelj =

Radelj may refer to:

- Prelaz Radelj or Radl Pass, a mountain pass in the Alps
- Jure Radelj (born 1977), Slovenian ski jumper
- Radelj (Croatia), an island of Croatia

== See also ==
- Radel (disambiguation)
