= Pinson =

Pinson may refer to:

== Places ==
- Pinson, Alabama
- Pinson, Tennessee
- Pinson Mounds, a prehistoric site in West Tennessee

== People with the surname ==
- Bobby Pinson (born 1972), American country music artist
- Julie Pinson (born 1967), American actress
- Theo Pinson (born 1995), American basketball player
- Vada Pinson (1938–1995), American baseball player and coach
- Isabelle Pinson (1769–1855), French artist

== See also ==
- Mimi Pinson (1924 film)
- Mimi Pinson (1958 film)
- Richard Pynson (c. 1449–c. 1]]529), Norman-English printer
