= Marie Bourdereau =

French maid (1740–1823)

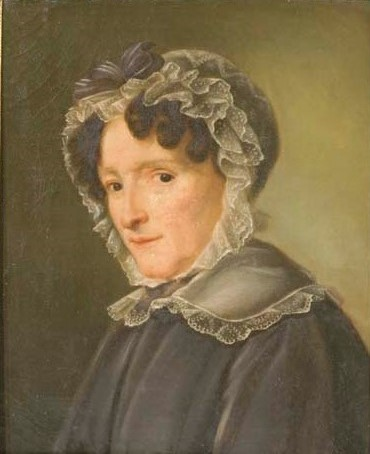
- Presumed portrait of Marie Bourdereau by Isabelle Pinson, 19th century
- Born: 11 January 1740; Brinon-sur-Beuvron, France
- Died: 9 January 1823 (aged 82)
- Other names: Madame Proteau
- Spouse: Fabien Proteau (m. 1768; died 1771)
- Children: Isabelle Pinson

Marie Proteau (Note: (French: [maʁi pʁɔto])) (née Bourdereau; 11 January 1740 – 9 January 1823), commonly known as Madame Proteau, was the wife of Fabien Proteau and mother of genre painter and portraitist, Isabelle Pinson.

== Biography ==
Marie Bourdereau was born in 1740, in the small village in Nièvre of Brinon-sur-Beuvron. She was the eldest daughter of Antoine Bourdereau and Barbe Paul.

In 1758, after the death of her parents, Marie and her six younger siblings were taken in by Isabelle de Jaucourt, sister of Louis de Jaucourt to Paris, France. As eldest, Marie became chambermaid to Isabelle. (Note: In 1783, after the death of Isabelle, her siblings became merchants and bourgeois of Paris.) Isabelle lived in a private mansion on the street of Rue de la Chaise.

=== Marriage ===
In 1768, Marie married Fabien Proteau, the valet of the Viscount de Jaucourt. In 1769, they had a daughter, Isabelle Pinson who was named after her godmother, Isabelle de Jaucourt.

On April 17, 1771, Marie became a widow, after 3 years of marriage, her husband, Fabien died. After the death of her spouse, Marie's daughter was cared for by Isabelle de Jaucourt. She received lessons from celebrated artists, Jean-Baptiste Regnault, François-André Vincent and Adélaïde Labille-Guiard. On 9 January 1823, at the age of either 82 or 83, Marie died.

== Bibliography ==
- Boulinier, Georges (1 October 1997). Une artiste à l'Ecole de Médecine de Paris: Isabelle Pinson (1769–1855) [An artist at the Medical School of Paris: Isabelle Pinson (1769–1855)] (PDF) (in French). Vol. 31. Histoire des sciences médicales. pp. 351–357.
- Boulinier, Georges (2004). "Notes biographiques sur le peintre Isabelle Pinson (1769–1855)" [Biographical notes on the painter Isabelle Pinson (1769–1855)]. Dix-huitieme siècle (in French). 36: 249–254. doi:10.3406/dhs.2004.2609.
