= Bégin Military Teaching Hospital =

- French Defence Health service
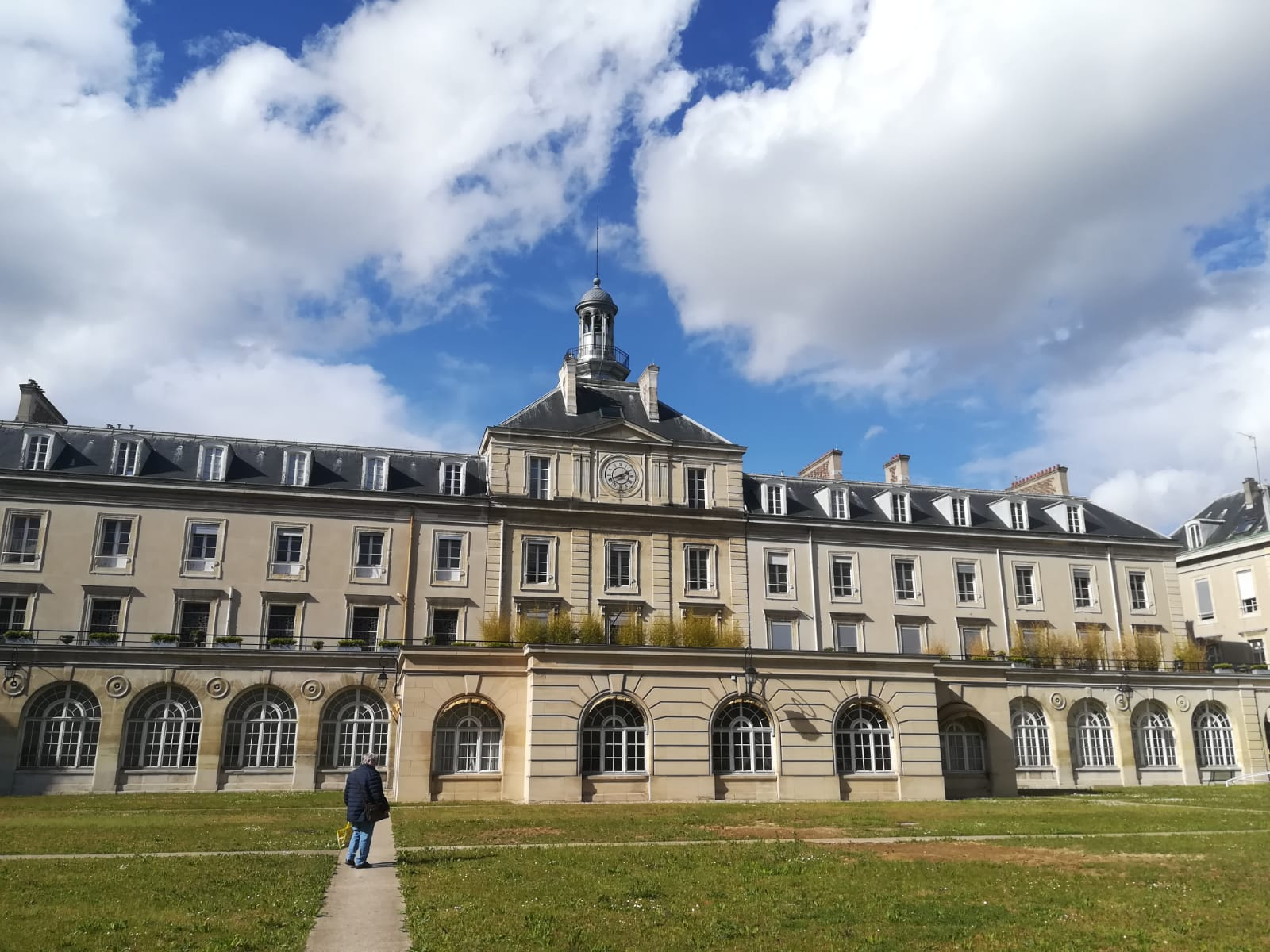
- Bégin Military Teaching Hospital Building

Geography
- Location: 69 Paris Avenue, Saint-Mandé, France
- Coordinates: 48.8436003°N 2.4265623°E

Organisation
- Type: Teaching

Services
- Speciality: Orthropedic Surgery, Cardiology, Endocrinology

History
- Founded: 1858

Links
- Lists: Hospitals in France

Bégin Military Teaching Hospital (French: Hôpital d'instruction des armées Bégin) is a military hospital at 69, avenue de Paris, in Saint-Mandé in the Val-de-Marne, near Paris. It is named after Louis Jacques Bégin, military surgeon of the French Empire.

== History ==
Bégin Military Teaching Hospital was created by the order of Napoleon III on April 21, 1855, to help treat the wounded in the Crimean War.

It helped support the Val-de-Grâce hospital which experienced difficulties in accommodating all of the injured. The hospital was inaugurated on May 31, 1858, under the name of hôpital militaire de Vincennes (Vincennes military hospital). It was built on the former site of the royal menagerie of Vincennes Castle.
