= Philippe Petit-Radel =

French physician and writer (1749–1815)

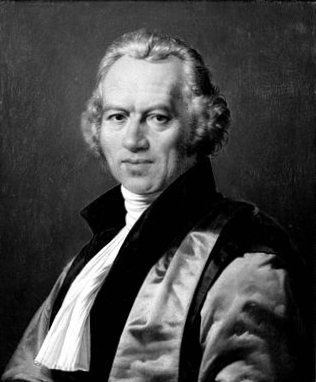
- Portrait of Philippe Petit-Radel by Isabelle Pinson. Black and white photograph
- Born: 7 February 1749; Paris, France
- Died: 30 November 1815 (aged 66); Paris, France
- Education: University of Paris
- Known for: "Surgery" volumes in the Encyclopédie méthodique
- Children: None
- Scientific career
- Fields: Physician, anatomist, writer, translator
- Workplaces: University of Paris
- Thesis: (1811 or 1812)

Philippe Petit-Radel (Paris, 7 February 1749 – 30 November 1815) was a French physician, surgeon and writer, editor of the two volumes devoted to Surgery by the Encyclopédie méthodique.

== Biography ==
At the age of seventeen, he was awarded a Master of Arts degree and entered the Hôpital de la Charité. After obtaining a medal, he was appointed assistant major at the Invalides and continued his medical and surgical studies under the direction of Sabatier. (Note: He was not able to study surgery at Val-de-Grâce because it was with the Revolution that the whole of Val-de-Grâce became a military hospital: the regulation of 30 Floréal year IV (19 May 1796) transformed it into a training hospital; this was the birth of the Val-de-Grâce School.)

Appointed in 1774 as the king's surgeon-major for the French possessions in “East Indies", he held this post in Surat for three years and took the opportunity to perfect his English language skills, which later, in 1787, enabled him to publish several translations of English medical works. It was also in 1774 that he became a Freemason.

On his return to France, in 1777, he was awarded a doctorate in medicine at the University of Reims (Note: Some authors write Rennes (see Renseignements pour servir à l'histoire de l'Île de France jusqu'à l'année 1810)) and then in Paris (1781 or 1782). He opened a private school, and for two years taught anatomy and surgery. In 1788, he obtained the chair of surgery.

He was busy writing the volumes devoted to Surgery in the Encyclopédie méthodique with Daniel de La Roche, father of François-Étienne de La Roche, when the French Revolution broke out.

At the time of the insurrection of 10 August 1792, he abruptly left the French capital and fled to Bordeaux. He was teaching public classes there, when he was conscripted (Levée en masse) as a soldier and had to fight against the insurgents in the Vendée. But he managed to escape and in June 1793 he embarked on the Pigon an American ship which had been chartered for the Isle de France (Mauritius).

After a stay in this island, he went to Bourbon Island (Réunion), and remained there for about two years, until he heard that Captain Lewis, who had brought him from Bordeaux a few years before, was in the Isle de France. He went to join him there, and sailed with him to the "Great Indies", in April 1796. From there he went to the United States of America, again stopping at the Isle de France.

Returning to France for the second time in 1797, he resumed his medical studies and literary work. In 1798, he was elected to the chair of surgical clinic at the Paris School of Medicine, where he distinguished himself by his severity and his zeal to re-establish the ancient practice of speaking Latin.

He died in 1815 from a stomach disease. He lived Rue Monsieur-le-Prince, n° 10.

== Works ==
- Translation of The Anatomy of the Absorbing Vessels of the Human Body of William Cumberland Cruikshank (1787).
- Essai sur le lait, considéré médicinalement sous ses différents aspects ou histoire de ce qui a rapport à ce fluide chez les femmes, les enfants & les adultes, soit qu'on le regarde comme cause de maladie, comme aliment, ou comme médicament (in French). Boudet. 1786.
- De amoribus Pancharitis et Zoroae (in Latin). Molini. 1796.
- Érotopsie, ou coup d'œil sur la poésie érotique (in French). Patris. 1802.
- Institutions de médecine ou exposé sur la théorie et la pratique de cette science (in French). Paris: Agasse. 1801.
- Les amours de Zoroas et de Pancharis (in French). Paris: Patris. 1802.
- Translation of Callimachus (1808). Hymnes de Callimaque le Cyrénéen, traduits du grec en vers latins, de même mesure que ceux de l'original, avec la version française, le texte et des notes, par M. Petit Radel (in French). Agasse.
- Voyage historique, chronologique et philosophique dans les principales villes de l'Italie et 1811 et 1812 (in French). Chanson-Didot. 1815.
