= Jean-Joseph Sue =

French surgeon and anatomist

Professor Jean-Joseph Sue FRS FRSE
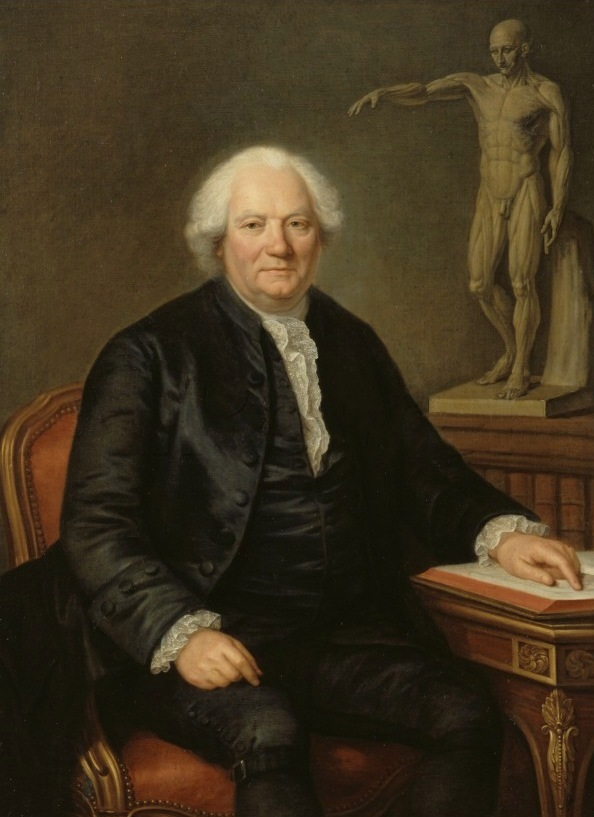
- Portrait by Guillaume Voiriot.

Personal details
- Born: 20 April 1710 La Colle-sur-Loup, France
- Died: 15 December 1792 (aged 82)
- Occupation: Surgeon, anatomist

Jean-Joseph Sue (French pronunciation: [ʒɑ̃ ʒozɛf sy]; 20 April 1710 – 15 December 1792) was a French surgeon and anatomist.

== Life ==
He was born at La Colle-sur-Loup on 20 April 1710 the son of Pierre Jean Sue (d.1714) and his wife, Marguerite Bellisime (d.1748).

Jean-Joseph Sue was a professor at the Collège Royal de Chirurgie and the Académie de peinture et de sculpture. He was the author of numerous treatises on anatomy and surgery, and is credited with the creation of approximately 200 anatomical plates.

In 1750 he published "Anthropotomie ou l'Art de disséquer", a book that is considered to be a classic work on androtomy (the art of dissection). Another important work by Sue was "Traité d'Ostéologie", which was a translation of Alexander Monro's treatise "Anatomy of the Bones". This translation is known for its exquisite, masterful engravings.

He was elected a Fellow of the Royal Society in 1760 and was a Foreign Founding Member of the Royal Society of Edinburgh in 1783. He was elected to the American Philosophical Society in 1779.

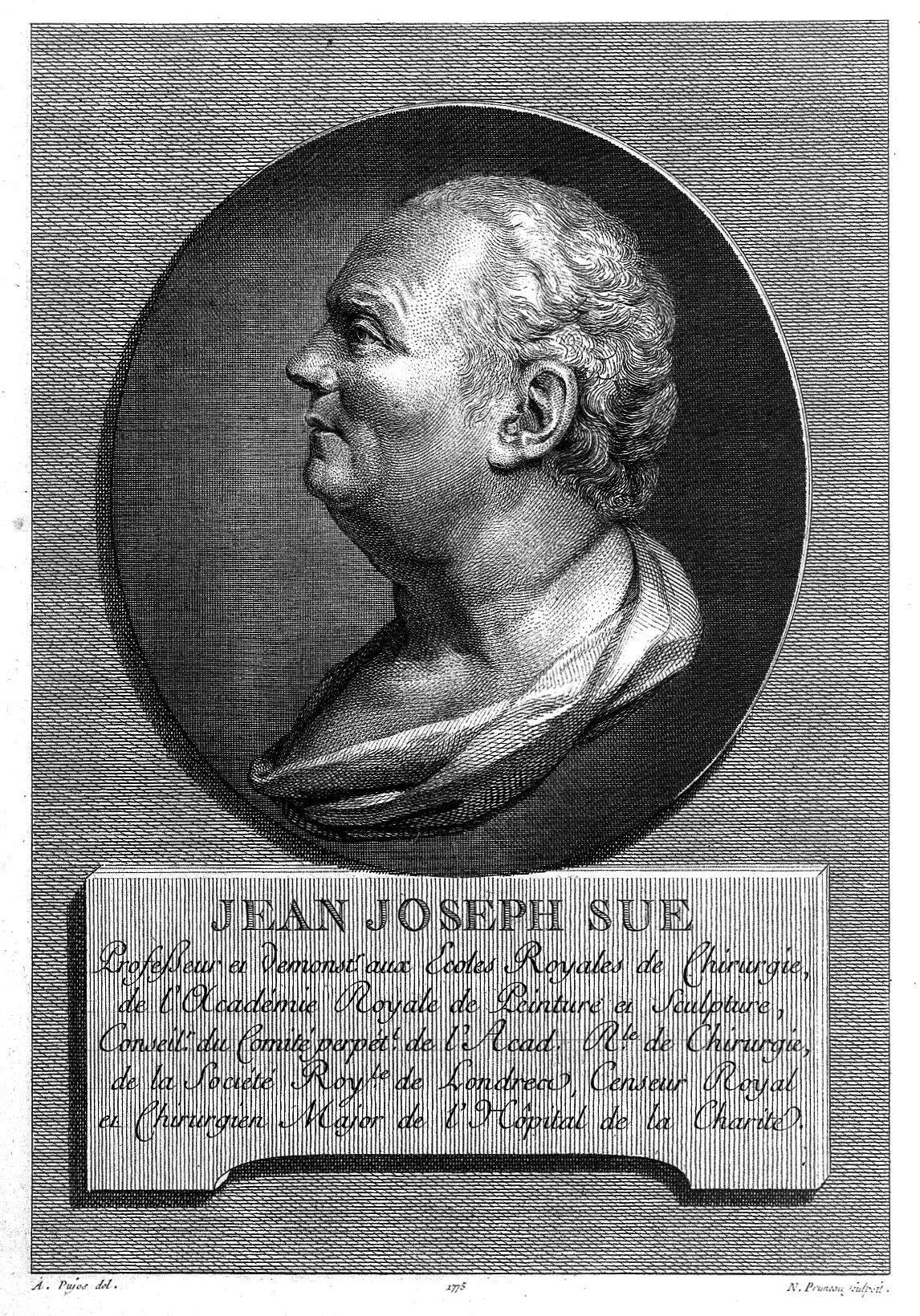
Line engraving by N. Pruneau, 1775, after André Pujos

== Family ==
He married Jeanne Angelique Martin de Martin.

His youngest son, also named Jean-Joseph Sue (1760-1830), was a noted anatomist and the grandfather of novelist Eugene Sue (1804–1857).

His eldest son, Pierre Sue FRSE (1739-1816) was also an anatomist.
