= Purkinje images =

Reflections of objects from the structure of the eye

Diagram of light and four Purkinje images

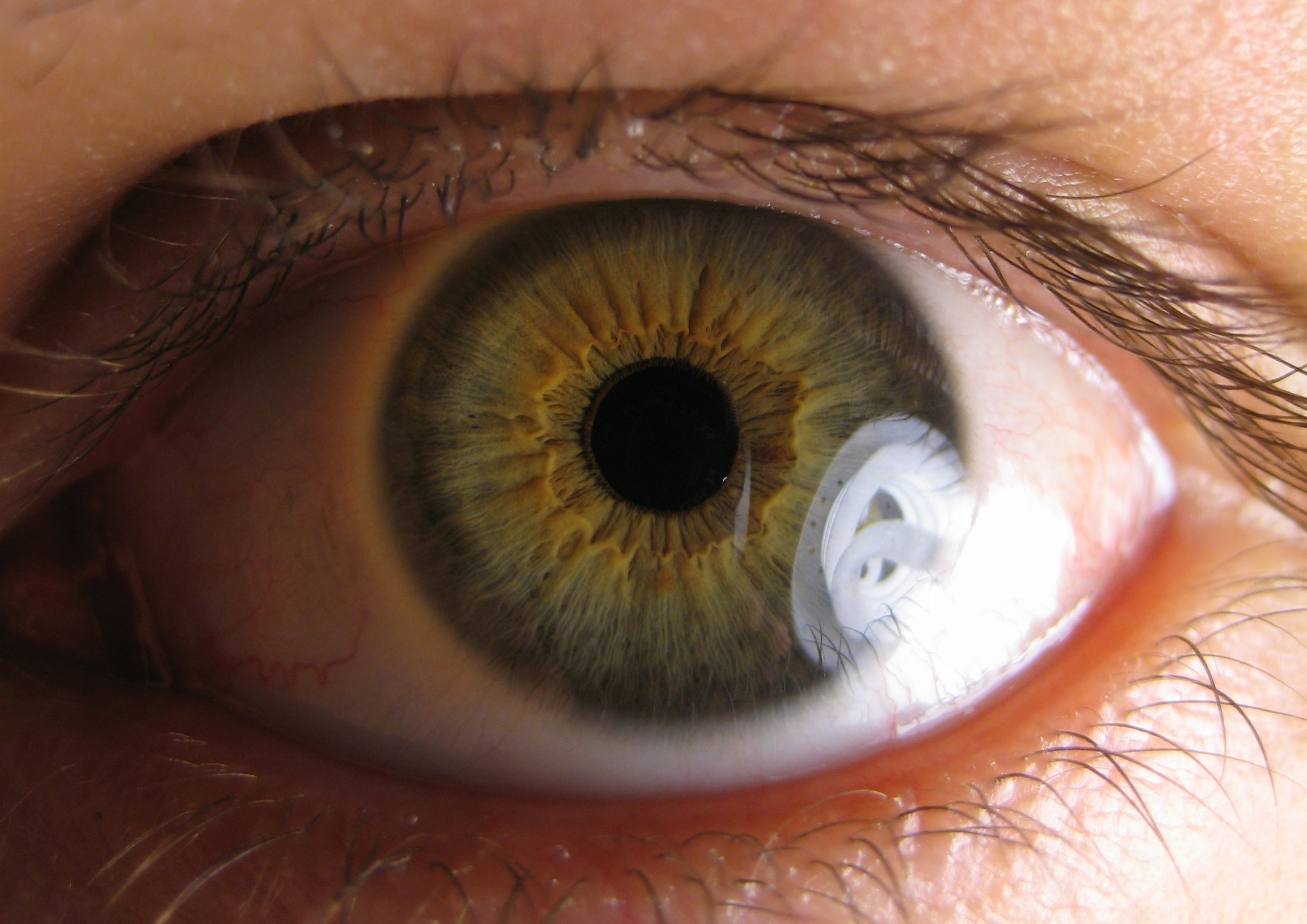
An eye with Purkinje images

Purkinje images are reflections of objects from the structure of the eye. They are also known as Purkinje reflexes and as Purkinje–Sanson images. At least four Purkinje images are usually visible in the normal eye. The first Purkinje image (P1) is the reflection from the outer surface of the cornea. The second Purkinje image (P2) is the reflection from the inner surface of the cornea. The third Purkinje image (P3) is the reflection from the outer (anterior) surface of the lens. The fourth Purkinje image (P4) is the reflection from the inner (posterior) surface of the lens. Unlike the others, P4 is an inverted image.

Purkinje–Sanson images are named after Czech anatomist Jan Evangelista Purkyně (1787–1869) and after French physician Louis Joseph Sanson (1790–1841).

The third and fourth Purkinje images can be visible from within the eye itself. Light reflected away from the surfaces of the lens can in turn reflect back into the eye from the rear surface of the cornea.

The first and fourth Purkinje images are used by some eye trackers, devices to measure the position of an eye. The cornea reflection (P1 image) used in this measurement is generally known as glint.

== Brightness ==
The brightness of the Purkinje images can be determined using Fresnel's equation: $\text{Intensity (brightness)} = (n'-n)^2/(n'+n)^2,$ where $n$ and $n'$ are the refractive indices before and after the reflecting surface. Purkinje image P1 is the brightest of the four, then P3 and P4 (P3 and P4 have about the same brightness), then P2. The Purkinje images can be used to assess the curvatures and separations of the surfaces in the eye.

== See also ==
- Red-eye effect
