= Rudolf Heidenhain =

German physiologist (1834–1897)

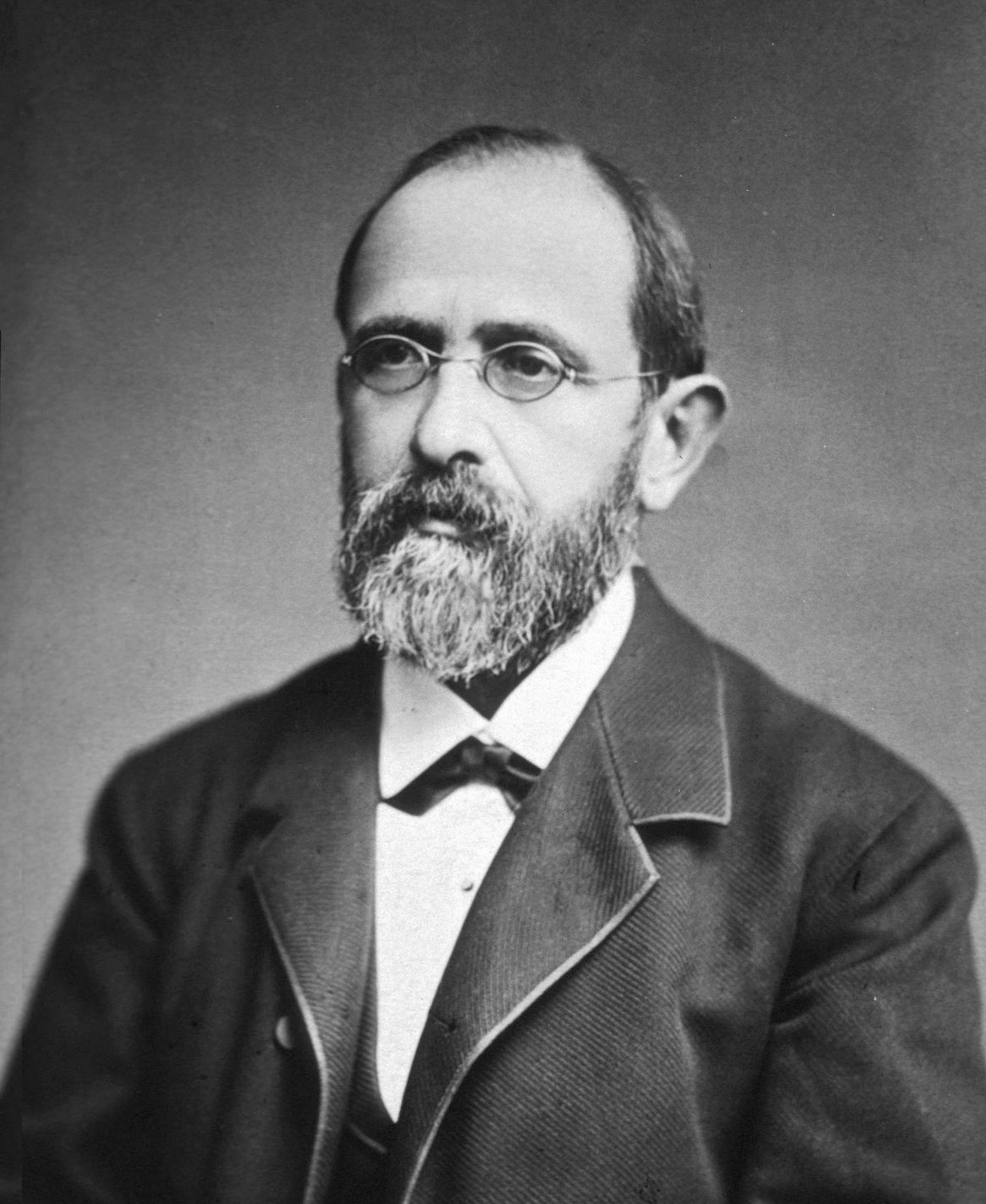
Rudolf Heidenhain taken in 1890

Rudolf Peter Heinrich Heidenhain (German: [ˈhaɪdn̩haɪn]; 29 January 1834 – 13 October 1897) was a German physiologist born in Marienwerder, Province of Prussia (now Kwidzyn, Poland). His son, Martin Heidenhain, was a highly regarded anatomist.

== Academic career ==
He studied medicine at the Universities of Halle and Berlin. After receiving his doctorate, he remained in Berlin as an assistant to Emil du Bois-Reymond (1818-1896). In 1856 he returned to Halle, and worked in the laboratory of Alfred Wilhelm Volkmann (1801-1877). While serving an assistant at Halle, he made improvements on Hermann Welcker’s procedure for measurement of blood volume.

In 1859 he attained the chair of physiology at the University of Breslau, where he remained for the rest of his career. Three of his famous students at Breslau were Karl Weigert (1845-1904), Ivan Petrovich Pavlov (1849-1936), and Albert Wojciech Adamkiewicz (1850-1921). His laboratory was the source of voluminous contributions by himself, his pupils, or his assistants to Pflügers Archiv on a large variety of special topics in the field of his studies.

== Work in muscle physiology ==
Heidenhain is remembered for his work involving muscle and nerve physiology, and contributions made in the study of physiological thermoelectrics. He demonstrated the muscles' self-regulatory process for expenditure of energy, as well as its ability to "economize" energy. Heidenhain showed that total output energy (heat and mechanical work) increases with an increased load, in other words, a muscle freed more energy when resistance to its contraction was greater. Also, when a muscle was fatigued, it had the ability to work more economically. Heidenhain's research also dealt with the study of heat production during muscular activity. He was able to detect and measure a small increase of temperature during the slightest muscular movement.

== Other contributions ==
Heidenhain did extensive research concerning the secretory and absorption processes of glands. He studied the stomach's gastric glands and the processes it used to produce pepsin and hydrochloric acid. The eponymous demilunes of Heidenhain were described by him. These are half-moon shaped cellular structures associated with the salivary glands.

Heidenhain conducted scientific studies of hypnotism, having been impressed by the public hypnotist, Carl Hansen. His research was from a physiological basis, and he explained hypnosis in terms of inhibition of the cortex. Later, Ivan Pavlov carried on Heidenhain's physiological studies of hypnosis.

== Written works ==
- Historisches und Experimentelles über Muskeltonus, 1856 - treatise on muscle tone.
- Beitrag zur Anatomie der Peyer’schen Drüsen, 1859 - Contribution to the anatomy of Peyer's glands.
- Physiologische Studien, 1856 - Physiological studies.
- Studien des Physiologischen Instituts zu Breslau, 1861–1868 - Studies of the Physiological Institute at Breslau.
- Mechanische Leistung, Wärmeentwickelung und Stoffumsatz bei der Muskelthätigkeit, 1864 - Mechanical power, heat evolution, and metabolism involving muscle activity.
- Die Vivisektion im Dienste der Heilkunde, 1879 - Vivisection in the service of medicine.
- Der sogenannte thierische Magnetismus. Physiologische Beobachtungen, 1880 - The so-called animal magnetism. Physiological observations.
- Die Vivisektion im Dienste der Gesundheit, 1884 - Vivisection in the service of health.

== Bibliography ==
- "Rudolf Heidenhain". Who Named It. Archived from the original on July 3, 2002.
- List of written works copied from an article on Rudolf Heidenhain at the German Wikipedia.
