= Louis Jacques Bégin =

French military physician

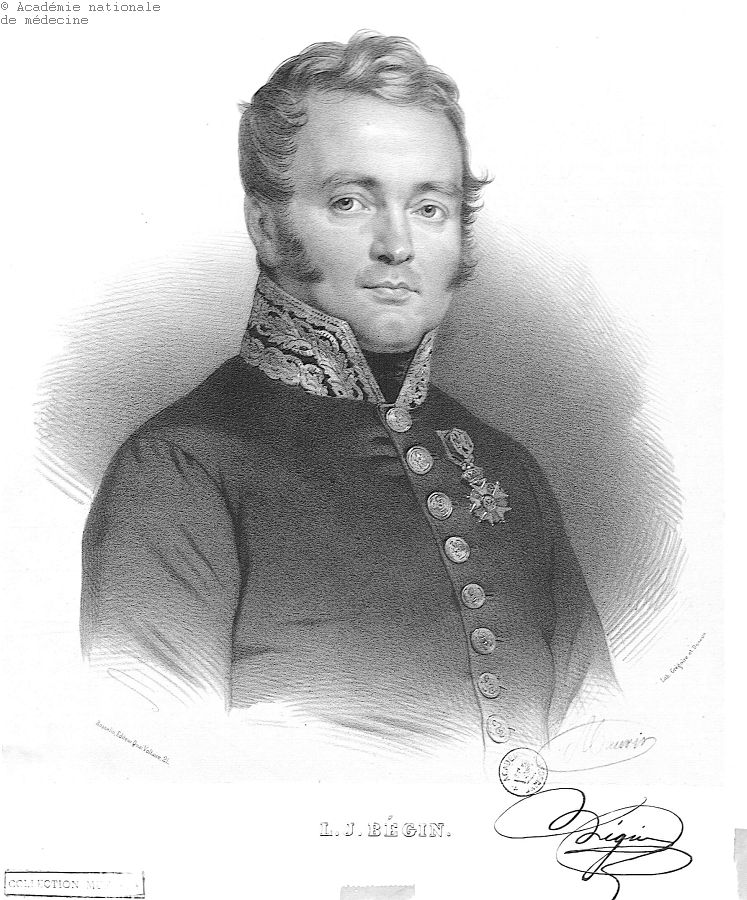
Louis Jacques Bégin

Louis Jacques Bégin (2 November 1793, Liège – 13 April 1859) was a French military doctor.

He began his medical studies in the military hospital at Metz, subsequently serving as an assistant surgeon in the Napoleonic Wars (Russian and German campaigns). From 1815 he was associated with the civil hospital in Strasbourg, followed by an appointment at Val de Grace. In 1823 he obtained his doctorate at the University of Strasbourg, where in 1832 he became a lecturer in anatomy, physiology and surgery. Among his students at Strasbourg was obstetrician François Joseph Herrgott (1814–1907). From 1835 he worked in Paris.

In 1832, he was appointed surgeon-major, and in 1842, he became a member of the Conseil de santé des armées (Sanitary council of the French armies), of which he served as president from 1850 to 1857. In 1847 he was elected president of the Académie de Médecine.

With Louis Joseph Sanson (1790–1841), he published new editions of Raphael Bienvenu Sabatier's De la médecine opératoire. Other noted writings by/about Bégin are:

- Traité Thérapeutique Rédigé Suivant les Principes de la Nouvelle Doctrine Médicale, two volumes, 1825.
- Traité de Physiologie Pathologique, two volumes, 1828.
- Etudes sur le Service de Santé Militaire en France, 1849.
- "Louis Jacques Bégin, 1793–1859: carabin de l'Empire" by Maurice Cren; Glyphe, 2009 – 403 pages.

The Hôpital d'instruction des armées Bégin in Saint-Mandé is named in his honour.

== Links ==
- Profile, JewishEncyclopedia.com
