= Jean-Joseph Sue (1760–1830) =

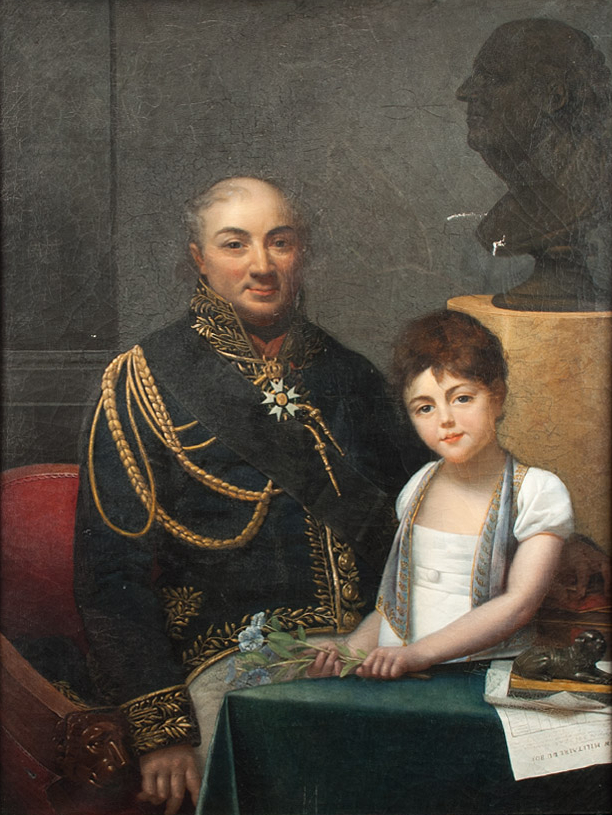
Adèle Romany, Jean-Joseph Sue and his son, circa 1810

Jean-Joseph Sue (French pronunciation: [ʒɑ̃ ʒozɛf sy]) or Jean-Joseph Sue (son) FRCPE (28 January 1760 – 21 April 1830) was a French medical doctor and surgeon during the Napoleonic Era. He was the father of Eugène Sue.

== Biography ==
He was born in Paris. His father was Jean-Joseph Sue père (1710–1792), who came from a 14 physicians family since Louis XIV. He received the Master of Surgery from the University of Paris in 1781 then earned his M.D. from the Royal College of Physicians of Edinburgh in 1783. His elder brother was Pierre Sue.

He did not succeed his father to the Hôpital de la Charité where he only took a position of surgeon substitute but he retrieved his father's professorship of anatomy at the Académie royale de peinture et de sculpture, where he served as professor from 8 March 1789. He also taught anatomy at the Atheneum and the Royal School of surgery, and delivered his care to a thriving clientele in its own cabinet.

Sue did not hesitate to take a responsible position as a citizen and a doctor before the National Convention. He was opposed to the guillotine, convinced of the suffering of the beheaded in each piece of his body once the head separated from the body "because the impression of pain warns quickly the center of thought about what happens". Sue had conducted several experiments on animals following the controversial and sensational beheading of Charlotte Corday to prove his point. The physiologist Pierre Jean George Cabanis was not convinced that Sue's theory was correct.

In 1800, he was appointed Chief Medical Officer of the Consular Guard then Imperial Guard hospital by Bonaparte. For ten years, he succeeded in staying in France and avoiding the front. But in 1812, Napoleon decreed that the Chief Medical Officer was to accompany his Guard everywhere. Sue soon became very sick and was back in Paris in June.

He was knighted by Napoleon on 21 December 1808. He was the doctor of Joséphine de Beauharnais and of Joseph Fouché.

During the Restoration, he became Surgeon Consultant of Louis XVIII.

He died in Paris on 21 April 1830, and is buried in Bouqueval cemetery.

== Family life ==
Jean Joseph Sue II was married three times and had a total of five children. He divorced his first wife. Eugène and his sister Victorine were born from his second marriage with Marie Sophie Tison de Reilly or Derilly in 1803.

== Honours ==
- Knight of the Empire
- Officer of the Legion of Honor
- Fellow of the Royal Academy of Surgery
- Fellow of the Royal Academy of Medicine
- Member of the American Philosophical Society (1785)

== Works ==
- Jean-Joseph Sue (1797). Eléments d'Anatomie à l'usage des Peintres, des Sculpteurs et des Amateurs (in French). L'auteur. p. 52.
- Jean-Joseph Sue (1797). Essai sur la physionomie des corps vivants considérée depuis l'homme jusqu'à la plante (in French).
- Jean-Joseph Sue (1796). Opinion sur le supplice de la guillotine et sur la douleur qui survit à la décollation (in French).
- Jean-Joseph Sue (1803). Recherches physiologiques et experiences sur la vitalité et le galvanisme (in French). p. 19.
