= Radel =

Radel may refer to:

People

- Philippe Petit-Radel (1749–1815), French physician and botanist
- Siegfried Rädel (1893–1943), German politician
- Trey Radel (born 1976), American politician
- Radel Fazleev (born 1996), Russian ice hockey player

Other

- Radel Electronics, an Indian manufacturer of the electronic tanpura
- The commercial name of the polymer polyphenylsulfone (PPSU)

== See also ==
- Radell Lockhart (born 1979), American football player
