= Pierre Sue =

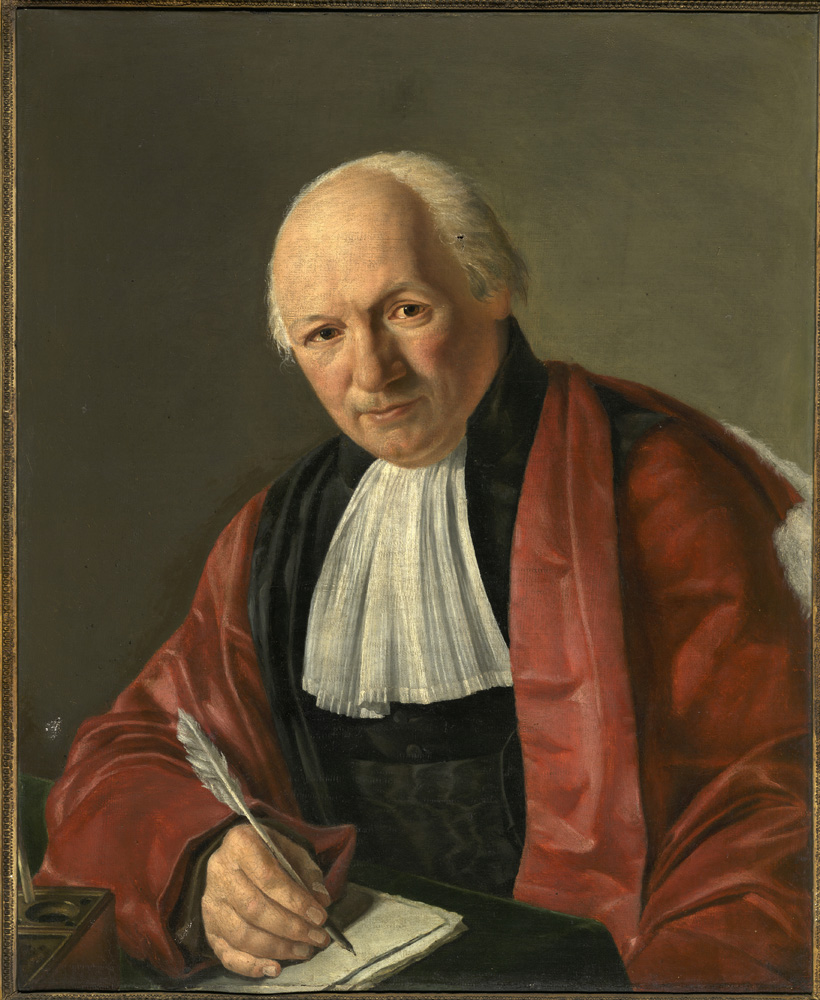
- Portrait of Pierre Sue, 1809, by Isabelle Pinson
- Born: 28 December 1739
- Died: 28 March 1816 (aged 76)
- Occupation: librarian, physician

Pierre Sue FRSE (28 December 1739 – 28 March 1816) was a French anatomist, librarian and physician.

== Life ==
He was born on 28 December 1739 the son of Jean-Joseph Sue and his wife, Jeanne Angelique Martin de Martin. His younger brother was Jean-Joseph Sue (1760-1830).

He qualified as a surgeon in 1763. In 1767 he became a Professor of Medicine in Paris. He was in this position through the French Revolution but in 1794 moved to the more sedate role of Librarian to the university.

In 1784 he was elected a Fellow of the Royal Society of Edinburgh. His proposers were Alexander Monro (secundus), Andrew Duncan, the elder and James Gregory.

He died on 28 March 1816.

== Publications ==
- Eloge de Louis (Elegy to Louis) (1792)
- The History of Galvanism (1805)
