= Guillaume Dupuytren =

French anatomist and military surgeon (1777–1835)

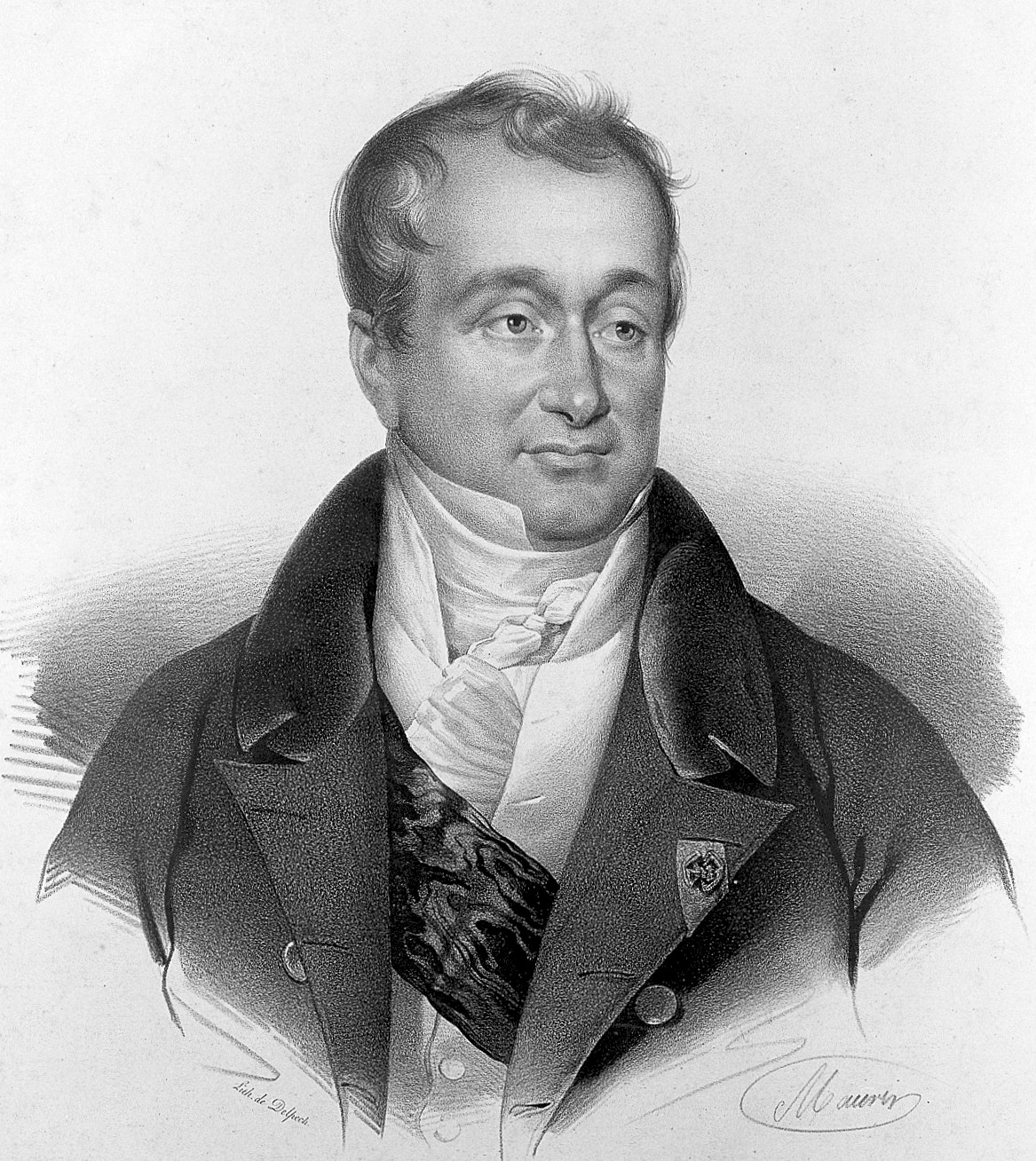
- Born: 5 October 1777; Pierre-Buffière, Kingdom of France
- Died: 8 February 1835 (aged 57); Paris, Kingdom of France
- Resting place: Père Lachaise Cemetery, Paris
- Education: University of Paris
- Known for: Dupuytren's contracture

Guillaume Dupuytren, Baron Dupuytren (UK: /ˌdjuːpwiːˈtræ̃, djuːˈpwiːtrɛn/, US: /dəpwiːˈtræ̃, dəˈpwiːtrən/, French: [ɡijom dypɥitʁɛ̃]; 5 October 1777 – 8 February 1835) was a French anatomist and military surgeon. Although he gained much esteem for treating Napoleon Bonaparte's hemorrhoids he is best known today for his description of Dupuytren's contracture, which is named after him and on which he first operated in 1831 and published in The Lancet in 1834.

== Birth and education ==
Guillaume Dupuytren was born in the town of Pierre-Buffière in the present-day department of Haute-Vienne.

He studied medicine at the newly established École de Médecine in Paris and was appointed prosector, by competition, when only eighteen years of age. His early studies were directed chiefly to anatomical pathology. In 1803 he was appointed assistant surgeon at the Hôtel-Dieu in Paris, and in 1811 he became professor of operative surgery in succession to Raphael Bienvenu Sabatier. In 1816 he was appointed to the chair of clinical surgery and became head surgeon at the Hôtel-Dieu, a post he held until his death. He is buried in the Père Lachaise Cemetery.

== Practice ==
Dupuytren visited the Hôtel-Dieu morning and evening, each time performing several operations, lectured to vast throngs of students, gave advice to his outpatients and fulfilled the duties consequent upon one of the largest practices of modern times. By his indefatigable activity he amassed a fortune, the bulk of which he bequeathed to his daughter, with the deduction of considerable sums for the endowment of the anatomical chair in the École de Médecine and the establishment of a benevolent institution for distressed physicians. The most important of Dupuytren's writings is his Treatise on Artificial Anus, in which he applied the principles laid down by John Hunter. In his operations he was recognized for his skill and dexterity and for his great readiness of resource.

Dupuytren was one of the first surgeons to drain a brain abscess successfully using trepanation, in which a hole is cut in the skull, and he also used the method to treat seizures.

He claimed credit for originally describing melanoma and claimed Laennec stole the idea from his lectures.

He reported a case of breast cancer spontaneous remission in which, after the patient refused surgery, the tumour becoming enlarged, rupturing and becoming infected, it began to shrink and disappeared after a few weeks.

He died in Paris and there with his bequest established the Musée Dupuytren.

He was a teacher, diagnostician and a surgeon. As a teacher, he was critical of students and colleagues who failed to live up to his professional standards. This won him numerous critics. He was described by such epithets as 'The Brigand of Hôtel-Dieu' by Jacques Lisfranc and 'First among surgeons, least among men' by Pierre-François Percy.

== In fiction ==
- The surgeon Desplein in Balzac's short story 'The Atheist's Mass' is based on Dupuytren.
- Dupuytren's success at draining a cerebral abscess is referred to in Gustave Flaubert's Madame Bovary: "not Dupuytren, about to open up an abscess through a thick encephalic layer" (Part Two, Chapter 11).
- Reference is made in Victor Hugo's Les Misérables: "Dupuytren and Recamier entered into a quarrel in the amphitheatre of the School of Medicine, and threatened each other with their fists on the subject of the divinity of Jesus Christ."
- In Diana Gabaldon's fifth book of the Outlander series, The Fiery Cross, pp. 1227–1229, Claire balances her future knowledge with current medical notes since the Baron Dupuytren has yet to be born.
- Stephen Maturin of the Aubrey–Maturin series received some of his medical training in Paris, conceding to have "dissected with Dupuytren" while there.

== Sources ==
- Gilgenkrantz, Simone (2006). "[The Baron Guillaume Dupuytren]" (PDF). Med Sci (Paris). 22 (8–9): 771–772. doi:10.1051/medsci/20062289771. PMID 16962055.
- Vayre, Pierre (2004). "[Guillaume Dupuytren 1777–1835]". Histoire des sciences médicales. 38 (1): 27–36. PMID 15209088.
- Gudmundsson, Kristján G; Jónsson Thorbjörn; Arngrímsson Reynir (July 2003). "Guillaume Dupuytren and finger contractures". Lancet. 362 (9378): 165–168. doi:10.1016/S0140-6736(03)13871-8. PMID 12867120. S2CID 40967720.
- Jay, V (2000). "Baron Guillaume Dupuytren". Arch. Pathol. Lab. Med. 124 (7): 955–956. doi:10.5858/2000-124-0955-BGD. PMID 10888769.
- Wylock, P (December 1997). "In the footsteps of Guillaume Dupuytren". Acta Chir. Belg. 97 (6): 277–280. PMID 9457317.
- Wylock, P (1990). "[Guillaume Dupuytren – 1777–1835]". Acta Chir. Belg. 90 (1): 1–4. PMID 2185601.
- Wylock, P (1989). "The life and time of Guillaume Dupuytren". Canadian Journal of Surgery. 32 (6): 473–477. PMID 2684377.
- Elliot, D (1988). "The early history of contracture of the palmar fascia. Part 2: The revolution in Paris: Guillaume Dupuytren: Dupuytren's disease". Journal of Hand Surgery (Edinburgh, Scotland). 13 (4): 371–378. doi:10.1016/0266-7681(88)90158-1. PMID 3074150.
- Towpik, E (1986). "[Guillaume Dupuytren – an outline of a biography (on the 150th anniversary of his death)]". Wiad. Lek. 39 (24): 1718–1724. PMID 3554771.
- Epifanov, N S (1986). "[Guillaume Dupuytren (on the 150th anniversary of his death)]". Khirurgiia (4): 151–152. PMID 3520110.
- Tubiana, R (1986). "[Guillaume Dupuytren]". Annales de Chirurgie de la Main. 5 (2): 169. doi:10.1016/S0753-9053(86)80035-7. PMID 3532978.
- Dufour, A (1984). "[Guillaume Dupuytren (1777–1835), Chief Surgeon of the Hôtel-Dieu]". Bull. Acad. Natl. Med. 168 (9): 1039–1050. PMID 6399468.
- Hauben, D J (1984). "[Our surgical heritage. Guillaume Dupuytren (1777–1835)]". Zentralblatt für Chirurgie. 109 (11): 765–766. PMID 6382875.
- Dupuytren, Guillaume (September 1982). "The classic. On osteo-sarcoma, spina-ventosa, and tubercles in bone: Guillaume Dupuytren". Clin. Orthop. Relat. Res. 450 (169): 4–14. doi:10.1097/01.blo.0000229310.28384.8c. PMID 16951640.
- Bloch, H (February 1981). "Guillaume Dupuytren, M.D. (1777–1835). Surgeon of Hôtel Dieu and his American students". New York State Journal of Medicine. 81 (2): 259–260. PMID 7007932.
- Kós, R (January 1979). "[Guillaume Dupuytren (1778–1835)]". Orvosi Hetilap. 120 (4): 230–232. PMID 366516.
- Mann, R J (1977). "Of Guillaume Dupuytren, who feared nothing but mediocrity". Mayo Clin. Proc. 52 (12): 819–822. PMID 339011.
- Lindskog, G E (1977). "Guillaume Dupuytren, 1777 to 1835". Surgery, Gynecology & Obstetrics. 145 (5): 746–754. PMID 333646.
- Lyons, J B (October 1975). "Pioneers in medicine: Baron Guillaume Dupuytren; 1777–1835". Nursing Mirror and Midwives Journal. 141 (16): 62. PMID 1105454.
- Goldwyn, R M (1969). "Guillaume Dupuytren: his character and contributions". Bulletin of the New York Academy of Medicine. 45 (8): 750–760. PMC 1750448. PMID 4895348.
- Goldwyn, R M (1968). "Guillaume Dupuytren". Plast. Reconstr. Surg. 42 (3): 195–202. doi:10.1097/00006534-196809000-00002. PMID 4878457. S2CID 220561076.
- Poynter, F N (April 1968). "Doctors in The Human Comedy (Guillaume Dupuytren, Jean Baptiste Bouillaud, François Joseph Victor Broussais, François Magendie)". JAMA. 204 (1): 7–10. doi:10.1001/jama.204.1.7. PMID 4867960.
- Théodoridès, J (1966). "[The amicable relations of A. von Humboldt with Guillaume Dupuytren]". Gesnerus. 23 (1): 196–201. doi:10.1163/22977953-0230102022. PMID 5331019.
- "Guillaume Dupuytren (1777–1835) – The Brigand of Hotel Dieu". JAMA. 189 (6): 509–510. August 1964. doi:10.1001/jama.1964.03070060119015. PMID 14162145.
- Peltier, L F (May 1958). "Guillaume Dupuytren and Dupuytren's fracture". Surgery. 43 (5): 868–874. PMID 13543661.
- Brown, Anthony Gary (2006). The Patrick O'Brian Muster Book: Persons, Animals, Ships and Cannon in the Aubrey-Maturin Sea Novels (2nd ed.). McFarland & Company. ISBN 978-0-7864-2482-5.
- King, Dean (1995). A Sea of Words: A Lexicon and Companion to the Complete Seafaring Tales of Patrick O'Brian. Henry Holt and Company. ISBN 978-0-8050-3816-3.
