= Isabelle Pinson =

French genre and portrait painter (1769–1855)

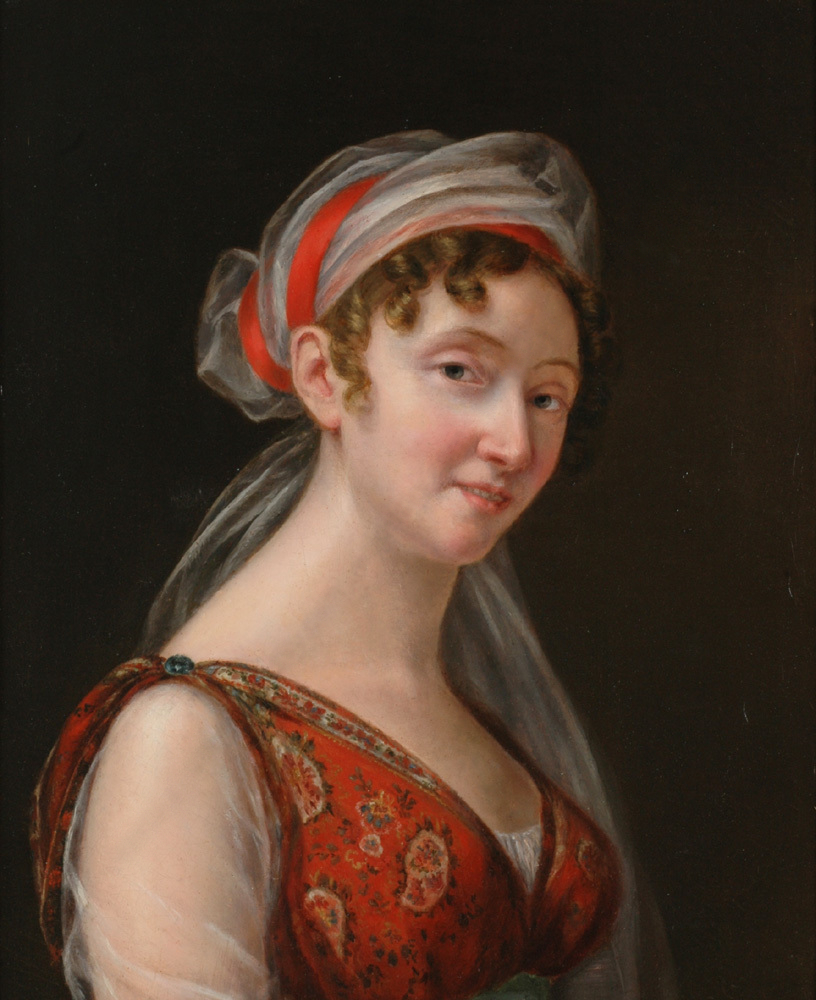
- Self-Portrait (1823), depicting her wearing a calico dress, owned by the Darblay family until it was sold at auction in July 2006.
- Born: Isabelle Proteau; 26 June 1769; Paris, France
- Died: 18 November 1855 (aged 86); Saint-Germain-lès-Corbeil, France
- Other name: Madame Pinson
- Known for: Painting
- Spouse: André-Pierre Pinson (m. 1792; died 1828)
- Mother: Marie Bourdereau

Isabelle Pinson (/ˈpɪnsən/, French: [pɛ̃sɔ̃]; née Proteau; 26 June 1769 – 18 November 1855), commonly known as Madame Pinson, was a French genre and portrait painter. She is best recognized for her artwork titled "The Fly Catcher" (1805), which was prominently exhibited at the Snite Museum of Art in 2019.

== Biography ==
=== Birth and background ===
Isabelle was born on 26 June 1769 in Paris, France and was baptized at the Church of Saint-Sulpice. She was named in honor of her godmother and her mother's employer, Isabelle de Jaucourt (1703–1783). Before her birth, her parents, Fabien Proteau and his wife, Marie Bourdereau, married in 1768.

Marie was a native of Brinon-sur-Beuvron. Eleven years prior to her birth, in 1758, Marie, along with her six siblings, were taken in by Isabelle de Jaucourt to live in her private mansion on Rue de la Chaise, where she took the role of chambermaid.

Fabien was a Burgundian from Genlis, Côte-d'Or; he served as a valet to the Viscount of Jaucourt until his passing on 17 April 1771.

=== Education ===
After the death of her father, Isabelle was taken under the care of her godmother. Having shown an aptitude for drawing at an early age, she received lessons from renowned painters Jean-Baptiste Regnault, François-André Vincent, and Adélaïde Labille-Guiard. It's possible Isabelle met Jean-Antoine Houdon from her early childhood with the Jaucourt family. (Note: In 1775, Houdon made busts of the Comtesse de Jaucourt, Elisabeth Sophie Gilly, and the latter's daughter, the young Comtesse du Cayla.)

=== Marriage ===
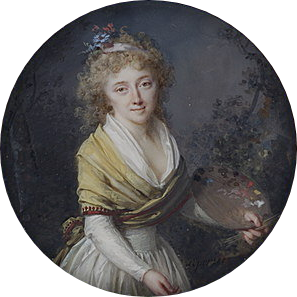
Portrait of Mme Pinson by Lié Louis Périn-Salbreux (1790s)

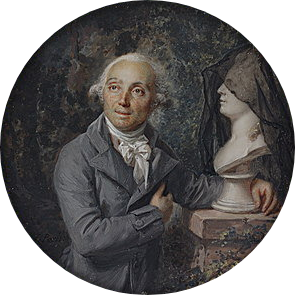
Portrait of M. Pinson by Lié Louis Périn-Salbreux (1790s)

On 19 July 1792, Isabelle discreetly married André-Pierre Pinson in a property he had purchased from Louis Philippe II, Duke of Orléans in the Clichy-en-Launois (now Clichy-sous-Bois). She was 23 and he was 32 years her senior.

=== Career ===
As a painter, Isabelle significantly distinguished herself as a portraitist. In particular, she produced portraits of medical personalities. She participated in the Salon for the first time in 1796, presenting three portraits. At the Salon of 1801, Isabelle exhibited a painting of Jacques-René Tenon.

Furthermore, a work by Isabelle Pinson is part of the collections of the Palace of Versailles. It depicts man of letters, Pierre-Noël Famin. It was offered at the museum in 1839 by Pierre-Jules Jollivet, a grandson of one of the sisters of Famin.

=== Later life and death ===
Isabelle Proteau
Widow of A.P. Pinson
Anatomist
Perfectly loved
by a virtuous husband,
her constant thought was to make him happy
Since then, she has honored his cherished memory
Pray for her.

— Epitaph of Isabelle Pinson

In 1811, Isabelle and her husband acquired a property called the "Ferme de Rochefort" in Saint-Germain-lès-Corbeil. On 19 July 1828, her husband died in the same village on their 36th wedding anniversary. On 18 November 1855, Isabelle died in Saint-Germain-lès-Corbeil.

== Artworks ==
=== Works by Isabelle Pinson ===
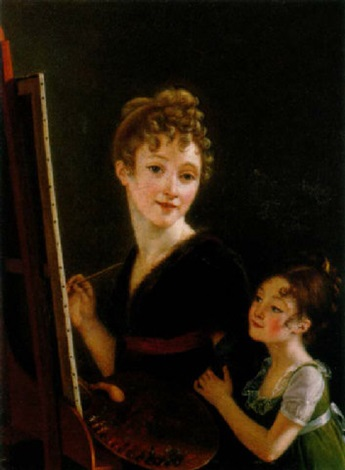
Self-Portrait at an Easel and With a Young Girl, 1804

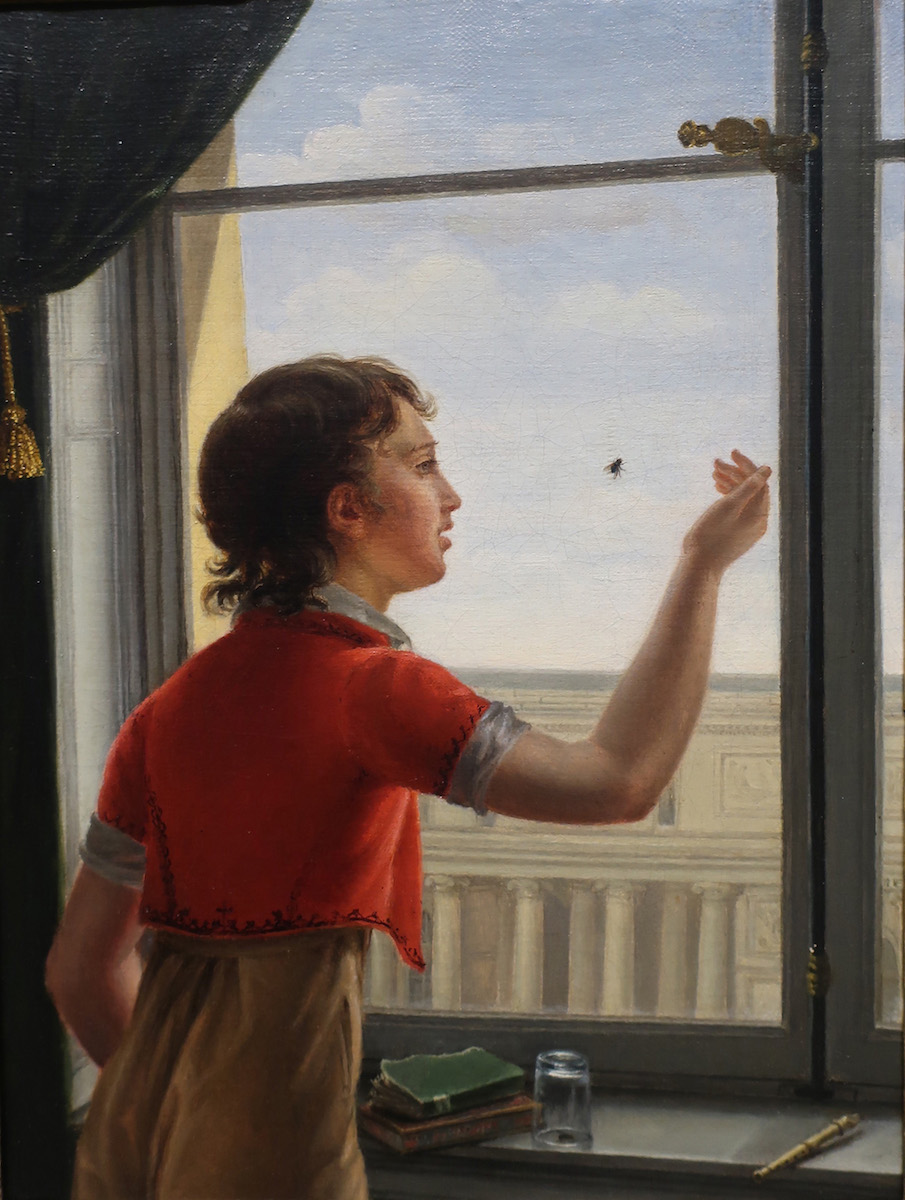
The Fly Catcher, 1808

Portrait of Pierre Sue, 1809

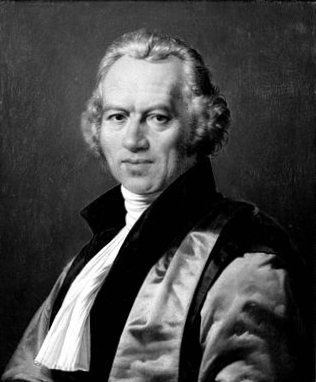
Portrait of Philippe Petit-Radel, before 1815

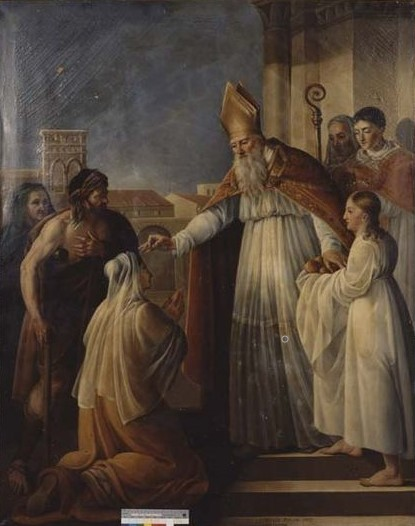
Meeting of St Germanus of Auxerre with Genevieve of Paris, 1821

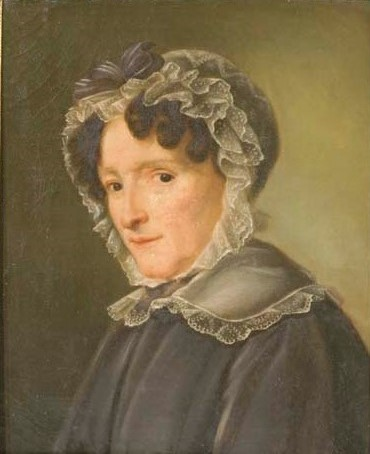
Presumed portrait of the artist's mother, Marie Bourdereau, widow Proteau, undated
