= Heidenhain's AZAN trichrome stain =

Staining method

Trichrome stains are staining methods in which three anionic dyes are used, in conjunction with either phosphomolybdic acid (PMA), phosphotungstic acid (PTA), or a mixture of these heteropolyacids. Probably the first trichrome method was that of Frank B Mallory, an American pathologist, first published in 1900. Unfortunately, none of Mallory's publications (they go from 1891 to 1938) provide any explanation of the rationales of either his trichrome or his phosphotungstic acid-haematoxylin (PTAH) method. Nobody knows why Mallory introduced heteropolyacids into microtechnique.

Mallory's trichrome method, using acid fuchsine followed by a solution containing PTA, orange G and aniline blue, provides dark red nuclei, orange erythrocytes, and blue collagen fibres, cartilage matrix and mucus. In 1915, M. Heidenhain introduced azocarmine G in place of the acid fuchsine of Mallory's method. Heidenhain also introduced visually controlled destaining to provide for different colours in cell nuclei (dark red), collagen (blue) and a variety of colours in cytoplasm.
