= Hermann Welcker =

German anatomist and anthropologist (1822–1897)

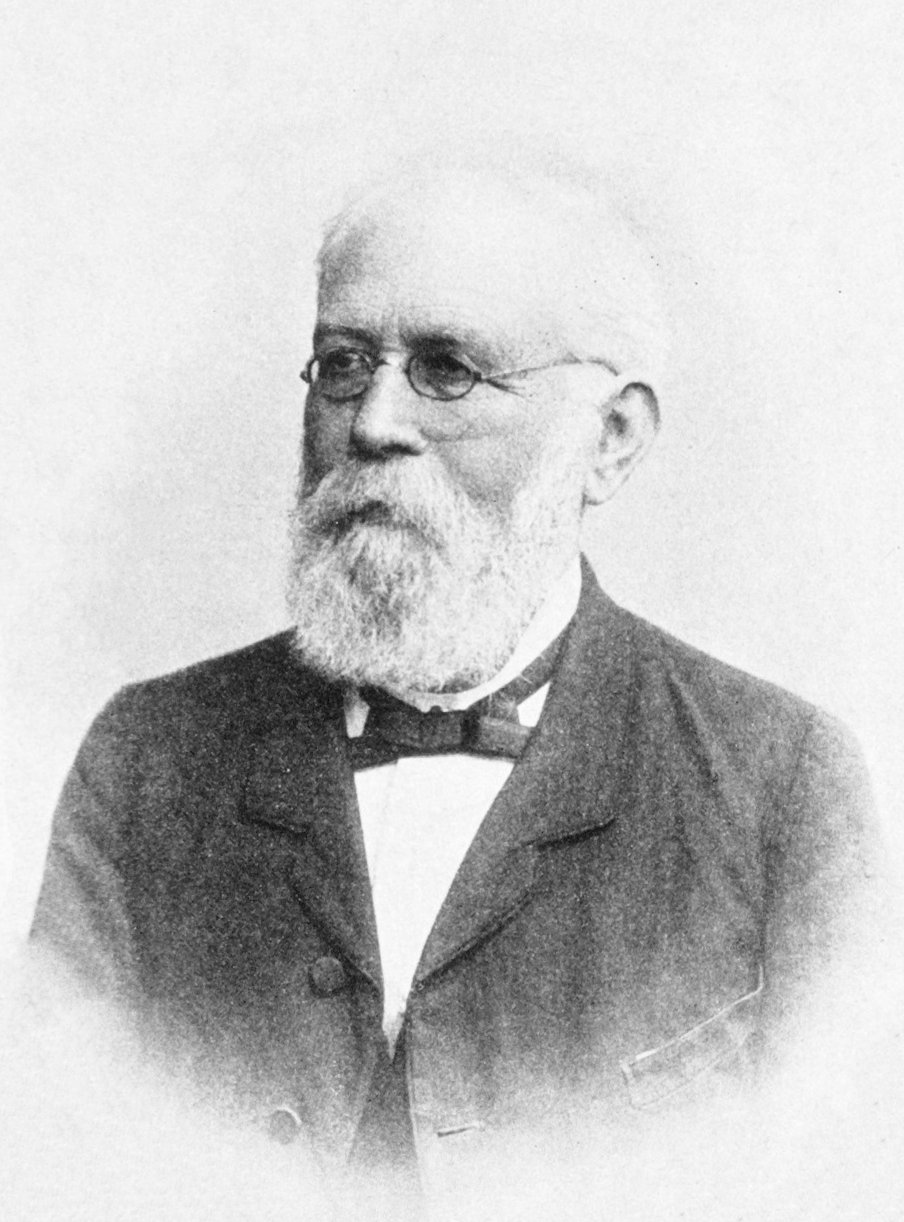
- Born: April 8, 1822; Giessen, Grand Duchy of Hesse
- Died: September 12, 1897 (aged 75); Winterstein, German Empire
- Citizenship: German Empire
- Known for: Welcker's angle, blood volume measurement, friction ridge skin study, galvanic spectacles
- Scientific career
- Fields: Anatomy, anthropology, physiology, ethnology
- Workplaces: University of Halle

Hermann Welcker (8 April 1822 – 12 September 1897) was a German anatomist and anthropologist who was born in Giessen. He was a nephew to philologist Friedrich Gottlieb Welcker (1784–1868).

In 1851 he earned his doctorate from the University of Giessen, and in 1859 he became a professor and prosector at the University of Halle. In 1876 he succeeded Alfred Wilhelm Volkmann (1801–1877) as director of the anatomical institute at Halle.

Along with his anatomical duties, Welcker was also a specialist in the fields of anthropology, ethnology, microscopy and biology. He published numerous articles on each of these subjects. In 1854 he devised a method for measuring blood volume in humans and animals. He also devised a method for measuring red blood cell volume. The eponymous "Welcker's angle" is named after him, which is the anterior, inferior angle of the parietal bone.

He is also credited with starting the first study of the persistence of friction ridge skin over time. He recorded his right hand print in 1856 and 1897, publishing a study in 1898.

In 1889 Welcker received a patent for the invention of "galvanic spectacles", which were essentially battery-operated eyeglasses with nosepiece electrodes. These glasses were used as a remedy for nasal congestion. In addition he conducted numerous studies of human skulls, including the famous skulls of Dante Alighieri and Friedrich Schiller.
