= Joseph-Alexis Stoltz =

French obstetrician (1803–1896)

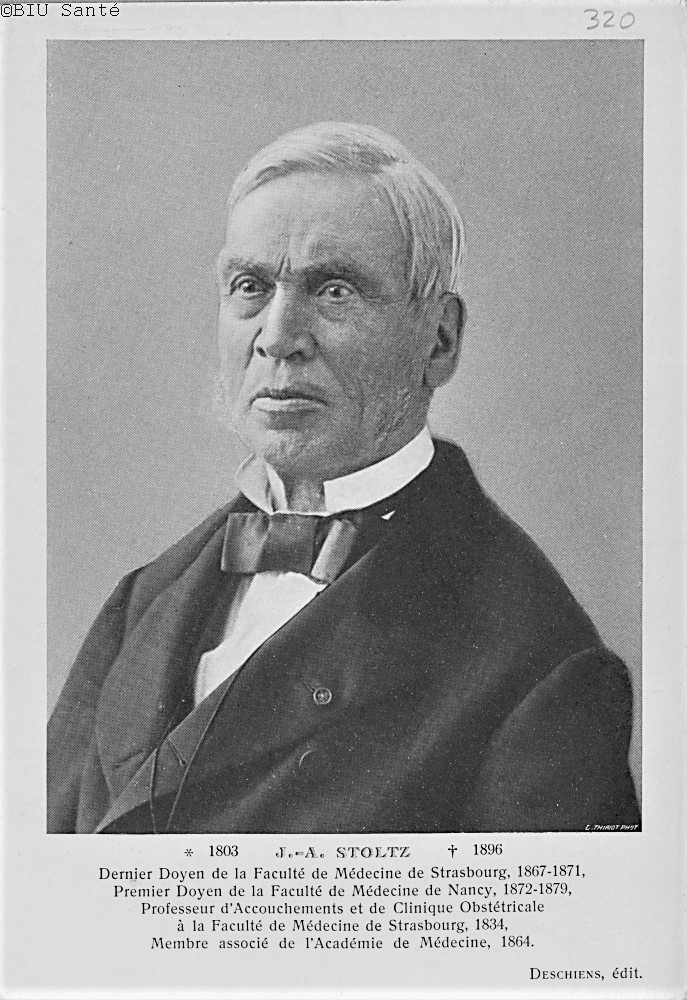
Joseph-Alexis Stoltz

Joseph-Alexis Stoltz (14 December 1803 – 20 May 1896) was a French obstetrician, born in Andlau, Grand Est, France.

In 1829 he became an associate professor at the University of Strasbourg, and in 1834 he was appointed professor of accouchements (obstetrics). In 1867 he was appointed dean of the faculty of medicine at the university. Due to the consequences of the Franco-Prussian War, the medical faculty relocated to Nancy-Université in 1872, where Stoltz resumed his role as dean. He is credited for introducing to France the technique of premature induced labor in dangerous cases, and also making improvements to the obstetrical forceps.

He was the author of many papers in the fields of obstetrics, gynecology and pediatrics, and penned the introduction to Hermann Franz Naegele's A Practical Treatise on Midwifery (French: Traité pratique de l'art des accouchements).

The following are a few of his principal writings:

- Considerations on points relating to the art of childbirth, 1826 (French: Considérations sur quelques points relatifs à l'art des accouchements)
- Of Deliverance, 1834 (French: De la délivrance)
- Memory and observations on the provocation of premature birth in cases of pelvic stricture, 1835 (French: Mémoire et observations sur la provocation de l'accouchement prématuré dans des cas de rétrécissements du bassin)
