= Martin Heidenhain =

German anatomist (1864–1949)

Martin Heidenhain (7 December 1864 – 14 December 1949) was a German anatomist born in Breslau. His father was physiologist Rudolf Heidenhain (1834–1937), and his mother, Fanny Volkmann, was the daughter of anatomist Alfred Wilhelm Volkmann (1800–1877).

Martin Heidenhain studied medicine in Freiburg im Breisgau, and in 1890 became an assistant to Albert von Kölliker (1817–1905) at the University of Würzburg. In 1899 he relocated to the University of Tübingen as an associate professor, where he remained for the rest of his career. At Würzburg and Tübingen, he also served as a prosector.

Heidenhain is remembered for his work in comparative anatomy, embryology and histology. He created a few histological stains that bear his name, including an iron haematoxylin stain that is still widely used today. The physiologist William Bayliss, credited Heidenhain's work as influential in the latter's discovery—with his brother-in-law E H Starling— of Secretin, the first hormone to be isolated. Heidenhain studied the timeline of pancreatic sectretions to the process of digestion in the stomach and intestines.

In 1894 he introduced the word "telophase" for the last stage of mitosis.

His principal written work was Plasma und Zelle (1907–1911).
