= Luise von Göchhausen =

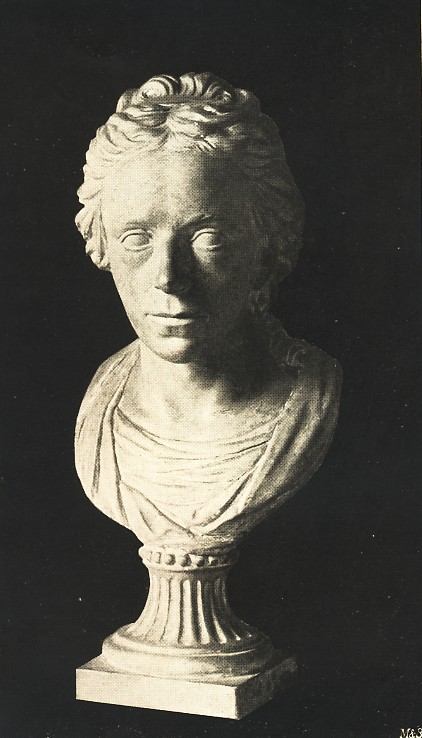
Bust of Luise von Göchhausen

Louise Ernestine Christiane Juliane von Göchhausen (13 February 1752 – 7 September 1807) was Chief Lady-in-Waiting to Duchess Anna Amalia of Saxe-Weimar-Eisenach. Known for her sharp wit, she became a close friend of Johann Wolfgang von Goethe.

== Life ==
Born in Eisenach, the daughter of a Saxe-Weimar official, Luise von Göchhausen was small and hunchbacked in stature; therefore, she considered herself lucky to be accommodated as a Lady-in-Waiting, initially to Margravine Caroline Louise of Baden, from 1783 at the Weimar court, where she and Anna Amalia lived at Tiefurt House.

Appreciated by the duchess for her intelligence and wisdom, Göchhausen also developed a good relationship with Goethe, who had been appointed to the court by Anna Amalia's son, the young Duke Karl August. She prepared numerous transcripts and excerpts of Goethe's works, among them several scenes from Faust the poet had written between 1772 and 1775. The manuscript of this earliest form of the work, known as the Urfaust, is lost, but a copy was discovered in the estate of Luise von Göchhausen and published by Erich Schmidt in 1887.

Göchhausen accompanied the duchess on her journey to Rome and Naples; she also went into exile with her, when Napoleon's troops occupied Weimar after the 1806 Battle of Jena–Auerstedt. Back at the court, Anna Amalia died in the following year, and Göchhausen only outlived her by five months. Her mortal remains were re-discovered in the Weimar Fürstengruft in 2008.
