= Brinon-sur-Beuvron =

- Commune
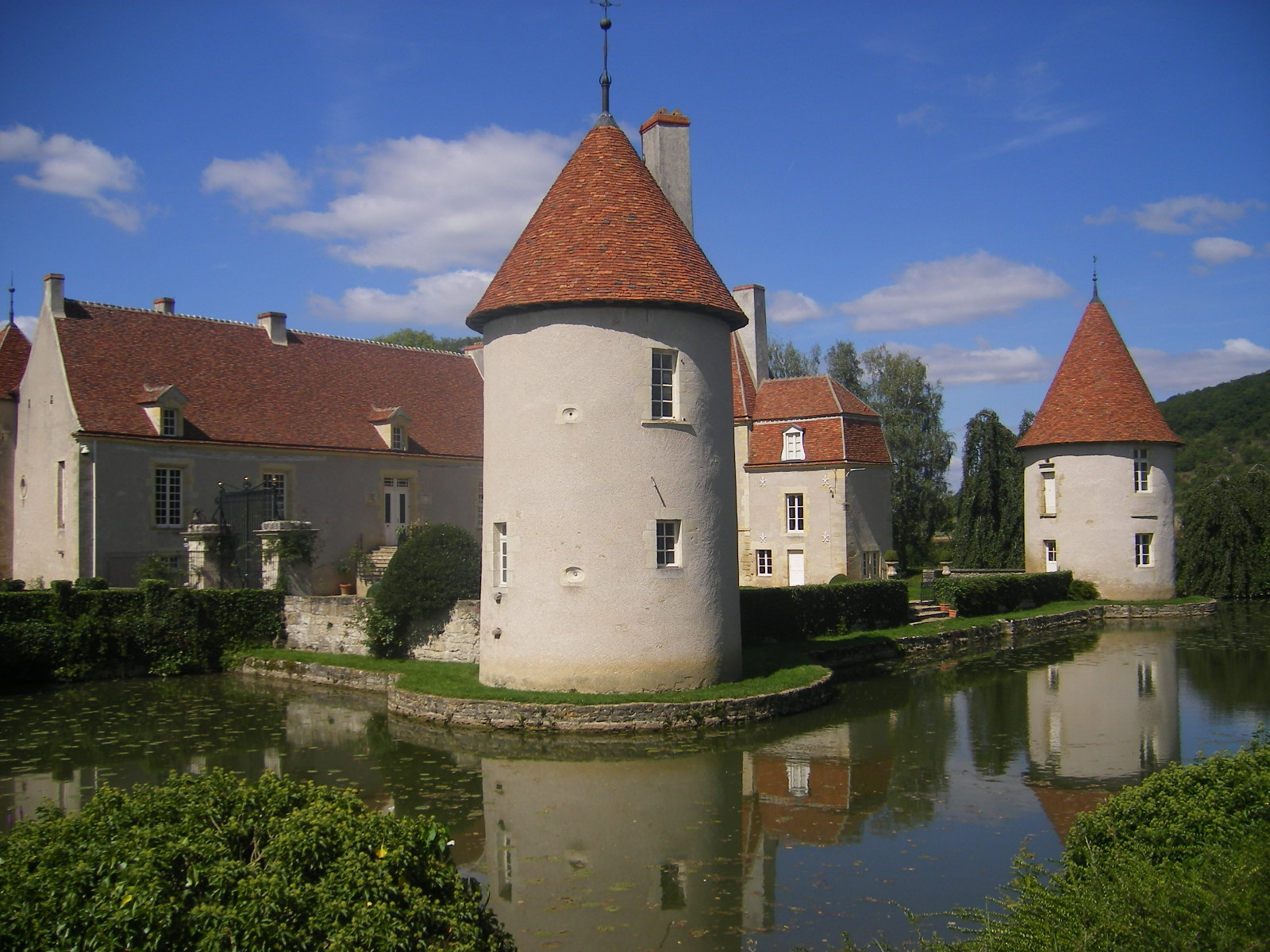
- Château de Brinon-sur-Beuvron

- Coat of arms
- Location of Brinon-sur-Beuvron
- Location within France Location within Bourgogne-Franche-Comté
- Coordinates: 47°16′54″N 3°29′31″E
- Country: France
- Region: Bourgogne-Franche-Comté
- Department: Nièvre
- Arrondissement: Clamecy
- Canton: Corbigny

Government
  - Mayor (2020–2026): Nicolas Smilevitch
- Area^{1}: 8.06 km^{2} (3.11 sq mi)
- Highest elevation: 336 m (1,102 ft)
- Lowest elevation: 197 m (646 ft)
- Population (2023): 168
  - Density: 20.8/km^{2} (54.0/sq mi)
- Time zone: UTC+01:00 (CET)
  - Summer (DST): UTC+02:00 (CEST)
- INSEE/Postal code: 58041 /58420
- ^{1} French Land Register data, which excludes lakes, ponds, glaciers > 1 km^{2} (0.386 sq mi or 247 acres) and river estuaries.

Brinon-sur-Beuvron (French pronunciation: [bʁinɔ̃ syʁ bøvʁɔ̃]) is a commune in the Nièvre department in central France.

== Population ==
Historical population
Year	Pop.	±% p.a.
1968	284	—
1975	273	−0.56%
1982	253	−1.08%
1990	259	+0.29%
1999	211	−2.25%
2007	218	+0.41%
2012	198	−1.91%
2017	181	−1.78%
2023	168	−1.23%
Source: INSEE

== See also ==
- Communes of the Nièvre department
