= Raphaël Bienvenu Sabatier =

French anatomist and surgeon

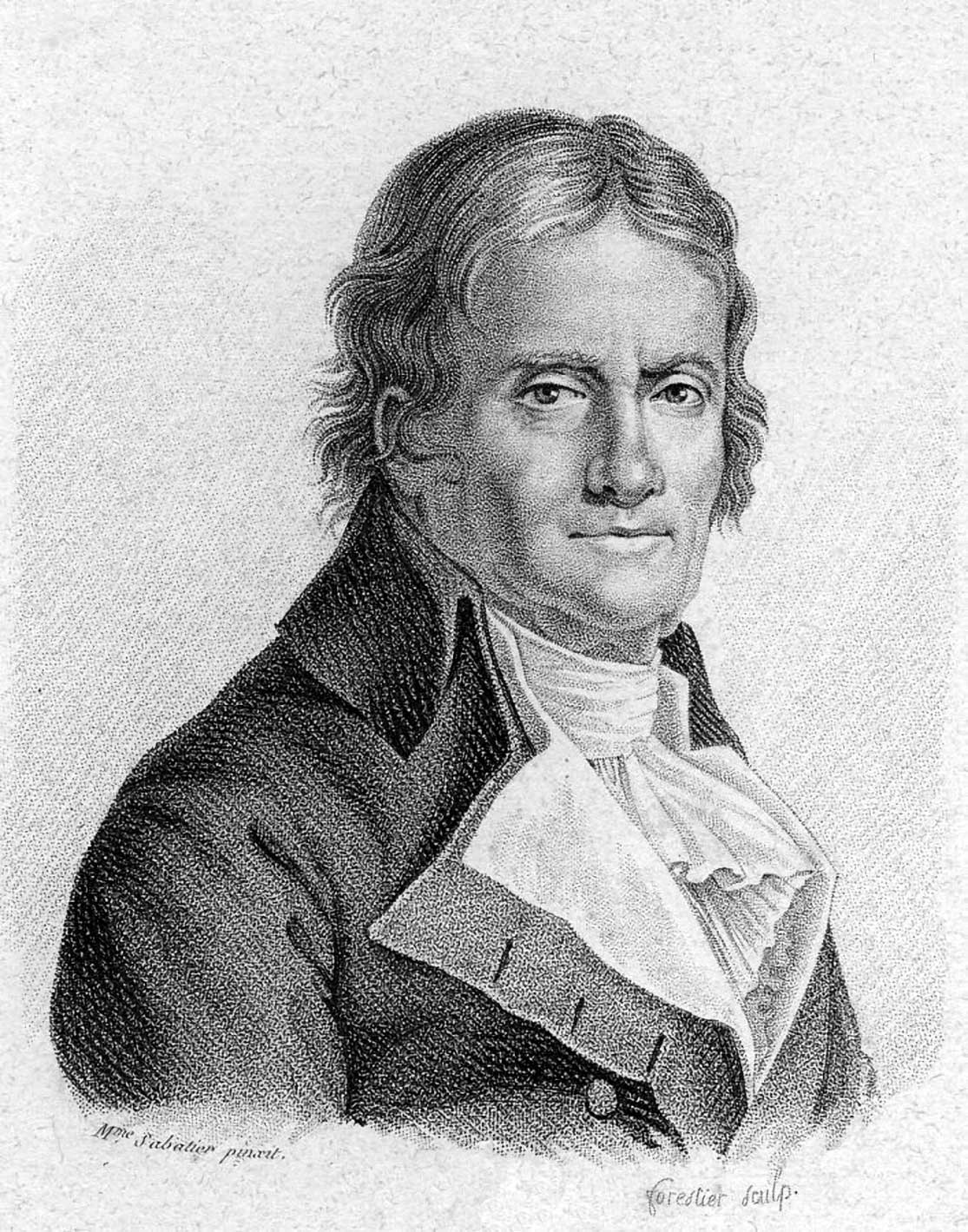
Raphael Bienvenu Sabatier (1732-1811)

Raphaël Bienvenu Sabatier (11 October 1732 – 19 July 1811) was a French anatomist and surgeon born in Paris.

He studied medicine in Paris, and in 1756 became a professor at the Collège Royal de Chirurgie. Shortly afterwards, he became chief surgeon at the Hôtel des Invalides, and in 1795 was a professor at the École de Santé. Sabatier was a member of the French Academy of Sciences, and was a consultant-surgeon to Napoleon Bonaparte.

Sabatier was the author of De la médecine opératoire, a popular surgical treatise in its day, and Traité complet d'anatomie, a three-volume work on anatomy. He was an early practitioner of medical percussion, a procedure he used in the diagnosis of empyema.

== Written works ==
- Mémoire sur les nerfs de la dixième paire, (1776).
- Mémoire sur quelques particularitiés de la structure du cerveau et de ses enveloppes, (1776).
- De la médecine opératoire, ou des opérations de Chirurgie qui se pratiquent le plus fréquemment, Paris, Didot le Jeune, 1796.
- Traité complet d'anatomie, ou, Description de toutes les parties du corps humain, Théophile Barrois le Jeune, 1798.
