= Sue (name) =

Female given name

Sue is a given name and a common short form of a number of female given names: Susan, Susanna / Susannah / Suzanna, Susanne, Suzanne, Suzette.

It is rarely used as a man's name, a notable example being Sue K. Hicks (1895–1980), American jurist, who may have inspired the song "A Boy Named Sue".

== A ==
- Sue Akers (born 1957), British police officer
- Sue Alexander (1933–2008), American writer
- Sue Alexander, Australian tennis player
- Sue Allen (born 1947), American politician
- Sue Anschutz-Rodgers (born 1936), American rancher, conservationist, and philanthropist
- Sue Armstrong (born 1973), Canadian field hockey player
- Sue Arnold, British journalist
- Sue Arrowsmith (1950–2014), British artist

== B ==
- Sue Bagshaw (born 1949), New Zealand doctor
- Sue Bailey (born 1961), British rowing cox
- Sue Bailey (born 1972), British para table tennis player
- Sue Bailey Thurman (1903–1996), American author, lecturer, historian and civil rights activist
- Sue Baker (died 2022), British journalist and television presenter
- Sue Bale, British nurse
- Sue Ball (born 1967), American actress
- Sue Banks (born 1972), Australian sports shooter
- Sue Barker (born 1956), British television presenter and professional tennis player
- Sue Barnes (born 1952), Canadian politician
- Sue Barrell, Meteorologist and scientist
- Sue Anne Bartlett (born 1942), Canadian curler
- Sue Beardsmore (born 1955), English presenter
- Sue Bender (1933–2025), American author
- Sue Bennett, American singer
- Sue Bierman (1924–2006), American politician
- Sue Biggins (born 1968), American cell biologist
- Sue Biggs, English Director General of the Royal Horticultural Society
- Sue Bird (born 1980), American professional basketball player
- Sue Bird, British acoustic engineer
- Sue Birtwistle (born 1945), British television producer
- Sue Black, Baroness Black of Strome (born 1961), Scottish forensic anthropologist
- Sue Black (born 1962), English computer scientist
- Sue Blane (born 1949), English costume designer
- Sue Booth-Forbes, teacher, writer, and editor
- Sue Boldra (born 1949), American politician
- Sue Bond (born 1945), British actress
- Sue Bourne, Scottish television documentary producer and director
- Sue Boyce (born 1951), Australian politician
- Sue Bradford (born 1952), New Zealand activist, academic, and politician
- Sue Worthington Bradley (1883–1970), American First Lady of Guam
- Sue Brannan Walker (born 1940), American poet
- Sue Bremner (born 1954), American diplomat
- Sue Brimble (born c. 1950), Welsh international badminton player
- Sue Brooks, Australian film director
- Sue Brown (born 1958), English coxswain
- Sue Brown (born 1958), New Zealand cricketer
- Sue K. Brown (1948–2024), American diplomat
- Sue M. Wilson Brown (1877–1941), American suffrage activist
- Sue Bruce (born 1964), New Zealand distance runner
- Sue Bruce-Smith (died 2020), British film producer
- Sue Brunning, British archaeologist
- Sue Buckett, English footballer
- Sue Bulger, Australian politician
- Sue Burke (born 1955), American writer and translator
- Sue Burns (1950–2009), American businesswoman
- Sue Butterworth (1950–2004), British bookseller

== C ==
- Sue Cahill (born 1959), American politician
- Sue Cameron, British journalist and columnist
- Sue Campbell, Baroness Campbell of Loughborough (born 1948), British administrator and noble
- Sue Carol (1906–1982), American actress and talent agent
- Sue Carpenter (born 1956), British television presenter
- Sue Carr, Baroness Carr of Walton-on-the-Hill (born 1964), British jurist and life peer
- Sue Carroll (1953–2011), British writer and columnist
- Sue Carter (born 1956), Australian politician
- Sue Ann Carwell, American singer-songwriter
- Sue Casey (1926–2019), American actress
- Sue Cashman, Irish camogie player
- Sue Castorino, American journalist
- Sue Chandler, British mathematics teacher and writer
- Sue Charles, British weather presenter
- Sue Chetwin, New Zealand journalist and consumer rights advocate
- Sue Cheung, English novelist
- Sue Chew (1958–2024), American politician
- Sue Wah Chin (1900–2000), Chinese-Australian businesswoman
- Sue Ainslie Clark (1879–1965), American labor activist
- Sue Brannon Clark, environmental radiochemist
- Sue Cassidy Clark, American music journalist and photographer
- Sue Clayton, British film director
- Sue Cleaver (born 1963), English actress
- Sue Clifford (born 1944), co-founded Common Ground
- Sue Cline (died 2021), American politician
- Sue Clowes (born 1957), English textile and fashion designer
- Sue Bell Cobb (born 1956), American judge
- Sue M. Cobb (born 1937), American politician
- Sue Coe (born 1951), British artist
- Sue Coleman (born 1947), English Wildlife painter
- Sue Conley (born 1960), American politician
- Sue Conley, American businesswoman
- Sue Cook (born 1949), British presenter and author
- Sue Cook (born 1958), Australian racewalking athlete
- Sue Weinlein Cook, American game designer and editor
- Sue Copsey (born 1960), English writer
- Sue Costello (born 1968), American actress
- Sue Costin (bon 1944), Australian swimmer and actress
- Sue Courtenay (born c.1966), Belizean architect
- Sue Jean Covacevich (1905–1998), American artist
- Sue Crawford (born 1967), American politician
- Sue Crengle, New Zealand Māori academic
- Sue Crockford (1943–2019), UK film maker and activist
- Sue Crolcik (born 1942), American art director and graphic designer
- Sue Curry, American health management and policy scholar

== D ==
- Sue Darlow (1960–2011), photographer
- Sue S. Dauser (1888–1972), United States Navy Nurse Corps Superintendent
- Sue Davies (1933–2020), British gallery director
- Sue Day (born 1972), England international rugby union player
- Sue de Beer (born 1973), American artist
- Sue Denison (born in 1943), Australian nurse practitioner
- Sue Desmond-Hellmann (born 1958), American oncologist and biotechnology leader
- Sue Devaney (born 1967), English actress
- Sue DiCicco (born 1959), American sculptor, children's book author and illustrator
- Sue Dickenson, American politician
- Sue Dodge, American singer
- Sue Donaldson (born 1962), Canadian writer and philosopher
- Sue Donaldson, American politician
- Sue Donohoe (1959–2020), American basketball coach
- Sue Dorrington (born 1958), English rugby union player
- Sue Dougan (born 1974), Northern Irish afternoon presenter
- Sue Doughty (born 1948), British politician
- Sue Douglas (born 1957), British journalist and media executive
- Sue Downey (born 1945), American former model and beauty queen
- Sue Draheim (1949–2013), American fiddler
- Sue Duggan (born 1963), New Zealand field hockey player
- Sue Dwiggins (1914–2011), American writer and production assistant
- Sue Dye, American politician

== E ==
- Sue Eakin (1918–2009), American historian
- Sue Eddy (born 1953), Australian swimmer
- Sue Ellery (born 1962), Australian politician
- Sue Ellspermann (born 1960), American academic administrator and politician
- Sue Elizabeth Evison, New Zealand geotechnical engineer
- Sue England (1928–2018), American actress
- Sue Ennis, American songwriter
- Sue Enquist (born 1957), American softball player and coach
- Sue Errington (born 1942), American politician
- Sue Essex (born 1945), British politician
- Sue Evans (born 1951), American jazz musician
- Sue Everhart, American banker and politician

== F ==
- Sue Fairhurst (born 1974), Australian softball player
- Sue Falsone, American athletic trainer
- Sue Fear (1963–2006), Australian mountain climber
- Sue Fennessy (born 1968), Australian-born American entrepreneur
- Sue Ferns (born 1960), British trade unionist
- Sue Field (born 1959), English Anglican priest
- Sue Fink, American singer, songwriter, conductor, and voice teacher
- Sue Fish (born 1958), American motorcycle racer
- Sue Fleischl, New Zealand chef
- Sue Fletcher-Watson, British developmental psychologist
- Sue Fliess, American writer
- Sue Foley (born 1968), Canadian guitarist and singer
- Sue Forbes (born 1961), American cross-country skier
- Sue Ford (1943–2009), Australian photographer
- Sue Foster, English snooker player
- Sue French-Lee (born 1960), Canadian long-distance runner
- Sue Fryer Ward (1935–2014), American elder rights activist
- Sue Fuller (1914–2006), American sculptor
- Sue Funch (born 1955), Australian swimmer

== G ==
- Sue Gafner (born 1964), American bodybuilder
- Sue Galkantas, American basketball player
- Sue Galloway, American comedian
- Sue Garden-Bachop (1961–2008), New Zealand sportsperson
- Sue Gardiner, New Zealand horticultural scientist
- Sue Gardner (born 1967), Canadian journalist
- Sue Gee (born 1947), British writer
- Sue Geh (1959–1998), Australian basketball player
- Sue Geller, American mathematician
- Sue Gerhardt (born 1953), British psychoanalytic psychotherapist
- Sue Gibson (born 1955), alpine skier from New Zealand
- Sue Gibson (1952–2016), British cinematographer
- Sue Gibson (born 1960), British research chemist
- Sue May Gill (1887–1989), American painter
- Sue Anne Gilroy (born 1948), American politician
- Sue Glick (born 1950 or 1951), American lawyer and politician
- Sue Glover (born 1949), singer with British vocal duo Sue and Sunny
- Sue Glover (born 1943), Scottish playwright
- Sue Goffe, English film maker
- Sue Golder (born 1946), New Zealand racing cyclist
- Sue Goldie (born 1961), American physician and scientist
- Sue Golding (born 1964), American philosopher
- Sue Gollifer (born 1944), British printmaker and digital artist
- Sue Gordon (born 1943), Aboriginal magistrate
- Sue Gossick (born 1947), American diver
- Sue Gotting, American politician
- Sue Grace (born 1958), American politician
- Sue Grafton (1940–2017), American author
- Sue Gray (born 1957), British special adviser and civil servant
- Sue Gray (born 1963), Royal Air Force Air Marshal
- Sue Grayzel, American academic historian
- Sue Gregory (born 1971), New Zealand footballer
- Sue Green (born 1953), American professional wrestler
- Sue Green (born 1950), British fencer
- Sue Greenleaf, American novelist
- Sue Grey, political figure and environmental lawyer
- Sue T. Griffin (born 1934), American neuroscientist
- Sue Grimmond, New Zealand scientist and researcher
- Sue Groom (born 1963), English Anglican priest
- Sue Gross (born 1950), American billionaire philanthropist
- Sue Guevara (born 1954), American basketball coach
- Sue Gunter (1939–2005), American basketball coach

== H ==
- Sue Hadjopoulos, American percussionist
- Sue Sally Hale (1937–2003), American polo player
- Sue Hamilton, British archaeologist and professor
- Sue Hamilton (1945–1969), American model and actress
- Sue Hammell (born 1945), Canadian politician
- Sue Handscomb (born 1956), British rower
- Sue Harcus (born 1954), Australian basketball player and coach
- Sue Hardesty (1933–2022), American writer
- Sue Harris, English musician
- Sue Harrison (born 1950), American author
- Sue Harrison (born 1971), British long-distance athlete
- Sue Hartley, British ecologist
- Sue Harukata (1521–1555), Japanese samurai
- Sue Harvard (1888–1967), Welsh operatic soprano
- Sue Hastings (1884–1977), American puppeteer
- Sue Hatcher, Australian animal genetics researcher
- Sue Hawk (born 1961), American reality TV personality
- Sue Hay-Carr (born 1964), British sailor
- Sue Hayes (1951–2021), British film and television executive
- Sue Hayman (born 1962), British politician
- Sue Haywood (born 1971), American mountain biker
- Sue Heap (born 1954), British children's book illustrator
- Sue Hearn (born 1956), Australian equestrian
- Sue Hearnshaw (born 1961), British long jumper
- Sue Hecht (1947–2025), American politician
- Sue Helm (born 1943), American politician
- Sue Hendra (born 1973), British writer and illustrator
- Sue Hendrickson (born 1949), American explorer and fossil collector
- Sue Henry (1940–2020), American novelist
- Sue Heon (born 1962), American swimmer
- Sue Herera (born 1957), American journalist and television anchor
- Sue Hettmansperger (born 1948), American visual artist
- Sue Hickey (born 1958), Australian politician
- Sue K. Hicks (1895–1980), American judge
- Sue Higginson, Australian politician
- Sue Hill (born 1955), British healthcare scientist
- Sue Hilliam (born 1941), English cricketer
- Sue Hines (born 1959), Australian author, radio personality, and artist
- Sue Hobbs (born 1956/1957), Australian para-athlete
- Sue Hodge (born 1957), British actress
- Sue E. Holbert (born 1935), American archivist
- Sue Holderness (born 1949), English actress
- Sue Hole, Australian tennis player
- Sue Holloway (born 1955), Canadian cross-country skier and sprint canoeist
- Sue Metzger Dickey Hough (1883–1980), American lawyer, businesswoman and politician
- Sue Howland (born 1960), Australian javelin thrower
- Sue Huang, New Zealand-based virologist
- Sue Hubbard, English writer
- Sue Hubbell (1935–2018), American writer
- Sue Huff, Canadian politician

== I ==
- Sue Ieraci (born 1960), Australian doctor and medical advocate
- Sue Innes (1948–2005), British writer, artist, and campaigner
- Sue Ion (born 1955), British engineer

== J ==
- Sue Jacobs (1950–2012), New Zealand association football player
- Sue James, American accountant and board member
- Sue Jeffers (born 1956), American politician and businesswoman
- Sue Jenkins (born 1958), English actress
- Sue Jenner (born 1960), British swimmer
- Sue Jinks-Robertson, American professor of genetics and microbiology
- Sue Johanson (1930–2023), Canadian registered nurse and sex educator
- Sue John (born 1953), British headteacher and educator
- Sue Johnston (born 1943), English actress
- Sue Jones (born 1947), Welsh-Australian actress
- Sue Jones (born 1960), Welsh Anglican priest
- Sue Jones (active since 1990), British computational biologist
- Sue Jones-Davies (born 1949), Welsh singer and actor

== K ==
- Sue Kameli (born 1956), Canadian hurdler
- Sue Karahalios (born 1949), American politician
- Sue Kaufman (1926–1977), American novelist
- Sue Kedgley (born 1948), New Zealand politician
- Sue Kellaway (born c. 1940), Australian television personality
- Sue Keller (born 1952), American pianist and singer
- Sue Kelly (born 1936), American politician
- Sue Kent, English gardening expert and TV presenter
- Sue Kerr (born 1971), American writer and activist
- Sue Khim, American education entrepreneur
- Sue Monk Kidd (born 1948), American novelist and memoirist
- Sue Klebold (born 1949), American mother of Dylan Klebold
- Sue Kneebone (born 1963), Australian artist
- Sue Knight, Australian philosopher, educator and academic
- Sue Ko Lee (1910–1996), Chinese-American labor activist
- Sue Kreitzman, American-British artist, curator, cookbook author, and television chef
- Sue Kullen (born 1960), American politician
- Sue Kunitomi Embrey (1923–2006), American teacher and activist
- Sue Kwon, American journalist

== L ==
- Sue Landske (1937–2015), American politician
- Sue Ane Langdon (born 1936), American actress
- Sue Law (born 1966), English footballer
- Sue Lawrence, Scottish cookery and food writer
- Sue Lawley (born 1946), English television and radio broadcaster
- Sue Lees (1941–2002), English academic, activist, feminist and writer
- Sue LeMaich, Canadian snooker player
- Sue Lenier (born 1957), English writer
- Sue Lent (born 1952), British politician and activist
- Sue LePage (born 1951), Canadian set designer and costume designer
- Sue Leurgans, Biostatistician
- Sue Lewis (born 1954), Australian swimmer
- Sue Limb (born 1946), British writer and broadcaster
- Sue Lines (born 1953), Australian politician
- Sue Lloyd-Roberts (1950–2015), British journalist
- Sue Lloyd (1939–2011), English model and actress
- Sue Longhurst (born 1943), English actress
- Sue Lopez (born 1954), English footballer
- Sue Lovell (born 1950), American politician
- Sue Lowden (born 1952), American politician
- Sue Lee Loy, Hawaiian politician
- Sue Lyon (1946–2019), American actress

== M ==
- Sue Maberry, American artist, administrator, librarian
- Sue Macartney-Snape (born 1957), British illustrator
- Sue Mackay (born 1960), Australian politician
- Sue MacGregor (born 1941), British broadcaster
- Sue Macy (born 1954), American writer
- Sue Malek (born 1951), American politician
- Sue Manteris (born 1962), American journalist
- Sue Mappin (born 1947), British tennis player
- Sue Mapstone (born 1956), British pentathlete
- Sue Margolis (1955–2017), English novelist
- Sue Maroroa (1991–2023), New Zealand-English chess player
- Sue Marx (1930–2023), American documentary filmmaker
- Sue Maslin (born 1958 or 1959), Australian film producer
- Sue Mason, British artist
- Sue Masters, Australian television producer
- Sue Mayfield (born 1963), British author
- Sue McAllister, British politician
- Sue McCauley (born 1941), New Zealand writer
- Sue McCready (born 1981), Australian sports shooter
- Sue McIntosh, Australian actress
- Sue McKemmish, Australian archivist
- Sue McKenzie (born 1950), Australian swimmer
- Sue McLeish (born 1954), New Zealand field hockey player
- Sue Medley (born 1962), Canadian rock musician
- Sue Meek, Australian scientist
- Sue Mengers (1932–2011), American talent agent
- Sue Meredith (born 1946), American politician
- Sue Merz (born 1972), American ice hockey player
- Sue Middleton (born 1947), New Zealand life history academic
- Sue Miles (1944–2010), Anglo-American activist
- Sue Miller (born 1943), American novelist
- Sue Miller (1934–2017), American model and author
- Sue Milliken, Australian film producer and author
- Sue Harper Mims (1842–1913), American social leader
- Sue Minford (born 1954), Irish tennis player
- Sue Mingus (1930–2022), American record producer and band manager
- Sue Minter (born 1961), American politician
- Sue Monroe, British television presenter, actress, and author
- Sue Monteath (born 1959), Australian soccer player
- Sue Bea Montgomery (born 1958), American film producer
- Sue Moore, American marine scientist
- Sue Morano (born 1960), American politician
- Sue Moroney (born 1964), New Zealand politician
- Sue Morris (born 1958), New Zealand cricketer
- Sue Mosteller (born 1933), Canadian writer and teacher
- Sue Mountstevens (born 1955), British politician
- Sue Moxley, Canadian Anglican bishop
- Sue Mullen, American politician
- Sue Mullins (born 1936), American politician
- Sue Murphy, Australian civil engineer and business executive
- Sue Murphy, American stand-up comedian
- Sue E. Myerscough (born 1951), American judge
- Sue Myrick (born 1941), American politician

== N ==
- Sue Nabi (born 1968), Algerian entrepreneur
- Sue Naegle, American business executive
- Sue Napier (1948–2010), Australian politician
- Sue Nelson (born 1961), British science writer and broadcaster
- Sue Baross Nesbitt (born 1954), American synchronized swimmer and coach
- Sue Newman, American politician
- Sue Newman, Australian squash player
- Sue Nicholls (born 1943), English actress
- Sue C. Nichols (1965–2020), American artist
- Sue Niederer, American political activist
- Sue Nott (1969– c. 2006), American mountain climber and ice climber
- Sue Novara-Reber (born 1955), American track cyclist
- Sue Nyathi (born 1978), Zimbabwean author

== O ==
- Sue O'Connell, American publisher and media commentator
- Sue O'Connor, Australian archaeologist
- Sue Olsen, Canadian politician
- Sue Orr (born 1962), New Zealand author
- Sue Owen (born 1955), British former civil servant, economist and academic
- Sue Owen (born 1942), American poet

== P ==
- Sue Packer (born 1942), Australian paediatrician and advocate
- Sue Page (born 1960), Australian medical doctor
- Sue Palmer, Author and Childhood Campaigner
- Sue Palmer-Komar (born 1967), Canadian cyclist
- Sue Parfitt (b. 1941 or 1942), Climate activist
- Sue Parham, American businesswoman and consultant
- Sue Parrill (born 1935), American literary scholar
- Sue Paterno (born 1940), American philanthropist
- Sue Paterson (1953–2018), New Zealand theatre and festival director
- Sue C. Payton (born 1950), American government official
- Sue Peabody, American historian
- Sue Pearce (born 1969), Australian cricketer
- Sue Pedersen (born 1977), Canadian physician
- Sue Pedley (born 1954), Tasmanian artist
- Sue Pembrey (1942–2013), British nurse
- Sue Pennicuik (born 1957), Australian politician
- Sue Perkins (born 1969), British actress and comedian
- Sue Perlgut, American poet
- Sue Pettett (born 1956), English sprinter
- Sue Picus (1948–2021), American bridge player
- Sue Ann Pien (born 1979 or 1980), American actress
- Sue Pinnington (1966–2021), British Anglican priest
- Sue Piper (born 1951), New Zealand retired trade unionist
- Sue Platt (born 1940), British track and field athlete
- Sue Povey (1942–2019), British geneticist
- Sue Powell-Reed, Welsh Radio and Television Broadcaster
- Sue Prado (born 1981), Filipina actress
- Sue Prestedge, Canadian sports broadcaster
- Sue Price (born 1965), American bodybuilder and actress
- Sue Prideaux, Anglo-Norwegian writer
- Sue Pritzker (1932–1982), American socialite, philanthropist, and activist
- Sue Pullon, New Zealand public health researcher

== R ==
- Sue Rahr, American law enforcement officer
- Sue Ramirez (born 1996), Filipino actress and singer
- Sue Ramsbottom (born 1973), Irish Gaelic and rugby union footballer
- Sue Ramsey (born 1970), Irish Republican politician
- Sue Randall (1935–1984), American actress
- Sue Raney (born 1940), American jazz singer
- Sue Rankin (born 1956), American academic
- Sue Rattray (born 1953), New Zealand cricketer
- Sue Redfern (born 1977), English cricketer and umpire
- Sue Reeve (born 1951), British long jumper and hurdler
- Sue Reid (born 1970), Canadian field hockey player
- Sue Reidy, New Zealand author and designer
- Sue Rembao (born 1962), American high jumper
- Sue Reno, American fiber artist
- Sue Rezin (born 1962), American politician
- Sue Richards (1958–2014), Canadian artist and social entrepreneur
- Sue Richardson (born 1946), Australian economist and labour market researcher
- Sue Richardson, English jazz singer, trumpet player, composer and educator
- Sue Riddlestone, British sustainability executive and social entrepreneur
- Sue Rieke Smith, American politician and teacher
- Sue Rigby, British palaeontologist
- Sue Roberts (born 1970), English-Antipodean librarian
- Sue Roberts (born 1948), American professional golfer
- Sue Roberts, Australian powerlifter
- Sue Lewis Robinson (born 1952), American judge
- Sue Rocca (born 1949), American politician
- Sue Roces (born 1985), Filipino volleyball player
- Sue Rodriguez (1950–1994), Canadian activist
- Sue Roffey, British-Australian psychologist and academic
- Sue Rohan (born 1952), American politician
- Sue Rolph (born 1978), British swimmer
- Sue Rose, American cartoonist, screenwriter, and voice actress
- Sue Rosenberg Zalk (1945 – 2001), American psychologist
- Sue V. Rosser (born 1947), American scholar and academic administrator
- Sue Ryder (1924–2000), British humanitarian

== S ==
- Sue Saliba (born 1957), Australian tennis player
- Sue Samuels, American jazz dancer, choreographer, and teacher
- Sue A. Sanders (1842–1931), American teacher, clubwoman, and author
- Sue Sarafian Jehl (1917–1997), American Women's Auxiliary Army Corps (WAAC) personnel
- Sue Savage-Rumbaugh (born 1946), American psychologist and primatologist
- Sue Schafer, American politician
- Sue Schechter (born 1952), American politician
- Sue Scherer, American politician
- Sue Schmitz, American politician
- Sue Schoemehl, American politician
- Sue Schurman, American scholar
- Sue Scott (born 1957), American actress and character voice actor
- Sue Scott, British sociologist
- Sue Willie Seltzer (1922–2010), American artist
- Sue Semrau (born 1962), American collegiate basketball coach
- Sue Sentance, British computer scientist and educator
- Sue Serino (born 1961), American politician
- Sue Shaffer (1922–2017), American activist
- Sue Shear (1918–1998), American politician
- Sue Shink, American politician
- Sue Simmons (born 1942), American news anchor
- Sue Sinclair, Canadian poet
- Sue Sinclair (1932–2020), American sailor
- Sue Singer, British mathematics educator
- Sue Sisley, American internist and psychiatrist
- Sue Slipman (born 1949), English unionist
- Sue Smith, several people
- Sue Son (born 1985), South Korean violinist
- Sue Spaid (born 1961), American museum curator
- Sue Spencer, Australian journalist and television producer
- Sue Stap (born 1954), American tennis player
- Sue Stewart (born 1969), Canadian basketball player
- Sue Stockdale (born 1966), British polar adventurer, athlete and motivational speaker
- Sue Stott, New Zealand orthopaedic surgeon
- Sue Street (born 1949), British civil servant
- Sue Suckling (born 1957 or 1958), New Zealand businesswoman and commercial director
- Sue Sumii (1902–1997), Japanese social reformer, writer, and novelist
- Sue Sweeney, English comedian and radio presenter
- Sue Syme (born 1962), New Zealand artist

== T ==
- Sue Terry (born 1959), American jazz saxophonist and composer
- Sue Mi Terry (born c. 1972), Korean-American international relations scholar
- Sue Thearle, British journalist
- Sue Thomas (1950–2022), American author and former FBI agent
- Sue Thompson (1925–2021), American singer
- Sue Thrasher, American Civil rights activist
- Sue Tibbs (1934–2012), American politician
- Sue Tilley (born 1957), English artist's model and writer
- Sue Timney (born 1950), British interior, product and textile designer
- Sue Tingley (born 1977), Canadian field hockey player
- Sue Tinson (born 1943), British business executive and former television executive
- Sue Tompkins (born 1971), British visual and sound artist
- Sue Torres (born c. 1973), American chef and television personality
- Sue Townsend (1946–2014), English writer and humorist
- Sue Tranka, South African nurse and healthcare administrator
- Sue Troyan, American basketball coach
- Sue Turton (born c.1966), British journalist
- Sue Tutt (born 1943), British tennis player

== U ==
- Sue Ulu, American actress
- Sue Upton (born 1954), English actress and dancer

== V ==
- Sue van der Merwe (born 1954), South African politician
- Sue van Geijn (born 1988), Dutch artist
- Sue VandeWoude, American veterinarian and researcher
- Sue Landon Vaughan (1835–1911), American artist and writer
- Sue Vertue (born 1960), English television producer
- Sue Vicory, American film producer
- Sue Vincent, British actress and writer
- Sue Vinton (born 1956), American politician

== W ==
- Sue Waddington (born 1944), British politician
- Sue Wagner (1940–2026), American politician
- Sue Walker (born 1951), British-Australian politician
- Sue Walker (born 1967), British rower
- Sue Brannan Walker (born 1940), American poet
- Sue Wallace, British character actress
- Sue Wallis (1957–2014), American politician
- Sue Wanjiru, Kenyan actress
- Sue Allen Warren (1917–1997), American clinical psychologist and educator
- Sue Webber, Scottish Conservative politician
- Sue Weber (born 1986), American soccer player
- Sue Weinlein Cook, American game designer
- Sue Welfare (born 1963), English writer
- Sue Weller, British Anglican priest
- Sue Wells (born 1965), New Zealand media personality and politician
- Sue West (born 1947), Australian politician
- Sue Shelton White (1887–1943), American lawyer
- Sue Whitebrook (born 1960), Australian sprint canoeist
- Sue Whitesides, Canadian mathematician and computer scientist
- Sue Whyatt, English footballer
- Sue Wickner, American biochemist and geneticist
- Sue Wicks (born 1966), American professional basketball player
- Sue Wilding (born 1948), Australian politician
- Sue Wilkinson (1943–2005), British singer-songwriter
- Sue Williams (born 1954), American artist
- Sue Williams (born 1956), British artist
- Sue Williamson (born 1941), South African artist
- Sue Wilson, American politician
- Sue Wilson Beffort (born 1946), American politician
- Sue Wills (1944–2022), Australian academic and activist
- Sue Wise (born 1953), English author and academic
- Sue Wood (born 1948), New Zealand politician
- Sue Woodford-Hollick (born 1945), British businesswoman and consultant
- Sue Ellen Wooldridge (born 1961), American lawyer
- Sue Woolfe (born 1950), Australian author
- Sue Wootton (born 1961), New Zealand poet
- Sue Wong, Chinese-American fashion designer
- Sue Wright (born 1970), English squash player

== Y ==
- Sue Yenger (1938–2022), American politician

== Fictional characters ==
- Sue Barton, a character in a series of seven novels written by Helen Dore Boylston
- Sue Bond, a character from British medical soap opera, Doctors
- Sue Brockman, a character from the British sitcom, Outnumbered
- Sue Clayton, character in 1985 in UK tv soap opera Coronation Street
- Sue Dibny, a character from DC Comics associated with the Elongated Man
- Sue Ellen Ewing, a main character from the soap opera, Dallas
- Sue Hastings, a character in British soap opera, Emmerdale
- Sue Heck, a main character from the television series, The Middle
- Sue Osman, Fictional character from the BBC soap opera EastEnders
- Sue Ann Nivens, a character on situation comedy, The Mary Tyler Moore Show
- Sue Miller, a character in the BBC soap opera, EastEnders
- Sue Mundy, a fictional guerrilla character created by George D. Prentice
- Sue Morgan, a fictional character from the soap opera, Hollyoaks
- Sue Snell, a character created by author Stephen King in his novel, Carrie
- Sue Sylvester, a character from the television series, Glee
- Sue Wright, a character from Australian television soap opera, Neighbours
- Sue (Pac-Man), a purple (sometimes orange) ghost in the Pac-Man franchise

== Last Name ==
- Carolyn Sue, Australian neurologist, scientist, and professor
- Choi Mina Sue (born 1999), South Korean beauty pageant titleholder
- Derald Wing Sue, American psychologist
- Eugène Sue (1804–1857), French writer
- Jack Wong Sue (1925–2009), Chinese Australian member of Z Special Unit
- Jean-Joseph Sue (1760–1830), French medical doctor and surgeon
- Kristina Sue (born 1987), New Zealand dual-code international rugby player
- Louis Süe (1875–1968), French painter, architect, designer and decorator
- Natalie Sue, Canadian writer
- Pierre Sue (1739–1816), French anatomist, librarian and physician
- Sauaso Sue (born 1992), Samoa international rugby league footballer
- Selah Sue (born 1989), Belgian musician and songwriter
- Stanley Sue (1944–2024), American clinical psychologist
- Steve Sue, American software developer, filmmaker, and nonprofit operator
- Sunshine Sue (1912–1979), American musician and radio host
- Vang Sue (1945–1972), Laotian Hmong fighter pilot

== See also ==
- Sue (disambiguation)
- Sioux
- Susie
- Suzie
- Suzy
