= Hobie 16 World Championships =

Hobie Formula 16 Catamaran Worlds

The Hobie 16 World Championships is a bi-annual international sailing regatta for Hobie 16. The event was organized by the host club on behalf of the International Hobie Class Association and since 1987/88 recognized by World Sailing, the sports IOC recognized governing body.

The Hobie 16 Worlds are unusual as the boats are almost always supplied by the organisers/builders this means the class unlike most has a restricted number of entries. This is typical 48 with entries larger this meaning the running of a qualification series before the event. With stand alone female and masters held around the open World Championships utilising the same fleet of charter boats. The class also has a history of not holding regatta at pinnacle yacht clubs but instead finding venue such as hotel and bringing in the race management expertises.

== Editions ==
Event			Host			Sailors			Boats				Ref.
Ed.	Date	Year	Host club	Location	Nat.	No.	Nat.	Cont.	Boats			Mix	Ref.
1	1–6 Nov	1976		Honolulu, Hawaii	United States	168	15	6	84				
2	22–28 Oct	1978		South Padre Island, TX	United States								
3	16–22 Nov	1980		St. Croix	United States Virgin Islands								
4	15–21 Aug	1982		Papeete	Tahiti	96	11	5	48	32	0	14	
5	6–13 Oct	1984		Fort Walton Beach, Florida	United States								
6	3–10 Aug	1986		Suva	Fiji		10+	4+	96				
7	15Jun −3Jul	1988		Scheveningen	Netherlands								
8	7–14 Apr	1991		Langebaan	South Africa								
9	–	1993			Guadeloupe								
10	–	1995		Huatulco, Mexico	Mexico								
11	27Feb −8Mar	1996	Dubai International Marine Club		United Arab Emirates								
12	–	1997	Real Club Marítimo de Sotogrande	Sotogrande	Spain								
13	19–28 Jul	1998		Airlie Beach	Australia								
14	10–22 Apr	2000			Guadeloupe								
15	6–13 Apr	2002		Noumea, New Caledonia	France	166	13	4	83				
16	5–14 May	2004	Barcelo Maya Beach Resort, Cancun	Riviera Maya	Mexico	120	19	6	60				
17	24Oct −4Nov	2005		Port Elizabeth	South Africa	112	17	5	56				
18	8–19 Oct	2007		Suva	Fiji	112	17	6	56				
19	15–30 Aug	2010		Weihai	China	112	15	6	56				
20	–	2014		Jervis Bay	Australia	224	22	6	112				
21	29May −13Jun	2016		Dapeng	China	112	15	6	56				
22	1–16 Nov	2019		Captiva Island, Florida	United States	192	19	6	96	20	4	72	
23	15–29 Sep	2022	Club de Vela La Ballena Alegre	Sant Pere Pescador Catalonia	Spain	192	19	5	96	24	1	71	

== Medalists ==
Year	Gold	Silver	Bronze	Ref.
1976 – Open	Dean Froome (USA); John Driscoll (USA)	Richard Loufek (USA); Jeff Canepa (USA)	Harold Hutchings (USA); Howard Lynn (USA)	
1978 – Open	Mick Whitehead (RSA); Colin Whitehead (RSA)	Russ Eddington (USA); Billy Smith (USA)	Dean Froome (USA); John Driscoll (USA)	
1980 – Open	Brett Dryland (AUS); Jason Hardman (AUS)	Blaine Dodds (RSA); Shaun Ferry (RSA)	Enque Figueroa (PUR); Carlos Junco (PUR)	
1982 – Open	Hobie Atler Jnr. (USA); Patty Mcguire (USA)	Blaine Dodds (RSA); Shawn Ferry (RSA)	Brett Dryland (AUS); Darren Jones (AUS)	
1984 – Open	Gary Metcalfe (AUS); Chris Metcalfe (AUS)	Brett Dryland (AUS); Scott Wood (AUS)	Ian Bashford (AUS); J. Bashford (AUS)	
1986 – Open	Gary Metcalfe (AUS); UNKNOWN	Enrique Figueroa (PUR); UNKNOWN	Jeff Alter (USA); UNKNOWN	
1988 – Open	Gary Metcalfe (AUS); Brian Miers (AUS)	Jeff Alter (USA); Sue Kelly (USA)	Alan Egusa (USA) ???? Pesane (USA)	
1991 – Open	David Kruyt (RSA); Michelle Van Der Merwe (RSA)	Blaine Dodds (RSA); Steve Arnold (RSA)	William Edwards (RSA); Tony Gradwell (RSA)	
1993 – Open	Shaun Ferry (RSA); Shelly Polson (RSA)	Claudio Cardojo (BRA); Frederico Monteiro (BRA)	Carlton Tucker (USA); Jim Sajdak (USA)	
1995 – Open	Aaron Worrall (AUS); David Sylvester (AUS)	Claudio Cardoso (BRA); Frederico Monteiro (BRA)	Shaun Ferry (RSA); Alison Ball (Nee Lewis) (RSA)	
1996 – Open	Claudio Cardoso (BRA); Frederico Monterio (BRA)	William Edwards (RSA); Lucinda Edwards (RSA)	Aaron Worrall (AUS); David Sylvester (AUS)	
1997 – Open	Gwenael Roth (FRA); Thierry Monfret (FRA)	Philippe Hars (TAH); Maxime Pouvreau (TAH)	Mark Laruffa (ITA); Liz Wardley (PNG)	
1998 – Open	Blaine Dodds (RSA); Steve Arnold (RSA)	Michael Butler (AUS); Linda De Bievre (AUS); Liz Wardley (PNG)	Brett Dryland (AUS); Tracy Woods (AUS)	
2000 – Open	Herve Bride (TAH); Thierry Bride (TAH)	Claude Thellier (FRA); Laurence Imbert (FRA)	Francois Morvan (FRA); Matthieu Vandame (FRA)	
2002 – Open	Thibaut Vauchel (FRA); Matheas Lassnig (25x17px)	Tim Shuwalow (AUS); Susan Pearce (AUS)	Robert Engwirda (AUS); Bradley Wilson (AUS)	
2004 – Open	Axel Silvy (FRA); Pauline Jupin (FRA)	Gavin Colby (AUS); Simone Mattfield (AUS)	Andrew Keag (AUS); Naomi Angwin (AUS)	
2005 – Open	Shaun Ferry (RSA); Michele Le Sueur (RSA)	Blaine Dodds (RSA); Roxanne Dodds (RSA)	Ingo Delius (GER); Katrin Wiese-Dohse (GER)	
2007 – Open	Michael Butler (AUS); Susan Etherington (AUS)	Christophe Renaud (FRA); Alban Rossollin (FRA)	Cam Owen (AUS); Susan Ferris (AUS)	
2010 – Open	Jerome Legal (FRA); Enrick Obert (FRA)	Gavin Colby (AUS); Sasha Marks (AUS)	Darren Smith (AUS); Jasmine Hill (AUS)	
2014 – Open	Gavin Colby (AUS); Josie Mark (AUS)	Cam Owen (AUS); Suzzi Ghent (AUS)	Jerome Le Gal (NCL); Marco Iazzetta (NCL)	
2016 – Open	Daniel Bjornholt (DEN); Josephine Frederiksen (DEN)	Orion Gilles Martin (FRA); Nadine Wieland (FRA)	Fletcher Warren-Myers (AUS); Georgia Warren-Myers (AUS)	
2019 – Open	Yamil Saba (VEN); Gonzalo Cendra (VEN)	Nicolaj Bjornholt (DEN); Michelle Jensen (DEN)	Gavin Colby (AUS); Worst News (AUS)	
2022 – Open	Cam Owen (AUS); Susan Ghent (AUS)	Yamil Saba Fuentes (VEN); Gonzalo Cendra Falcon (VEN)	Darren Smith (AUS); Claire Bisgood (AUS)	

=== Women's ===
Year	Gold	Silver	Bronze
1989 Chicago	Puerto Rico	United States	Australia
1992 Bear Lake	Puerto Rico	United States	United States
1995 Huatulco	United States; Annie Nelson; Shala Youngerman	United States; Susan Korzeniewski; Loralee Smith	France; Gael Mercier; Caroline Maby
1996 Dubai	Australia; Kerry Ireland; Jennifer Dickson	United States; Amilee Larcher; Susan Welch	South Africa; Inge Schabort; Gillian Ansley
1997 Sotogrande	France; Frédérique Pfeiffer; Françoise Dettling	Germany; Gaby Hansen; Gönna Dörhage	Germany; Ulla Becker; Dagmar Albera
1998 Airlie Beach	Australia; Kerry Ireland; Jacinta Tonner	France; Frédérique Pfeiffer; Françoise Dettling	New Caledonia; Emmanuelle Merto; Monique Chollet
2000 Petit-Bourg	France; Frédérique Pfeiffer; Françoise Dettling	Germany; Ulla Becher; Dagmar Albers	France; Birgit Krahe; Marie San Nguyen Canh
2002 Nouméa	New Caledonia; Lauren Pelen; Lea Jeandott	Australia; Belinda Zanesco; Naomi Angwin	New Caledonia; Charlotte Picou; Lauren Beaumont
2004 Riviera Maya	Mexico; Pamela Noriega; Martha Noriega	Puerto Rico; Rosarito Martinez; Kamil Berrios	Australia; Belinda Zanesco; Nicky Souter
