= U of S =

U of S may refer to:

in Austria

- University of Salzburg

in Bulgaria

- University of Sofia, otherwise known as Sofia University

in Canada

- University of Saskatchewan

in the Philippines

- University of Silliman, otherwise known as Silliman University

in South Africa

- University of Stellenbosch, otherwise known as Stellenbosch University

in Sweden

- University of Stockholm, otherwise known as Stockholm University

in Thailand

- University of Silapakorn, otherwise known as Silpakorn University

in the United Kingdom

- University of Southampton, otherwise known as Southampton University
- University of Sussex, otherwise known as Sussex University

in the United States

- University of Seattle, otherwise known as Seattle University
- University of Seton Hall, otherwise known as Seton Hall University
- University of Shippensburg, otherwise known as Shippensburg University of Pennsylvania
- Sewanee, The University of the South
- South University
- University of Stanford, otherwise known as Stanford University
- University of Syracuse, otherwise known as Syracuse University
- University of Scranton

== See also ==
- UdeS
- US (disambiguation)
- SU (disambiguation)
