= Kazuma Eekman =

Dutch-Japanese contemporary artist

Kazuma Eekman is a Dutch-Japanese contemporary artist from Rotterdam, the Netherlands. He graduated in 2014 from the Willem de Kooning Academy and is known for his illustrations in different Dutch newspapers and magazines such as De Volkskrant and het NRC among others. Eekman participated in different group expositions, with the biggest and most recent being UU&ME in the spacious W139 at the Warmoesstraat, in Amsterdam, the Netherlands together with five other young artists; initiator Sue van Geijn and, Emile Hermans, Iris Schutgevaar, Diedrik Sibma and Roos Wijma.
