= UK Crop Microbiome Cryobank =

The UK Crop Microbiome Cryobank is a scientific repository and data resource that aims to improve soil and crop health by focusing on plant microbiomes. The cryobank provides a bank of cultures, resources, and information to facilitate research into optimizing plant yields using a sustainable agricultural approach.

The UK Crop Microbiome Cryobank targets six of the UK’s key crops and supports the Biotechnology and Biological Sciences Research Council (BBSRC) strategic priorities in agriculture and food security. It also aligns with three of the UN’s Sustainable Development Goals. The cryobank uses cryo-research techniques to preserve the crop microbiome samples. Subsequent data outcomes from the resource's pipelines have mapped how environmental variables and host plant genotypes select functional rhizosphere microbial community structures.

== Scope ==
The repository specifically includes sample collections from six distinct UK crop systems:

- Spring wheat (Triticum aestivum)
- Spring barley (Hordeum vulgare)
- Oats (Avena sativa)
- Fava bean (Vicia faba)
- Oilseed rape (Brassica napus)
- Sugar beet (Beta vulgaris)

== AgMicrobiomeBase ==
The physical repository operates in tandem with AgMicrobiomeBase, a curated, open-access bioinformatics portal. The database links physical cryopreserved samples directly with genomic, metagenomic, and environmental data, allowing tracking of sample provenance, historical crop rotations, and soil chemistry variables.

Molecular profiling within the platform to detail bacterial, archaeal, fungal, and viral community distributions at the root interface. The system architecture is designed to map internal collection catalogs to public data repositories, including the European Nucleotide Archive (ENA), MGnify, and BioSamples. The portal also supplies reference datasets for the assembly and validation of crop-associated synthetic microbial communities (SynComs) engineered for plant-growth promotion traits.

== Consortium partners ==
The physical facility is centered at the headquarters of CABI, which manages the overarching repository curation and long-term storage logistics. Research work packages, field trial coordination, and downstream sequencing analyses are shared among five collaborating UK research institutes:

- CABI (Project management, cryopreservation, and core facility hosting)
- Rothamsted Research (Sample collection, field agronomy, and DNA extraction)
- Scotland's Rural College (SRUC) (Sequence compilation and downstream phenotypic validation)
- The James Hutton Institute (Bioinformatics pipeline development and primary sequence analyses)
- The John Innes Centre (In association with the University of East Anglia; functional screening and synthetic community construction)

Samples for these systems were gathered from nine geographic locations across the UK to account for variations across three major soil texture classes, yielding a synchronized collection of soil and rhizosphere material alongside a repository of over 24,000 live bacterial and fungal isolates.

== Methodology and curation ==
The repository utilizes a dual-approach preservation strategy to protect both isolated target strains and complex, intact microbial communities. Individual bacterial and fungal isolates are cryopreserved at −80 °C or under liquid nitrogen regimes using optimized cryoprotectant matrices to ensure long-term phenotypic viability. For complex whole-microbiome matrices, whole soil cores and rhizosphere washes are locked down directly using specialized preserving agents to freeze the functional genetic profiles intact, allowing for retrospective extraction of intact metagenomic DNA and RNA.

Baseline crop sampling follows a structured matrix designed to separate host genotype effects from soil chemistry influences. Field samples are gathered from across diverse soil textures, including clay, loam, and sandy soils, capturing variations across broad geographical regions in the UK. By isolating the root-associated soil (rhizosphere), the endosphere, and surrounding bulk soil profiles, the curation workflow establishes a validated benchmark. This allows researchers to study how distinct soil legacies interact with specific plant selections to drive plant growth-promoting traits and functional community profiles.

=== Project infrastructure and authorship ===
The development of the cryobank's physical and digital architecture was executed by a core group of researchers across the consortium. The structural framework was established by principal investigators Matthew J. Ryan (CABI), Tim H. Mauchline (Rothamsted Research), Nicola Holden (Scotland's Rural College), and Jacob G. Malone (John Innes Centre). The design and engineering of the underlying bioinformatics workflows and the AgMicrobiomeBase data portal were led by bioinformatician Payton T. O. Yau alongside computational biologist Susan Jones at the James Hutton Institute. Additional downstream phenotypic validation and community analysis workflows were managed by senior researchers including Rodrigo G. Taketani, J. Miguel Bonnin, Helen Stewart, and Catriona M. A. Thompson.
