= Jack Driscoll =

Jack Driscoll may refer to:

- Jack Driscoll (American football) (born 1997), American football offensive lineman
- Jack Driscoll (character), a fictional character in the King Kong franchise

== See also ==
- John Driscoll (disambiguation)
