= Karahalios =

Karahalios (Greek: Καραχάλιος) is a surname. Notable people with the surname include:

- Belinda Karahalios (born 1982), Canadian politician
- Jim Karahalios, Canadian politician
- Karrie Karahalios, American computer scientist
- Sue Karahalios (born 1949), American politician
- Zisis Karahalios (born 1996), Greek footballer
