= Sioux (disambiguation) =

The Sioux (pronounced "soo") are a Native American people.

Sioux may also refer to:

== Places in the United States ==
- Sioux, Wisconsin, an unincorporated community
- Sioux City, Iowa
- Sioux Falls, South Dakota
- Sioux County (disambiguation)
- Sioux Township (disambiguation)

== Military ==
- USS Sioux, several ships in the United States Navy
- HMCS Sioux (R64), a Royal Canadian Navy destroyer which served in the Second World War
- Bell H-13 Sioux, an American helicopter

== Transportation ==
- Sioux (passenger train)
- Sioux (steamship)

== Other uses ==
- Nia Sioux (born 2001), American dancer and actress
- Sioux language, spoken in the United States and Canada
- Siouxsie Sioux, English musician
- Sioux barley, a 6-row barley variety

== See also ==
- Sault (disambiguation)
- Soo (disambiguation)
- Sue (disambiguation)
- Su (disambiguation)
