= Sioux Valley Township =

Sioux Valley Township may refer to one of the following places in the United States:

- Sioux Valley Township, Jackson County, Minnesota
- Sioux Valley Township, Union County, South Dakota

See also

- Sioux Township (disambiguation)
