= Soo =

Soo or SOO may refer to:

== Places ==
- Sault Ste. Marie, Ontario, a border city in Canada nicknamed "The Soo"
- Sault Ste. Marie, Michigan, a border city in the United States also nicknamed "The Soo"
  - Soo Locks, the locks between Lake Superior and the lower Great Lakes
- Soo Township, Michigan, United States
- Soo, Kagoshima, a city in Japan
  - Soo District, Kagoshima, a district in Japan
- Sóo, a village in the Canary Islands
- Søo, a river in Norway
- Soo River, a tributary of the Green River in British Columbia, Canada
- Strood railway station, Kent, England (National Rail station code)

== People ==
- Su (surname), a Chinese surname also spelled "Soo"
- Soo (Korean name), a Korean surname and given name
- Jack Soo (1917–1979; born Goro Suzuki), Japanese-American actor
- Janar Soo (born 1991), Estonian basketball player
- Phillipa Soo (born 1990), American actress
- Rezső Soó (1903–1980), Hungarian botanist
- "Soo", a nickname of William Sousa Bridgeforth (1907–2004), American Black league baseball team owner

== Other ==
- Soo language, the Kuliak language of the Tepes people of northeastern Uganda
- Soo (film), a 2007 South Korean film
- Soo (puppet), a British panda puppet and TV character
- Rugby League State of Origin (SOO), an Australian rugby league competition
- Soldiers of Odin (SOO), a street patrol group
- Soo Line (disambiguation), several railroads
- Scottish Orange Order, Protestant fraternity

== See also ==
- Sioux, a Native American and First Nations people in North America
- Sioux (disambiguation)
- Sault (disambiguation)
- Sue (disambiguation)
- Su (disambiguation)
