= Eber Phelps =

American politician (born 1951)

Member of the Kansas House of Representatives from the 111th district 1997 to 2012
- In office January 9, 2017 – January 14, 2019
- Preceded by: Sue Boldra
- Succeeded by: Barbara Wasinger

Member of the Kansas Legislature from the 111th district
- In office 1997 to 2013
- Preceded by: Delbert Gross
- Succeeded by: Sue Boldra

Hays City Commission
- In office 1990 to 1997 2013 to 2020

Personal details
- Born: October 17, 1951 (age 74) Hays, Kansas, U.S.
- Party: Democratic
- Spouse: Joni
- Education: Fort Hays State University

Eber Phelps is an American politician who was elected to the Kansas House of Representatives from 1997 to 2012 and then again from 2017 to 2019, both times as a Democrat. Before serving in the Kansas Legislature, he served as a Hays City Commissioner from 1990 to 1997, and then was appointed to fill the seat vacated by Wasinger who had been elected to the Ellis County Commission, he served from 2013 to 2020 and served as Mayor of Hays multiple times.

== Elections ==
Phelps began serving in 1997, was defeated in 2012 by Sue Boldra, and regained his old seat from her in the 2016 election. He served as the Minority Whip in his most recent term, 2017–2018.

He was defeated for reelection in 2018, by Republican Barb Wasinger, in an extremely close race. Wasinger originally was found to have won by 32 votes. A recount and certification, protested by the local sheriff, who was on the three-person elections board, found her margin increased to 35 votes.

Phelps works in sales and marketing for the Glassman Corporation. Prior to his election to the House, Phelps served as mayor of Hays, Kansas and was also on the Hays City Commission.

== Committee membership ==
- Education
- Veterans, Military and Homeland Security
- Aging and Long Term Care
- Legislative Budget

== Major donors ==
The top 5 donors to Phelp's 2008 campaign:

- 1. Kansas Medical Society $1,000
- 2. Kansas Contractors Association $1,000
- 3. Kansas National Education Association $750
- 4. Kansas Hospital Association $750
- 5. American Federation of Teachers KS PAC $500
