= Saulx =

Saulx may refer to:

- Saulx (river), a river in France
- Saulx, Haute-Saône, France
- Saulx-le-Duc, Côte-d'Or, France
- Saulx-lès-Champlon, Meuse, France
- Saulx-les-Chartreux, Essonne, France
- Saulx-Marchais, Yvelines, France
- Gaspard de Saulx (1509–1575), French military leader

== See also ==
- Sault (disambiguation)
