= Sue =

Sue or SUE may refer to:

== Music ==
- Sue Records, an American record label
- Sue (album), an album by Frazier Chorus
- "Sue (Or in a Season of Crime)", a song by David Bowie

== Places ==
- Sue Islet (Queensland), one of the Torres Straits islands, Australia
- Sue, Fukuoka, a town in Japan
  - Sue Station (Fukuoka), a railway station
- Sue Lake, a lake in Glacier National Park, Montana, United States

== People with the surname ==
- Carolyn Sue, Australian physician-scientist
- Eugène Sue (1804–1857), French novelist
- Henry Sue, claimant in Sue v Hill, an Australian law case
- Jean-Joseph Sue (1710–1792), French physician and anatomist
- Jean-Joseph Sue (1760–1830), French physician and anatomist
- Sauaso Sue (born 1992), New Zealand-Samoan rugby league player
- Selah Sue (born 1989), Belgian musician and songwriter

== Other uses ==
- Suing (to sue), a type of lawsuit
- Sue (name), a feminine given name (and list of people with the name)
- Sué, a god of the Andean Muisca civilization
- Sue (dinosaur), a Tyrannosaurus rex specimen
- Sue Lost in Manhattan or Sue, a 1998 film
- Subsurface Utility Engineering
- Sue ware, ancient Japanese pottery
- ARC (file format) or .sue
- Door County Cherryland Airport's IATA code
- Mary Sue or Sue, an idealized fictional character
- United States of Europe (electoral list) (Stati Uniti d'Europa), pro-European electoral list in Italy
- Yoshiko Tanaka or Sue (1956–2011), Japanese actress

== See also ==
- Sault (disambiguation)
- Sioux, a Native American and First Nations people in North America
- Sioux (disambiguation)
- Soo (disambiguation)
- Su (disambiguation)
- Susan
- , listing many people with forename "Sue"
