= Brilliant (website) =

Online educational website

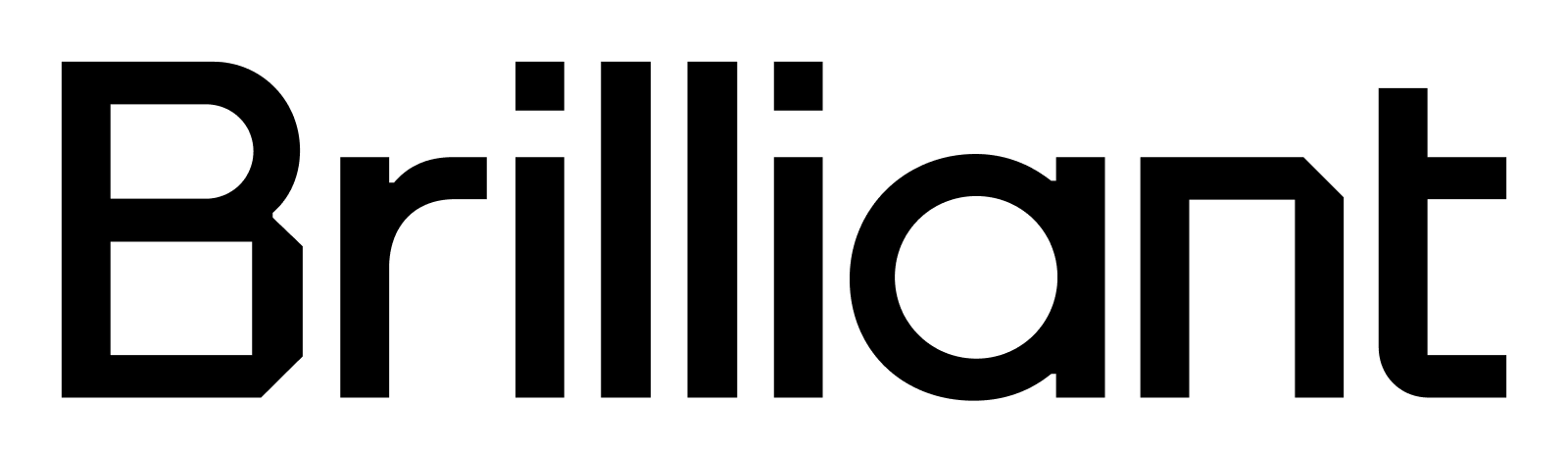
- Website type: Online education
- Available in: English
- Founder: Sue Khim
- Website: brilliant.org
- Commercial: Yes
- Users: ▲10 million (2025)
- Launched: 2012; 14 years ago
- Current status: Active

Brilliant.org is an American for-profit company and associated community that features 90+ guided courses in three categories: maths, computer science and science. Brilliant operates via a freemium business model.

== History ==
Brilliant was founded in 2012. At the Launch Festival in March 2013, CEO and co-founder Sue Khim presented the idea of Brilliant, attracting funding from venture capitalist Chamath Palihapitiya. In August 2013, TechCrunch reported that Brilliant.org had secured funding from Palihapitiya's Social+Capital Partnership, as well as from 500 Startups, Kapor Capital, Learn Capital, and Hyde Park Angels. The website boasted over 100,000 users at that time. By April 2019, it had achieved a valuation of $50 million.

Originally, Brilliant hosted a variety of individual puzzles and occasionally monthly challenges. At one point, the individual puzzles included their Problem of the Week, a selection of the 15 best puzzles for the week. By 2025, the focus of the site was on active learning in STEM fields, as opposed to rote learning, and it does not support learning certifications. Further, the platform does not support any individual mentorship, though "courses are curated by industry experts".

As of October 2026, the monthly cost was US$45. A discount applies for annual subscriptions.

Brilliant.org has a ranking system called leagues. They begin and end every Monday at 3 AM UTC (Sunday at 8 PM PDT/11 PM EDT during daylight saving time, or 7 PM PST/10 PM EST during standard time). Each player is placed into a league with 29 other players and can either progress up to the next league, stay in the same league, or be relegated to the previous league, depending on their rank within the league, which is based on their XP. In ascending order, the leagues are: Hydrogen, Lithium, Carbon, Neon, Titanium, Xenon, Barium, Neodymium, Tungsten and Einsteinium.

== Reception ==
Several publications have noted Brilliant for its success in identifying gifted students. Commonly cited examples include Farrell Wu from the Philippines, Dylan Toh of Singapore, and Phoebe Cai of the United States.

Brilliant regularly contributes math and science puzzles to publications such as The New York Times, The Guardian, and FiveThirtyEight. Brilliant has also been cited by The Atlantic as a catalyst of the "math revolution" - a surge in the number of American teens excelling at math.

In 2013, Brilliant co-founder and CEO Sue Khim was listed among the Forbes 30 under 30 for the Education category for her work on Brilliant.

== Acquisition ==
In December 2022, Brilliant acquired Hellosaurus, a software and entertainment company that distributes interactive programming for kids from various children's creators such as The Wiggles, and Kids Diana.

== See also ==
- Wikiversity
- Khan Academy
- Skillshare
- List of online educational resources
