= Edith Franklin Wyatt =

American writer

- Wyatt, from a 1901 publication
- Born: September 14, 1873; Tomah, Wisconsin, U.S.
- Died: October 26, 1958 (aged 85); Chicago, Illinois, U.S.
- Occupation: Writer

Edith Franklin Wyatt (September 14, 1873 – October 26, 1958) was an American novelist and poet based in Chicago.

== Biography ==
Edith Franklin Wyatt was born on September 14, 1873, in Tomah, Wisconsin, the daughter of Franklin Wyatt and Marion LaGrange Wyatt. Her family moved to Chicago when she was young. She attended Miss Rice's Higher School for Girls, in Chicago, and studied at Bryn Mawr College from 1892 to 1894. In Chicago, she taught at Hull House.

Wyatt died on October 26, 1958, in Chicago, and was buried at Graceland Cemetery. Her papers are at the University of Chicago and the Newberry Library.

== Publications ==
Wyatt wrote novels and poetry, and reviewed books for the Chicago Tribune and other publications. She and Sue Ainslie Clark wrote a 1910 study of the lives of working women in New York, published first as a series in McClure's and then in book form in 1911.

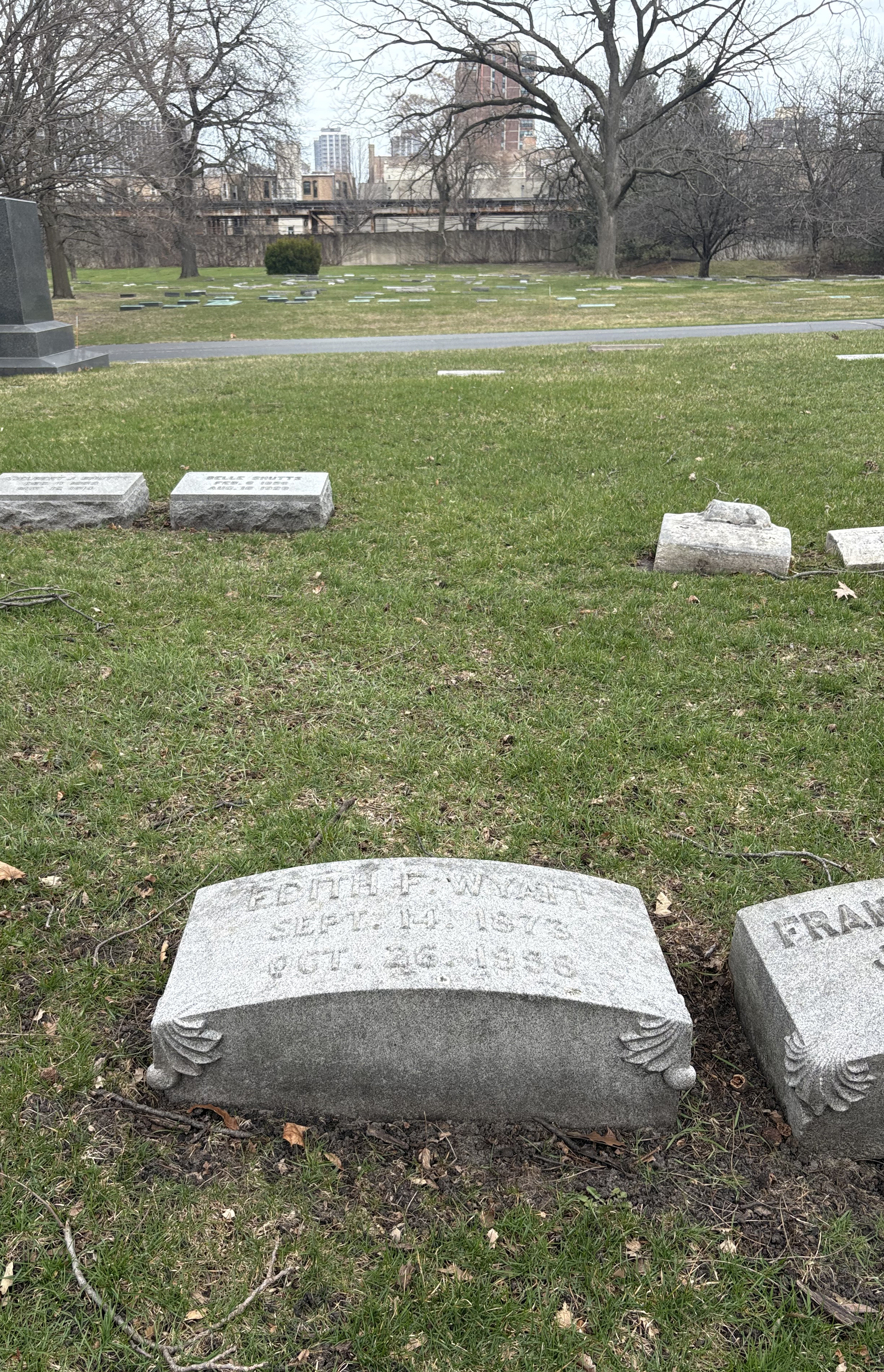
Wyatt's grave at Graceland Cemetery

=== Fiction ===
- Every One His Own Way (1901, short stories)
- True Love (1903)
- The Whole Family (collaborative novel, 1908)
- "A Failure" (short story, 1920)
- The Invisible Gods (1923, novel)
- The Satyr's Children: A Fable (1939)

=== Poetry ===
- "The August Sky" (1914)
- "April Weather" and "Summer Hail" (1915)
- The Wind in the Corn and other poems (1917)

=== Non-fiction ===
- "Working Girls' Budgets" (1910, with Sue Ainslie Clark)
- Making Both Ends Meet: The Income and Outlay of New York Working Girls (with Sue Ainslie Clark, 1911)
- Great Companions (1917)
- "The Rescue at Cherry" (1925)
- "Letters Reveal Howells as World Yankee" (1928, book review)
