= Nicole Greer =

American politician

Member-elect of the Missouri House of Representatives from the 71st district
- Assuming office January 6, 2027
- Succeeding: LaDonna Appelbaum

Personal details
- Party: Democratic
- Website: votegreer.com

Nicole Greer is an American politician of the Missouri Democratic Party who is the representative-elect for the 71st district in the Missouri House of Representatives. She was elected in the 2026 general election. Greer served on the Creve Coeur City Council from 2020 to 2024.
