= SU =

SU, Su or su may refer to:

== Arts and entertainment ==
- Su (Shugo Chara!), a fictional character in the manga series Shugo Chara!
- Sinclair User, a magazine
- Steven Universe, an American animated television series on Cartoon Network
- StumbleUpon, a web discovery service

== Businesses and organizations ==
- Aeroflot, a Russian airline
- Scripture Union, a Christian organisation
- Socialist Youth (Norway), a Norwegian youth league
- Sukhoi, a Russian aircraft company

== Language ==
- Su (kana)
- Sú (cuneiform), a sign in cuneiform writing
- Sundanese Language, ISO 639-1 code: su

== People ==
- Su (surname), 蘇 or 苏, a Chinese surname
- Soo (Korean name), 수, also spelled Su
- Elif Su İltaş (born 2011), Turkish female arm wrestler

== Places ==
- Su, Catalonia, a village in Spain
- Su, Iran, a village in Kurdistan Province, Iran
- Jiangsu (abbr. Sū, 苏), province of the People's Republic of China
  - Suzhou, Jiangsu (abbr. Sū, 苏), city in Jiangsu province
- Soviet Union (former ISO country code)
- Subotica, a city in Serbia (license plate code SU)

== Science, technology, and mathematics ==
=== Archaeology ===
- Stratigraphic unit

=== Astronomy ===
- Gliese 486 b, an exoplanet with the proper name Su

=== Computing ===
- .su, country code top-level domain for the Soviet Union
- su (Unix), the substitute user command
- Seismic Unix, a collection of seismic data processing tools
- Subscriber unit, any radio device used to connect to a high-speed network access point
- Superuser, a privileged computer user account

=== Mathematics ===
- Special unitary group, a term used in algebra, SU(n)
  - the corresponding Special unitary group § Lie algebra, $\mathfrak{su}(n)$

=== Vehicles ===
- Vought SU, a US Navy Scout aircraft
- SU carburetor
- Samokhodnaya Ustanovka, a self-propelled gun

== Universities ==
=== Bulgaria ===
- Sofia University in Sofia

=== China ===
- Shandong University in Jinan, Shandong
- Shanxi University in Taiyuan, Shanxi
- Shanghai University in Shanghai
- Sichuan University in Chengdu, Sichuan
- Soochow University (Suzhou) in Suzhou, Jiangsu

=== India ===
- Sharda University in Greater Noida, Uttar Pradesh

=== Indonesia ===
- Surya University in Tangerang, Indonesia

=== Iran ===
- Shiraz University in Shiraz

=== Japan ===
- Sophia University in Tokyo

=== Pakistan ===
- Sargodha University in Sargodha
- Sindh University in Jamshoro
- Superior University in Lahore

=== Philippines ===
- Silliman University in Dumaguete City, Negros Oriental

=== South Africa ===
- Stellenbosch University in Stellenbosch

=== South Korea ===
- Sogang University in Seoul

=== Sweden ===
- Stockholm University in Stockholm

=== Thailand ===
- Silpakorn University in Bangkok

=== Turkey ===
- Sabancı University in Istanbul

=== United Kingdom ===
- Sheffield University in Sheffield, South Yorkshire
- Staffordshire University in Staffordshire

=== United States ===
- Salisbury University in Salisbury, Maryland
- Samford University in Birmingham, Alabama
- Seattle University in Seattle, Washington
- Seton Hall University in South Orange, New Jersey
- Shenandoah University in Winchester, Virginia
- Shippensburg University of Pennsylvania in Shippensburg, Pennsylvania
- Singularity University in California
- South University in Savannah, Georgia
- Southern University in Baton Rouge, Louisiana
- Southwestern University in Georgetown, Texas
- Stanford University in Stanford, California
- Stevenson University in Stevenson and Owings Mills, Maryland
- Syracuse University in Syracuse, New York

== Other uses ==
- Shankill United F.C., football club in Northern Ireland
- Statens Uddanneslsesstøtte, a government grant for students in Denmark
- Egypt (aircraft registration prefix SU)
- Sunday

== See also ==
- Sioux, a Native American and First Nations people in North America
- Sioux (disambiguation)
- Sue (disambiguation)
- Sault (disambiguation)
- Soo (disambiguation)
- US (disambiguation)
