= Sault =

Sault may refer to:

== Places in Europe ==
- Sault, Vaucluse, France
- Saint-Benoît-du-Sault, France
- Canton of Sault, France
- Canton of Saint-Benoît-du-Sault, France
- Sault-Brénaz, France
- Sault-de-Navailles, France
- Sault-lès-Rethel, France
- Sault-Saint-Remy, France

== Places in North America ==
- Sault Ste. Marie, a cross-border region in Canada and the United States
  - Sault Ste. Marie, Ontario, Canada
  - Sault Ste. Marie, Michigan, United States
- Sault College, Ontario, Canada
- Sault Ste. Marie Canal, a National Historic Site of Canada in Sault Ste. Marie, Ontario
- Sault Locks or Soo Locks, a set of parallel locks which enable ships to travel between Lake Superior and the lower Great Lakes operated and maintained by the United States Army Corps of Engineers
- Long Sault, a rapid in the St. Lawrence River
- Long Sault, Ontario, Canada
- Sault-au-Récollet, Montreal, Quebec, Canada
- Grand Sault or Grand Falls, New Brunswick, Canada

== People with the surname ==
- Sault (surname)

== Other uses ==
- Sault (band), a British rhythm and blues music collective
- Sault Tribe of Chippewa Indians, an indigenous community located in what is now known as Michigan's Upper Peninsula
- Saulteaux, a branch of the Ojibwe nation

== See also ==
- Salt (disambiguation)
- Saulx (disambiguation)
- Sioux (disambiguation)
- Soo (disambiguation)
- Sue (disambiguation)
- Su (disambiguation)
