= LaDonna Appelbaum =

American politician

Member of the Missouri House of Representatives from the 71st district
- Incumbent
- Assumed office 9 January 2019
- Preceded by: Sue Meredith
- Succeeded by: Nicole Greer (elect)

Personal details
- Born: February 10, 1967 (age 59) Harrison, Arkansas, U.S.
- Party: Democratic

LaDonna Lynn Appelbaum (born February 10, 1967) is a Democratic member of the Missouri General Assembly, representing the state's 71st House district which covers portions of St. Louis County, Missouri.

== Career ==
Appelbaum won the election on 6 November 2018 from the platform of Democratic Party. She secured seventy-seven percent of the vote while her closest rival Libertarian LaDonna Higgins secured twenty-three percent.

Appelbaum was term-limited in 2026.

== Electoral history ==
Missouri House of Representatives Primary Election, August 7, 2018, District 71
Party	Candidate	Votes	%	±%
Democratic	LaDonna Appelbaum	5,030	85.23%	
Democratic	Boris Abadzhyan	872	14.77%	
Total votes		5,902	100.00%	

Missouri House of Representatives Election, November 6, 2018, District 71
Party	Candidate	Votes	%	±%
Democratic	LaDonna Appelbaum	10,752	77.11%	
Libertarian	LaDonna Higgins	3,191	22.89%	
Total votes		13,943	100.00%	

Missouri House of Representatives Primary Election, August 4, 2020, District 71
Party	Candidate	Votes	%	±%
Democratic	LaDonna Appelbaum	5,269	83.41%	−1.82
Democratic	Boris Abadzhyan	1,048	16.59%	+1.82
Total votes		6,317	100.00%	

Missouri House of Representatives Election, November 3, 2020, District 71
Party	Candidate	Votes	%	±%
Democratic	LaDonna Appelbaum	14,404	100.00%	+22.99
Total votes		14,404	100.00%	

Missouri House of Representatives Election, November 8, 2022, District 71
Party	Candidate	Votes	%	±%
Democratic	LaDonna Appelbaum	10,199	64.00%	−36.00
Republican	Karan Pujji	5,736	36.00%	+36.00
Total votes		15,935	100.00%	
