= John O'Driscoll =

John O'Driscoll may refer to:

- John O'Driscoll (rugby union) (born 1953), former Ireland international rugby union player
- John O'Driscoll (Gaelic footballer) (born 1967), retired Irish sportsperson
- John Francis O'Driscoll, known as Jackie O'Driscoll, Irish footballer

== See also ==
- John Driscoll (disambiguation)
