= John Driscoll =

John Driscoll may refer to:

- John Driscoll (jockey), Australian jockey
- John Driscoll (sailor), Irish Olympic sailor
- Denny Driscoll (1855–1886), American baseball player
- Paddy Driscoll (1896–1968), American football quarterback
- John R. Driscoll (1924–2014), American politician
- John S. Driscoll (1934–2019), American journalist, editor of The Boston Globe
- John T. Driscoll (born 1925), American politician
- John Driscoll (Montana politician) (born 1946), former Speaker of the Montana House of Representatives
- John Driscoll (music producer)
- John Driscoll (actor) (born 1981), American actor
- John Gerald Driscoll III (1924–2011), yachtsman and businessman

== See also ==
- Jack Driscoll (character), a fictional character in the King Kong franchise
- Jack Driscoll (American football) (born 1997), American football offensive lineman
- John Driscoll Fitz-Gerald (1873–1946), American Hispanic scholar
- John O'Driscoll (disambiguation)
