= Barb Wasinger =

American politician from Kansas

Member of the Kansas House of Representatives from the 111th district
- Incumbent
- Assumed office January 14, 2019
- Preceded by: Eber Phelps

Ellis County Commission
- In office January 4, 2012 – November 14, 2018
- Preceded by: Glenn D. Diehl
- Succeeded by: Dustin Roths

Hays City Commission
- In office April 28, 2005 – November 15, 2011
- Preceded by: Sunell Koerner
- Succeeded by: Eber Phelps

Personal details
- Born: July 7, 1958 (age 68)
- Party: Republican
- Spouse: Thomas
- Children: 4
- Education: Saint Catherine University

Barbara Wasinger (born July 7, 1958) is an American politician who was elected to the Kansas House of Representatives in 2019 as a Republican.

Prior to serving in the Kansas Legislature, she served as an Ellis County Commissioner, the first woman elected to the county commission. From 2005 to 2012 she served as a city commissioner in Hays, Kansas and served as Mayor of Hays from April 2008 to April 2009 and October 2010 to April 2012. While mayor, she served on the Hays Public Library Board.

2022-2024 Kansas House of Representatives Committee Assignments

- Chair of the Committee on Legislative Modernization
- Vice-chair of the Joint Committee on Administrative Rules and Regulations
- Special Committee on Foreign Trade and Regulatory Sandboxes
- Joint Committee on Information Technology
- Committee on Higher Education Budget
- Committee on Taxation

2020-2021 Kansas House of Representatives Committee Assignments

- Chairman of Joint Administrative Rules and Regulations
- Vice Chairman of Higher Education Budget
- Financial Institutions and Rural Development
- Taxation

2019-2020 Kansas House of Representatives Committee Assignments

- Financial Institutions and Pensions
- Higher Education Budget
- Taxation
- Joint Administrative Rules and Regulations
