= Sue van Geijn =

- Born: September 14, 1988 (age 38); Amsterdam

Sue van Geijn is a Rotterdam, the Netherlands based contemporary artist (14 September 1988 -) born in Amsterdam, and Willem de Kooning Academy graduate.

== Biography ==
Van Geijn is currently part of the artist-run group of the W139 in Amsterdam, wherefore she invited Kazuma Eekman, Emile Hermans, Iris Schutgevaar, Diedrik Sibma and Roos Wijma for the exposition UU&ME that opened on 10 June 2016. She is the co-founder of buro BG "a concept development bureau based in Amsterdam and Rotterdam, the Netherlands" which organised different collaborative events in vacant buildings and the Stadsschouwburg Amsterdam. Her work has been shown among others places at the W139, Route du Nord, Beurs van Berlage, BAK and can be found in different publications and prints such as the calendar 'I am not doing anything until I feel the need' by Joanneke Meester whereby the original works were also shown at the Nederlandse Bank. Her work often includes written texts to establish a connection with the architecture, the viewer, its surroundings or herself, many of which can be found in the public domain such as 'You are here now' and 'Conversations with the building'.
