= Sue Khim =

American education entrepreneur

- Born: 1986 (age 39–40)
- Education: University of Chicago
- Occupation: Education entrepreneur
- Known for: CEO of Brilliant.org

Sue Khim is an American education entrepreneur. She is the co-founder and current CEO of Brilliant.org, an educational platform and online community that features problems and courses in mathematics, physics, quantitative finance, and computer science. She also co-founded edtech start-up Alltuition, which helped students find low-cost college loans and assisted with financial aid forms. In 2012, she was named one of Forbes' 30 Under 30 in education.

== Career ==
Originally from South Korea, Khim immigrated with her family to the United States when she was a baby. She grew up in Chicago and attended public schools.

After studying mathematics for 3 years, Khim left the University of Chicago to start her own company, Alltuition, which sought to simplify the process of obtaining financial aid for students. Khim co-founded Alltuition with 2 others and raised a seed round of funding. Eventually, Khim and company received venture funding and decided to work on something else to expand education for students, which led to the creation of Brilliant.org.

The Alltuition team became Brilliant in October 2012. Brilliant has grown to be an online community of over 4 million users where people learn math and science from each other.

Khim has accounted for the sexism and racism she has faced several times. In 2022, Khim was one of four AAPI leaders highlighted by Apple and commented "We replaced a Victorian education system from 300 years ago with a fun, vibrant world."
