= Sue Jacobs =

New Zealand association football player

Personal information
- Full name: Susan Jacobs
- Date of birth: 1950
- Date of death: 13 July 2012 (aged 61–62)

Senior career*
Years	Team	Apps	(Gls)
	Metro	0	(0)
1974–1977	Auckland	8	

International career^{‡}
1975–1977	New Zealand	13	(0)
- * Club domestic league appearances and goals as of 10 March 2021 ‡ National team caps and goals as of 10 March 2021

Sue Jacobs
Personal information
- Years active: 1969–1984

Sport
- Country: New Zealand
- Sport: Women's softball
- Club: Metro Softball Club

Sue Jacobs (1950 – 13 July 2012) was a dual New Zealand international, having represented the country in both softball and football. Jacobs played under the Auckland Metro Club for both sports, and represented Auckland in both in the national competitions.

== Softball ==
=== Club career ===
Jacobs played for Auckland Metro Softball Club and was named "Auckland Softballer of the Year" in 1972–1973 and 1974–1975. She toured with the club to Australia in 1974–1975. She represented Auckland in the national competition for eleven straight seasons, winning six titles in her first seven years.

=== International career ===
Jacobs was a New Zealand women's international softball player from 1976 to 1978.

== Football ==
=== Club career ===
Jacobs played for Metro in football, when the softball team decided to form a football team as well. They played in the local Auckland competition from 1973. She also represented the Auckland province eight times after making her debut in a 3–0 loss to Wellington in 1974.

=== International career ===
Jacobs was a member of New Zealand's first ever women's team who was invited to play at the 1975 AFC Women's Championship however she didn't end up taking the field. She did end up representing New Zealand, in football, thirteen times between 1975 and 1977.

== Honours ==
New Zealand

- AFC Women's Championship: 1975
