= Warmoesstraat =

Street in Amsterdam

Coordinates: 52°22′31.732″N 4°53′53″E

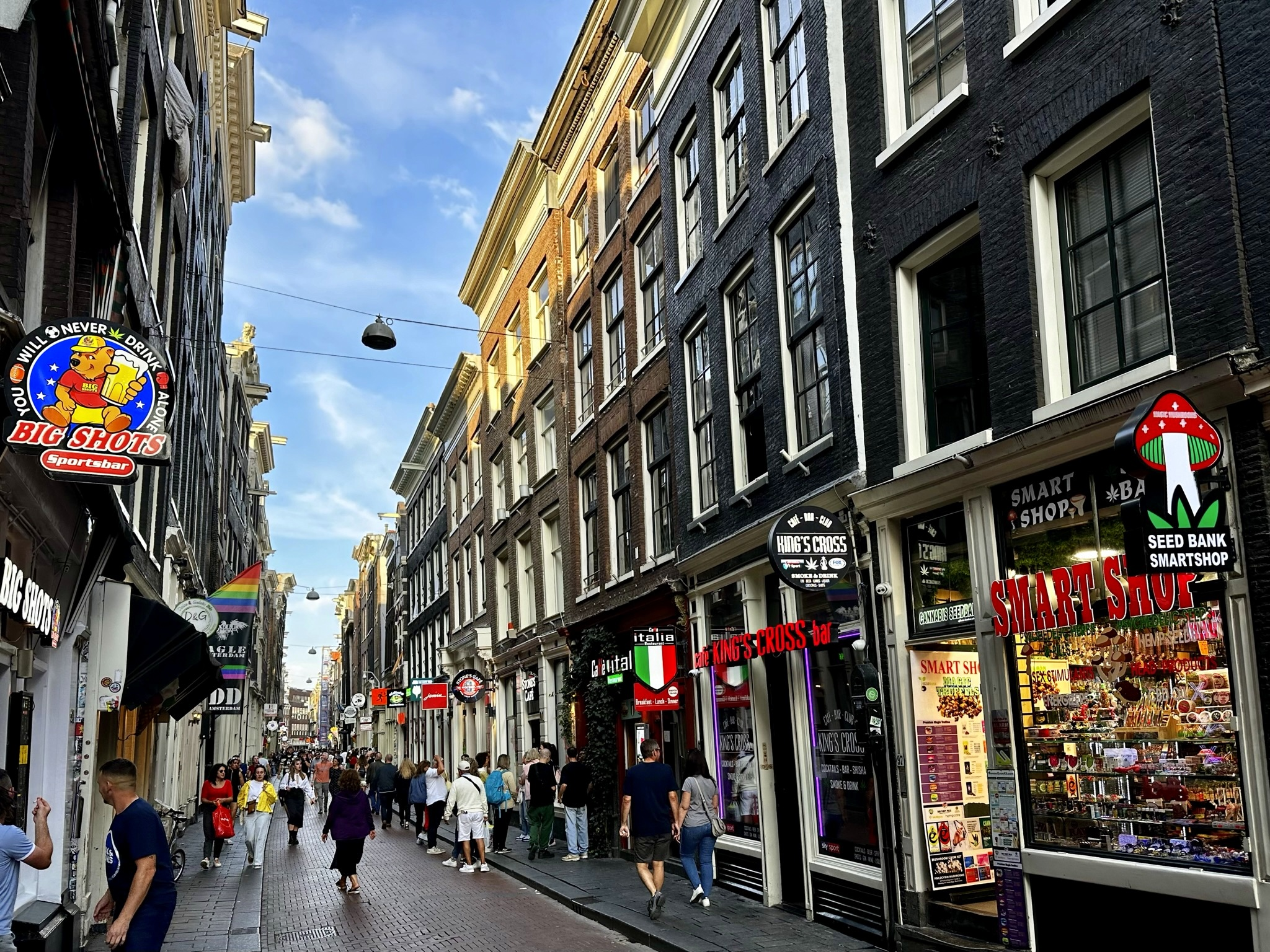
Warmoesstraat in Amsterdam

Warmoesstraat ('Chard Street') is one of the oldest streets in Amsterdam, running parallel to Damrak from Nieuwebrugsteeg to Dam Square. Its origins are in the 13th century. In the 16th and 17th century it was the shopping street. During the Dutch Golden Age, the father of legendary poet and playwright Joost van den Vondel ran a business as a silk merchant there.

Today, the busy Warmoesstraat has a variety of shops, bars, restaurants, cheap hotels, coffee shops and sex boutiques. The artist-run W139 art space is also located on this street. It is located adjacent to the red-light district.

The Warmoesstraat-area is also known as the leather area as there are many cruise and fetish bars and bars with darkrooms. On Warmoesstraat street the first leather bar in the country opened around 1955.
