= Sue Boldra =

American politician (born 1949)

Member of the Kansas House of Representatives from the 111th district
- In office January 14, 2013 – January 9, 2017
- Preceded by: Eber Phelps
- Succeeded by: Eber Phelps

Personal details
- Born: September 9, 1949 (age 76) McPherson County, Kansas, U.S.
- Party: Republican
- Spouse: Carl
- Children: 4
- Education: Fort Hays State University; McPherson College

Sue Boldra (September 9, 1949) is a former member of the Kansas House of Representatives.

== Biography ==
Boldra was born in McPherson County, Kansas. She graduated from high school in Canton, Kansas, as well as McPherson College and Fort Hays State University.

== Career ==
Boldra was a member of the Kansas House of Representatives from 2013 to 2017. She was defeated in the general election on November 8, 2016 by Democratic candidate Eber Phelps. She is a Republican and lives in Hays.
