= Us =

Us, us, uS, or US commonly refers to:

- Us (pronoun), the objective case of the English first-person plural pronoun we
- United States

Us, us, uS, or US may also refer to:

== Arts and entertainment ==
=== Albums ===
- Us (Brother Ali album) or the title song, 2009
- Us (Empress Of album), 2018
- Us (Mull Historical Society album), 2003
- Us (Peter Gabriel album), 1992
- Us (EP), by Moon Jong-up, 2021
- Us, by Maceo Parker, 1974
- Us, mini-album by Peakboy, 2019

=== Songs ===
- "Us" (James Bay song), 2018
- "Us" (Jennifer Lopez song), 2018
- "Us" (Regina Spektor song), 2004
- "Us" (Gracie Abrams song), 2024
- "Us", by Azealia Banks from Fantasea, 2012
- "Us", by Celine Dion from Let's Talk About Love, 1997
- "Us", by Gucci Mane from Delusions of Grandeur, 2019
- "Us", by Spoon from Hot Thoughts, 2017

=== Other media ===
- US Festival, two 1980s California music festivals organized by Steve Wozniak
- Us (1991 film), a television film
- Us (2019 film), a horror film by Jordan Peele
- Us (novel), 2014, by David Nicholls
  - Us (British TV series), a BBC One four-part television comedy series based on the 2014 novel (aired in 2020)
- US (play), 1966, by Peter Brook
- "Us" (The Walking Dead), the 50th episode of the television series The Walking Dead: season 4, episode 15 (of 16)
- Us Weekly, an American celebrity magazine
- Us (Thai TV series), a Thai girls' love television series
- Us (graphic novel), 2021, by Sara Soler

== Schools ==
- University of Salzburg, a university in Austria
- University of Seville, a university in Spain
- Université de Sherbrooke, a university in Canada
- University of Szczecin, a university in Poland
- University School (Ohio), a private all-boys day school in Hunting Valley, Ohio, US

== Businesses and organizations ==
- US Airways (IATA designator US, 1979–2015)
- US Organization, a Black nationalist group in the US founded in 1965
- United Services Club or US Club, a golf club in Mumbai
- United Society, an Anglican charitable organization first founded in 1701
- United Synagogue, the union of British Orthodox synagogues founded in 1870
- Urgences-santé, an ambulance company in Montreal, Canada
- Uniwide Sales, a now-defunct retail operator

== Surname ==
- Elizaveta Us (born 2007), Russian artistic gymnast

== Other uses ==
- .us, Internet top-level domain for the US
- Us, Val-d'Oise, France
- Ultrasound or ultrasonic
- Understudy, in theatre
- Union State, a politico-economic union consisting of the Russian Federation and the Republic of Belarus
- United States Reports, in legal citations
- United States Supreme Court, in legal citations
- Upper Silesia
- Uranium monosulfide
- Ut supra, Latin for "as above"
- Humans

== See also ==
- Microsecond (μs)
- United States (disambiguation)
- Uz (disambiguation)
- SU (disambiguation)
