= Sue Knight =

Australian philosopher, educator and academic

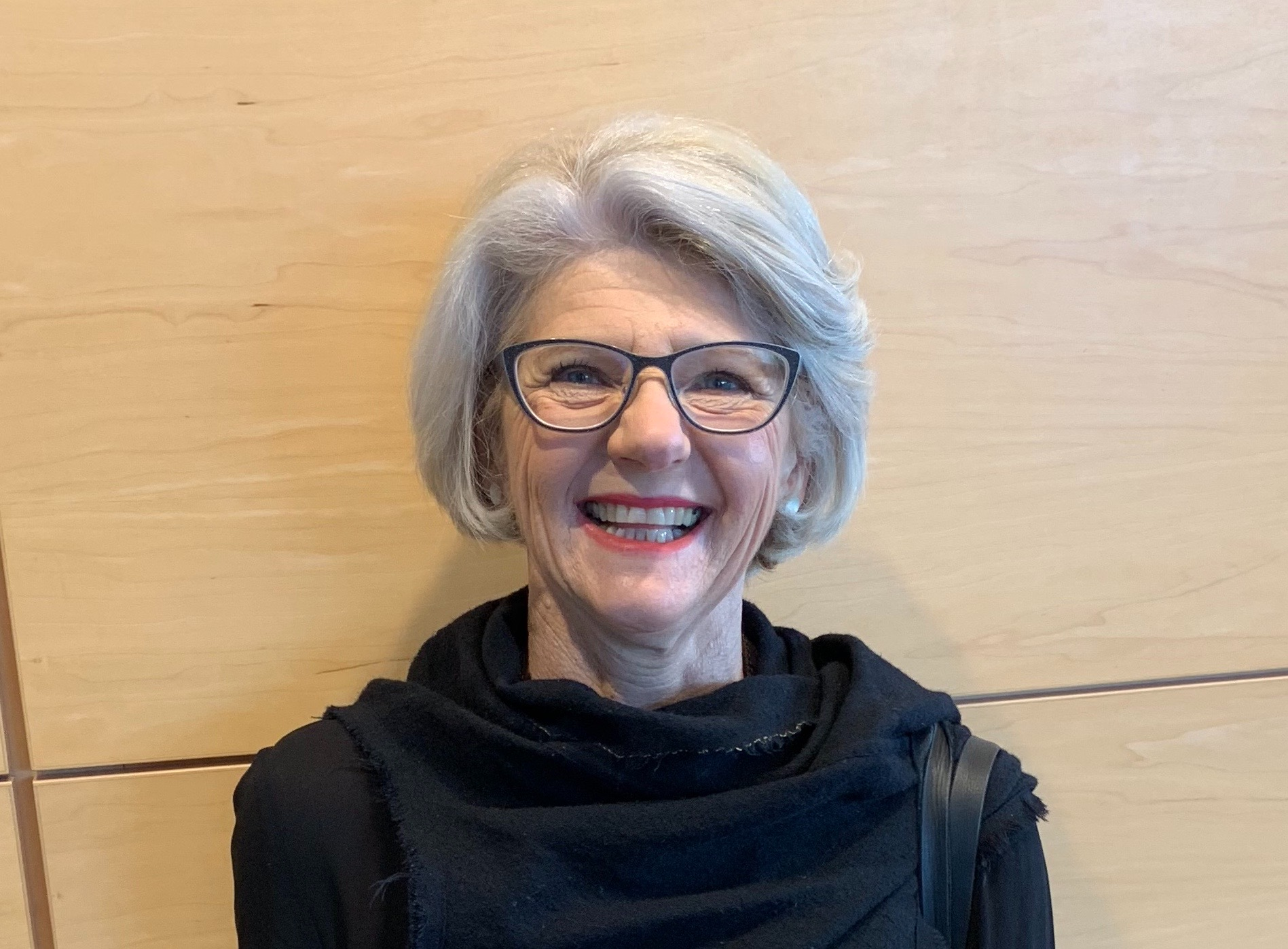
- Sue Knight at Skepticon Australia 13 October 2018
- Education: PhD in Philosophy, Bachelor of Education
- Employer: Primary Ethics
- Notable work: NSW Ethics Course Trial: Final Report

Sue Knight is an Australian philosopher, educator and academic whose research focuses on teaching reasoning skills and embedding philosophy within school curricula. She is the author of the Primary Ethics curriculum, which has been offered as an alternative to Scripture in New South Wales public schools for students from Kindergarten to Year 6 since 2010.

== Education ==
Knight was awarded a PhD in Philosophy in 1978 from the University of Adelaide with a thesis examining "the problem of universals, a fundamental problem within Metaphysics".

In 1981 she earned a Bachelor of Education from the same university. After becoming interested in the work of Matthew Lipman, Knight undertook an advanced training workshop at the Institute for the Advancement of Philosophy for Children (IAPC) founded by Dr Lipman at Montclair State University, New Jersey, USA. The Philosophy for Children program aims to engage students of all ages (from kindergarten to the senior secondary) in philosophical inquiry.

== Career ==
Knight's career has focused on development of justificatory reasoning skills and embedding philosophy within school curricula across the year levels.

"[The] basis of philosophy is …the giving of reasons and the critique of other people's reasons and really what a democratic society needs is people who can reason well and the individual needs that as well."

— Rock Ethics Institute presents an interview with Dr. Sue Knight, 2015

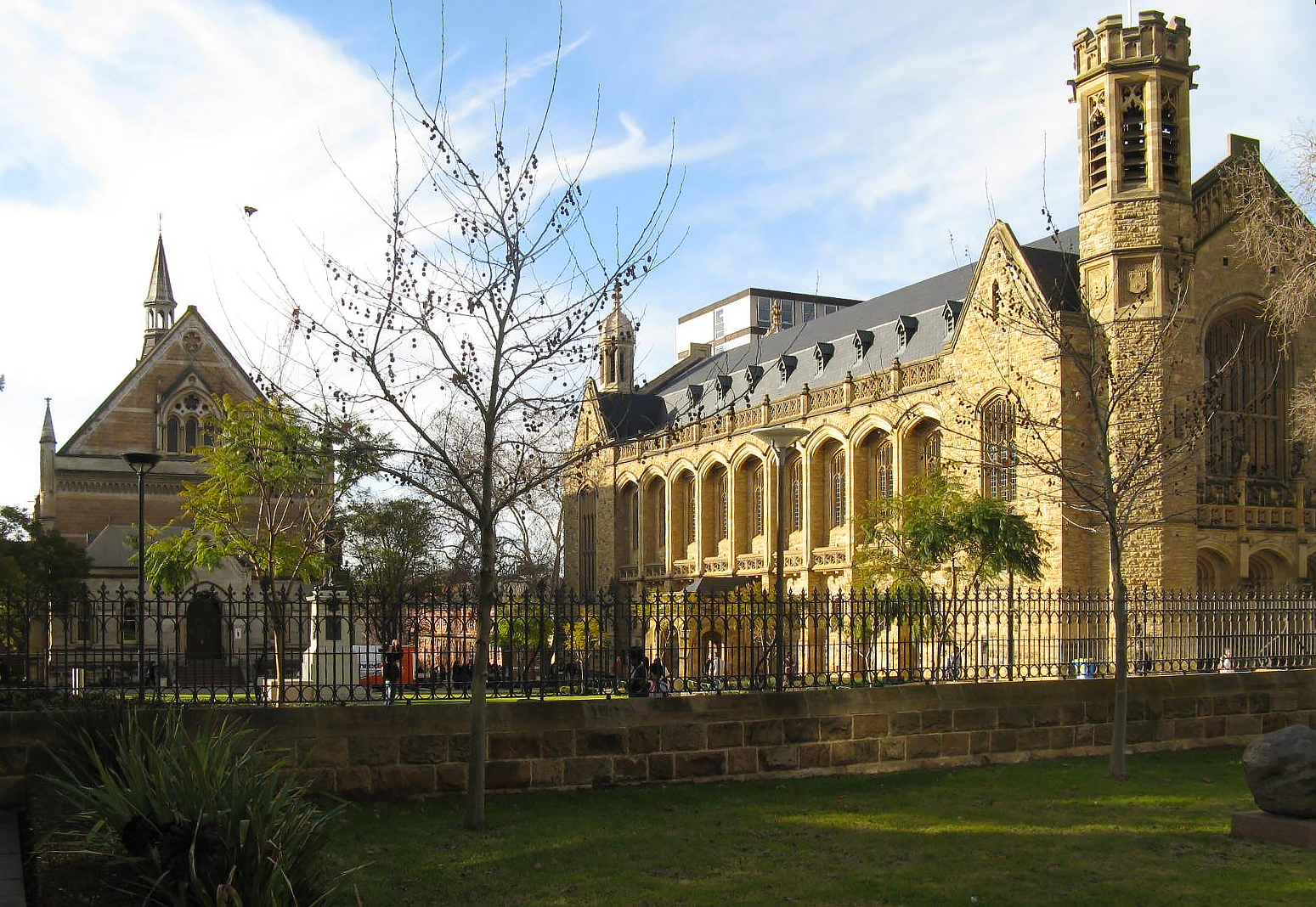
University of Adelaide, Bonython Hall & Conservatorium.

On her return to Australia, Knight took up academic positions first with the University of Adelaide and then with the University of South Australia's School of Education, holding both teach and research positions for over 20 years.

Her career focus has led to her involvement in writing South Australia's Senior Secondary Philosophy curriculum and she served as inaugural Chair of the Senior Secondary Assessment Board of South Australia's Philosophy Subject Advisory Committee.

Knight established and held the inaugural Chair of the South Australian Philosophy in Education Association, which is involved in primary and middle school education.

From 2006 to 2009 Knight held the joint editorship of Critical and Creative Thinking: The Australasian Journal of Philosophy in Education with Carol Collins.

Other contributions Knight has made to the field of philosophy for children include:

- Membership of the Vincent Fairfax Family Fund's Ethical Development Working Group.
- In 2009 Knight was a member of the Federation of Australasian Philosophy in Schools Associations (FAPSA) Working Party which was established to promote the inclusion of Philosophy in the National Curriculum.
- Speaker at the Young Minds Conference in Sydney in 2012.
- Knight addressed the 22nd meeting of the Presidential Commission for the Study of Bioethics in Washington in September 2015.
- In 2015 Knight gave The Ronald B Lippin Lecture in Ethics and the keynote address to the annual Rock Ethics Institute's Moral Literacy Colloquium at Pennsylvania State University. The title of the lecture was: After Lipman: A Developmental K-6 Ethics Curriculum.
- Knight was a panel member in the discussion on the societal role of secular ethics with the Dalai Lama at the Happiness and its Causes conference, June 2015.
- In 2018 Knight was invited to speak at Skepticon 2018, The Australian Skeptics National Convention.

=== New South Wales Ethics Course Trial ===
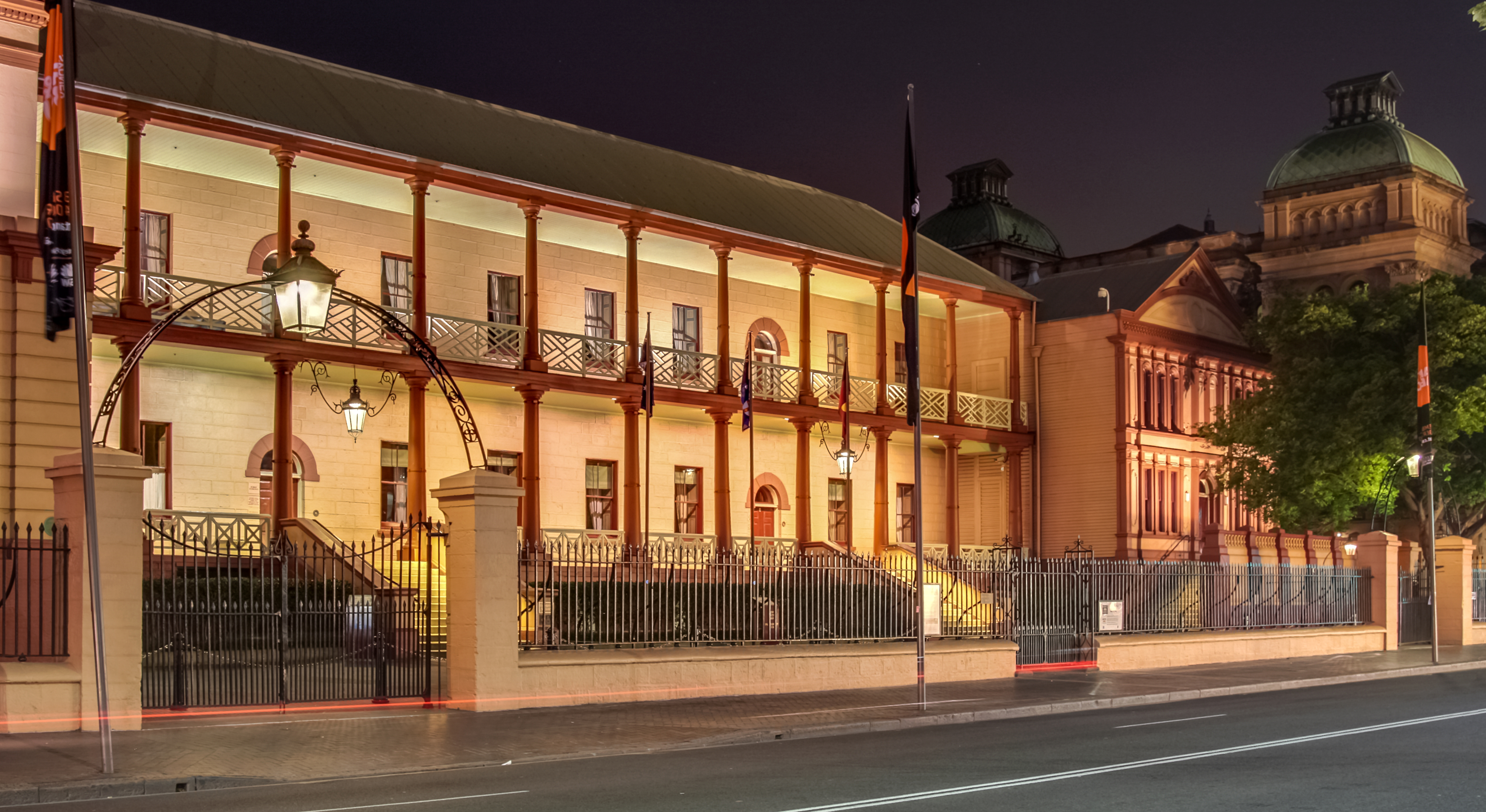
Parliament house, Sydney, NSW. Author: Adam.J.W.C.

In 2010 Knight was chief evaluator of the NSW Ethics Course Trial and published her final report in September 2010. In December 2010 New South Wales Parliament amended the New South Wales Education Act to give students who do not attend Special Religious Education (Scripture) classes in NSW public schools the legal right to attend philosophical ethics classes as an option to supervised "private study".

Knight resigned from the University of South Australia to become lead curriculum author for Primary Ethics Limited, an independent not-for-profit organisation, chosen to create the Ethics program to be delivered as the alternative to Special Religious Education (Scripture) in NSW Public schools. Both the trial and the introduction of ethics classes was not without controversy with objections and support coming from various church, secular, school and parent groups and interest from other states.
