= Sue Ainslie Clark =

American labor activist

- Ainslie, from the 1903 yearbook of Wellesley College
- Born: Susan Belle Ainslie; September 21, 1879; Brooklyn, New York, U.S.
- Died: April 8, 1965 (aged 85); Los Angeles, California, U.S.
- Occupations: Labor activist, writer, clubwoman

Susan "Sue" Belle Ainslie Clark (September 21, 1879 – April 8, 1965) was an American writer, clubwoman, and labor activist. She was president of the Boston Women's Trade Union League, and co-wrote a 1910 study of working women in New York.

== Early life and education ==
Ainslie was born in Brooklyn, the daughter of William Douglas Ainslie and Susan Arabella Dewey Ainslie. Her maternal grandfather Hiram Todd Dewey was a wine merchant. She graduated from Packer Collegiate Institute in 1899, in the same class as suffragist Lucy Burns, and from Wellesley College in 1903.

== Career ==
After college, Clark was Florence Kelley's assistant at the National Consumers League in New York. Clark and Edith Franklin Wyatt wrote Making Both Ends Meet (1911), a study of working women in New York City, based on interviews and financial records. The book was serialized in McClure's in 1910. "Its publication stimulated some of the earliest direct efforts in this country for wage legislation", according to Kelley. Clark was elected president of the Boston Women's Trade Union League in 1911. She spoke to a women's clubs in support of the minimum wage bill in 1912, and advertised three lectures about childrearing available for women's clubs in 1922.

Making both ends meet - the income and outlay of New York working girls (1911) by Clark and Wyatt

== Publications ==
- "Working Girls' Budgets" (1910, with Edith Franklin Wyatt)
- Making Both Ends Meet (1911, with Edith Franklin Wyatt)

== Personal life ==
Ainslie married newspaper editor Alfred S. Clark in 1909. They had four children. Her husband died in 1933, and she died in 1965, at the age of 85, in Los Angeles.
