= Sue Parham =

American businesswoman and consultant

Sue Parham (née Schoonover) is an American businesswoman and consultant. She is the owner of the woman-focused consulting firm Lessons Learned and the president of the board of the Women's Center for Leadership. She also co-founded The Compass Project with Sandra Lewis.

== Early life and education ==
Parham holds a bachelor's degree in speech communication and rhetoric from the University of Oregon.

== Career ==
Parham began working at Nike in 1991, where she was named division merchandising manager of the personal lifestyle and women's product categories. She remained with the company until 2000, during which time she worked as a general merchandise manager and was made the US director of merchandising apparel prior to her leaving. Parham has also worked with the Meriwether Group as a brand marketing and product consultant, as well as with Columbia Sportswear, where she was the VP Global Design and Merchandising, Apparel, Accessories and Equipment.

In 2000 Parham established Lessons Learned, a consulting firm that provides strategy, training, and presentation work to consumer product brands. She also created Hokey Pokey wrapping paper, wrapping pads intended to hang on the back of a door along with coordinating ribbons, bows, and gift tags.

=== Civic work ===
Parham is the current president of the board for the Women's Center for Leadership, which focuses on improving women's leadership skills, through available programming. In 2016 Parham co-founded the Compass Project with Sandra Lewis. The project's goal is to use the funds of products such as bracelets to help women get elected into public office.

== Personal life ==
She lives in Portland, Oregon. She is married to Ron Parham, and together they have four children.
