= Sioux Township =

Sioux Township may refer to:

- Sioux Township, Clay County, Iowa
- Sioux Township, Lyon County, Iowa
- Sioux Township, Monona County, Iowa
- Sioux Township, Plymouth County, Iowa
- Sioux Township, Sioux County, Iowa
- Sioux Township, Platte County, Missouri
- Sioux Township, McKenzie County, North Dakota

== See also ==
- Sioux (disambiguation)
