= Sue Meredith =

American politician (born 1946)

Member of the Missouri House of Representatives from the 71st district
- In office 2013 – January 9, 2019
- Succeeded by: LaDonna Appelbaum

Personal details
- Born: August 16, 1946 (age 79) St. Louis, Missouri
- Party: Democratic
- Spouse: Michael
- Children: 3
- Profession: Politician

Sue Meredith (born August 16, 1946, in St. Louis, Missouri) is an American politician who was a member of the Missouri House of Representatives from the 71st district for three terms from 2013 to 2019.
