= Sue Kreitzman =

American-British outsider artist, curator, cookbook author, and television chef

Sue Kreitzman is an American-British outsider artist, curator, cookbook author, and television chef.

== Biography ==
Kreitzman was born in Washington Heights, New York. She is married to Steve, a research director at the Howard Foundation. They have one son. She lives in East London and New York.

== Career ==
She was a fourth-grade teacher, chef, and food writer before becoming an artist. She worked in the Georgia public school system in the late 60s, during integration, and was the first white teacher in an all-black school. While on maternity leave with her son, Kreitzman began cooking, ultimately choosing to leave her teaching career and become a cook. She wrote 27 cooking books and food articles for major publications.

Kreitzman joined Britain’s Outsider Art scene when she was 58 years old, painting with nail polish and using abandoned scraps and items to create her art. She is a member of the Colour Tribe at Spitafields Market, a group of East London artists. Her own clothing is made from fabrics curated at flea markets and second-hand shops.

== Exhibits and public appearances ==
She showed at her first exhibit in 2005 at the Raw Arts Festival. at the Candid Arts Trust in Central London. In 2008, she curated and formed the Wild Old Woman (WOW) exhibit in Novas Gallery, bringing together 14 self-taught older female artists.

In 2012, she curated the Dare to Wear exhibit in the Crypt of St Pancras Church in London.

Kreitzman was featured in Fabulous Fashionistas and the Bright Old Things campaign for Selfridges, with an installation facing Regent’s Street and Oxford Street. In 2019, she showed her art at the Voices of East London store in Bicester Village in King’s Cross.
