= Sue Schmitz =

American politician

Member of the Alabama House of Representatives from the 6th district
- In office November 4, 1998 – February 24, 2009
- Succeeded by: Phil Williams

Personal details
- Party: Democratic

Sue Schmitz is an American politician who served in the Alabama House of Representatives from the 6th district from 1998 to 2009.
