= USS Sioux =

USS Sioux may refer to:

- USS Sioux (YT-19), an iron-hulled tugboat built as P. H. Wise at Philadelphia in 1892
- USS Sioux (ID-1766), a cargo ship built in 1916 by the American Shipbuilding Co., Cleveland, Ohio
- USS Sioux (AT-75), a Navajo-class fleet tug in service from World War II through the Vietnam War
- USNS Sioux (T-ATF-171), a Powhatan-class fleet ocean tug placed in service in 1981

== See also ==
- USS Sioux City
