= Sue Evison =

Geotechnical Engineer from New Zealand

Sue Elizabeth Evison P.Eng., FEC, FGC (Hon.)
- Born: Alexandra, New Zealand
- Education: University of Otago (B.Sc.); University of Canterbury (B.E.); University of Alberta (M.Sc.)
- Occupation: Geotechnical engineer

Sue Elizabeth Evison is a geotechnical engineer from New Zealand, who spent most of her career working in Canada. She was also the first woman to be president of the Association of Professional Engineers and Geoscientists of Alberta.

== Early life and education ==
Evison is the eldest of four siblings and was born in New Zealand where grew up in the small town of Alexandra on the South Island. Her grandmother was one of the first women in New Zealand to become a Physician, her uncle was a mountaineering engineer, father was a doctor and her mother a teacher.

Evison studied mathematics at the University of Otago and graduated in 1975. She then got a teaching certificate and briefly taught maths and physical education at a girls school. Despite the social attitudes towards women in engineering, and her earlier scepticism, however meeting engineers whilst skiing, and encouragement from her uncle, made her reconsider a career in engineering.

Evison then studied Civil Engineering at the University of Canterbury in 1978 where she was only one of three women in the cohort and she is one of the first five women to civil engineers in New Zealand. She later studied for a MSc in Geotechnical Engineering from the University of Alberta, graduating in 1988. She completed this degree whilst working as a researcher for Professor James Gordon MacGregor and raising a family.

== Career ==
Evison's first role was at Halliday, O’Laughlin and Taylor which she left to move to Canada, where she joined a precast concrete fabrication company in Edmonton called Batoni Structures. Over the course of her career she has also worked for consulting firms such as Thurber Engineering, AGRAEarth and Environmental, Jacques Whitford Associates, and Klohn Crippen Berger. She returned to New Zealand in 2003 and joined Beca Ltd.

Evison has been engaged in a number of different professional bodies in the field of geotechnical engineering. Such as the Canadian Geotechnical Society, the Calgary Geotechnical Society, the Association of Professional Engineers, Geologists and Geophysicists of Alberta, the Consulting Engineers of Alberta, the Tunnelling Association of Canada, the Canadian Dam Association, the North American Society of Trenchless Technology, and the Australian Institute of Mining and Metallurgy.

As a geotechnical engineering consultant, Evison has had a varied career, she has been part of the development of trenchless technology innovations, complex numerical analysis in a variety of applications, finite element simulation for soil-pipe interaction and marine foundations.

In 1982 Evison joined the Association of Professional Engineers and Geoscientists of Alberta and after many years as a member, she became the first woman to become president of the association in 2000.

In 2009 Evison became a Fellow of Engineers Canada and in 2013 she became an Honorary Fellows of Geoscience Canada.

== Family and personal life ==
Evison has two daughters, Tisha and Rhiannon.

Evison, an avid skier was a mountain tour guide at the Lake Louise Ski Resort and an assistant patrol leader for the Canadian Ski Patrol. Evison was also a member of the New Zealand junior golf team and a junior women's titleholder and continued to be a keen golfer.
