= Sue Greenleaf =

American novelist

Sue Greenleaf was an American novelist based in Fort Worth, Texas. Her 1901 novel Liquid from the Sun's Rays contained "elements of both science fiction and occultism".

== Works ==
- Liquid from the Sun's Rays, New York: Abbey Press, 1901. Republished as Don Miguel Lehumada, Discover of the Liquid from the Sun's Rays: An Occult Romance of Mexico and the United States, W. Dodge & Company, 1906.
- Wed by Mighty Waves: A Thrilling Romance of Ill-Fated Galveston, Chicago: Laird & Lee, 1901.
