= Sue Fennessy =

Australian-born American entrepreneur

Sue Fennessy now known as Zoe Kalar (born 25 July 1968) is an Australian-born American, business woman, philanthropist and entrepreneur. She is the founder and CEO of WeAre8, founder, largest shareholder, and former CEO of the Standard Media Index (SMI), the founder of Frontiers Group LTD, and a fellow at Monash University.

== Early life ==
Sue Fennessy was born in Melbourne, Australia and matriculated to Monash University in 1989. Fennessy later founded the Global Discovery program, leading their New York initiative.

== Career ==
In 1989, during the course of her university studies, Fennessy founded MM Communications, an international sponsorship business based in Asia Pacific. The company was acquired by Omnicom in 2000.

In 2001, Fennessy founded Frontiers Group, a technology-driven sports and entertainment company that structured and negotiated the 2002 World Cup TV/digital rights as well as spearheaded lifestyle television programming in China. She also negotiated for the first Western musicals, Cats and Les Miserables, to be staged in China.

In 2009, Fennessy founded and became CEO of Standard Media Index (SMI), leading the company until 2014. Operating out of in North America, APAC, and Europe, SMI is considered a global source of ad intelligence for media and finance companies including NBC, Disney, News Corporation, Google, Warner Media, CBS, UBS, Goldman Sachs, Deutsche Bank and Credit Suisse.

Fennessy is also the founder and CEO of social media app WeAre8. WeAre8 is a B-Corp. In November 2023, BBC Studios partnered with WeAre8, on a distribution deal for BBC Earth content.
