= Soo (Korean name) =

Soo (Korean: 수), also spelled Su, is a rare Korean surname and a Korean given name.

== Family name ==
As a family name, Soo may be written with two different hanja, each indicating different lineages. The 2000 South Korean Census found a total of 199 people and 54 households with these family names.

The more common name means 'water' (水; 물 수). The surviving bongwan (origin of a clan lineage, not necessarily the actual residence of the clan members) as of 2000 included Gangneung, Gangwon Province (46 people and 12 households); Gangnam, Seoul (41 people and 9 households); Gimhae, South Gyeongsang Province (17 people and four households); Gosan (today Wanju County), North Jeolla Province (11 people and three households); and nine people with other or unknown bongwan. According to the Joseon Ssijok Tongbo (조선씨족통보; 朝鮮氏族統譜), the name originated in Wuxing (today Wuxing District, Huzhou), Zhejiang, China.

The less common name means 'shore' or 'bank' (洙; 물가 수). For the 75 people with this family name, the surviving bongwan as of 2000 included Dalseong County, Daegu (46 people and 15 households); Miryang, South Gyeongsang Province (24 people and eight households); and five people with other or unknown bongwan.

== Given name ==
People with the given name Soo include:

- Go Soo (born 1978), South Korean actor

== See also ==
- List of Korean family names
- List of Korean given names
