= Sue Pearce =

Australian cricketer (born 1969)

Personal information
- Full name: Susan Pearce
- Born: 6 January 1969 (age 57)
- Batting: Right-handed
- Bowling: Right-arm off break

Domestic team information
- Years: Team
- 2004/05: Western Australia

Career statistics
| Competition | WLA |
|---|---|
| Matches | 2 |
| Runs scored | 19 |
| Batting average | 9.50 |
| 100s/50s | 0/0 |
| Top score | 15 |
| Catches/stumpings | 0/– |
- Source: CricketArchive, 3 July 2021

Susan Pearce (born 6 January 1969) is a former Australian cricketer. She played two List A matches for Western Australia during the 2004–05 season of the Women's National Cricket League (WNCL).
