= Sue Jones (computational biologist) =

Computational biologist

Susan Jones
- Education: University of York; University College London
- Occupation: Computational biologist
- Scientific career
- Thesis: G proteins transducing receptor-mediated inhibition of the M-type K('+) current in rat cultured sympathetic neurones (1995)

Susan Jones is a British computational biologist and bioinformatics group leader at the James Hutton Institute. Her work is specially focused on plant pathogen diagnostics, particularly virus diagnostics, using large datasets of RNA-Seq data. She also works on functional genomics, transcription regulation, protein-protein and protein-nucleic-acid interactions.^{,}

== Biography ==
=== Education ===
In 1990, she received her Bachelor of Science in Biology from the University of York.

In 1995, she earned her Doctor of Philosophy in Bioinformatics/ Biochemistry from University College London.

=== Career ===
She began her scientific career as a research fellow at University College London, Cancer Research UK and EMBL-EBI.

She went on to hold bioinformatics lecturer and bioinformatics senior lecturer positions at the University of Sussex.

From 2011 to 2020, Jones was a senior scientist in computational biology at the James Hutton Institute in Dundee, United Kingdom. Since 2020, she is the bioinformatics group leader there.

== Selected publications ==
Jones has over 60 publications. Some of them have been cited over 3000 times each.

- Jones, Susan; Thornton, Janet M. (12 September 1997). "Analysis of protein-protein interaction sites using surface patches". Journal of Molecular Biology. 272 (1): 121–132. doi:10.1006/jmbi.1997.1234. ISSN 0022-2836. PMID 9299342.
- Jones, Susan; Thornton, Janet M. (1 January 1995). "Protein-protein interactions: A review of protein dimer structures". Progress in Biophysics and Molecular Biology. 63 (1): 31–65. doi:10.1016/0079-6107(94)00008-W. ISSN 0079-6107. PMID 7746868.
- Jones, S.; Thornton, J. M. (9 January 1996). "Principles of protein-protein interactions". Proceedings of the National Academy of Sciences. 93 (1): 13–20. Bibcode:1996PNAS...93...13J. doi:10.1073/pnas.93.1.13. ISSN 0027-8424. PMC 40170. PMID 8552589.
