= Sue Karahalios =

American politician

Member of the Washington House of Representatives from the District 24 district
- In office 1993–1995

Personal details
- Born: March 8, 1949 (age 77) Rhode Island
- Party: Democratic
- Education: Louisiana State University; Western Washington University

Sue M. Compton Karahalios (born March 8, 1949) was an American politician. She was a Democrat, and representing District 24 in the Washington House of Representatives which included contains north and east of Puget Sound, including all of Island County and parts of Skagit and Snohomish counties, from 1993 to 1995. Karahalios graduated from Oak Harbor High School in 1967. She was an educator by profession.
