= John Driscoll (sailor) =

Irish sailor

Personal information
- Nationality: Irish
- Born: 3 January 1969 (age 56)

Sport
- Sport: Sailing

John Driscoll (born 3 January 1969) is an Irish sailor. He competed in the Finn event at the 1996 Summer Olympics.
