= W139 =

Coordinates: 52.3735°N 4.8956°E

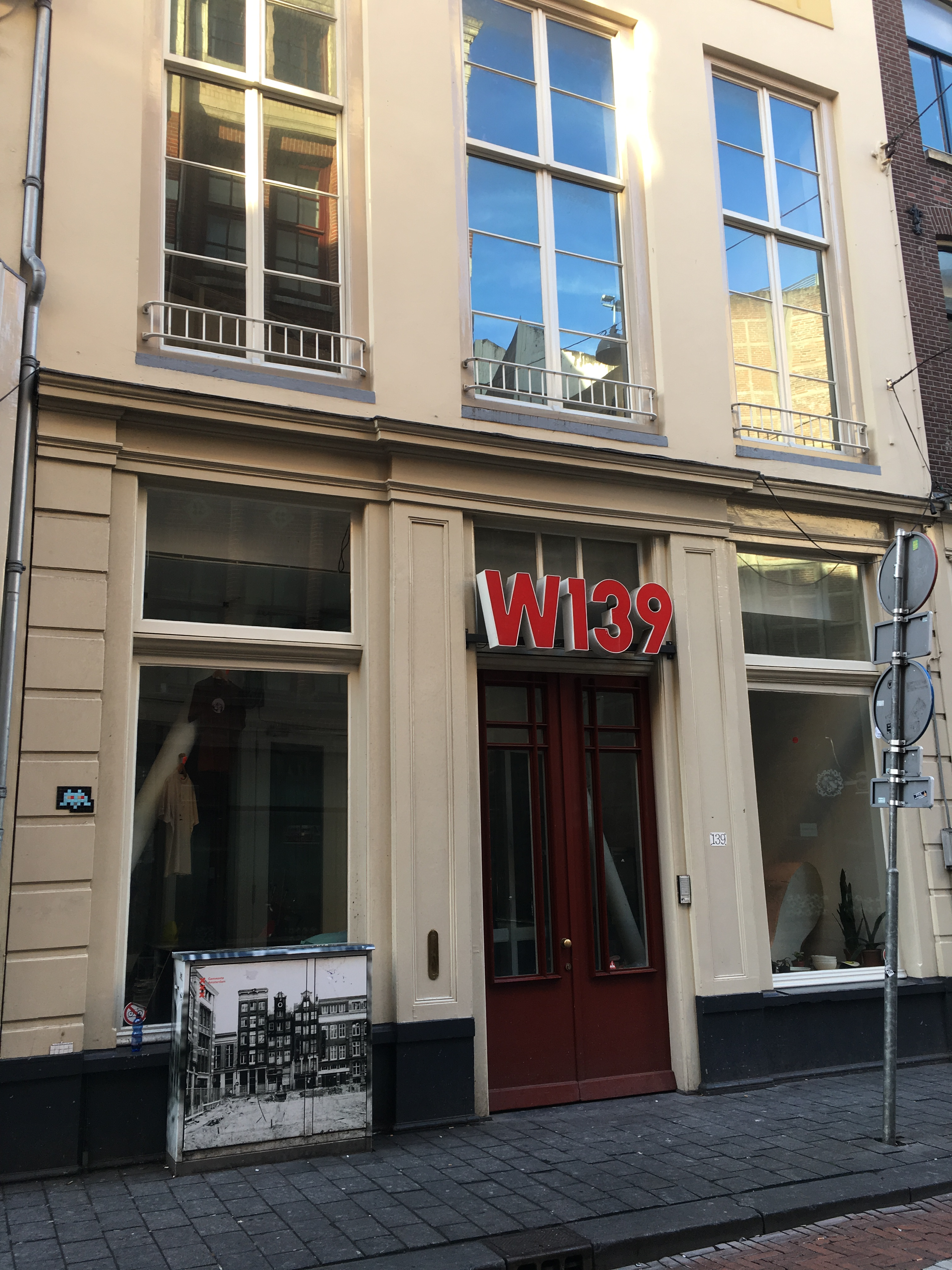
Entrance of W139, May 2019

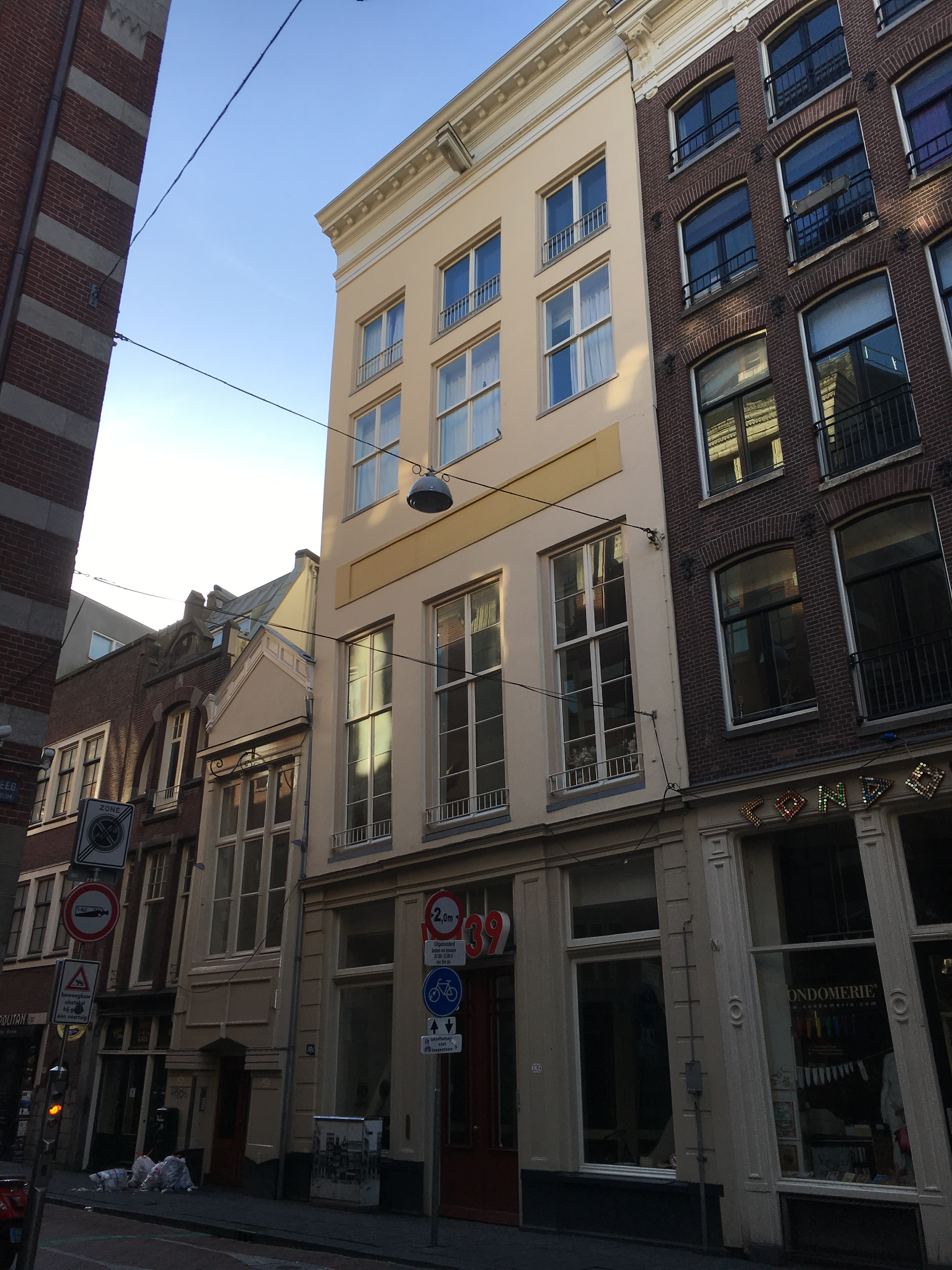
Exterior view of W139 building, May 2019

W139 is an artist-run space established in 1979 on the Warmoesstraat, Amsterdam, the Netherlands. The former theatre was squatted in October 1979 by five young artists as "a movement against the closed world of commercial art and museums". Currently a group of national and international artists are organising different contemporary art shows by following the W139 artist-run approach. In 2016 the expositions 'Gym of Absolute Technology', 'Shifting Spaces' and 'UU&ME' were held.
