= 1914 =

1914 in various calendars
- Gregorian calendar: 1914; MCMXIV
- Ab urbe condita: 2667
- Armenian calendar: 1363; ԹՎ ՌՅԿԳ
- Assyrian calendar: 6664
- Baháʼí calendar: 70–71
- Balinese saka calendar: 1835–1836
- Bengali calendar: 1320–1321
- Berber calendar: 2864
- British Regnal year: 4 Geo. 5 – 5 Geo. 5
- Buddhist calendar: 2458
- Burmese calendar: 1276
- Byzantine calendar: 7422–7423
- Chinese calendar: 癸丑年 (Water Ox); 4611 or 4404 — to — 甲寅年 (Wood Tiger); 4612 or 4405
- Coptic calendar: 1630–1631
- Discordian calendar: 3080
- Ethiopian calendar: 1906–1907
- Hebrew calendar: 5674–5675
- Hindu calendars
- Vikram Samvat: 1970–1971
- Shaka Samvat: 1835–1836
- Kali Yuga: 5014–5015
- Holocene calendar: 11914
- Igbo calendar: 914–915
- Iranian calendar: 1292–1293
- Islamic calendar: 1332–1333
- Japanese calendar: Taishō 3 (大正３年)
- Javanese calendar: 1843–1845
- Juche calendar: 3
- Julian calendar: Gregorian minus 13 days
- Korean calendar: 4247
- Minguo calendar: ROC 3 民國3年
- Nanakshahi calendar: 446
- Thai solar calendar: 2456–2457
- Tibetan calendar: ཆུ་མོ་གླང་ལོ་ (female Water-Ox); 2040 or 1659 or 887 — to — ཤིང་ཕོ་སྟག་ལོ་ (male Wood-Tiger); 2041 or 1660 or 888

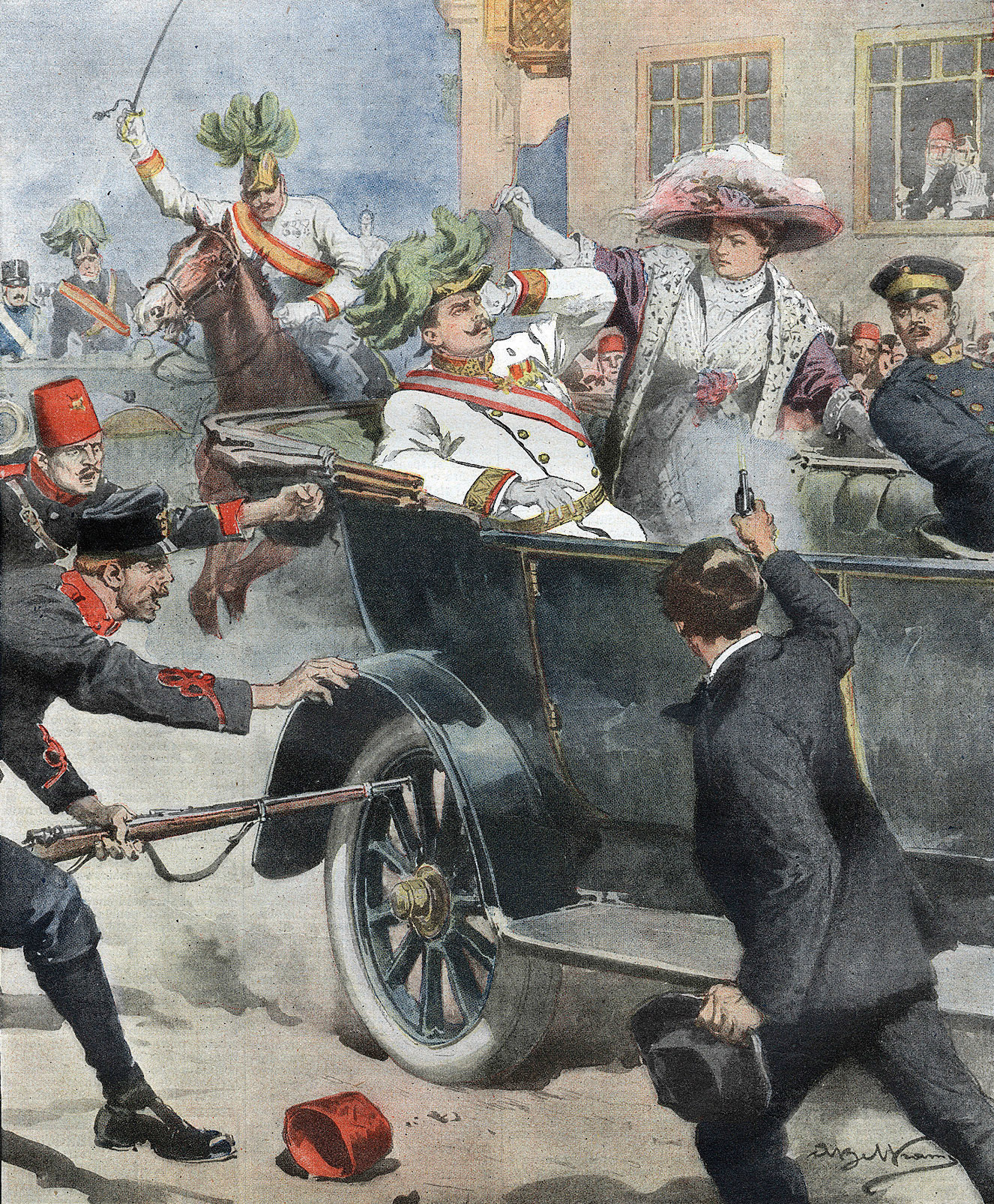
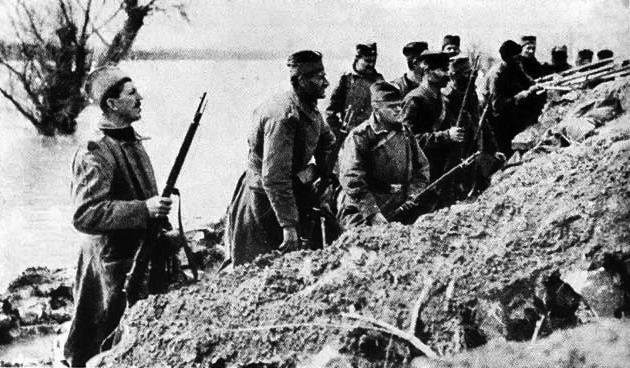
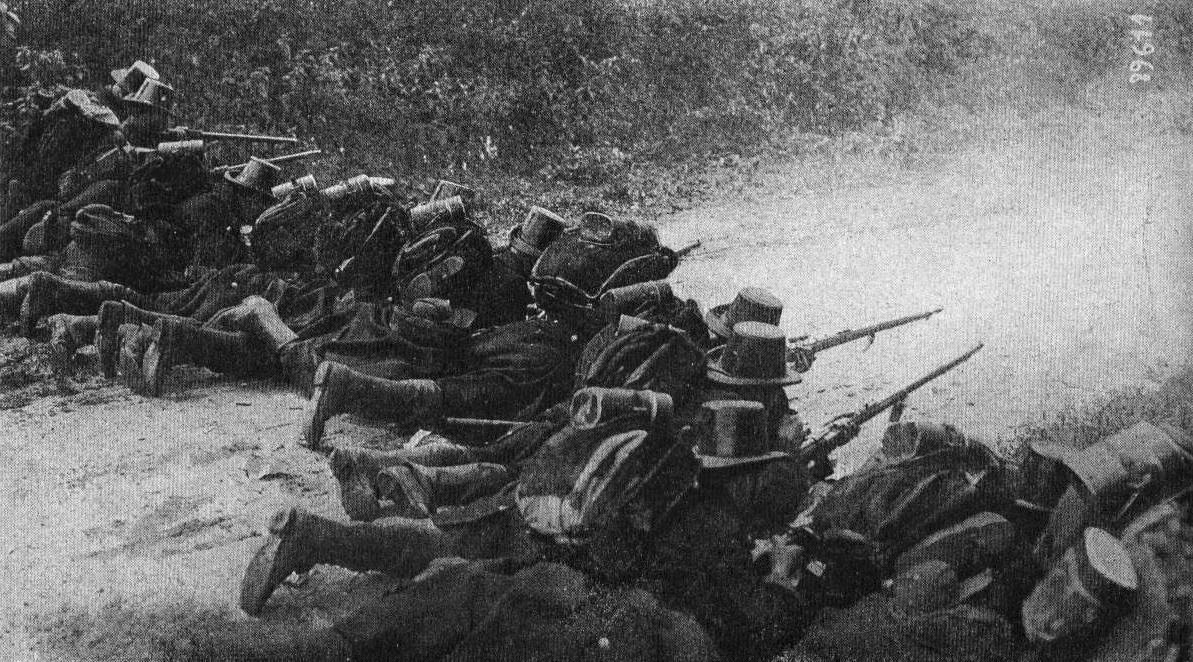
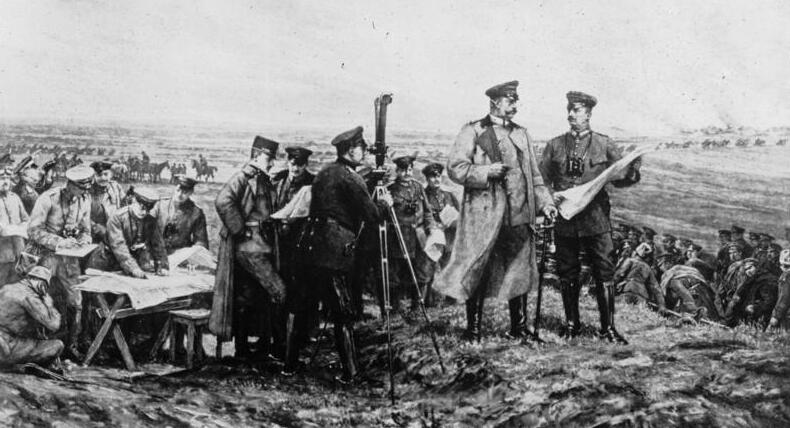
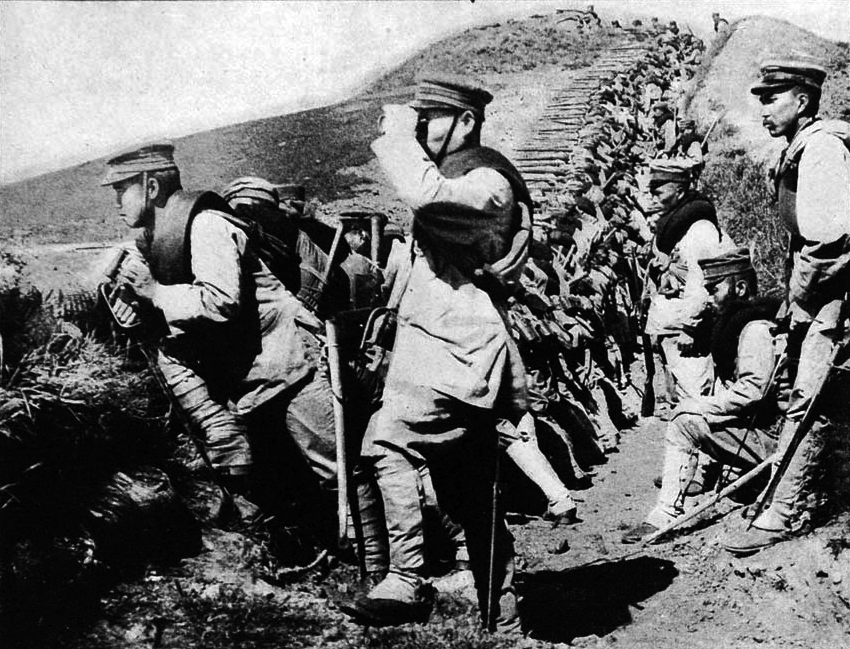
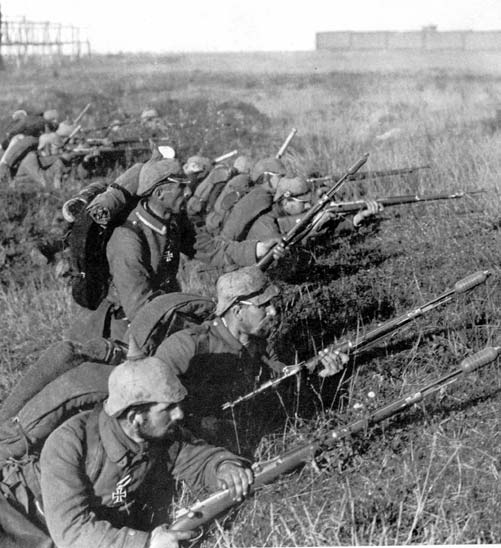
From top to bottom, left to right:
- The assassination of Archduke Franz Ferdinand and his wife Sophie, Duchess of Hohenberg in Sarajevo by Gavrilo Princip triggers the July Crisis, leading to the outbreak of World War I;
- The Serbian campaign begins as Austria-Hungary invades Serbia, facing fierce resistance;
- The Battle of Liège sees German forces delayed by Belgian defenders, disrupting the Schlieffen Plan;
- The Battle of Tannenberg results in a decisive German victory over the Russian Second Army on the Eastern Front;
- The Siege of Tsingtao marks Japan’s entry into the war as Allied forces capture the German port in China;
- The First Battle of the Marne halts the German advance into France, beginning the prolonged stalemate of trench warfare on the Western Front.

1914 (MCMXIV) was a common year starting on Thursday of the Gregorian calendar and a common year starting on Wednesday of the Julian calendar, the 1914th year of the Common Era (CE) and Anno Domini (AD) designations, the 914th year of the 2nd millennium, the 14th year of the 20th century, and the 5th year of the 1910s decade. As of the start of 1914, the Gregorian calendar was 13 days ahead of the Julian calendar, which remained in localized use until 1923.

This year saw the beginning of what became known as the First World War, after Archduke Franz Ferdinand of Austria, heir to the Austrian throne was assassinated by Serbian nationalist Gavrilo Princip. It also saw the first airline to provide scheduled regular commercial passenger services with heavier-than-air aircraft, with the St. Petersburg–Tampa Airboat Line.

== Events ==
=== January ===
- January 1 – The St. Petersburg–Tampa Airboat Line in the United States starts services between St. Petersburg and Tampa, Florida, becoming the first airline to provide scheduled regular commercial passenger services with heavier-than-air aircraft.
- January 11
  - The Sakurajima volcano in Japan begins to erupt, becoming effusive after a large earthquake on January 13. The lava flow causes the island which it forms to be linked to the Ōsumi Peninsula.
  - The Karluk, flagship of the Canadian Arctic Expedition, sinks after being crushed by ice.
- January 29 – Tsar Nicholas II of Russia dismisses his 4th Prime Minister, Vladimir Kokovtsov due to his "lack of control over the press", he is succeeded by Ivan Goremykin for his second term

=== February ===
- February 12 – In Washington, D.C., the first stone of the Lincoln Memorial is put into place.
- February 17 – Karl Staaff steps down as Prime Minister of Sweden in the aftermath of the Courtyard Crisis. He is replaced by Hjalmar Hammarskjöld, father of Dag Hammarskjöld.
- February 26 – The ocean liner that will become HMHS Britannic, sister to the RMS Titanic, is launched at the Harland and Wolff shipyards in Belfast.
- February 28 – The Autonomous Republic of Northern Epirus is proclaimed by ethnic Greeks.

=== March ===
- March 7 – Prince William of Wied arrives in Albania, to begin his reign.
- March 10 – Suffragette Mary Richardson damages Velázquez's painting Rokeby Venus in London's National Gallery, with a meat chopper.
- March 27 – Belgian surgeon Albert Hustin makes the first successful non-direct blood transfusion, using anticoagulants.
- March 29 – Katherine Routledge and her husband arrive on Easter Island, to make the first true study of it (they depart in August 1915).

=== April ===
- April 4–September 27 – Komagata Maru incident: The SS Komagata Maru sails from India to Canada. Canadian regulations, designed to exclude Asian immigrants, prevent the boat from docking in Vancouver, and it is forced to return to Calcutta with all its passengers.
- April 14–18 – The first International Criminal Police Congress is held in Monaco; 24 countries are represented, including some from Asia, Europe, and the Americas; the Dean of the Paris Law School is president.
- April 20
  - Colorado Coalfield War: Ludlow Massacre – The Colorado National Guard attacks a tent colony of 1,200 striking coal miners in Ludlow, Colorado, killing 21 people.
  - President Woodrow Wilson asks the United States Congress to use military force in Mexico, in reaction to the Tampico Affair.
- April 21 – United States occupation of Veracruz: 2,300 U.S. Navy sailors and Marines from the South Atlantic fleet land in the port city of Veracruz, Mexico, which they will occupy for over six months. The Ypiranga incident occurs when they attempt to enforce an arms embargo against Mexico by preventing the German cargo steamer SS Ypiranga from unloading arms for the Mexican government in the port.
- April 23
  - The Afrikaans language receives official recognition, when Cornelis Jacobus Langenhoven addresses the English caucus of the Cape Provincial Council.
  - MLB Chicago Federals host the Kansas City Packers in the first baseball game played at Weeghman Park (the later Wrigley Field).
- April 24–25 – Larne Gun Running: 35,000 rifles and over 3 million rounds of ammunition from a German dealer are landed at Larne, Bangor and Donaghadee in Ulster for the Unionist Ulster Volunteers.

=== May ===
- May 1–November 1 – The Exposition Internationale is held at Lyon, France.
- May 5–October 11 – The Jubilee Exhibition (Jubilæumsutstillingen) is held at Kristiania, Norway, to mark the centennial of the country's constitution.
- May 9 – J. T. Hearne in England becomes the first bowler to take 3,000 first-class wickets.
- May 17 – The Protocol of Corfu provides for the provinces of Korçë and Gjirokastër, constituting Northern Epirus, to be granted autonomy under the nominal sovereignty of Albania.
- May 25 – The House of Commons of the United Kingdom passes the Government of Ireland Act 1914, the "Irish Home Rule Bill".
- May 29 – Ocean liner RMS Empress of Ireland sinks in the Gulf of St. Lawrence following a collision; 1,012 lives are lost.
- May 30 – Ocean liner RMS Aquitania makes her maiden voyage.

=== June ===
- June 1 – Woodrow Wilson's envoy, Edward Mandell House, meets Kaiser Wilhelm II.
- June 8 – The Brazilian Football Confederation is founded, with Álvaro Zamith as its first president. The Brazilian Olympic Committee is founded on the same day.
- June 9 – Pittsburgh Pirate Honus Wagner becomes the first baseball player in the twentieth century with 3,000 career hits.
- June 12–18 – Greek genocide: Ottoman Greeks in Phocaea are massacred by Turkish irregular troops.
- June 18 – Mexican Revolution: The Constitutionalists take San Luis Potosí; Venustiano Carranza demands Victoriano Huerta's surrender.
- June 23 – After it had been closed so that it could be deepened, the Kaiser-Wilhelm-Kanal is reopened by the Kaiser; the British Fleet under Sir George Warrender visits; the Kaiser inspects the Dreadnought HMS King George V.

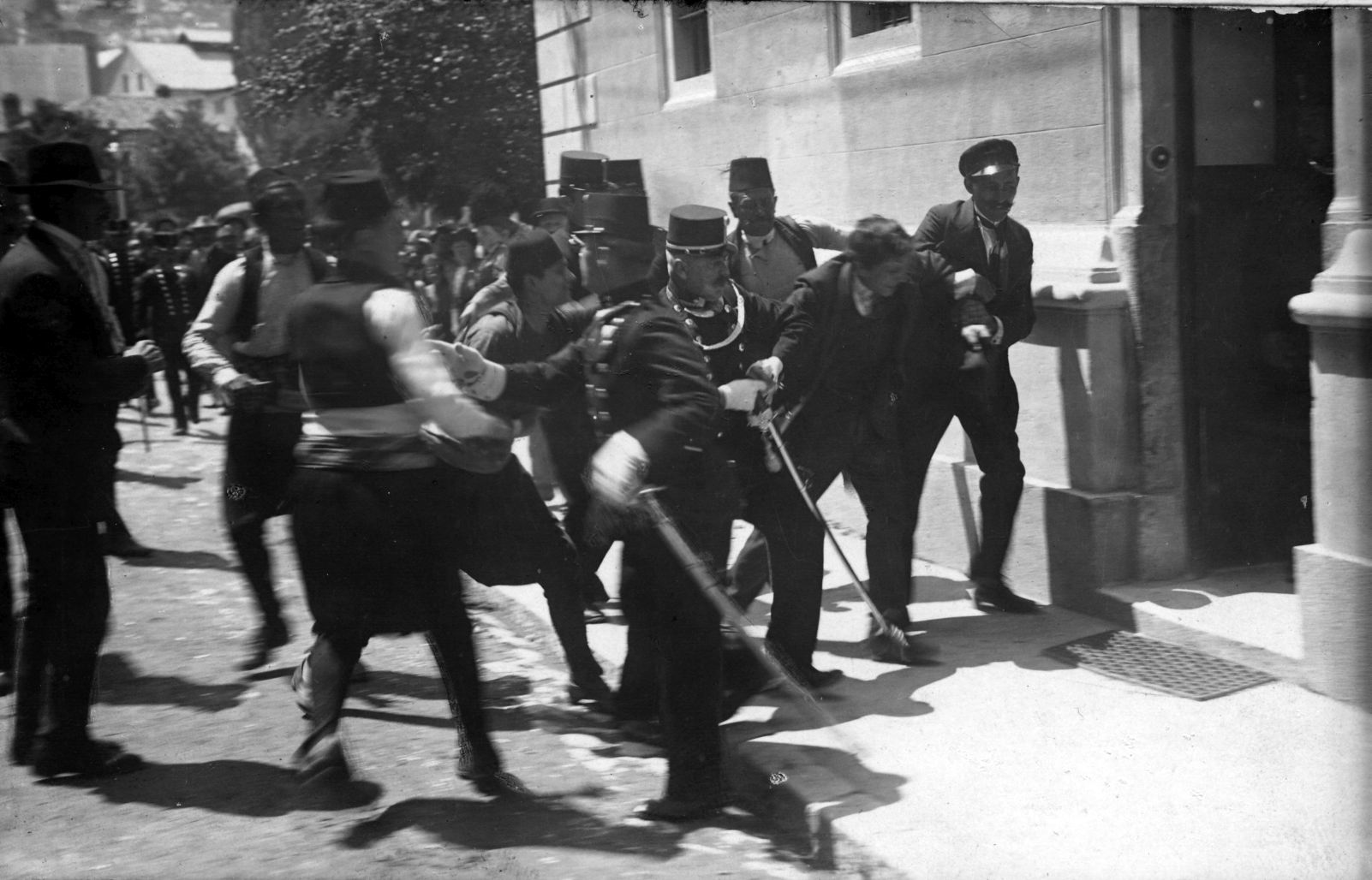
Arrest of a Suspect in Sarajevo: This picture was associated with the arrest of Gavrilo Princip, but modern research identifies it as depicting Ferdinand Behr, a bystander, in the confusion following the assassination of Archduke Franz Ferdinand.

- June 28 – Assassination of Archduke Franz Ferdinand of Austria: Serbian nationalist Gavrilo Princip, 19, assassinates Archduke Franz Ferdinand of Austria and his wife, Duchess Sophie, in Sarajevo, Bosnia and Herzegovina, triggering the July Crisis overnight and eventually World War I. Anti-Serb riots in Sarajevo and Zagreb break out.
- June 29
  - The Secretary of the Austro-Hungarian Legation at Belgrade sends a dispatch to Vienna, suggesting Serbian complicity in the crime of Sarajevo. Anti-Serb riots continue throughout Bosnia.
  - Khioniya Guseva attempts and fails to assassinate Grigori Rasputin at his hometown in Siberia.
  - The International Exhibition opens at the "White City", Ashton Gate, Bristol. It closes on August 15, and the site is used as a military depot.

=== July ===
- July 1 – The Royal Naval Air Service, a forerunner of the Royal Air Force, is established in the United Kingdom.
- July 2 – The German Kaiser announces that he will not attend the funeral of Archduke Franz Ferdinand.
- July 4
  - The funeral of Archduke Franz Ferdinand of Austria takes place at Artstetten Castle, 50 miles west of Vienna.
  - Lexington Avenue bombing: Four people are killed in New York City when an anarchist bomb intended to kill John D. Rockefeller explodes prematurely, in the conspirator's apartment.
- July 5 – A council is held at Potsdam: leaders within Austria-Hungary and Germany meet to discuss the possibilities of war with Serbia, Russia and France.
- July 7 – Austria-Hungary convenes a Council of Ministers, including Ministers for Foreign Affairs and War, the Chief of the General Staff, and Naval Commander-in-Chief; the Council lasts from 11:30 am until 6:15 pm.
- July 9 – The Emperor of Austria-Hungary receives the report of the Austro-Hungarian investigation into the assassination of Archduke Franz Ferdinand of Austria at Sarajevo. The Times of London publishes an account of the Austro-Hungarian press campaign against the Serbians (who are described as "pestilent rats").
- July 10 – Nicholas Hartwig, Russian Minister to Serbia, dies of a heart attack while visiting Austrian minister Wladimir Giesl von Gieslingen at the Austrian Legation in Belgrade.
- July 11
  - Baseball legend Babe Ruth makes his major league debut, with the Boston Red Sox.
  - USS Nevada, the United States Navy's first "super-dreadnought" battleship, is launched.
- July 13 – Reports surface of a projected Serbian attack upon the Austro-Hungarian Legation at Belgrade.
- July 13 – Felix Ysagun Manalo registers the Iglesia ni Cristo (Church of Christ) as Iglesia ni Kristo with the government of the Philippines.
- July 14 – The Government of Ireland Bill completes its passage through the House of Lords in the U.K. It allows Ulster counties to vote on whether or not they wish to participate in Home Rule from Dublin. Because of the outbreak of war in Europe and later developments in Ireland, the Act is never implemented in its original form.
- July 15 – Mexican Revolution: Victoriano Huerta resigns from the presidency of Mexico.
- July 18
  - The Signal Corps of the United States Army establishes an Aviation Section, giving definite status to its air service for the first time.
  - Mahatma Gandhi leaves South Africa for the last time, sailing out of Cape Town for England, on board the S.S. Kinfauns Castle.
- July 19 – George V summons a conference to discuss the Irish Home Rule problem. It meets from July 21–24, without reaching consensus.
- July 23 – July Ultimatum: Austria-Hungary presents Serbia with an unconditional ultimatum.
- July 25 – Serbia responds to the ultimatum from the 23rd accepting some but not all of Austria-Hungary's demands. In response Austria-Hungary severs diplomatic ties with Serbia and begins to mobilise its own forces. Radomir Putnik, Chief of the Serbian General Staff, is arrested in Budapest, but subsequently allowed to return to Serbia.
- July 26 – Howth gun-running: former British civil servant and novelist Erskine Childers and his wife Molly sail into Howth in Ireland and land 2,500 guns for the nationalist Irish Volunteers from a German dealer. British Army troops of the King's Own Scottish Borderers, returning to Dublin having been called out to assist police in attempting to prevent the Volunteers from moving the arms to the city, perpetrate the Bachelor's Walk massacre, firing on a crowd of protestors at Bachelors Walk, killing three; a fourth man dies later from bayonet wounds and more than 37 others are injured.

Map of European alliances in 1914 Triple Entente Triple Alliance

- July 28 – The official start of World War I when Austria-Hungary declares war on Serbia by telegram. Tsar Nicholas II of Russia orders a partial mobilisation against Austria-Hungary.
- July 28–August 10 – World War I: Pursuit of Goeben and Breslau: British and French naval forces fail to prevent the ships of the Imperial German Navy Mediterranean Division from reaching the Dardanelles.
- July 29 – World War I: Austro-Hungarian Navy river monitor SMS Bodrog fires the first shots of the war, opening the bombardment of the defenses of Belgrade, Serbia's capital.
- July 31 – Russia orders full mobilisation.

=== August ===
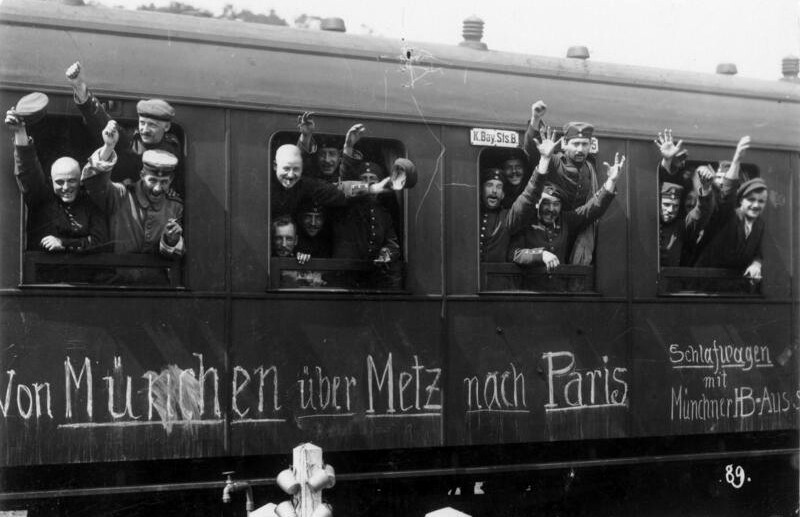
Mobilisation in Germany

- August 1
  - The German Empire declares war on the Russian Empire, following Russia's military mobilisation in support of Serbia; Germany also begins mobilisation.
  - France orders general mobilisation.
  - The New York Stock Exchange is closed because of the outbreak of the war in Europe, where nearly all stock exchanges are already closed.
  - Marcus Garvey founds the Universal Negro Improvement Association in Jamaica.
- August 2
  - German troops occupy Luxembourg, in accordance with the Schlieffen Plan.
  - A secret treaty between the Ottoman Empire and German Empires secures Ottoman neutrality.
  - At 19:00 (local time) Germany issues a 12-hour ultimatum to neutral Belgium, to allow German passage into France.
- August 3
  - Germany declares war on Russia's ally, France.
  - At 07:00 (local time) Belgium declines to accept Germany's ultimatum of August 2.
- August 4
  - World War I: German invasion of Belgium – At 08:02 (local time) Imperial German Army troops enter Belgium, bringing the July Crisis to a climax. At 23:00 (GMT) the British entry into World War I takes place when King George V in London declares war on Germany for this violation of Belgian neutrality (protected by the Treaty of London (1839)) and especially to defend France. This means a declaration of war by the whole British Empire against the German Empire. The United States declares neutrality.
  - World War I: Imperial German Navy Rear-Admiral Wilhelm Souchon bombards the French Algerian ports of Bône and Philippeville from battlecruiser Goeben and light cruiser Breslau.
  - Ittihad Alexandria sports club is founded in Alexandria, Egypt.
- August 5
  - Germany declares war on Belgium.
  - The Kingdom of Montenegro declares war on Austria-Hungary.
  - The guns of Point Nepean fort at Port Phillip Heads in Victoria (Australia) fire across the bows of the Norddeutscher Lloyd steamer SS Pfalz, which is attempting to leave the Port of Melbourne in ignorance of the declaration of war, and she is detained; this is said to be the first Allied shot of the war.
  - SS Königin Luise, taken over two days earlier by the Imperial German Navy as a minelayer, lays mines 40 miles (64 km) off the east coast of England. She is intercepted and sunk by the British Royal Navy light cruiser HMS Amphion, the first German naval loss of the war. The following day, Amphion strikes mines laid by the Königin Luise and is sunk with some loss of life, in the first British casualties of the war.
  - German zeppelins drop bombs on Liège, Belgium, killing 9 civilians.
  - The first electric traffic light is installed between Euclid Avenue and East 105 Street, in Cleveland, Ohio.
- August 5–16 – Battle of Liège: The German Army overruns and defeats the Belgians with the first operational use of Big Bertha.
- August 6 – World War I:
  - Austria-Hungary declares war on Russia.
  - The first engagement between capital ships (light cruisers) of the British Royal Navy and the Imperial German Navy occurs, when HMS Bristol pursues the SMS Karlsruhe (which escapes) in the West Indies.
- August 7 – World War I:
  - Battle of Mulhouse: France launches its first attack of the war, in an ultimately unsuccessful attempt to recover the province of Alsace from Germany, beginning the Battle of the Frontiers.
  - British colonial troops of the British Gold Coast Regiment, entering the German West African colony of Togoland, encounter the German-led police force at a factory in Nuatja, near Lomé, and the police open fire on the patrol. Alhaji Grunshi returns fire, the first soldier in British service to fire a shot in the war.
- August 8
  - German colonial forces execute Martin-Paul Samba, for high treason.
  - Sir Ernest Shackleton's Imperial Trans-Antarctic Expedition sets sail on the Endurance from Britain, in an attempt to cross Antarctica.
- August 9 – World War I: British Royal Navy light cruiser HMS Birmingham rams and sinks German submarine U-15 off Fair Isle, the first U-boat lost in action.
- August 12 – World War I:
  - Battle of Halen: Belgian troops defeat German cavalry, but the battle does little to delay the German invasion of Belgium.
  - Formal declaration of war by the United Kingdom on Austria-Hungary.
- August 13 – The Teoloyucan Treaties are signed in the State of Mexico.
- August 15
  - The Panama Canal is inaugurated with the passage of the SS Ancon.
  - Mexican Revolution: Venustiano Carranza's troops under general Álvaro Obregón enter Mexico City.
- August 15–24 – World War I: Battle of Cer – Serbian troops defeat the Austro-Hungarian army, marking the first Entente victory of the War.
- August 16 – World War I:
  - German warships SMS Goeben and Breslau (both commissioned in 1912), which reached Constantinople on August 10, are transferred to the Ottoman Navy, Goeben becoming its flagship, Yavuz Sultan Selim.
  - Lake Nyasa is the scene of a brief naval battle, when Captain Edmund Rhoades, commander of the British steamship SS Gwendolen, hears that war has broken out, and he receives orders from the British high command to "sink, burn, or destroy" the German Empire's only ship on the lake, the Hermann von Wissmann, commanded by a Captain Berndt. Rhoades's crew finds the Hermann von Wissmann in a bay near "Sphinxhaven", in German East African territorial waters. Gwendolen disables the German vessel with a single cannon shot from a range of about 1,800 meters (2,000 yards). This very brief engagement is hailed by The Times in London as the British Empire's first naval victory of World War I.
- August 17–September 2 – World War I: The Battle of Tannenberg begins between German and Russian forces.
- August 20
  - World War I: German forces occupy Brussels.
  - Pope Pius X dies.
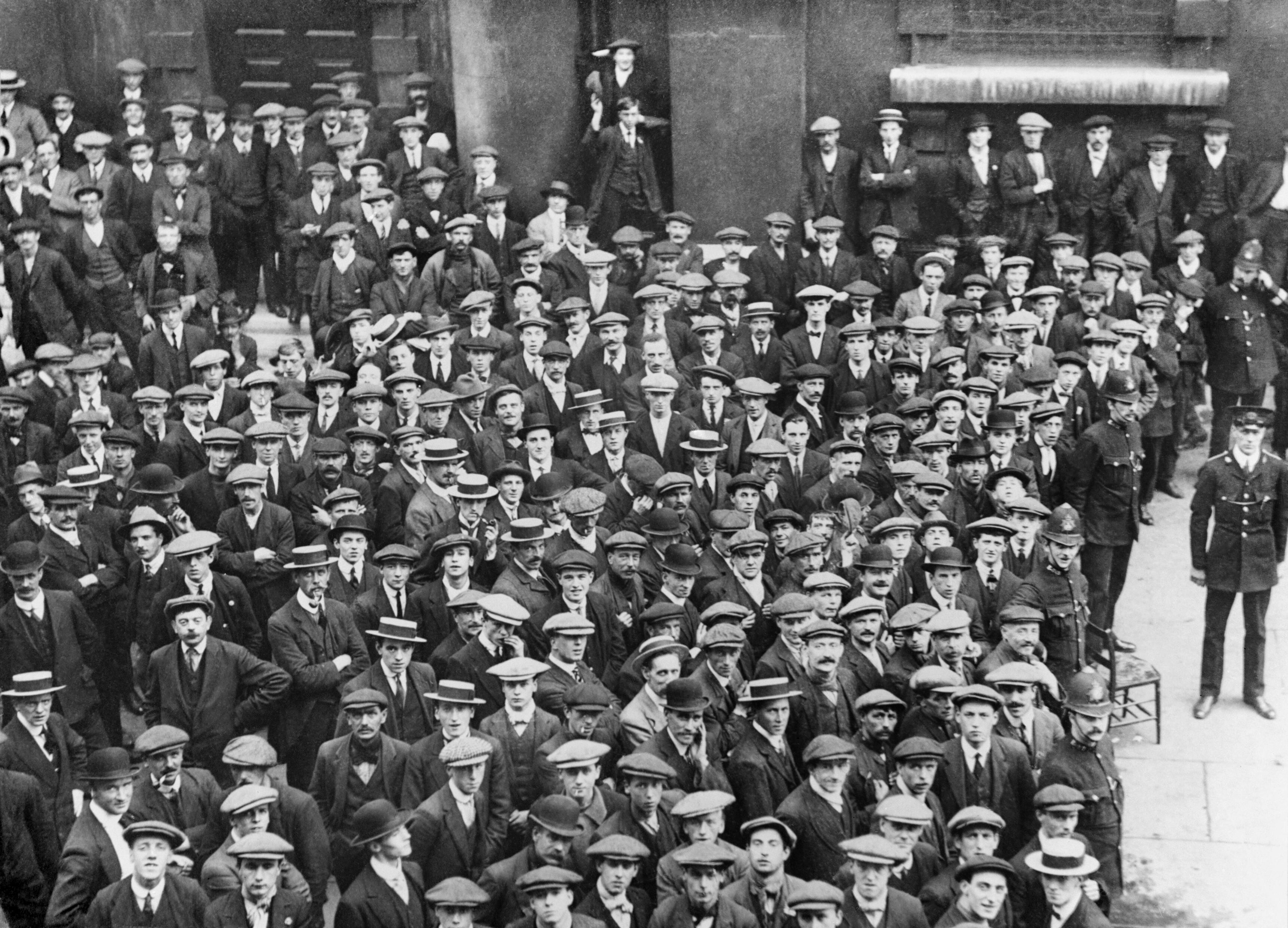
    British volunteer recruits in London
- August 22 – World War I: Battle of Rossignol – German forces decisively defeat the French.
- August 23 – World War I:
  - Battle of Mons: In its first major action, the British Expeditionary Force holds the German forces but then begins a month-long fighting Great Retreat to the Marne.
  - Japan declares war on Germany.
- August 26 – World War I:
  - The Togoland Campaign ends with the German West African colony of Togoland (Togo from 1960) surrendering to Britain and France.
  - Battle of Río de Oro: British Royal Navy protected cruiser HMS Highflyer forces the SS Kaiser Wilhelm der Grosse, sailing as an auxiliary cruiser, to scuttle off northwest Africa.
- August 26–27 – Battle of Le Cateau: British, French, and Belgian forces make a successful tactical retreat from the German advance.
- August 26–30 – Battle of Tannenberg: The Russian Second Army is surrounded and defeated.
- August 28 – Battle of Heligoland Bight: British cruisers under Admiral Beatty sink three German cruisers.
- August 29–30 – The Battle of St. Quentin: French forces hold back the German advance.

=== September ===
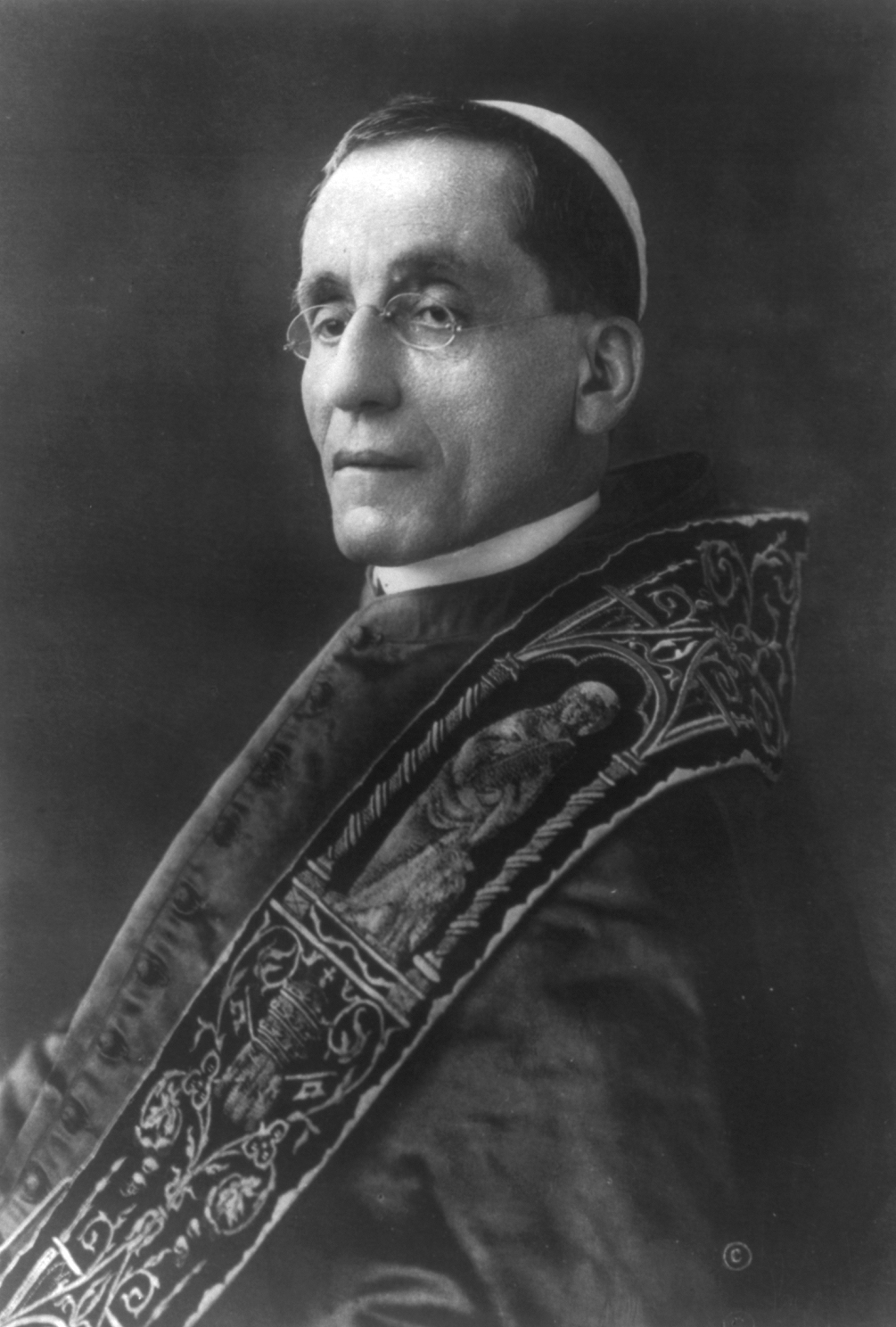
Pope Benedict XV, the new pope

- September 1 – The last known passenger pigeon, a female named Martha, dies in the Cincinnati Zoo from old age.
- September 2 – World War I: The French village of Moronvilliers is occupied by the Germans.
- September 3 – World War I:
  - The Austro-Hungarian city and fortress of Lemberg falls to Russian troops.
  - Pope Benedict XV (Giacomo della Chiesa) succeeds Pope Pius X.
  - William, Prince of Albania leaves the country after just six months, due to opposition to his rule.
- September 5 – World War I:
  - London Agreement: No member of the Triple Entente (Britain, France, or Russia) may seek a separate peace with the Central Powers.
  - The First Battle of the Marne begins: Situated north-east of Paris, the French 6th Army under General Maunoury attacks German forces near Paris. Over 2,000,000 fight (500,000 are killed/wounded) in the Allied victory. A French and British counterattack at the Marne ends the German advance on Paris.
  - British Royal Navy scout cruiser HMS Pathfinder is sunk by German submarine U-21 in the Firth of Forth (Scotland), the first ship ever to be sunk by a locomotive torpedo fired from a submarine.
- September 7 – World War I: Turkey declares war on Belgium.
- September 10 – World War I: South Africa declares war on Germany.
- September 11 – World War I:
  - The Battle of Rawa ends in the defeat of Austro-Hungarian forces by the Russians.
  - First Battle of the Masurian Lakes: A German offensive pushes the Russian First Army back across its entire front.
  - Battle of Bita Paka: The Australian Naval and Military Expeditionary Force lands on German New Guinea and secures a strategically significant wireless station, the first major Australian military engagement of the War.
- September 13 – World War I:
  - The conclusion of the Battle of Grand Couronné ends the Battle of the Frontiers, with the north-east segment of the Western Front stabilising.
  - South African troops open hostilities in German South-West Africa (modern-day Namibia), with an assault on the Ramansdrift police station.
- September 15 – The Maritz Rebellion of disaffected Boers against the government of the Union of South Africa begins. General Koos de la Rey, a Boer general associated with the leaders of the rebellion, is shot dead after his driver fails to stop at a police roadblock.
- September 17 – World War I: The Race to the Sea, by opposing forces on the Western Front, begins.
- September 21 – World War I: British Imperial police forces capture Schuckmannsburg, in the Caprivi Strip of German South-West Africa.
- September 22 – World War I:
  - Action of 22 September 1914: German submarine U-9 torpedoes three British Royal Navy armoured cruisers, HMS Aboukir, Cressy and Hogue, with the death of more than 1,400 men, in the North Sea.
  - Bombardment of Papeete: German naval forces bombard Papeete, French Polynesia.
  - German light cruiser SMS Emden bombards Madras, the only Indian city to be attacked by the Central Powers in the War.
- September 25 – World War I: The first Battle of Albert begins as part of the Race to the Sea.
- September 26 – The United States Federal Trade Commission (FTC) is established, by the Federal Trade Commission Act.
- September 28 – World War I: The First Battle of the Aisne ends indecisively.

=== October ===
- October 3 – World War I: 25,000 Canadian troops depart for Europe.
- October 4
  - The 1914 Burdur earthquake occurs in Turkey.
  - The Manifesto of the Ninety-Three is signed by prominent academics supporting the early German war effort.
- October 9 – World War I: Siege of Antwerp: Antwerp (Belgium) falls to German troops.
- October 14 – World War I: The Canadian Expeditionary Force arrives on 32 ocean liners in Plymouth Sound.
- October 16–31 – World War I: Battle of the Yser: The Belgian army halts the German advance, but with heavy losses.
- October 19 – World War I:
  - The First Battle of Ypres begins.
  - The Race to the Sea effectively ends, with the Western Front reaching the Belgian coast.
- October 27 – World War I:
  - British super-dreadnought battleship HMS Audacious (23,400 tons) is sunk off Tory Island, north-west of Ireland, by a minefield laid by the armed German merchant-cruiser Berlin.
  - The Greek army occupies Northern Epirus with the approval of the Allies.
- October 28 – World War I:
  - Battle of Penang, Malaya: German cruiser Emden sinks a Russian cruiser and French destroyer, before escaping.
  - Participants in the Assassination of Archduke Franz Ferdinand of Austria are sentenced at Sarajevo. Gavrilo Princip, being under 20 years of age at the time of the assassination, cannot be given the death penalty, and is given a 20-year prison sentence instead.
- October 29 – World War I: Ottoman warships shell Russian Black Sea ports; Russia, France and Britain declare war on the Ottoman Empire, November 1–5.
- October 31 – World War I: Battle of the Vistula River concludes in a Russian victory over German and Austro-Hungarian forces around Warsaw.

=== November ===
- November 1 – World War I: Battle of Coronel – A British Royal Navy squadron commanded by Rear-Admiral Sir Christopher Cradock is met in the eastern Pacific and defeated by superior German forces led by Vice-Admiral Maximilian von Spee in the first British naval defeat of the war, resulting in the loss of HMS Good Hope and HMS Monmouth.
- November 5 – World War I:
  - Britain and France declare war on the Ottoman Empire. The United Kingdom annexes Cyprus, which it controls until the island's declaration of independence in 1960.
  - The Battle of Tanga ends, with the British Indian Expeditionary Force B failing to capture German East Africa defences.
- November 7 – Siege of Tsingtao: The Japanese and British seize Jiaozhou Bay in China, the base of the German East Asia Squadron.
- November 9 – World War I: Battle of Cocos – The German cruiser Emden, the last active warship of the Central Powers in the Indian Ocean, is sunk by the Australian cruiser Sydney.
- November 11 – With the 1914 Ottoman jihad proclamation, Ottoman Sultan Mehmed V proclaimed holy war.
- November 13 – Zaian War: Battle of El Herri – Zayanes (Berbers) in Morocco overpower French forces.
- November 16 – A year after being created by passage of the Federal Reserve Act of 1913, the Federal Reserve Bank of the United States officially opens for business.
- November 23 – Mexican Revolution: The last U.S. forces withdraw from Veracruz, occupied seven months earlier in response to the Tampico Affair; Venustiano Carranza's troops take over, and Carranza makes the town his headquarters.
- November 24 – Benito Mussolini is expelled from the Italian Socialist Party.
- November 28 – World War I: Following a war-induced closure in July, the New York Stock Exchange re-opens for bond trading.

=== December ===
- December 2 – Serbian Campaign (World War I): Austro-Hungarian forces occupy Belgrade, Serbia.
- December 5 – The Imperial Trans-Antarctic Expedition begins its attempt to make the first land crossing of Antarctica.
- December 8 – World War I: Battle of the Falkland Islands: A superior British Royal Navy squadron under Doveton Sturdee defeats ships of the Imperial German Navy under Maximilian von Spee (who goes down with his ship).
- December 12 – The New York Stock Exchange re-opens fully, having been closed since August 1, except for bond trading.
- December 15 – Hōjō Coal Mine Disaster: A gas explosion at the Mitsubishi Hōjō mine in Kyūshū, Japan, kills 687 people (the worst coal mine disaster in Japanese history).
- December 16 – World War I: Raid on Scarborough, Hartlepool and Whitby: Imperial German Navy battlecruisers bombard British North Sea ports, resulting in 137 deaths, mostly civilians.
- December 17 – United States President Woodrow Wilson signs the Harrison Narcotics Tax Act. This begins the ongoing international war on drugs.
- December 18 – Egypt becomes a British protectorate.
- December 19
  - Serbian Campaign (World War I): The Battle of Kolubara ends, resulting in a decisive Serbian victory over Austria-Hungary.
  - Mohandas Gandhi leaves England, sailing for India on this date (accompanied by his wife Kasturba). He begins to learn the Bengali language whilst on board.
- December 20 – Tokyo Station officially opens in Japan, replacing Shinbashi Station as Tokyo's main terminal.
- December 24 – World War I: An unofficial and temporary Christmas truce begins between British and German soldiers on the Western Front.
- December 25 – World War I: Cuxhaven Raid: British aircraft launched from warships attack the German port of Cuxhaven with submarine support, although little damage is caused.

=== Date unknown ===
- Oxymorphone, a powerful narcotic analgesic closely related to morphine, is first developed in Germany.
- The first everyday items made of stainless steel come into public circulation.
- The Port of Orange, Texas, is dredged for the fabrication of vessels for the United States Navy.
- Watchmaker Glycine Watch SA is founded by Eugène Meylan in Switzerland.
- Fashion and perfumes company Puig is founded in Barcelona.

== Births ==
=== January ===
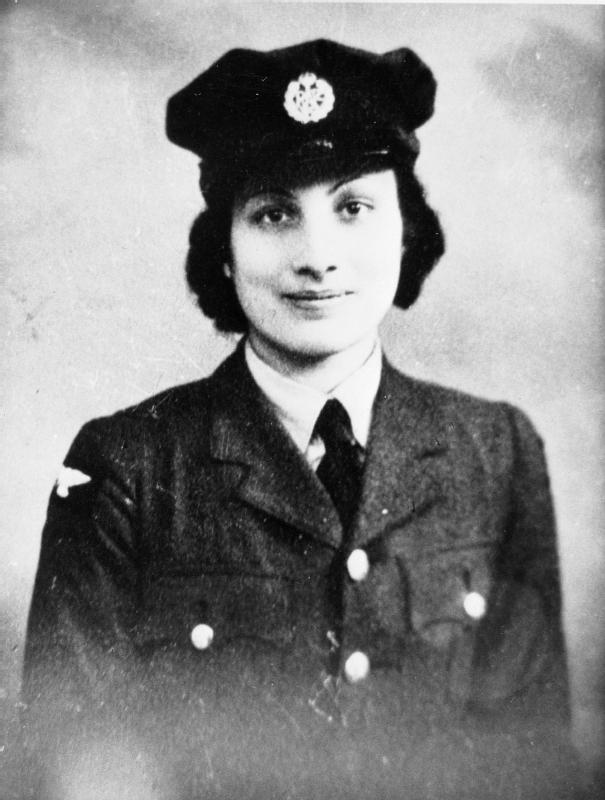
Noor Inayat Khan

- January 1 – Noor Inayat Khan (aka Nora Baker), World War II heroine (executed 1944)
- January 5 – George Reeves, American actor (Superman) (d. 1959)
- January 9 – Kenny Clarke, American jazz drummer and bandleader (d. 1985)
- January 10 – Yu Kuo-hwa, Chinese politician, 23rd Premier of the Republic of China (d. 2000)
- January 14
  - Magda Fedor, Hungarian sports shooter (d. 2017)
  - Harold Russell, Canadian actor (d. 2002)
- January 15 – Hugh Trevor-Roper, English historian (d. 2003)
- January 18 – Arno Schmidt, German author (d. 1979)
- January 26 – Dürrüşehvar Sultan, Ottoman princess (d. 2006)
- January 30 – John Ireland, Canadian-born actor (d. 1992)
- January 31 – Jersey Joe Walcott, American boxer (d. 1994)

=== February ===
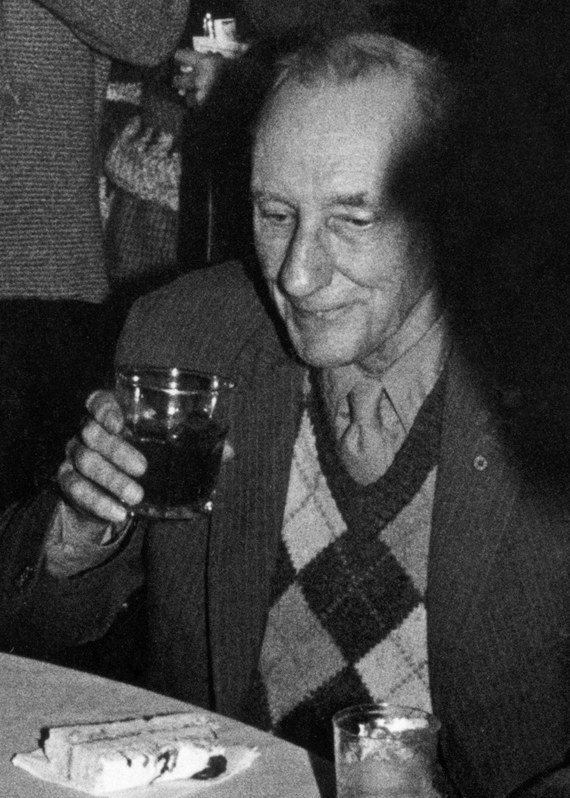
William S. Burroughs

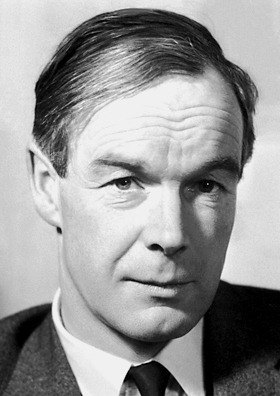
Alan Hodgkin

- February 3 – Mary Carlisle, American actress, singer and dancer (d. 2018)
- February 4 – Alfred Andersch, German writer (d. 1980)
- February 5
  - William S. Burroughs, American author (d. 1997)
  - Alan Hodgkin, British scientist, recipient of the Nobel Prize in Physiology or Medicine (d. 1998)
- February 10 – Larry Adler, American musician (d. 2001)
- February 12 – Lazar Koliševski, Yugoslav communist political leader (d. 2000)
- February 15 – Kevin McCarthy, American actor (d. 2010)
- February 18 – Mahmoud Zulfikar, Egyptian film director (d. 1970)
- February 22 – Renato Dulbecco, Italian-born American virologist, recipient of the Nobel Prize in Physiology or Medicine (d. 2012)
- February 23 – Theofiel Middelkamp, Dutch cyclist (d. 2005)

=== March ===
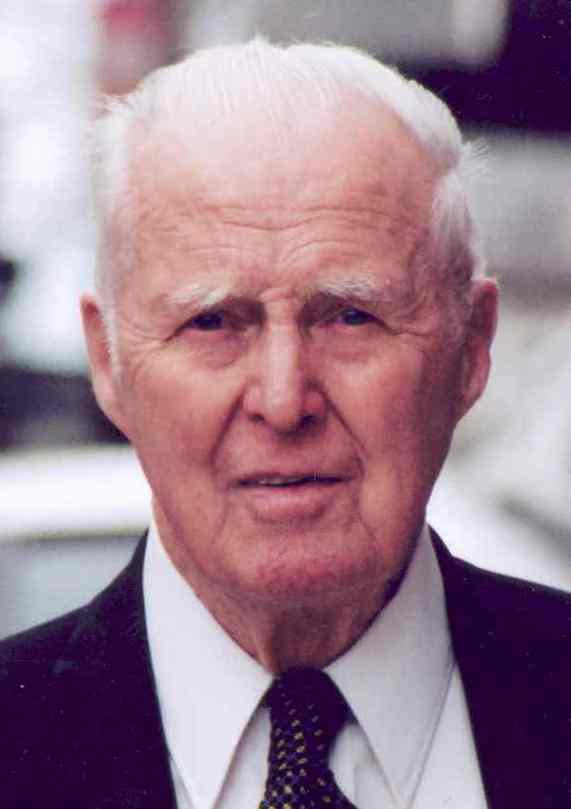
Norman Borlaug

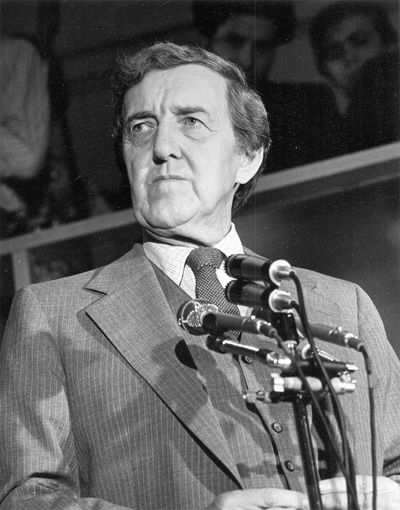
Edmund Muskie

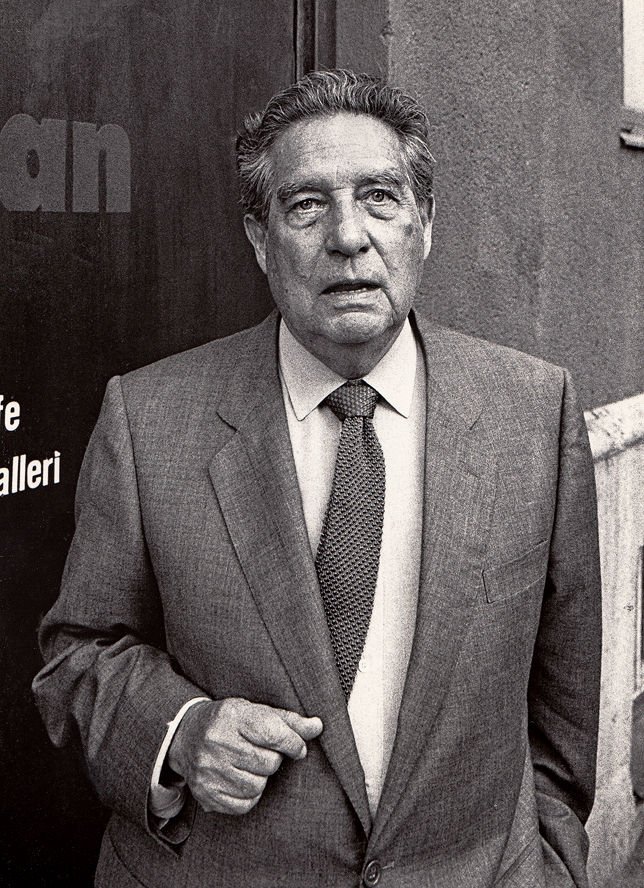
Octavio Paz

- March 1 – Ralph Ellison, American writer (d. 1994)
- March 2 – Martin Ritt, American director (d. 1990)
- March 3 – Asger Jorn, Danish painter (d. 1973)
- March 4 – Ward Kimball, American cartoonist (d. 2002)
- March 8 – Yakov Zeldovich, Russian physicist (d. 1987)
- March 17 – Juan Carlos Onganía, 35th President of Argentina (d. 1995)
- March 19 – Jiang Qing, Chinese politician (d. 1991)
- March 21 – Paul Tortelier, French cellist and composer (d. 1990)
- March 25 – Norman Borlaug, American agricultural scientist, recipient of the Nobel Peace Prize (d. 2009)
- March 26 – William Westmoreland, American Vietnam War general (d. 2005)
- March 28 – Edmund Muskie, American politician (d. 1996)
- March 31 – Octavio Paz, Mexican diplomat, writer, and Nobel Prize laureate (d. 1998)

=== April ===
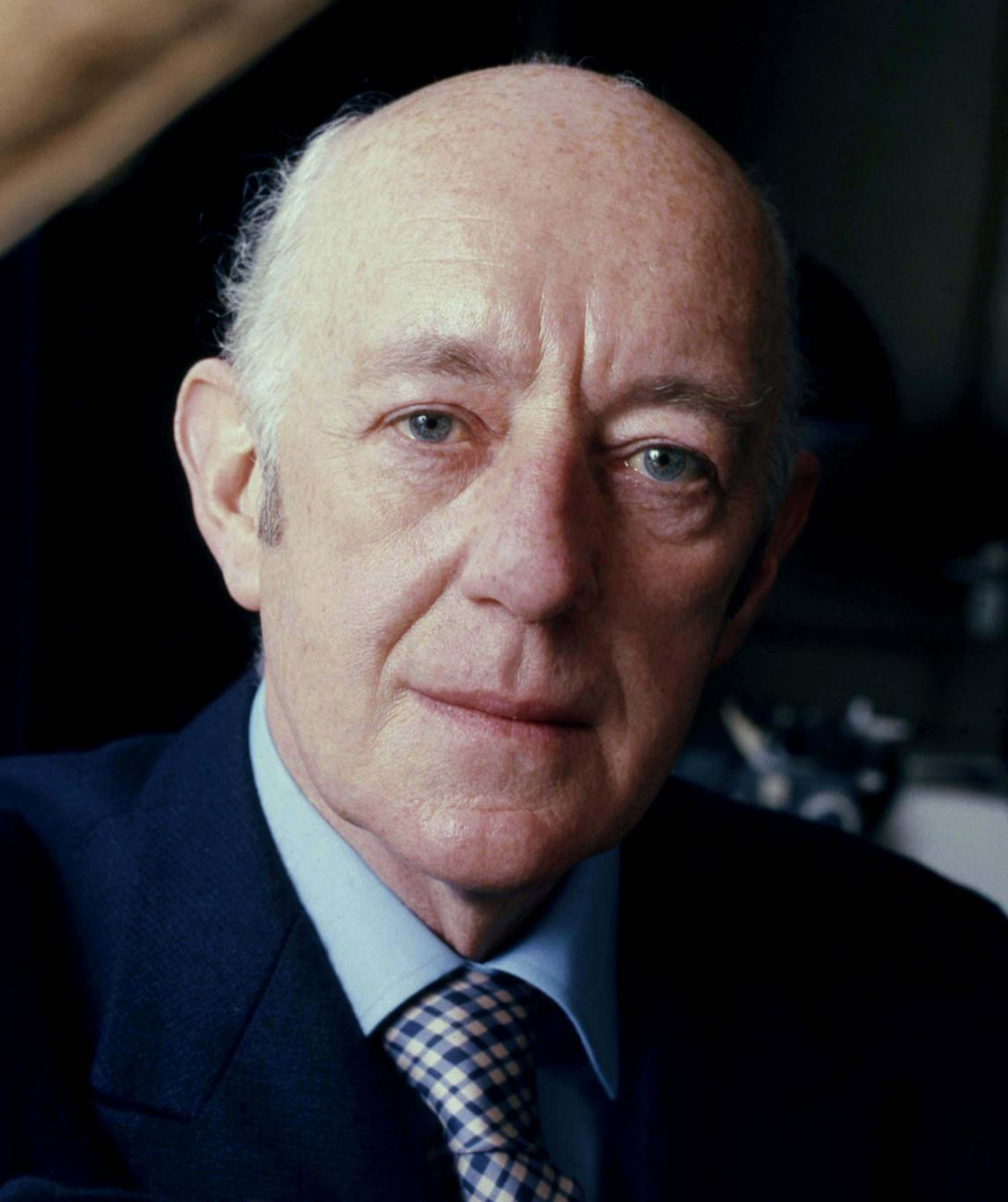
Alec Guinness

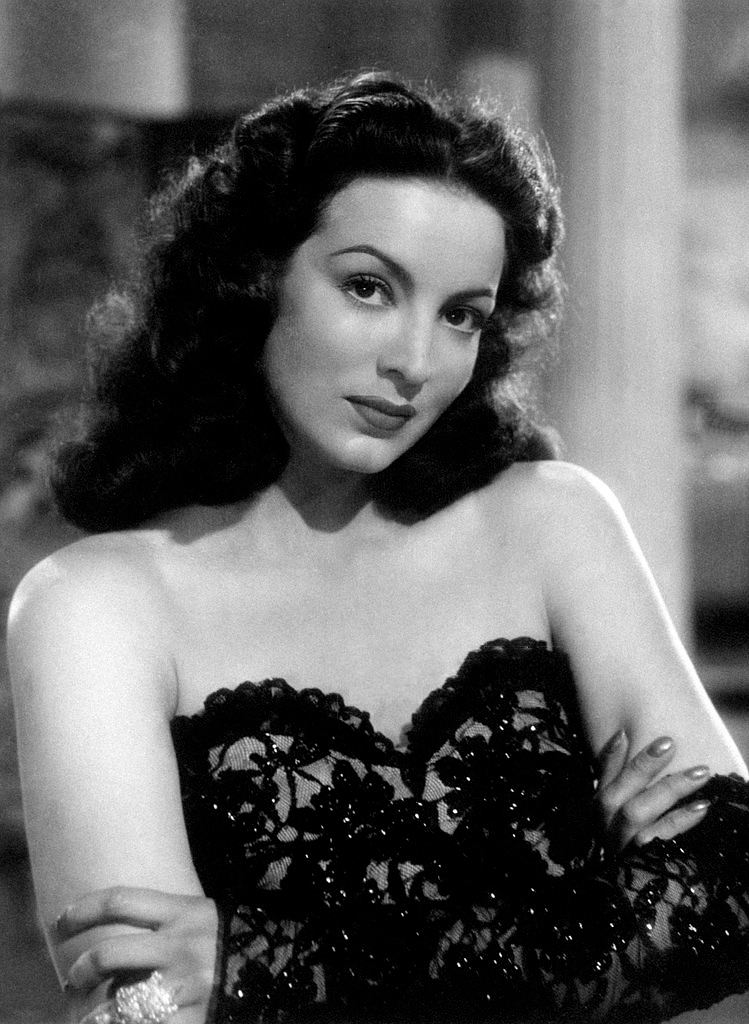
María Félix

- April 2
  - Alec Guinness, English actor (d. 2000)
  - Hans Wegner, Danish furniture designer (d. 2007)
- April 3 – Sam Manekshaw, Field Marshal of the Indian Army (d. 2008)
- April 4
  - David Goodall, English-born Australian botanist and ecologist (d. 2018)
  - Marguerite Duras, French author, director (d. 1996)
- April 8 – María Félix, Mexican actress (d.2002)
- April 11
  - Norman McLaren, Scottish-born Canadian animator and director (d. 1987)
  - Robert Stanfield, Premier of Nova Scotia (d. 2003)
- April 12
  - Armen Alchian, American economist (d. 2013)
  - Gretel Bergmann, German-Jewish athlete (d. 2017)
- April 22
  - B. R. Chopra, Indian film director (d. 2008)
  - Jan de Hartog, Dutch writer (d. 2002)
  - Michael Wittmann, German tank commander (d. 1944)
- April 24 – Jan Karski, Polish World War II resistance movement fighter (d. 2000)
- April 25 – Marcos Pérez Jiménez, 51st President of Venezuela (d. 2001)
- April 26
  - Bernard Malamud, American author (d. 1986)
  - Lilian Rolfe, French-born World War II heroine (d. 1945)
- April 28 – Yakov Novichenko, Soviet military officer (d. 1994)
- April 30 – Dorival Caymmi, Brazilian songwriter (d. 2008)

=== May ===
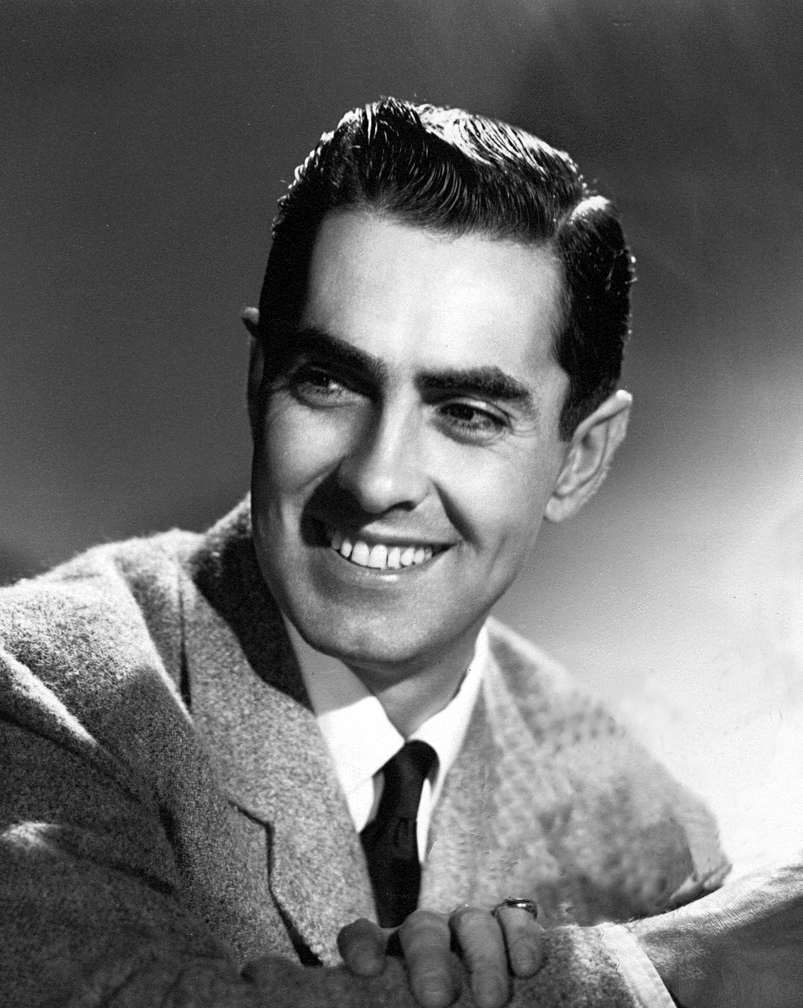
Tyrone Power

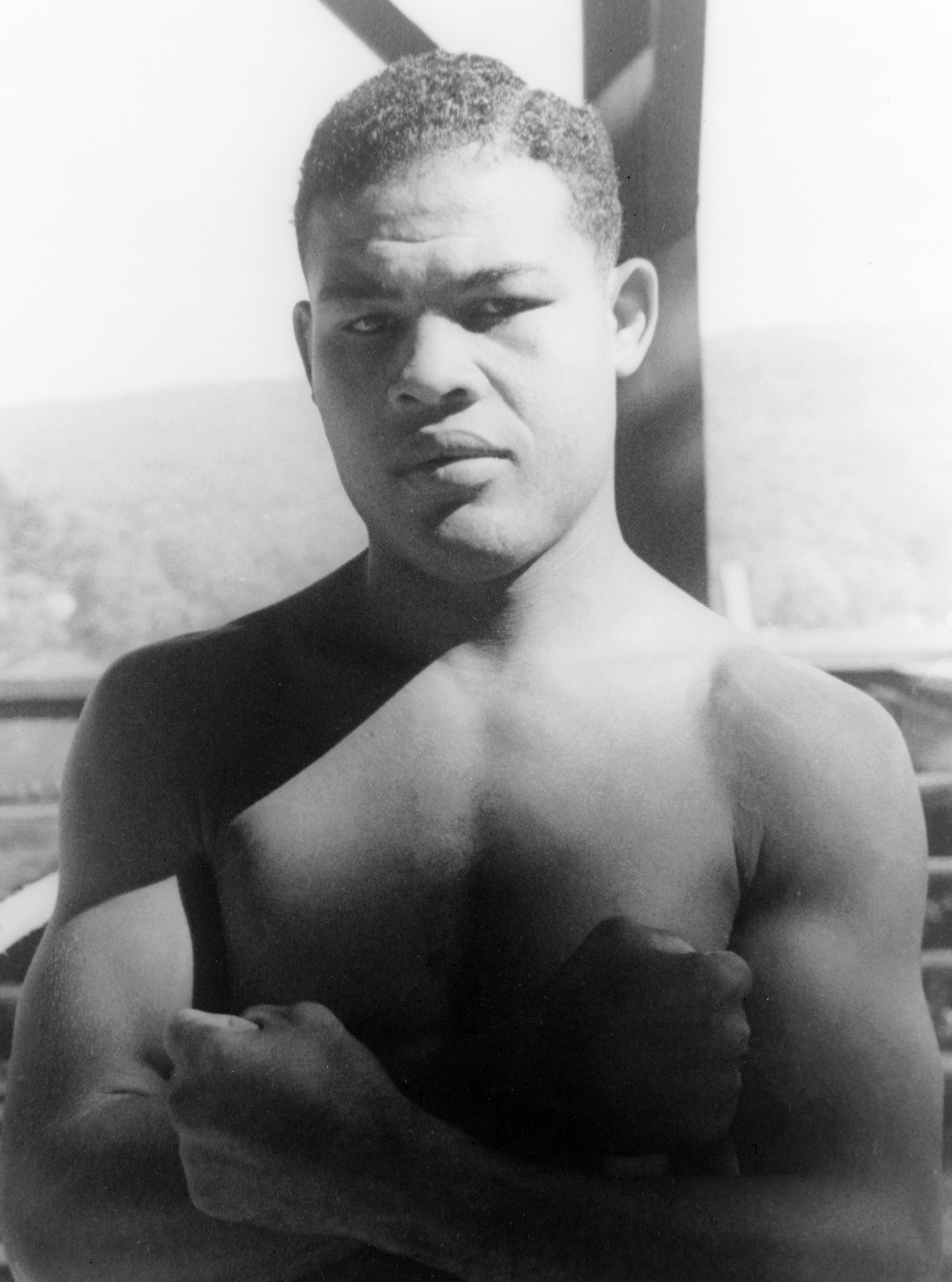
Joe Louis

- May 5 – Tyrone Power, American actor (d. 1958)
- May 7 – Ye Fei, Filipino-Chinese general and politician (d. 1999)
- May 8 – Romain Gary, Lithuanian-born French writer, diplomat (d. 1980)
- May 9
  - Carlo Maria Giulini, Italian conductor (d. 2005)
  - Hank Snow, Canadian country musician (d. 1999)
- May 13 – Joe Louis, American boxer (d. 1981)
- May 14
  - Teodor Oizerman, Soviet and Russian philosopher (d. 2017)
  - Corneliu Coposu, Romanian politician (d. 1995)
  - Hideko Maehata, Japanese swimmer (d. 1995)
- May 16 – Edward T. Hall, American anthropologist (d. 2009)
- May 18
  - Georg von Tiesenhausen, German-American rocket scientist (d. 2018)
  - Boris Christoff, Bulgarian opera singer (d. 1993)
  - Pierre Balmain, French fashion designer (d. 1982)
- May 19 – Max Perutz, Austrian-born British molecular biologist, recipient of the Nobel Prize in Chemistry (d. 2002)
- May 22 – Sun Ra, American musician (d. 1993)
- May 24
  - Lilli Palmer, German actress (d. 1986)
  - George Tabori, Hungarian writer and director (d. 2007)
- May 26 – Dulce de Souza Lopes Pontes, Brazilian religious sister (d. 1992)
- May 31 – Akira Ifukube, Japanese classical music, film composer (d. 2006)

=== June ===
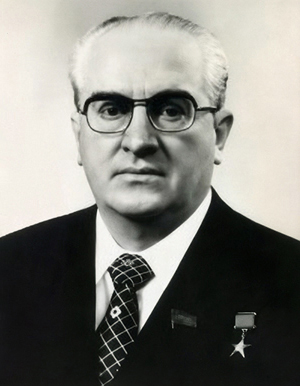
Yuri Andropov

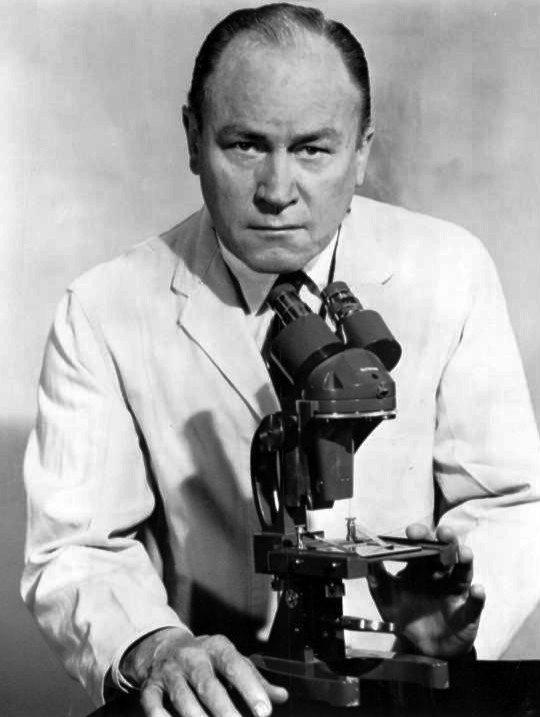
E.G. Marshall

- June 6 – Zhang Jingfu, Chinese politician (d. 2015)
- June 10 – Joseph DePietro, American weightlifter (d. 1999)
- June 12 – Go Seigen, Japanese Go player (d. 2014)
- June 14
  - Gisèle Casadesus, French actress (d. 2017)
  - Ruthven Todd, Scottish poet, artist and novelist (d. 1978)
- June 15
  - Yuri Andropov, Soviet leader (d. 1984)
  - Saul Steinberg, Romanian-born American cartoonist (d. 1999)
- June 18 – E. G. Marshall, American actor (d. 1998)
- June 20 – Muazzez İlmiye Çığ, Turkish archaeologist (d. 2024)
- June 21 – William Vickrey, Canadian economist, Nobel Prize laureate (d. 1996)
- June 26
  - Laurie Lee, English author (d. 1997)
  - Sultan Ahmad Nanupuri, Bangladeshi Islamic scholar and teacher (d. 1997)
  - Princess Sophie of Greece and Denmark (d. 2001)
- June 27 – Margaret Ekpo, Nigerian women's rights activist, social mobilizer and politician (d. 2006)
- June 29 – Rafael Kubelík, Czech conductor (d. 1996)
- June 30 – Francisco da Costa Gomes, 15th President of Portugal (d. 2001)

=== July ===
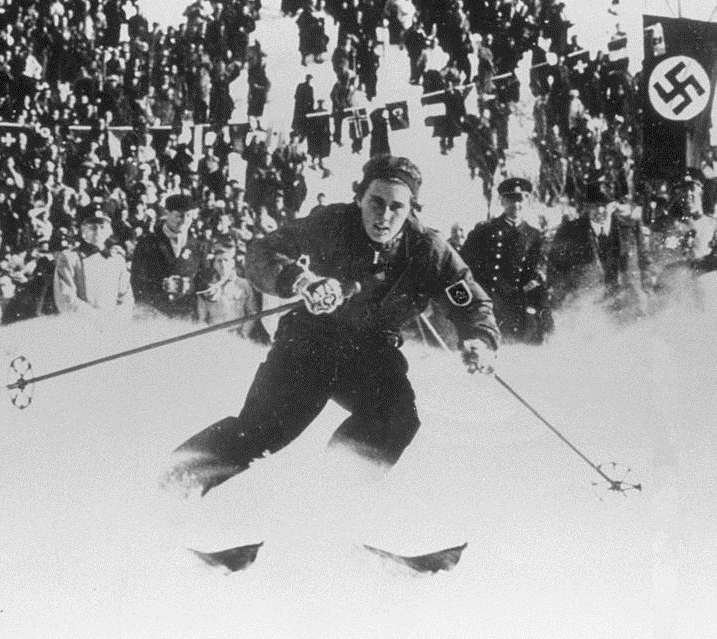
Christl Cranz

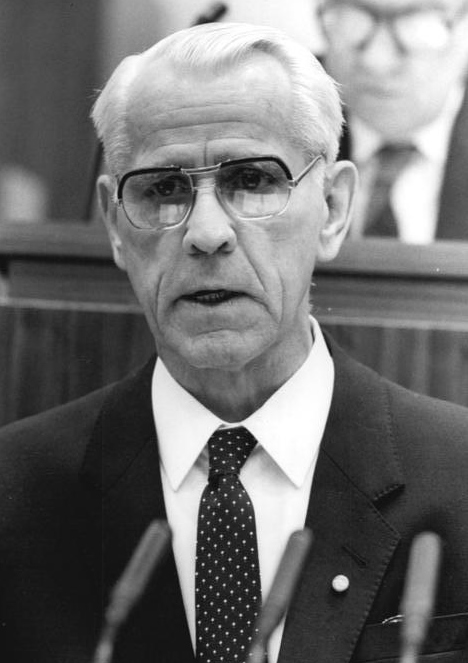
Willi Stoph

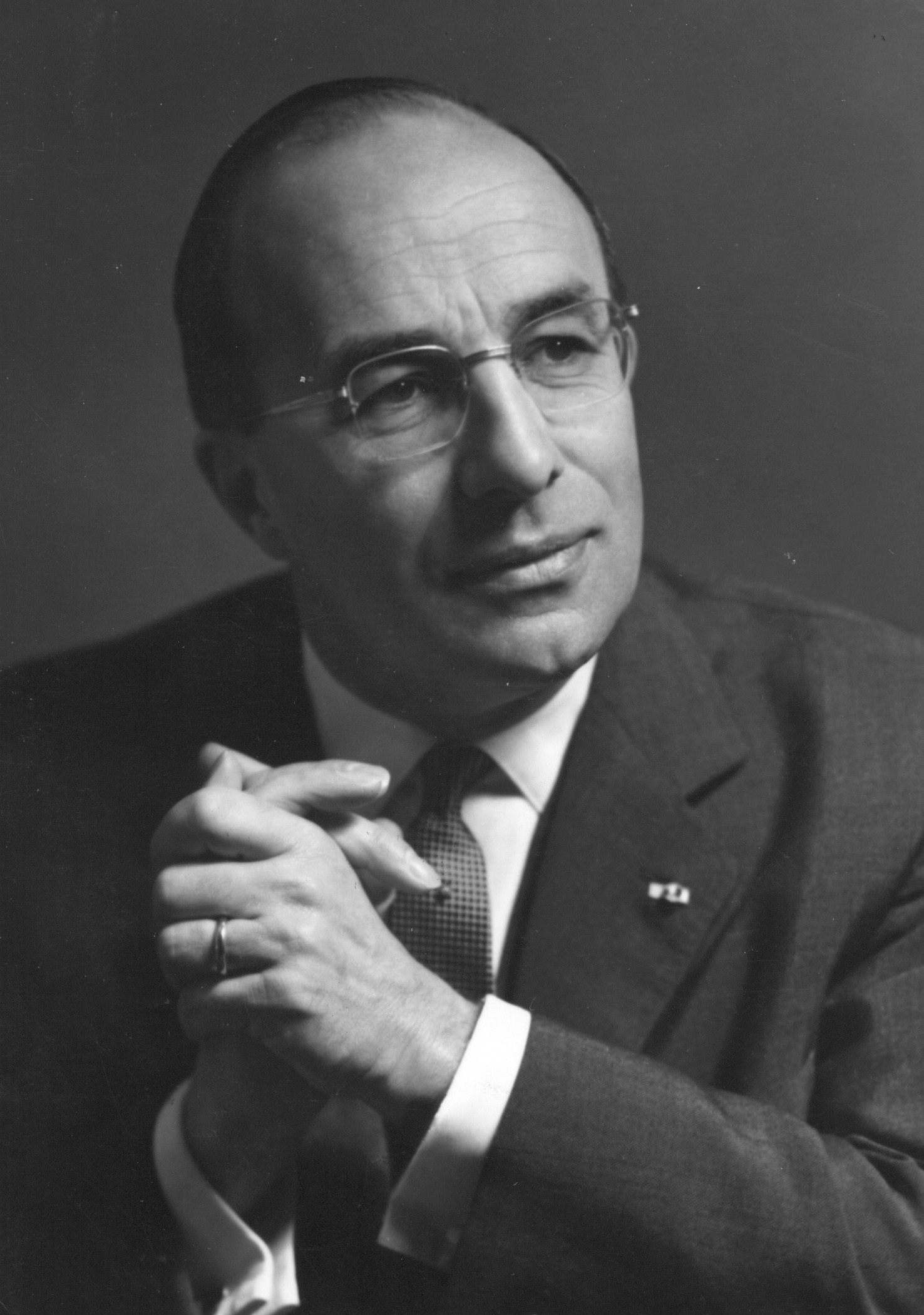
Jo Cals

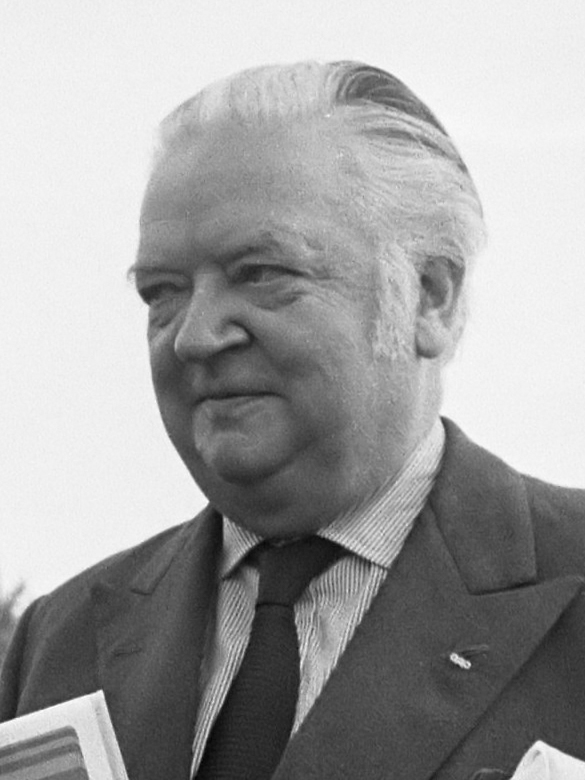
Michael Morris, 3rd Baron Killanin

- July 1 – Christl Cranz, German alpine skier (d. 2004)
- July 2 – Erich Topp, German U-boat commander (d. 2005)
- July 8
  - Jyoti Basu, Indian politician (d. 2010)
  - Billy Eckstine, American jazz musician and singer (d. 1993)
- July 9 – Willi Stoph, Prime Minister (1964–1973, 1976–1989) and Chairman of the Council of State (1973–1976) of the GDR (d. 1999)
- July 10 – Joe Shuster, Canadian-born American comic book author (d. 1992)
- July 11
  - Mohammad Al-Abbasi, Prime Minister of Jordan (d. 1972)
  - Aníbal Troilo, Argentine tango musician (d. 1975)
- July 13 – Cyril Stevenson, Bahamian politician and newspaper publisher (d. 2006)
- July 15
  - Birabongse Bhanudej, Siamese prince, racing driver, sailor and pilot (d. 1985)
  - Akhtar Hameed Khan, Indian-born pioneer of microcredit in developing countries (d. 1999)
- July 18
  - Gino Bartali, Italian road cyclist (d. 2000)
  - Jo Cals, Dutch politician and jurist, Prime Minister of the Netherlands (1965–1966) (d. 1971)
- July 19
  - Hans Maršálek, Austrian political activist, spy, detective and historian (d. 2011)
  - Ken Macalister, Canadian World War II hero (d. 1944)
- July 20 – Charilaos Florakis, Greek Communist leader (d. 2005)
- July 21 – Suso Cecchi d'Amico, Italian screenwriter and actress (d. 2010)
- July 22 – Charles Régnier, German actor, director, radio actor and translator (d. 2001)
- July 24
  - Frances Oldham Kelsey, American Food and Drug Administration reviewer (d. 2015)
  - Ed Mirvish, Canadian businessman and philanthropist (d. 2007)
- July 30 – Michael Morris, 3rd Baron Killanin, Irish president of the International Olympic Committee (d. 1999)
- July 31 – Louis de Funès, French comedy actor (d. 1983)

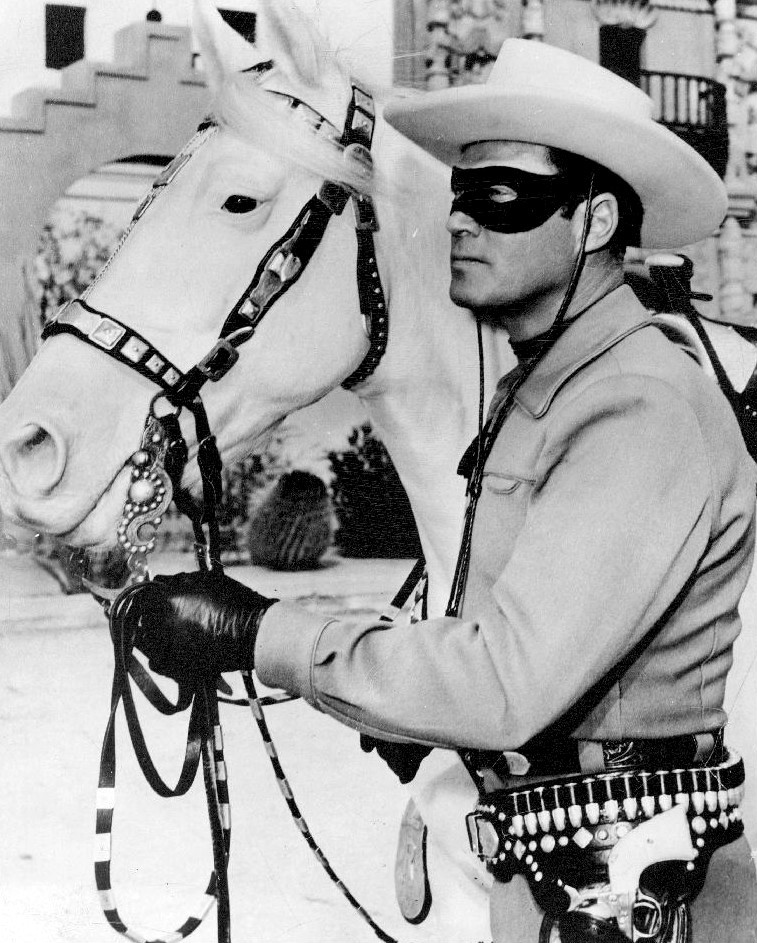
Clayton Moore

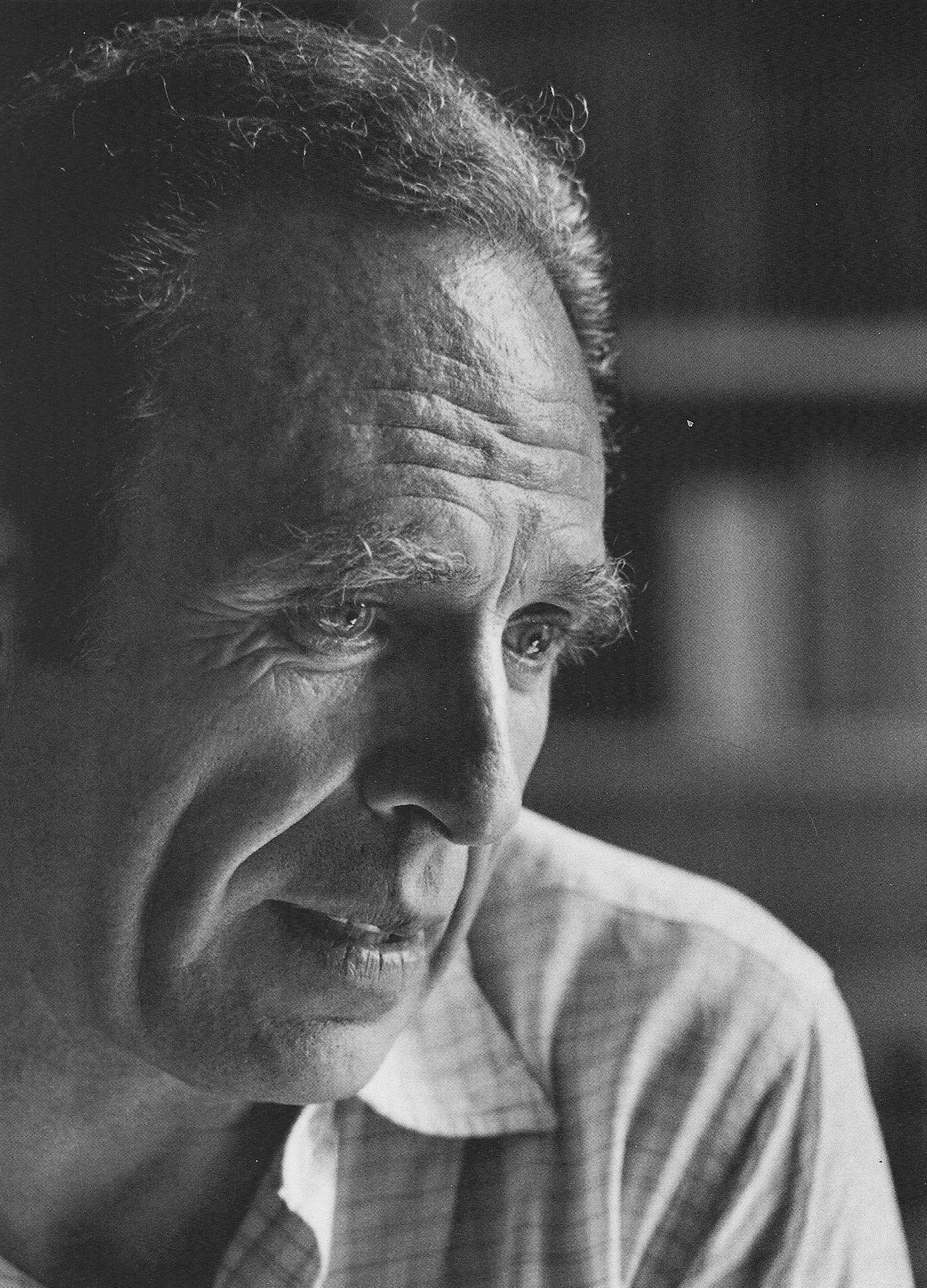
Adolfo Bioy Casares

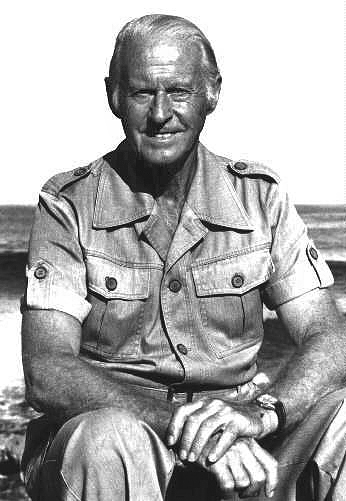
Thor Heyerdahl

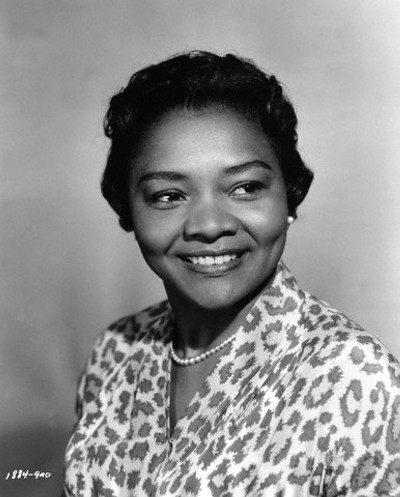
Juanita Moore

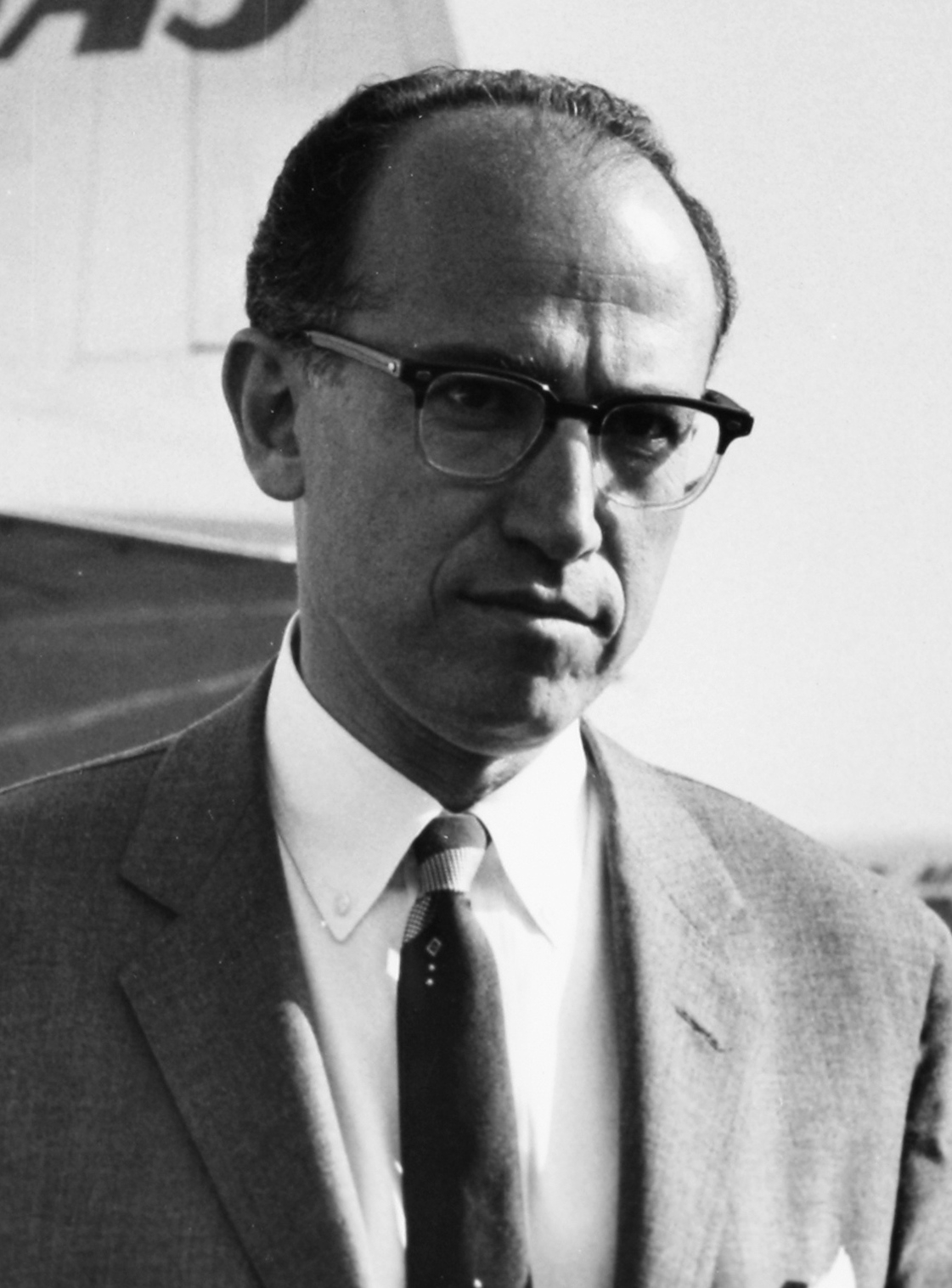
Jonas Salk

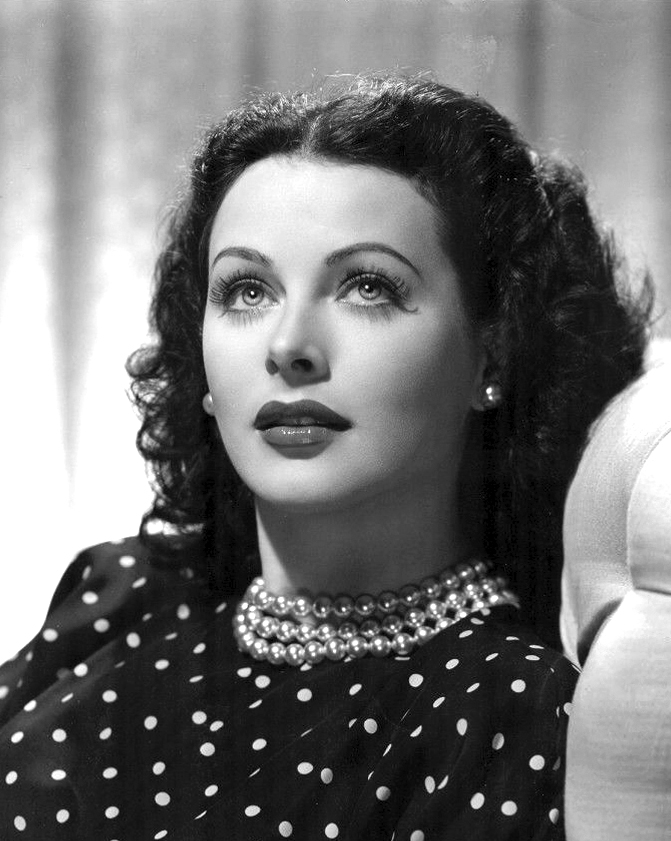
Hedy Lamarr

=== August ===
- August 2 – Beatrice Straight, American actress (d. 2001)
- August 8 – Yabing Masalon Dulo, Filipino textile master weaver and dyer (d. 2021)
- August 9
  - Ferenc Fricsay, Hungarian conductor (d. 1963)
  - Tove Jansson, Finnish author (d. 2001)
- August 10 – Ken Annakin, British film director (d. 2009)
- August 15 – Paul Rand, American graphic designer (d. 1996)
- August 19 – Maurice Bourgès-Maunoury, French politician, 95th Prime Minister of France (d. 1993)
- August 26 – Julio Cortázar, Argentine writer (d. 1984)

=== September ===
- September 5
  - Isolina Ferré, Puerto Rican Roman Catholic nun (d. 2000)
  - Gail Kubik, American composer (d. 1984)
  - Nicanor Parra, Chilean poet (d. 2018)
- September 7 – James Van Allen, American physicist (d. 2006)
- September 10
  - Terence O'Neill, 4th Prime Minister of Northern Ireland (d. 1990)
  - Robert Wise, American film director and producer (d. 2005)
- September 11 – Pavle, Serbian Patriarch (d. 2009)
- September 12
  - Desmond Llewelyn, Welsh actor (d. 1999)
  - Janusz Żurakowski, Polish fighter and test pilot (d. 2004)
- September 14 – Clayton Moore, American actor (The Lone Ranger) (d. 1999)
- September 15
  - Creighton Abrams, U.S. Vietnam War general (d. 1974)
  - Subandrio, Indonesian politician (d. 2004)
  - Adolfo Bioy Casares, Argentine writer (d. 1999)
  - Jens Otto Krag, Danish politician, 18th Prime Minister of Denmark (d. 1978)
- September 17 – Lambert Mascarenhas, Indian journalist (d. 2021)
- September 18
  - Jack Cardiff, British cinematographer, director and photographer (d. 2009)
- September 20 – Kenneth More, English actor (d. 1982)
- September 23 – Omar Ali Saifuddien III, Sultan of Brunei (d. 1986)
- September 24 – John Kerr, 18th Governor-General of Australia (d. 1991)
- September 25 – Elena Lucena, Argentine film actress (d. 2015)
- September 26 – Jack LaLanne, American fitness, exercise and nutritional expert (d. 2011)

=== October ===
- October 1 – Daniel J. Boorstin, American historian, writer and Librarian of Congress (d. 2004)
- October 6 – Thor Heyerdahl, Norwegian explorer (d. 2002)
- October 7 – Begum Akhtar, Indian singer (d. 1974)
- October 10 – Agostino Straulino, Italian sailor and sailboat racer (d. 2004)
- October 14 – Raymond Davis Jr., American physicist, Nobel Prize laureate (d. 2006)
- October 15 – Mohammed Zahir Shah, King of Afghanistan (d. 2007)
- October 17 – Jerry Siegel, American comic book author (d. 1996)
- October 19 – Juanita Moore, African-American actress (d. 2014)
- October 21 – Martin Gardner, American writer (d. 2010)
- October 24 – František Čapek, Czech canoeist (d. 2008)
- October 25 – John Berryman, American poet (d. 1972)
- October 26 – Jackie Coogan, American actor (d. 1984)
- October 27 – Dylan Thomas, Welsh poet and author (d. 1953)
- October 28
  - Jonas Salk, American medical scientist (d. 1995)
  - Richard Laurence Millington Synge, English chemist, Nobel Prize laureate (d. 1994)
- October 30 – Leabua Jonathan, 2nd Prime Minister of Lesotho (d. 1987)

=== November ===
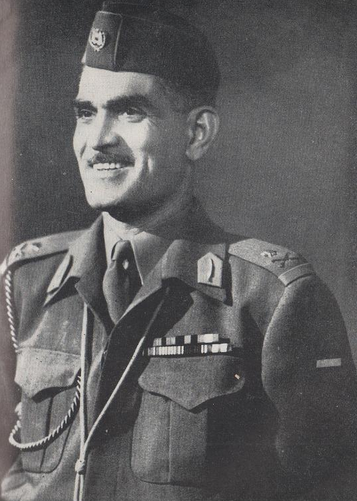
Abd al-Karim Qasim

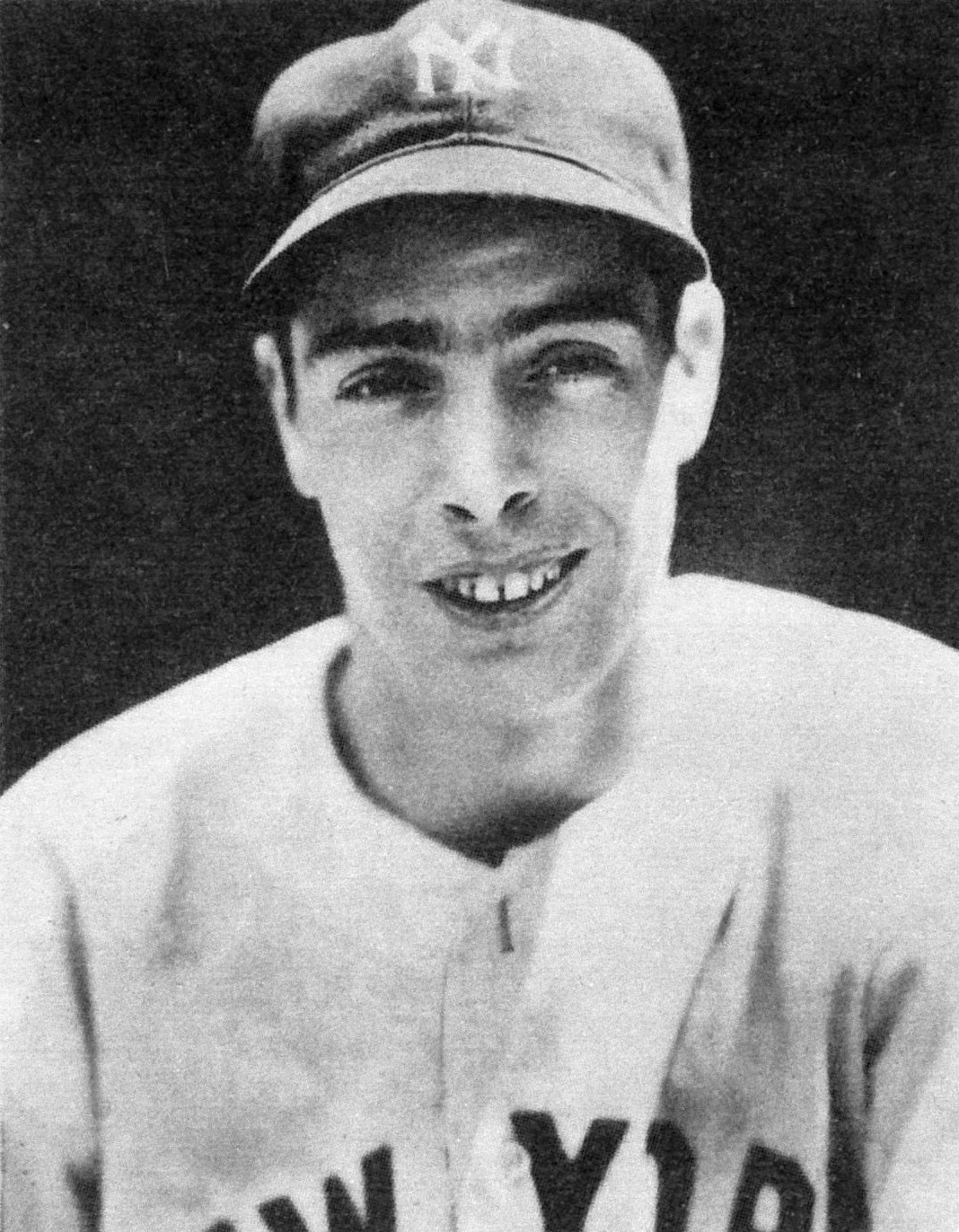
Joe DiMaggio

- November 1 – Moshe Teitelbaum, Hassidic rabbi (d. 2006)
- November 2 – Ray Walston, American actor (d. 2001)
- November 8
  - George Dantzig, Polish-born American mathematician (d. 2005)
  - Norman Lloyd, American actor, producer and director (d. 2021)
  - Eileen Kramer, Australian dancer, artist, performer and choreographer (d. 2024)
- November 9 – Hedy Lamarr, Austrian actress (d. 2000)
- November 11
  - Howard Fast, American novelist and television writer (d. 2003)
  - Yue Yiqin, Chinese flying ace (d. 1937)
- November 13 – Amelia Bence, Argentine actress (d. 2016)
- November 18 – Bill Phillips, New Zealand economist (d. 1975)
- November 21 – Abd al-Karim Qasim, Iraqi general, 24th Prime Minister of Iraq (d. 1963)
- November 25 – Joe DiMaggio, American baseball player (d. 1999)

=== December ===
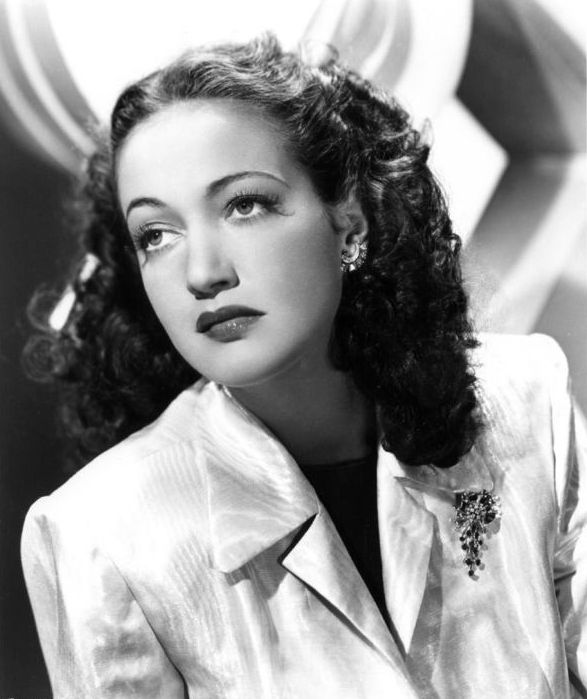
Dorothy Lamour

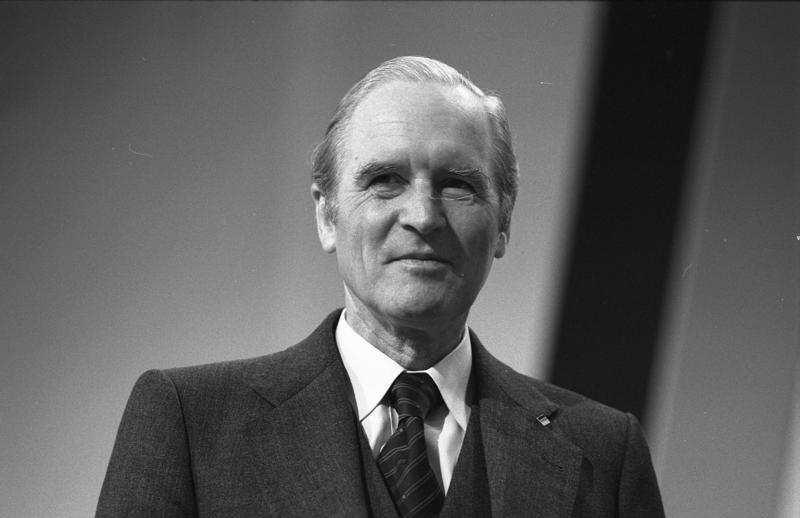
Karl Carstens

- December 10 – Dorothy Lamour, American actress and singer (d. 1996)
- December 12 – Patrick O'Brian, British novelist (d. 2000)
- December 13 – Larry Parks, American actor (d. 1975)
- December 14
  - Karl Carstens, president of West Germany (d. 1992)
  - Frane Milčinski, Slovene poet, satirist, comedian, actor, children's writer and director (d. 1988)
- December 21 – Frank Fenner, Australian virologist and microbiologist (d. 2010)
- December 26 – Richard Widmark, American actor (d. 2008)
- December 28 – Bidia Dandaron, Soviet Buddhist author and teacher (d. 1974)

=== Date unknown ===
- Makhosini Dlamini, 1st Prime Minister of Swaziland (d. 1978)

== Deaths ==
=== January ===
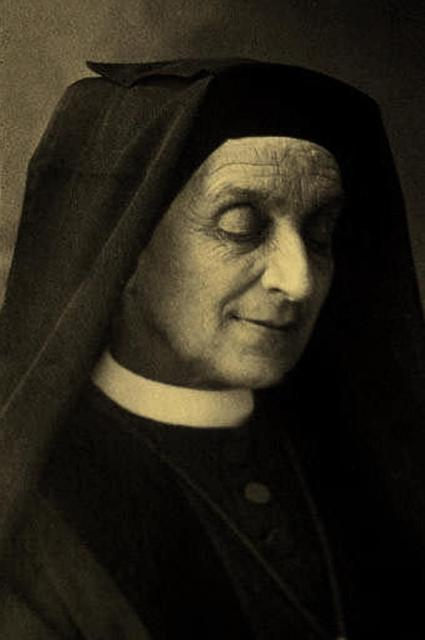
Leonie Aviat

- January 8 – Simon Bolivar Buckner, American soldier and politician, 30th governor of Kentucky (b. 1823)
- January 10 – Leonie Aviat, French Roman Catholic religious sister and saint (b. 1844)
- January 11 – Carl Jacobsen, Danish brewer and patron of the arts (b. 1842)
- January 15 – Camilo Garcia de Polavieja, Spanish general (b. 1838)
- January 16 – Itō Sukeyuki, Japanese admiral (b. 1843)
- January 17 – Fernand Foureau, French explorer (b. 1850)
- January 19
  - Candelaria Figueredo, Cuban patriot (b. 1852)
  - Georges Picquart, French general and politician (b. 1854)
- January 26 – Jose Gabriel del Rosario Brochero, Argentine Roman Catholic priest and saint (b. 1840)

=== February ===
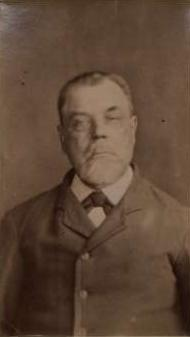
Per Pålsson

- February 1 – Albert Günther, German-born British zoologist (b. 1830)
- February 4 – Per Pålsson, Swedish criminal (b. 1828)
- February 13 – Alphonse Bertillon, French police officer and forensic scientist (b. 1853)
- February 20 – Federico Degetau, Puerto Rican politician (b. 1862)
- February 24 – Joshua Chamberlain, American Civil War general (b. 1828)
- February 25 – Sir John Tenniel, English illustrator (b. 1820)

=== March ===
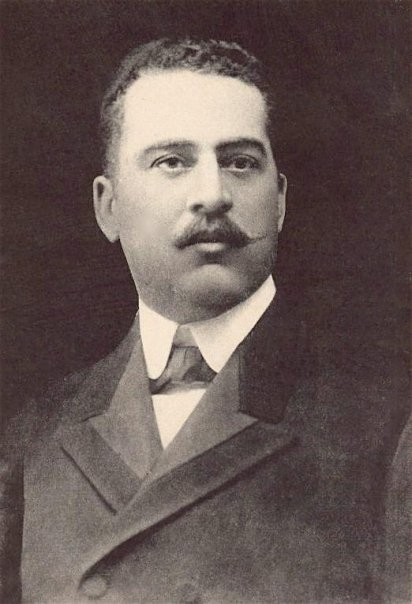
Carlos Felipe Morales

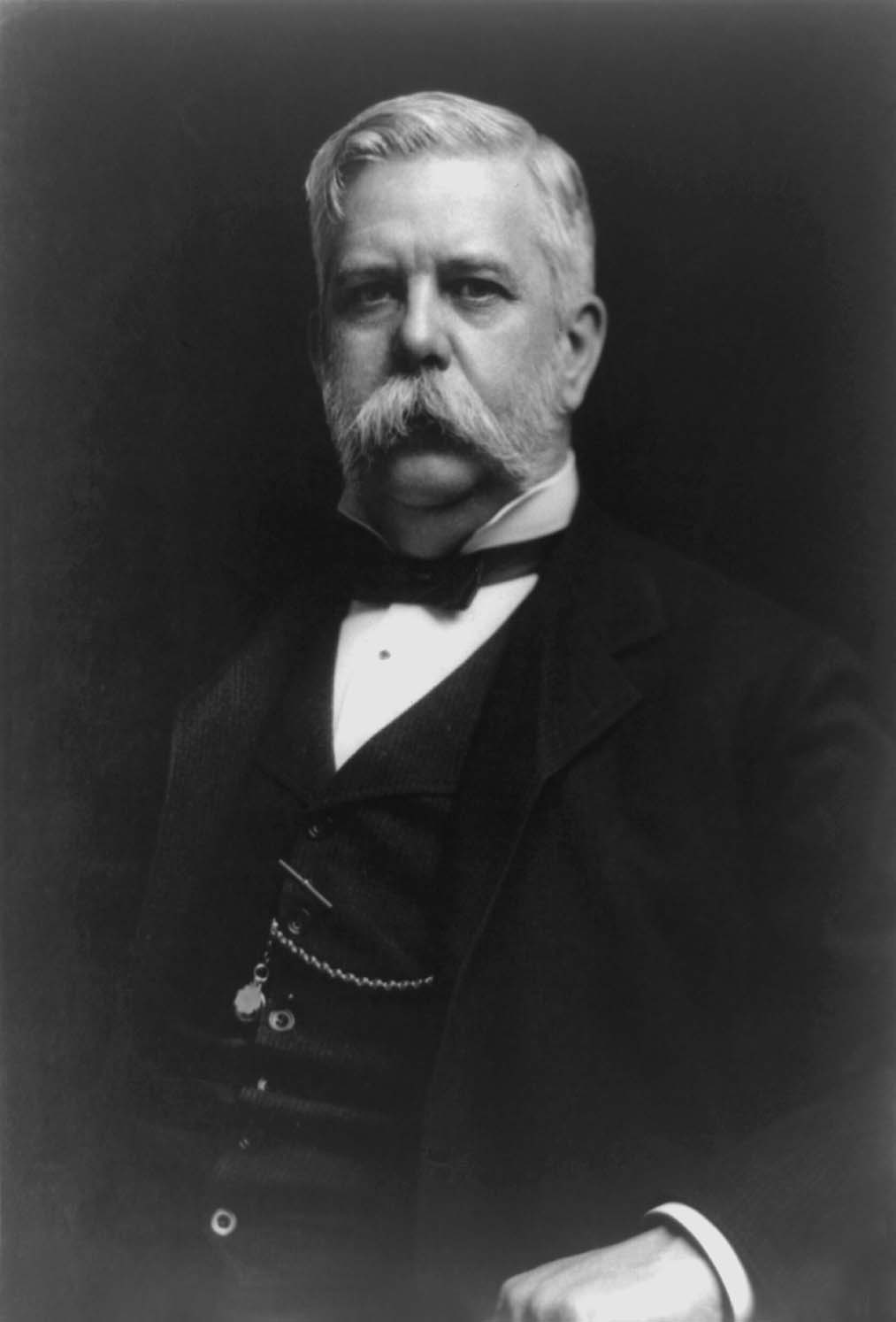
George Westinghouse

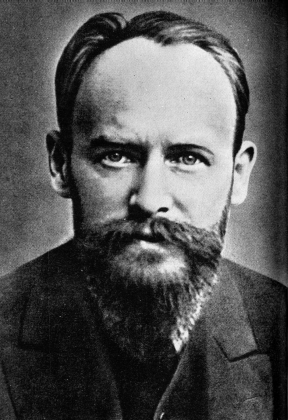
Christian Morgenstern

- March 1
  - Gilbert Elliot-Murray-Kynynmound, 4th Earl of Minto, British aristocrat and politician, 2-time Governor General of Canada (b. 1845)
  - Carlos Felipe Morales, Dominican Roman Catholic priest, politician and military figure, 30th President of the Dominican Republic (b. 1867)
- March 9 – José Luciano de Castro, Portuguese politician, 3-time Prime Minister of Portugal (b. 1834)
- March 12 – George Westinghouse, American entrepreneur (b. 1846)
- March 13
  - Hakeem Noor-ud-Din, Indian Muslim scholar (b. 1841)
  - María Tubau, Spanish actress (b. 1854)
- March 16
  - Gaston Calmette, French journalist, editor of Le Figaro (b. 1858)
  - Charles Albert Gobat, Swiss politician, recipient of the Nobel Peace Prize (b. 1843)
- March 18 – Andreas Beck, Norwegian explorer (b. 1864)
- March 19 – Giuseppe Mercalli, Italian volcanologist (b. 1850)
- March 22 – Allen Caperton Braxton, American lawyer (b. 1862)
- March 23 – Rafqa Pietra Choboq Ar-Rayès, Lebanese Maronite, Roman Catholic and Eastern Catholic nun and saint (b. 1832)
- March 25 – Frédéric Mistral, French writer, Nobel Prize laureate (b. 1830)
- March 31 – Christian Morgenstern, German poet and writer (b. 1871)

=== April ===
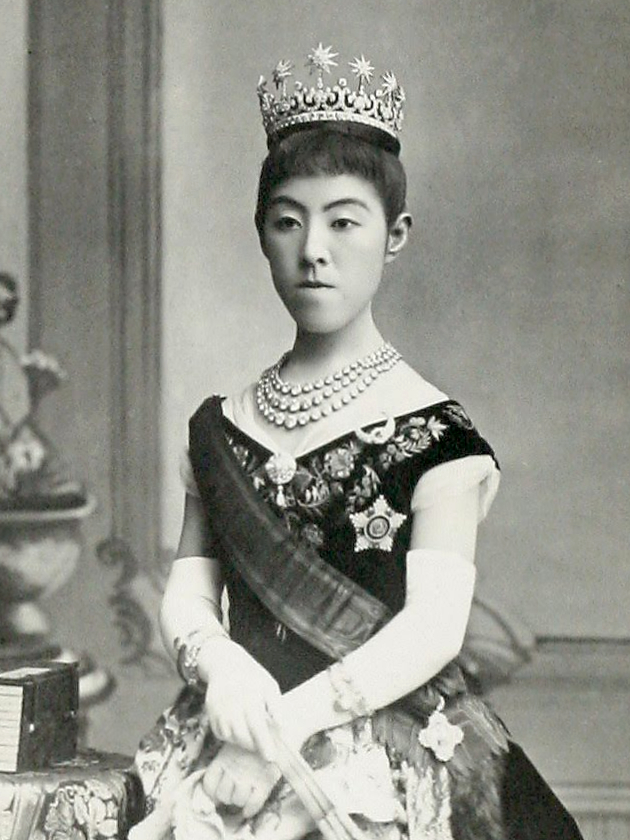
Empress Shōken

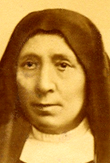
Elena Guerra

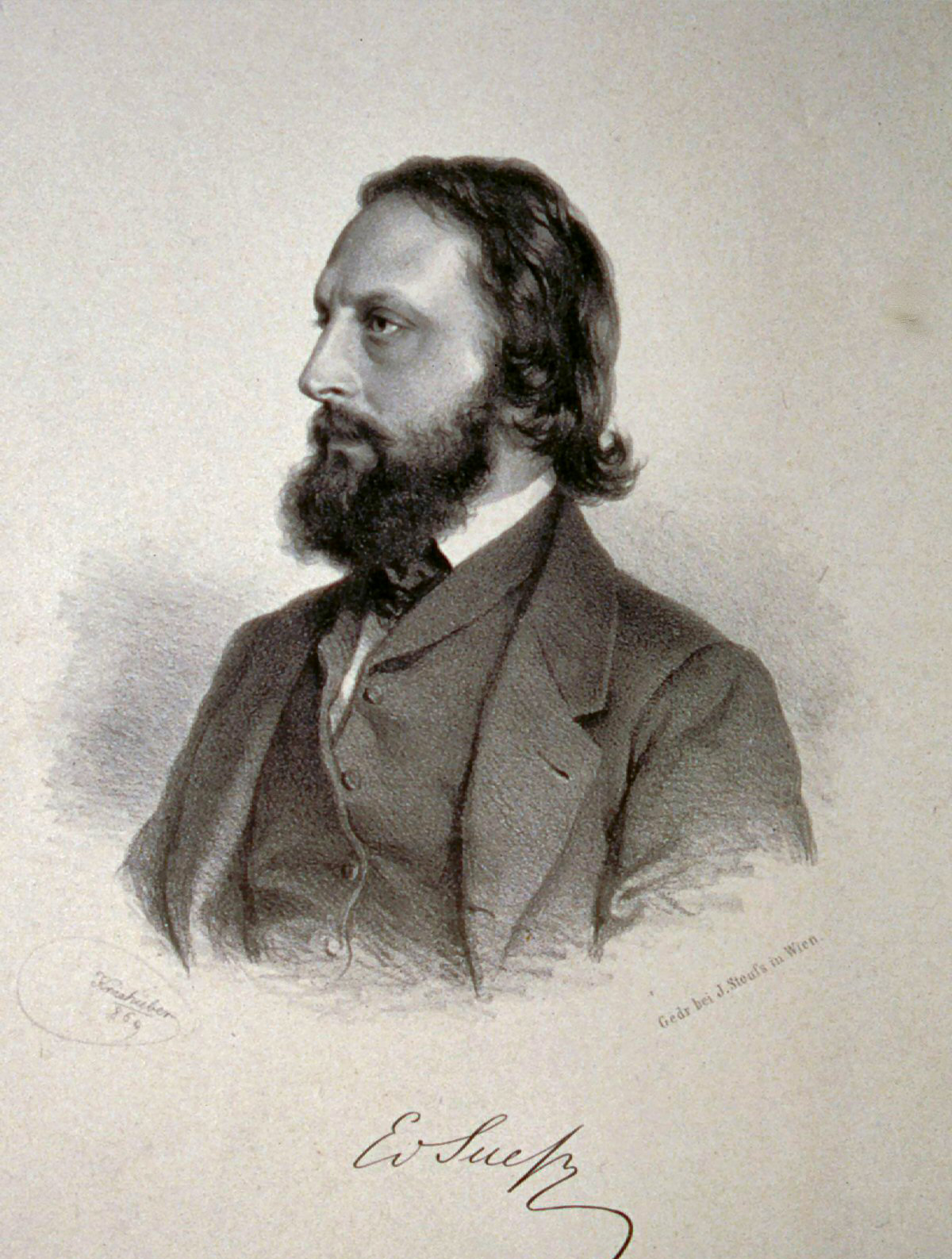
Eduard Suess

- April 1 – Rube Waddell, American baseball player and MLB Hall of Famer (b. 1876)
- April 2 – Paul Heyse, German writer, Nobel Prize laureate (b. 1830)
- April 7
  - Mohammad Ayyub Khan, Emir of Afghanistan (b. 1855)
  - Sui Sin Far, English-born writer (b. 1865)
- April 9 – Empress Shōken, consort of Emperor Meiji of Japan (b. 1849)
- April 11 – Elena Guerra, Italian Roman Catholic religious professed and blessed (b. 1835)
- April 15 – Count Frederick of Hohenau (b. 1857)
- April 16
  - George William Hill, American astronomer and mathematician (b. 1838)
  - Jacinta Parejo, Venezuelan public figure, First Lady of Venezuela (b. 1845)
- April 19 – Charles Sanders Peirce, American philosopher (b. 1839)
- April 24 – Benedict Menni, Italian Roman Catholic priest and saint (b. 1841)
- April 25 – Géza Fejérváry, 16th Prime Minister of Hungary (b. 1833)
- April 26 – Eduard Suess, Austrian geologist (b. 1831)
- April 28 – Philippe Édouard Léon Van Tieghem, French botanist (b. 1839)

=== May ===
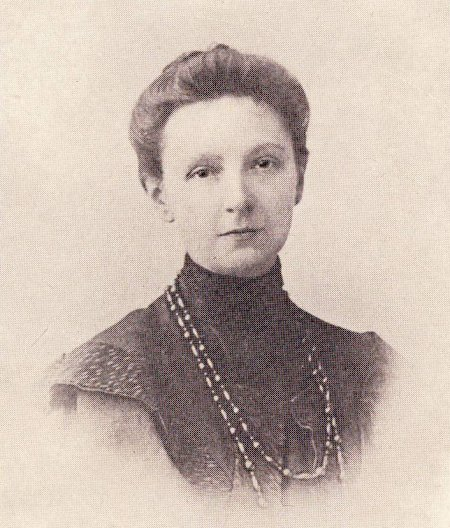
Élisabeth Leseur

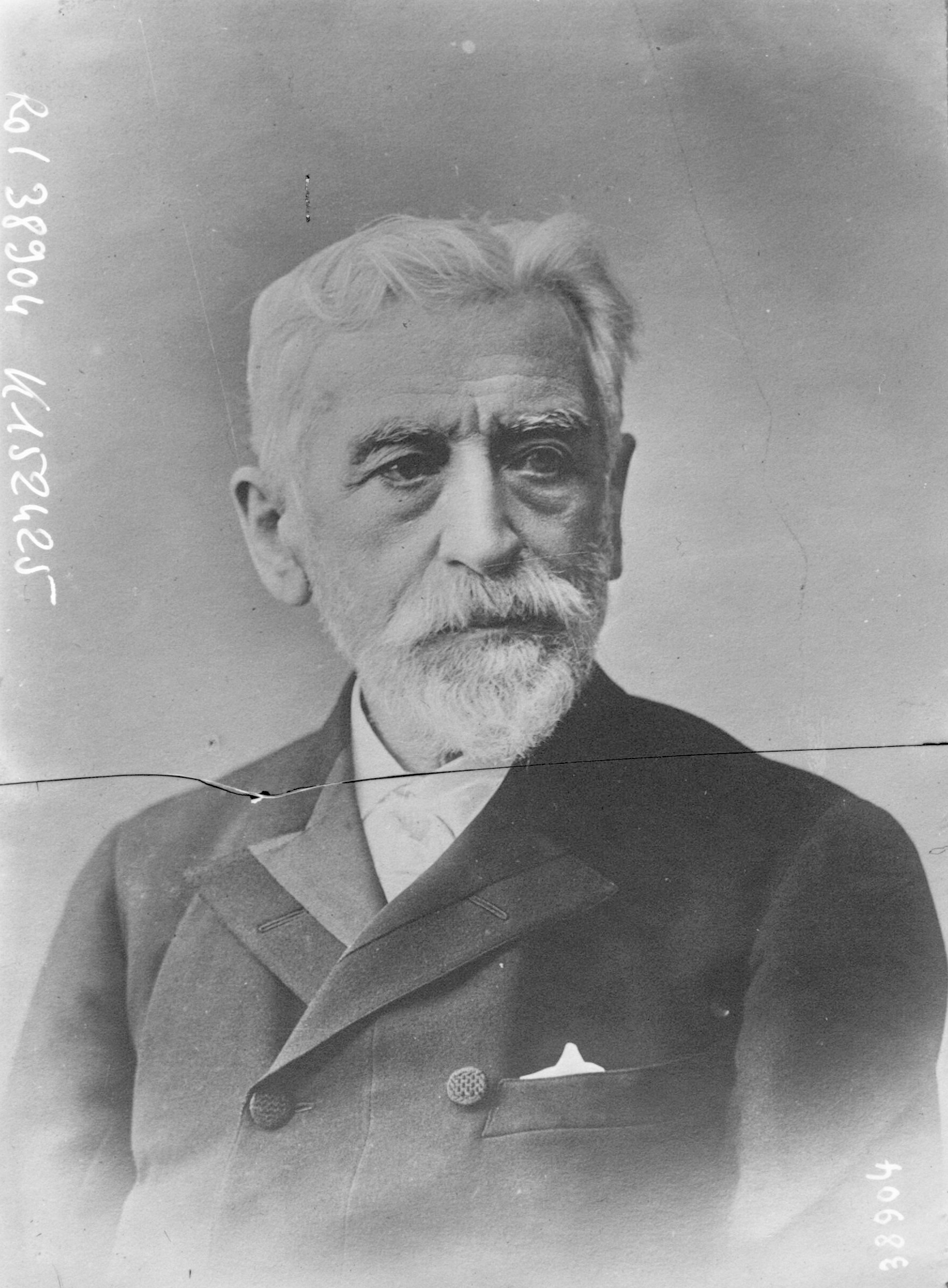
Eugenio Montero Ríos

- May 2 – John Campbell, 9th Duke of Argyll, husband of Princess Louise of the United Kingdom (b. 1845)
- May 3 – Élisabeth Leseur, French Roman Catholic mystic and servant of God (b. 1866)
- May 8 – Seth Edulji Dinshaw, Indian Parsi philanthropist (b. 1842)
- May 9 – C. W. Post, American cereal manufacturer (b. 1854)
- May 10 – Lillian Nordica, American opera singer (b. 1857)
- May 12 – Eugenio Montero Ríos, 29th Prime Minister of Spain (b. 1832)
- May 15 – Ida Freund, Austrian-born British chemist and educator (b. 1863)
- May 23 – William O'Connell Bradley, American politician from Kentucky (b. 1847)
- May 26 – Jacob Riis, Danish-American social reformer (b. 1849)
- May 27 – Sir Joseph Swan, British scientist (b. 1828)
- May 29 – Joseph Gérard, French Roman Catholic priest and blessed (b. 1831)

=== June ===
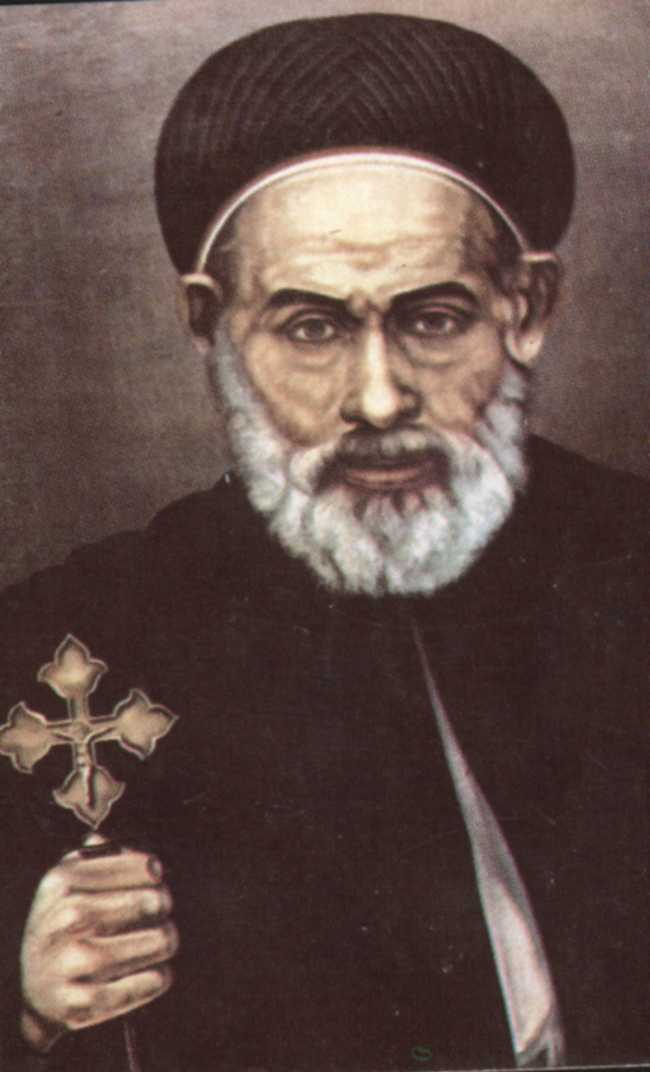
Abraam

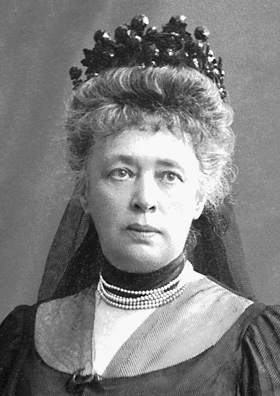
Bertha von Suttner

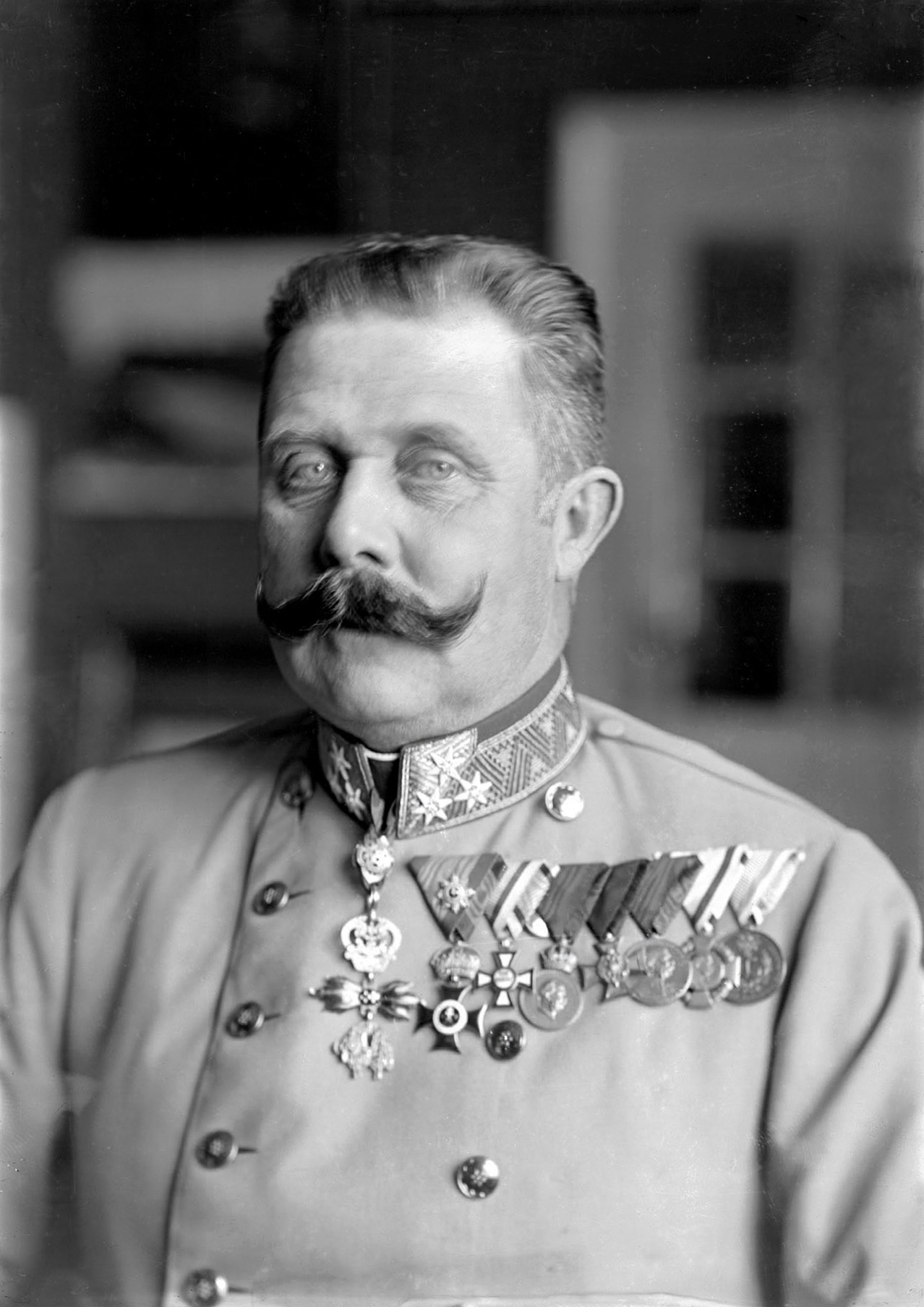
Archduke Franz Ferdinand of Austria

- June 10 – Abraam, Egyptian Coptic Orthodox bishop and saint (b. 1829)
- June 11 – Adolf Friedrich V, Grand Duke of Mecklenburg-Strelitz (b. 1848)
- June 14 – Adlai E. Stevenson I, 23rd Vice President of the United States (b. 1835)
- June 15 – John Robert Sitlington Sterrett, American classical scholar and archeologist (b. 1851)
- June 19 – Brandon Thomas, British actor and playwright (Charley's Aunt) (b. 1848)
- June 21 – Bertha von Suttner, Austrian writer and pacifist, recipient of the Nobel Peace Prize (b. 1843)
- June 22 – Princess Phannarai, Thai princess consort (b. 1838)
- June 25 – Georg II, Duke of Saxe-Meiningen (b. 1826)
- June 28 – Archduke Franz Ferdinand (b. 1863) and Sophie, Duchess of Hohenberg (b. 1868), both assassinated

=== July ===
- July 2 – Joseph Chamberlain, British politician (b. 1836)
- July 6 – Georges Legagneux, pioneer French aviator (b. 1882)
- July 9 – Prince Gustav of Thurn and Taxis (b. 1848)
- July 12 – Horace Harmon Lurton, Associate Justice of the United States Supreme Court (b. 1844)
- July 17 – Luis Uribe, Chilean naval hero (b. 1847)
- July 21 – Karl von Czyhlarz, Czech-born Austrian jurist and politician (b. 1833)
- July 23 – Vladimir Meshchersky, Russian journalist and novelist (b. 1839)
- July 29 – Pietro Pace, Maltese Roman Catholic bishop (b. 1831)
- July 31 – Jean Jaurès, French pacifist (assassinated) (b. 1859)

=== August ===
Roque Saenz Peña

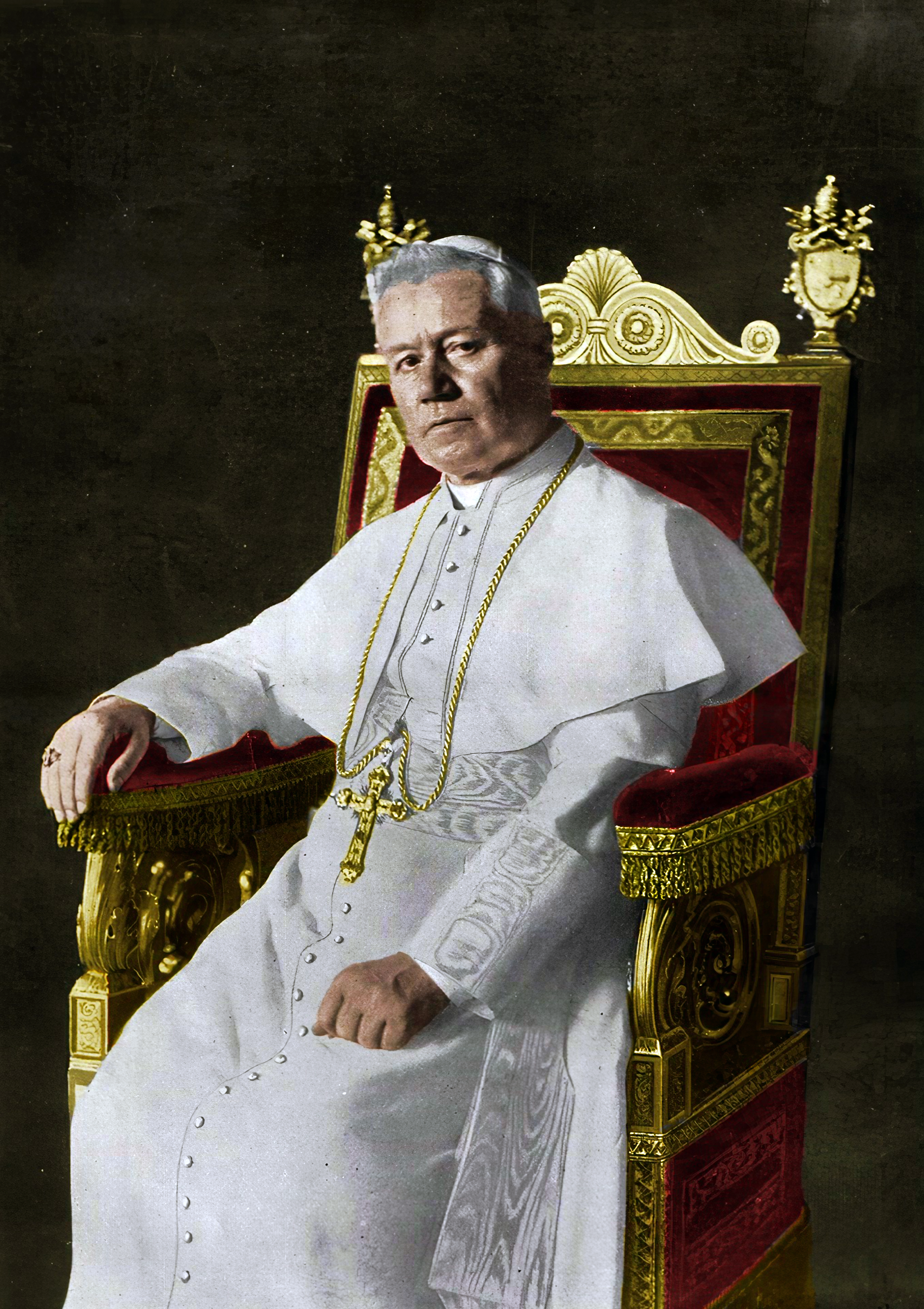
Pope Pius X

- August 4 – Hubertine Auclert, French feminist (b. 1848)
- August 6
  - Maxim Sandovich, Russian Orthodox priest, martyr and saint (b. 1888)
  - Ellen Axson Wilson, First Lady of the United States (b. 1860)
- August 8
  - Martin-Paul Samba, Cameroonian rebel leader (executed)
  - Rudolf Duala Manga Bell, Cameroonian resistance leader (executed)
- August 9 – Roque Sáenz Peña, 16th President of Argentina (b. 1851)
- August 12 – John Philip Holland, Irish developer of the submarine (b. 1840)
- August 15 – Adolfo Carranza, Argentine lawyer (b. 1857)
- August 17 – James Grierson, British general (b. 1859)
- August 19 – Franz Xavier Wernz, Superior general of the Society of Jesus, (b. 1842)
- August 20 – Pope Pius X (b. 1835)
- August 22 – Daniel Mercier, French footballer and soldier (b. 1892)
- August 23
  - Prince Friedrich of Saxe-Meiningen (b. 1861)
  - Robert Strange, American Episcopal bishop (b. 1857)
- August 26 – Achille Pierre Deffontaines, French general (died of wounds received in action) (b. 1858)
- August 27 – Eugen Böhm von Bawerk, Austrian economist (b. 1851)
- August 28 – Leberecht Maass, German admiral (killed in action) (b. 1863)
- August 30 – Alexander Samsonov, Russian general (suicide) (b. 1859)

=== September ===
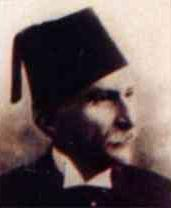
Mostafa Fahmy Pasha

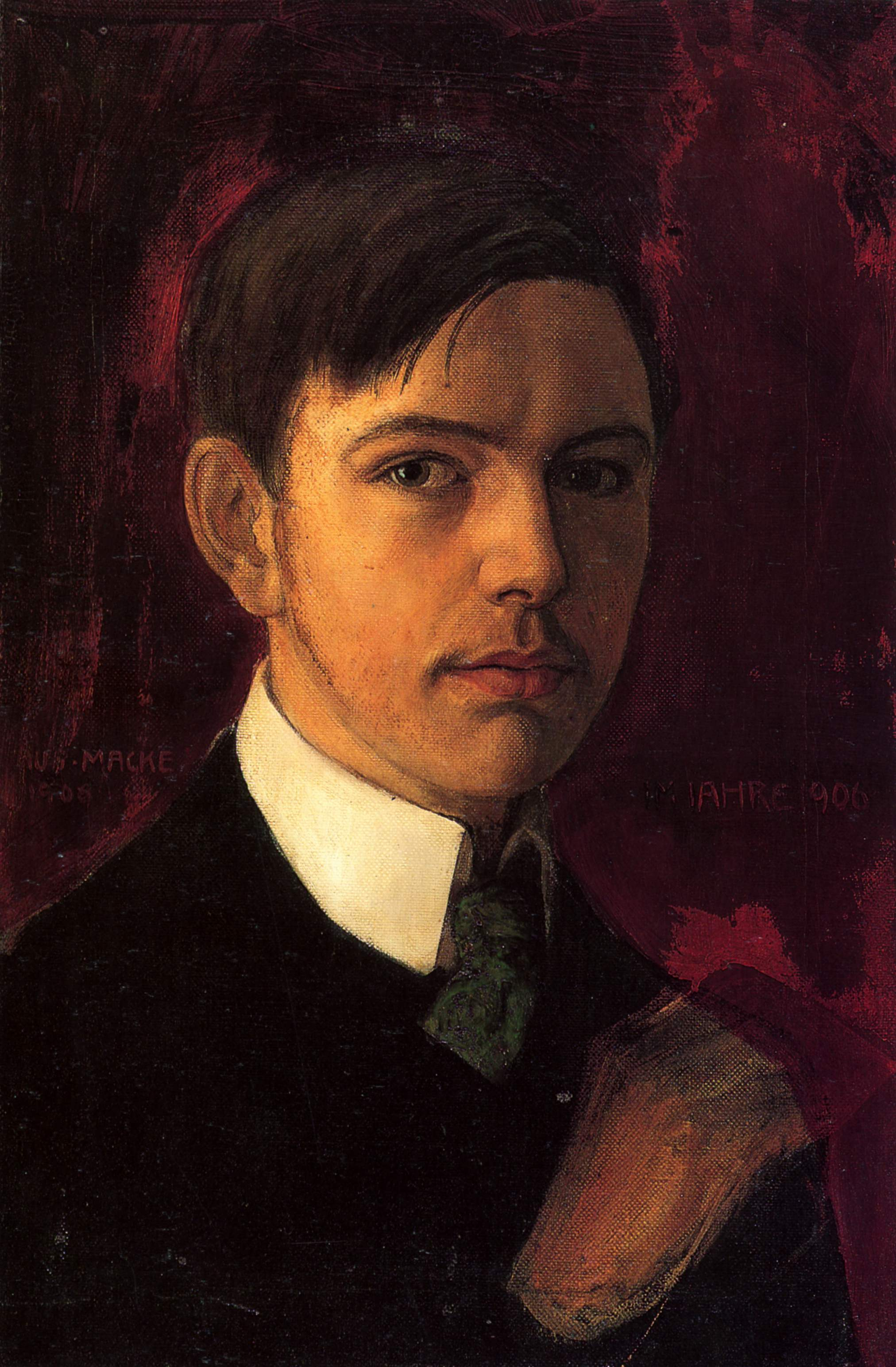
August Macke

- September 1 - Martha, the last Passenger pigeon died marking an endling (b. 1885)
- September 3 – Albéric Magnard, French composer (b. 1865)
- September 5 – Charles Péguy, French poet, essayist and editor (b. 1873)
- September 11
  - Mircea Demetriade, Romanian poet, playwright and actor (b. 1861)
  - Ismail Gasprinski, Crimean Tatar intellectual (b. 1851)
- September 13 – Mostafa Fahmy Pasha, Egyptian politician, 7th Prime Minister of Egypt (b. 1840)
- September 14 – Nicolás Zamora, Filipino Methodist minister and bishop (b. 1875)
- September 15 – Koos de la Rey, Boer general (b. 1847)
- September 16 – C. X. Larrabee, American businessman (b. 1843)
- September 22 – Alain-Fournier, French writer (killed in action) (b. 1886)
- September 26 – August Macke, German painter (killed in action) (b. 1887)
- September 28 – Richard Warren Sears, American founder of Sears, Roebuck and Company (b. 1863)

=== October ===
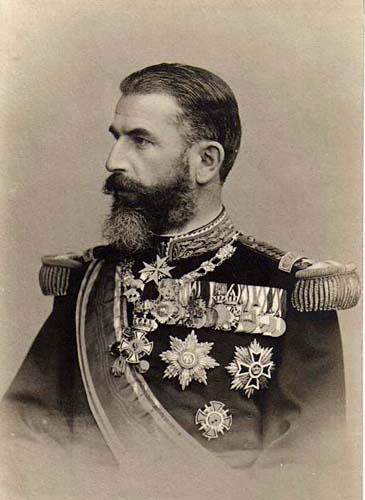
Carol I of Romania

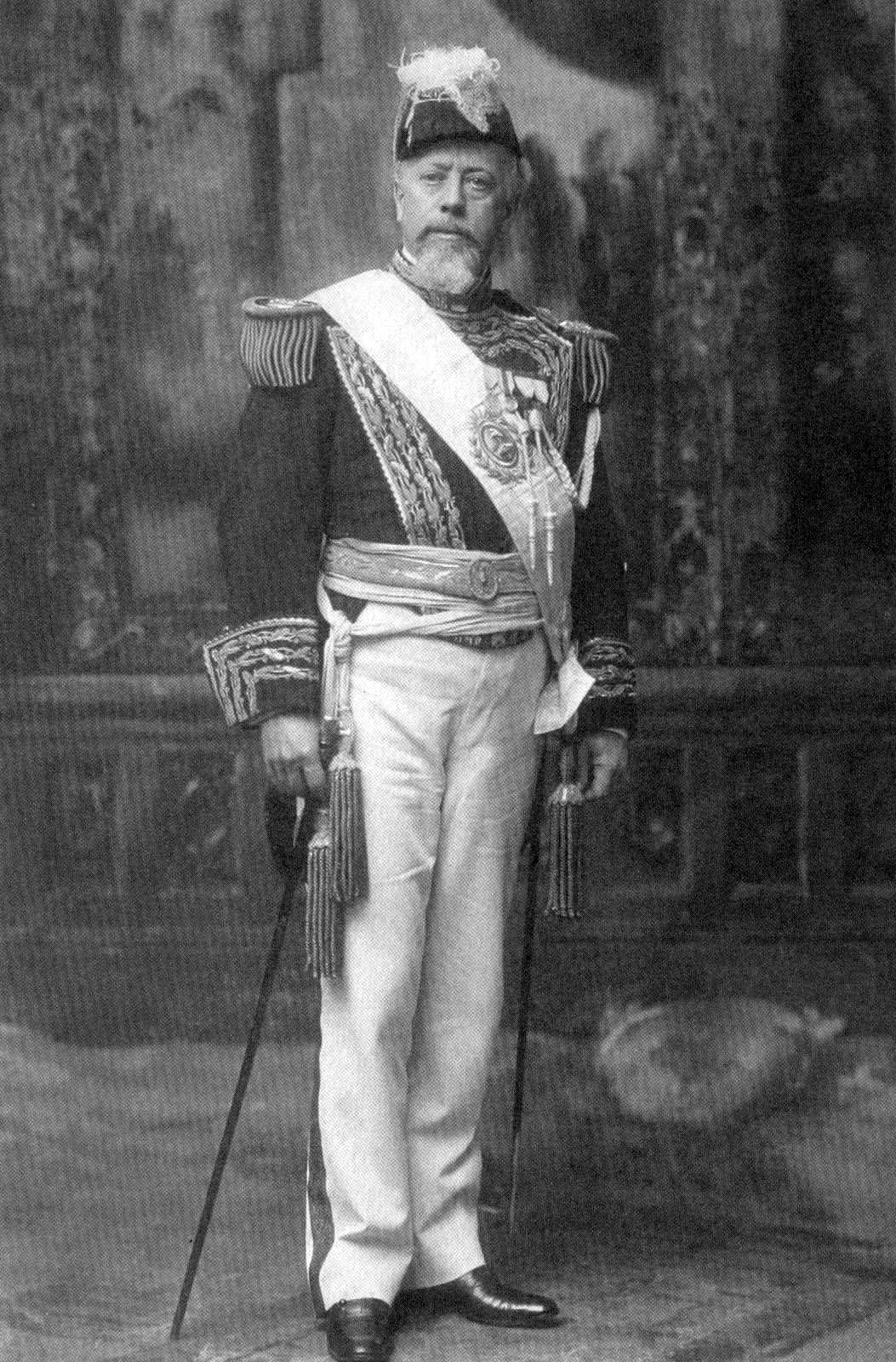
Julio Argentino Roca

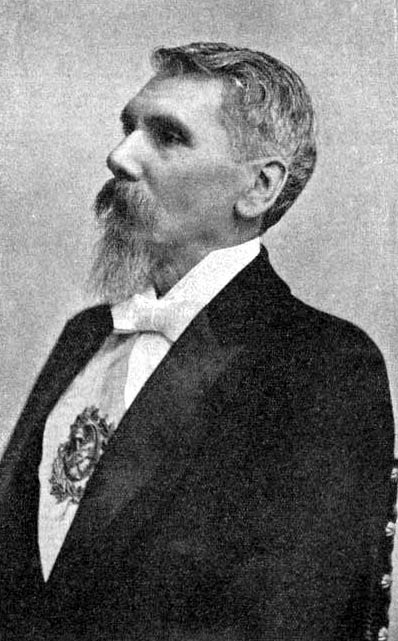
José Evaristo Uriburu

- October 1 – Kitty Lange Kielland, Norwegian painter (b. 1843)
- October 10 – King Carol I of Romania (b. 1839)
- October 12 – Prince Oleg Konstantinovich of Russia (b. 1892)
- October 16
  - Victor Arnold, Austrian actor (b. 1873)
  - Antonino Paternò Castello, Marchese di San Giuliano, Italian diplomat (b. 1852)
- October 17
  - Adolfo Saldias, Argentine historian, lawyer, politician, soldier and diplomat (b. 1849)
  - Prince Wolrad of Waldeck and Pyrmont (b. 1892)
- October 19 – Julio Argentino Roca, Argentine general and statesman, 2-time President of Argentina (b. 1843)
- October 21 – Dimitrie Sturdza, 4-time Prime Minister of Romania (b. 1833)
- October 23 – José Evaristo Uriburu, Argentine politician, 12th President of Argentina (b. 1831)
- October 24 – Yevgeniya Mravina, Russian soprano (b. 1864)
- October 27 – Prince Maurice of Battenberg (b. 1891)
- October 28
  - Princess Adelgunde of Bavaria (b. 1823)
  - Federico Peliti, Italian baker (b. 1844)

=== November ===
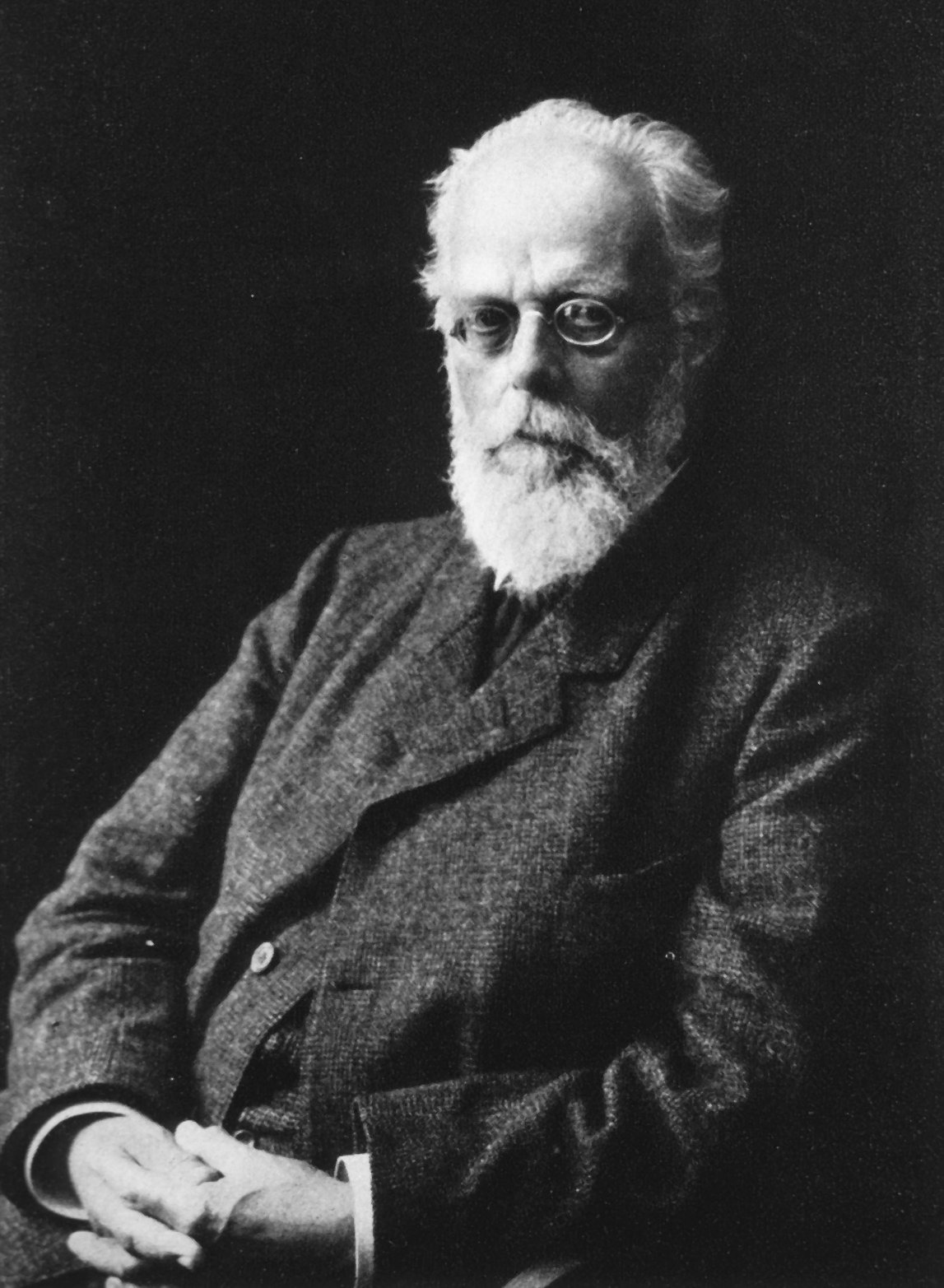
August Weismann

- November 1 – Sir Christopher Cradock, British admiral (killed in action) (b. 1862)
- November 3 – Georg Trakl, Austrian poet (suicide) (b. 1887)
- November 5 – August Weismann, German evolutionary biologist (b. 1834)
- November 9 – Princess Therese of Saxe-Altenburg (b. 1836)
- November 14 – Frederick Roberts, 1st Earl Roberts, British field marshal (b. 1832)
- November 17 – Sattar Khan, Iranian constitutional reformer and national hero (b. 1866)
- November 21 – Thaddeus C. Pound, American businessman and politician (b. 1832)
- November 22 – Charles Berlitz, American author (d. 2003)
- November 28 – Johann Wilhelm Hittorf, German physicist (b. 1824)

=== December ===
- December 1 – Alfred Thayer Mahan, United States Navy admiral, geostrategist and historian (b. 1840)
- December 8 – Maximilian von Spee, German admiral (killed in action) (b. 1861)
- December 14 – Giovanni Sgambati, Italian pianist and composer (b. 1841)
- December 16 – Ivan Zajc, Croatian composer (b. 1832)
- December 24 – John Muir, American naturalist (b. 1838)

=== Date unknown ===
- Jehandad Khan, Afghan emir (executed)

== Nobel Prizes ==

- Physics – Max von Laue
- Chemistry – Theodore William Richards
- Medicine – Róbert Bárány
- Literature – not awarded
- Peace – not awarded
