= Rathausplatz, Vienna =

Square in Vienna, Austria

Coordinates: 48.2106°N 16.3587°E

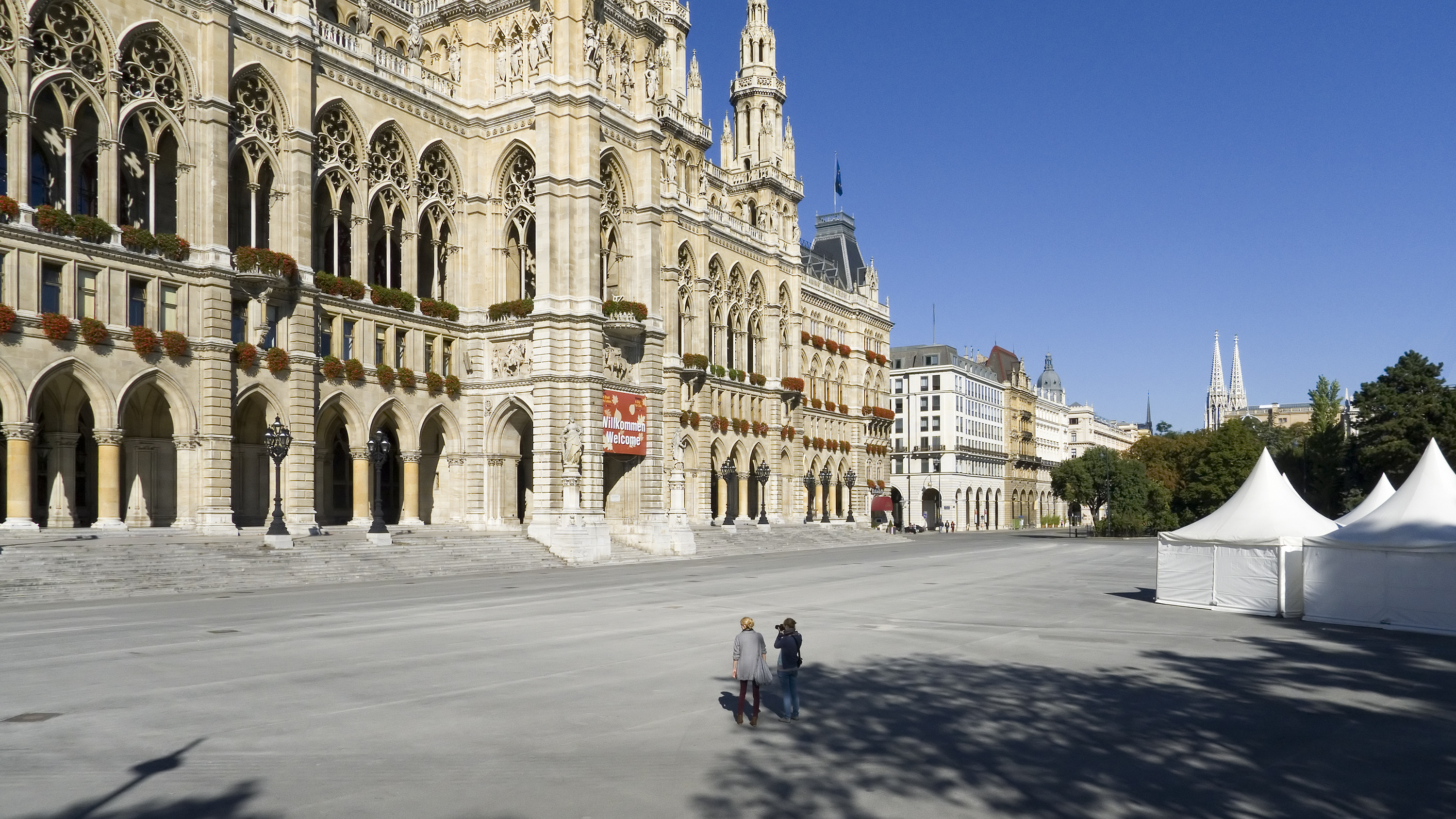
The inner Rathausplatz

The Rathausplatz is a square in Vienna's first district, the Innere Stadt, in front of the Rathaus. It is surrounded by the Rathauspark and the Ringstrasse.

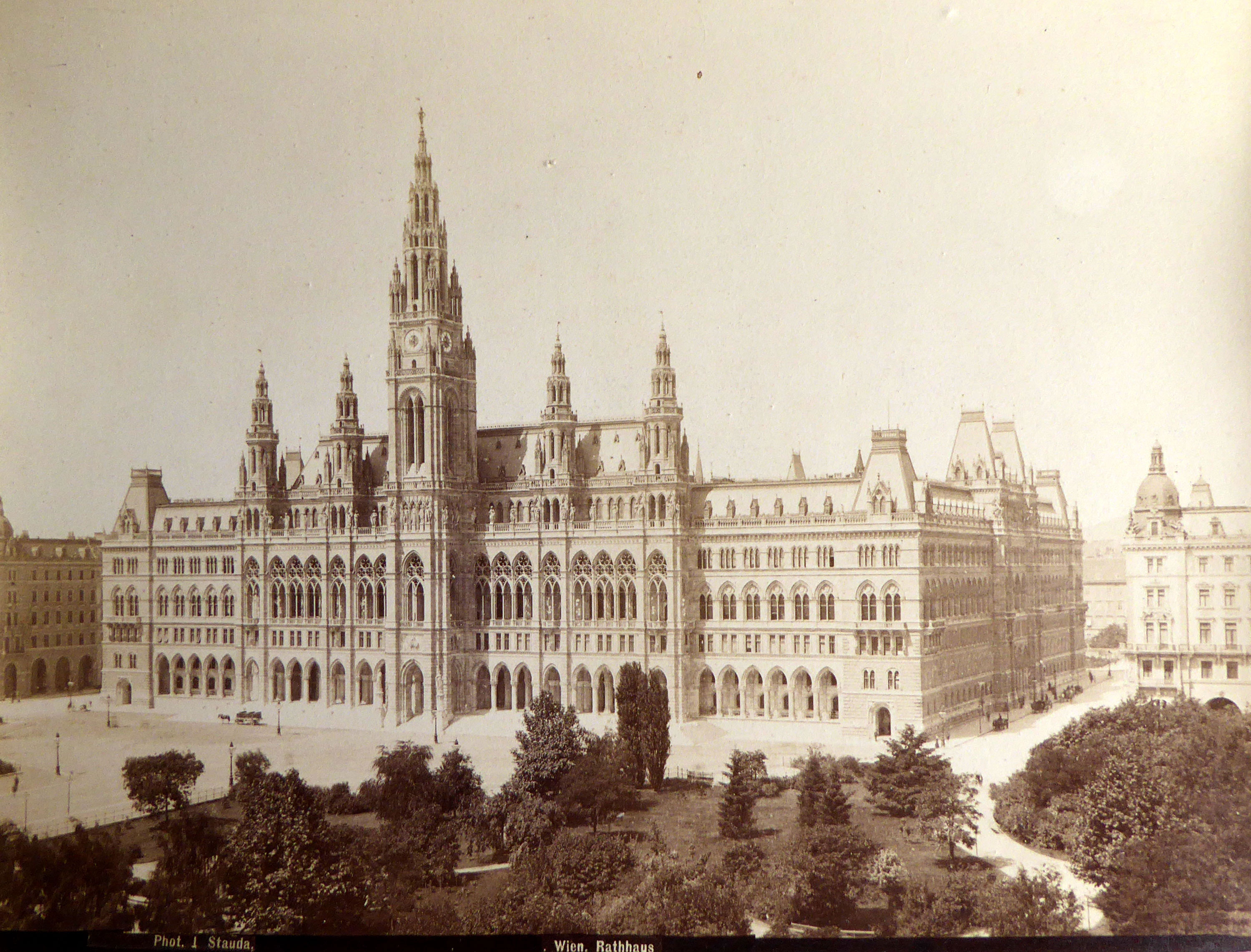
The Rathaus in 1885

== History ==
The area now known as Rathausplatz was originally part of the Josefstädter Glacis, an open grassland in front of Vienna’s city walls, maintained as a defensive field. In the 19th century, it served as a parade and drill ground for the imperial army. Following the commencement of the construction of the RIngstraße in 1858, the site remained under military control for several years. However, after prolonged negotiations led by Mayor Cajetan Felder, the army relinquished its claim, allowing the City Expansion Fund to develop an urban plan for the area. During this period, various alternative locations for the new city hall were considered.

Ultimately, the square was designated as the largest open space along the Ringstraße. In 1872–1873, the northern and southern sections of the square were transformed into the Rathauspark, designed by gardener Rudolph Siebeck, while the central axis between the Rathaus and the Burgtheater was preserved as an open space. The foundation stone for the city hall was laid in 1873, with construction beginning the following year, opposite the Burgtheater on Franzensring (now Universitätsring). At the same time, work began on the Parliament, located on the southern border of the square, followed a few years later by the construction of the main building of the University of Vienna on the northern side of Rathausplatz.

Over time, the Rathausplatz underwent four name changes. Established in 1870, it was renamed Dr.-Karl-Lueger-Platz in 1907 after the then-mayor. Following the rise of Red Vienna in 1919, this was deemed inappropriate due to Lueger’s opposition to universal suffrage and his political stances. Consequently, the privately funded Lueger Monument was not placed on the Rathausplatz as originally intended but was instead installed in 1926 at an unnamed square at Wollzeile/Stubenring, which was subsequently named Dr.-Karl-Lueger-Platz. The Rathausplatz then regained its original name. In 1938, it was briefly renamed Adolf-Hitler-Platz, a change that was reversed on 30 April 1945 following Vienna's liberation from Nazi Germany.

== Use ==
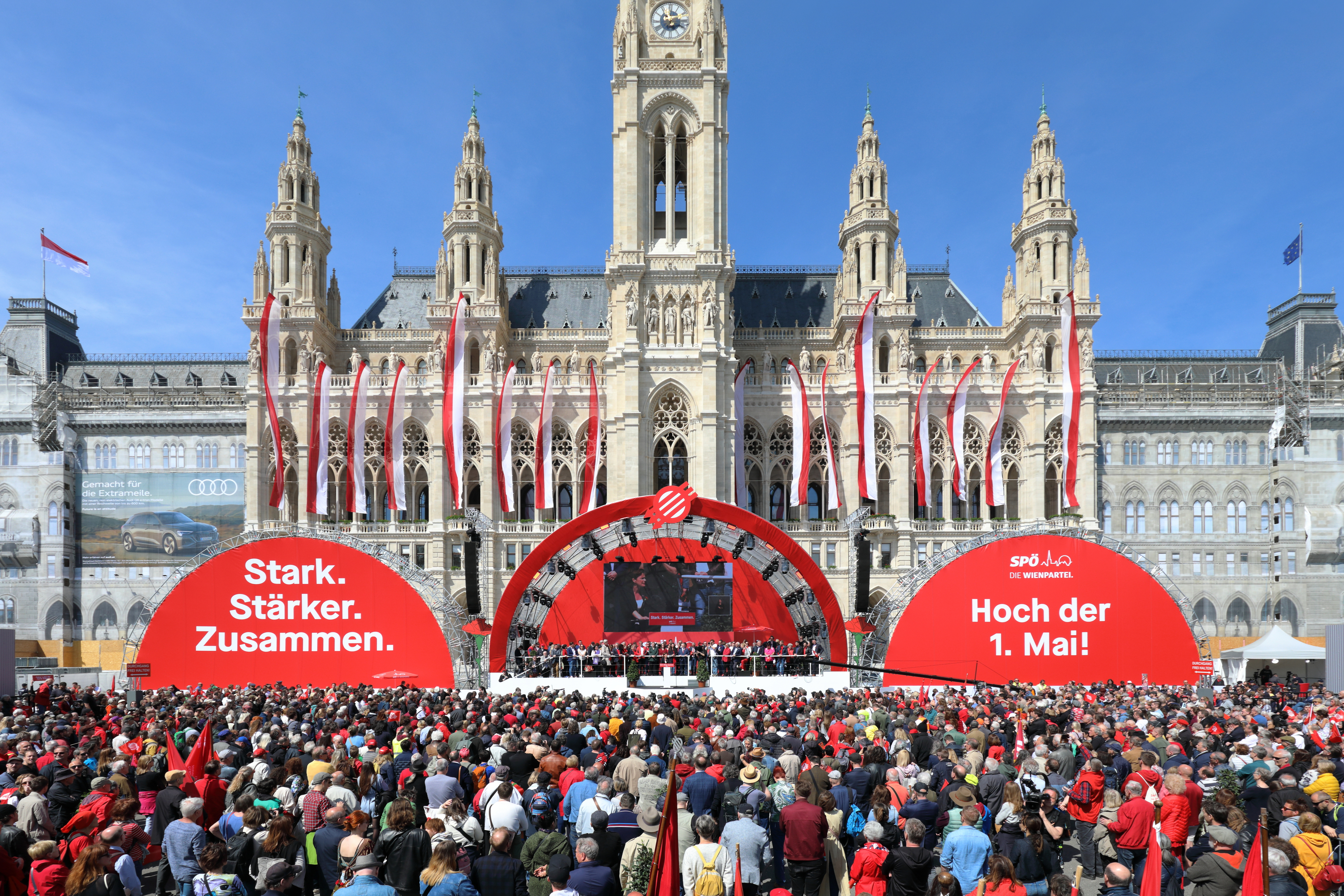
Labour Day parade

The square has historically been used for political rallies. Since 1921, the traditional Labour Day rally of the Social Democratic Party (SPÖ) has been held on the Rathausplatz, although it was interrupted between 1933 and 1945.

Notable events include the Christkindlmarkt (Christmas market) in November and December, the Wiener Eistraum, a temporary ice-rink in January and February, the opening of the Wiener Festwochen (Vienna Festival) in May, and open-air cinema screenings featuring classical music in July and August. The Life Ball, hosted at the Vienna City Hall, also took place in the square.

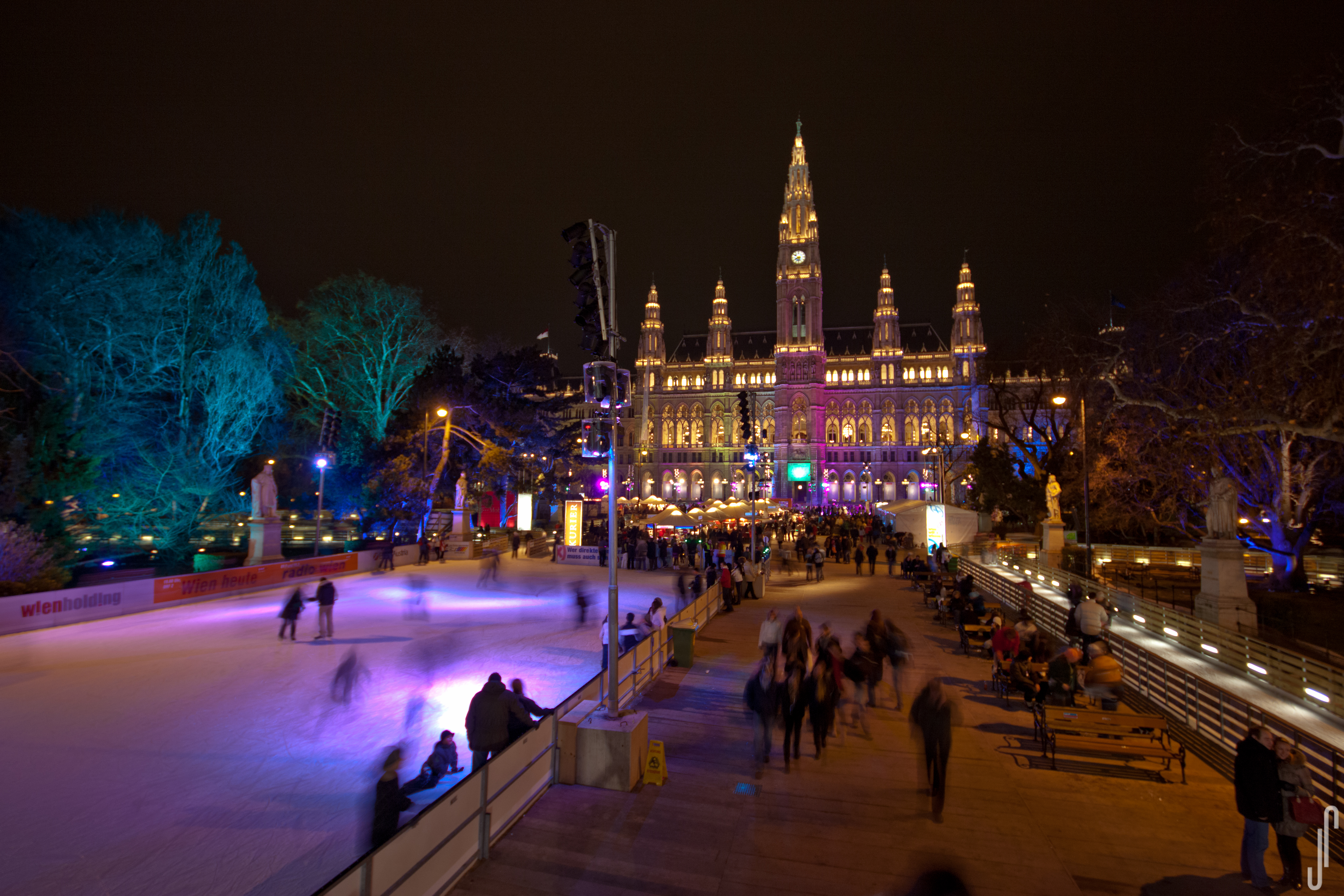
Wiener Eistraum

A longstanding tradition since 1959 is the annual Christmas tree, which is erected as a gift from one of Austria's states to the capital city.

== Features ==
The Rathauspark, consisting of two parks divided by the road leading from the Ring to the Rathaus, was established in 1873. The creation of the park was commissioned by Mayor Cajetan Felder and designed by city gardener Rudolph Siebeck.

On either side of the road from the Ring to the Rathaus stand four stone monuments, erected in 1902. These monuments were originally placed on the Elisabethbrücke (which crossed the Wien until it was torn down), before being relocated. These statues are:

On the left:

- Henry II, Margrave of Austria: A key figure in the expansion of the Babenberg dynasty.
- Ernst Rüdiger von Starhemberg: A military leader, known for his defense of Vienna during the second Ottoman siege of 1683.
- Duke Rudolf the Founder: Founder of the Habsburg dynasty in Austria, known for his role in establishing Habsburg rule.
- Johann Bernhard Fischer von Erlach: A renowned Austrian Baroque architect, known for designing many of Vienna’s iconic buildings, including the Karlskirche.

On the right:

- Duke Leopold the Glorious: A 13th-century ruler of Austria, recognized for his military campaigns and contributions to the expansion of the Habsburg lands.
- Nicholas, Count of Salm: A military commander who led the defence of the city during the first Ottoman siege of 1592, during which he died.
- Archbishop Leopold Karl von Kollonitsch: A leading figure of the Hungarian Counter-Reformation.
- Joseph von Sonnenfels: A philosopher, jurist, and novelist of the Enlightenment, known for his work in law and advocacy for reform under Maria Theresia.

Two further statues face the square from the park: one is a memorial to Karl Seitz, the first president of Austria, who later became mayor, and the other to Theodor Körner, who served as mayor before becoming president of the country.

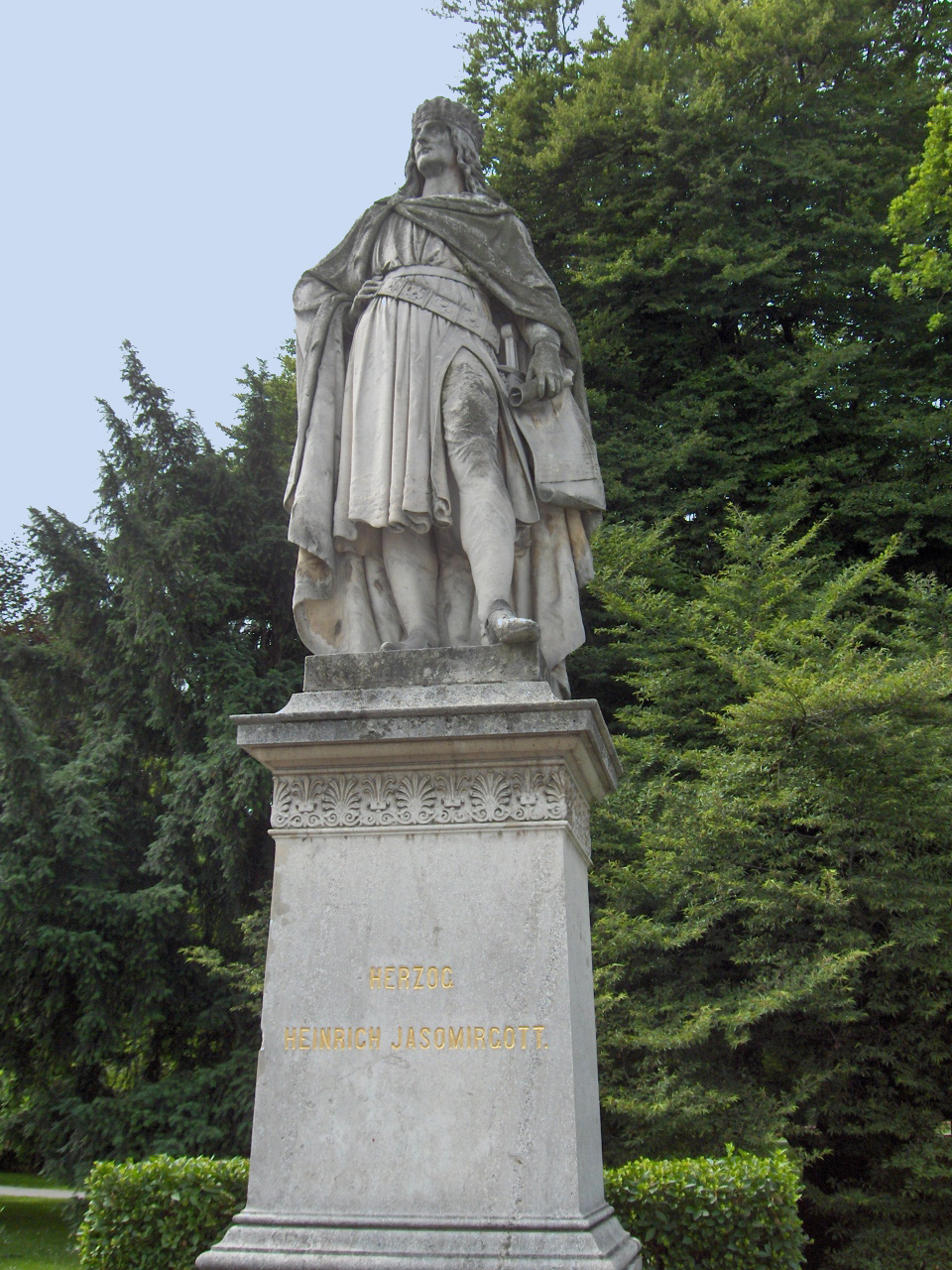
Henry II, Jasomirgott

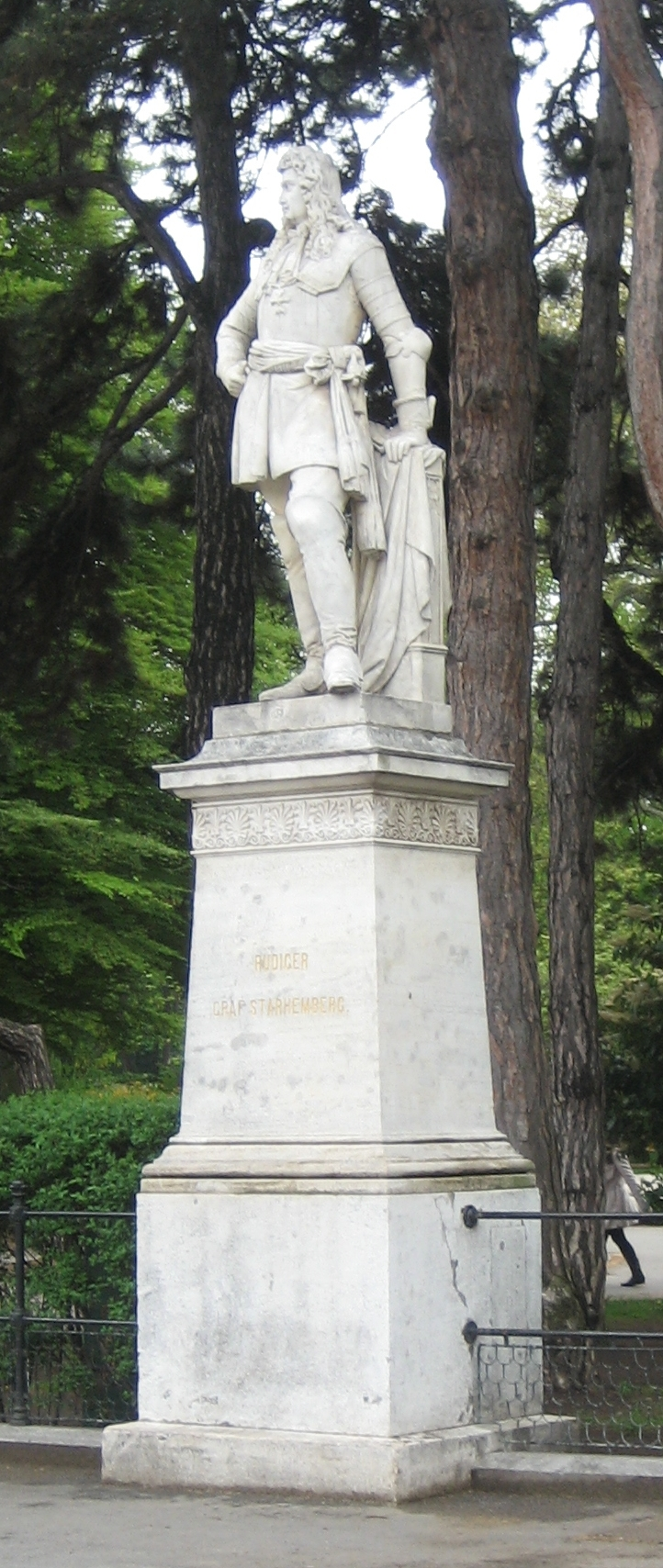
Ernst Rüdiger von Starhemberg

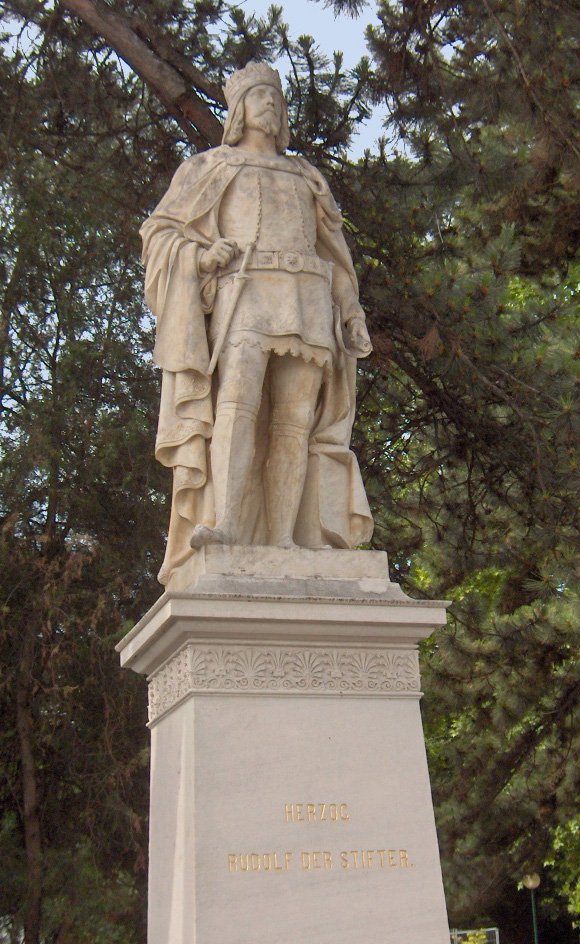
Rudolf IV, the Founder

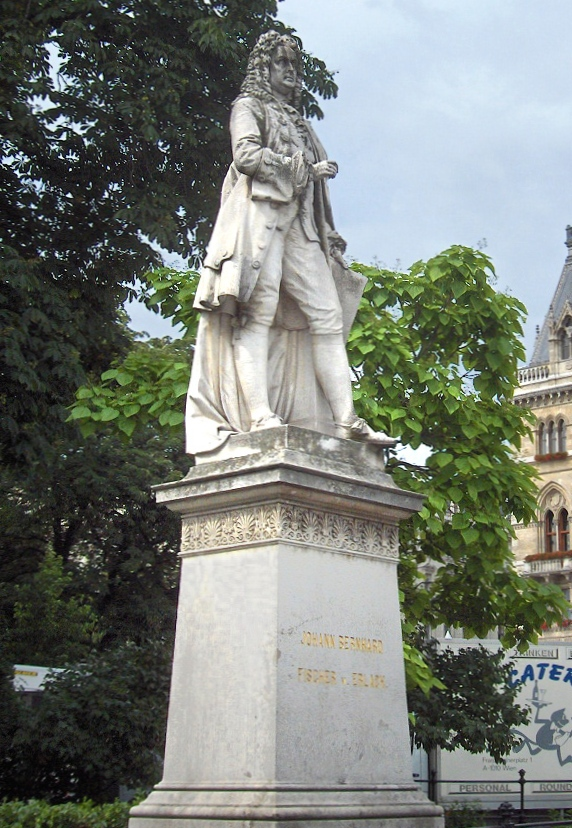
Johann Bernhard Fischer von Erlach

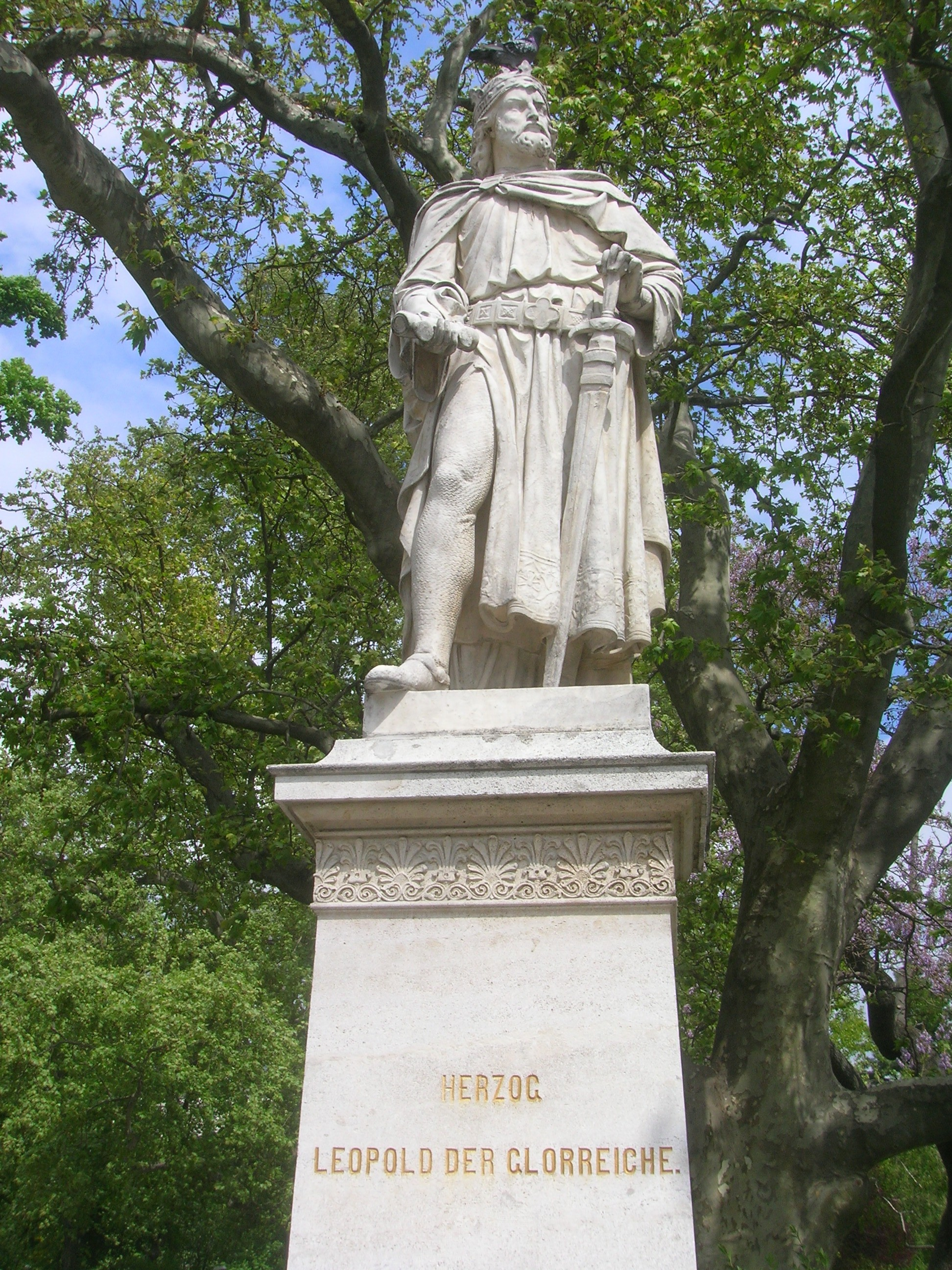
Duke Leopold the Glorious

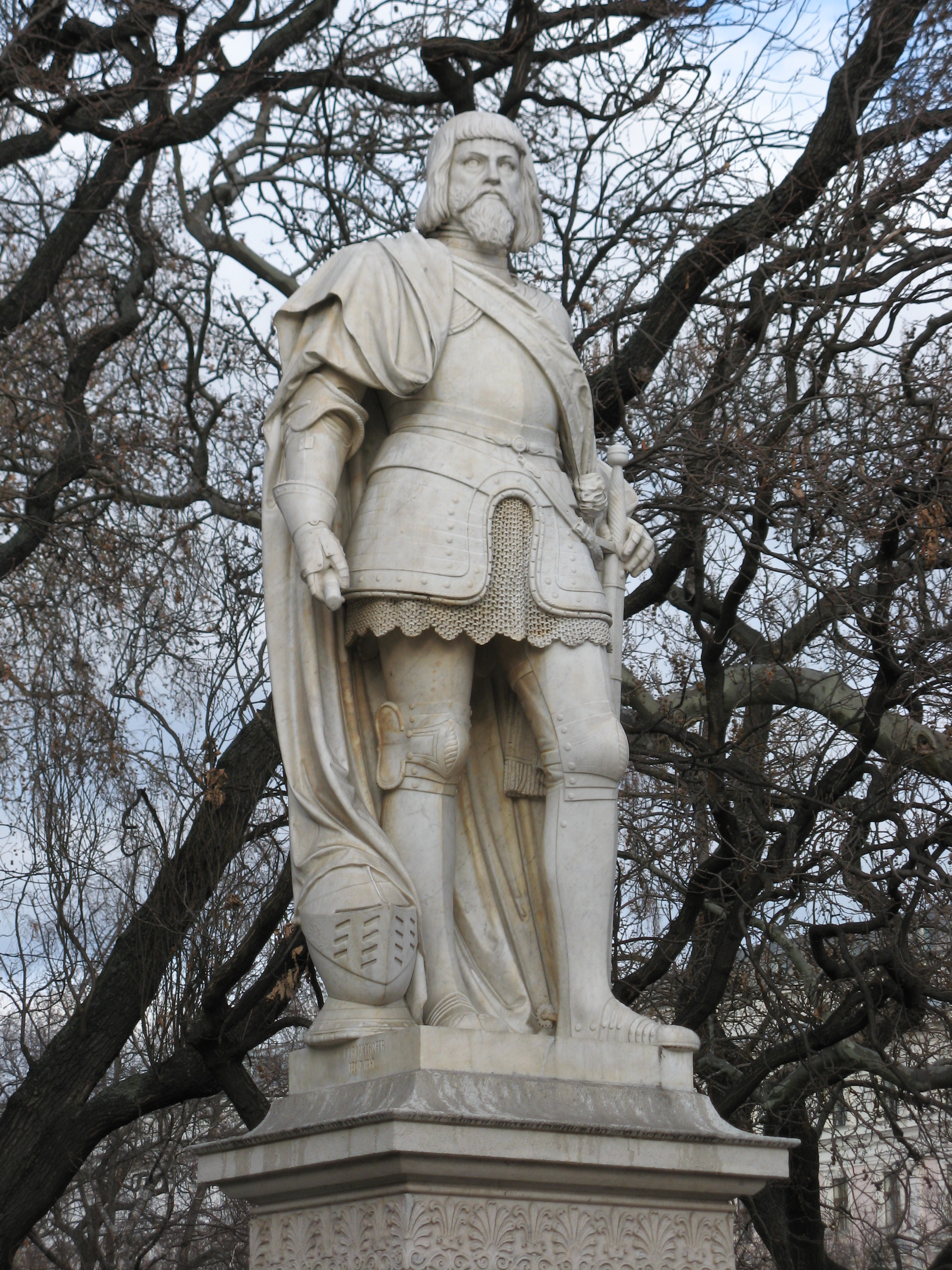
Nicholas, Count of Salm

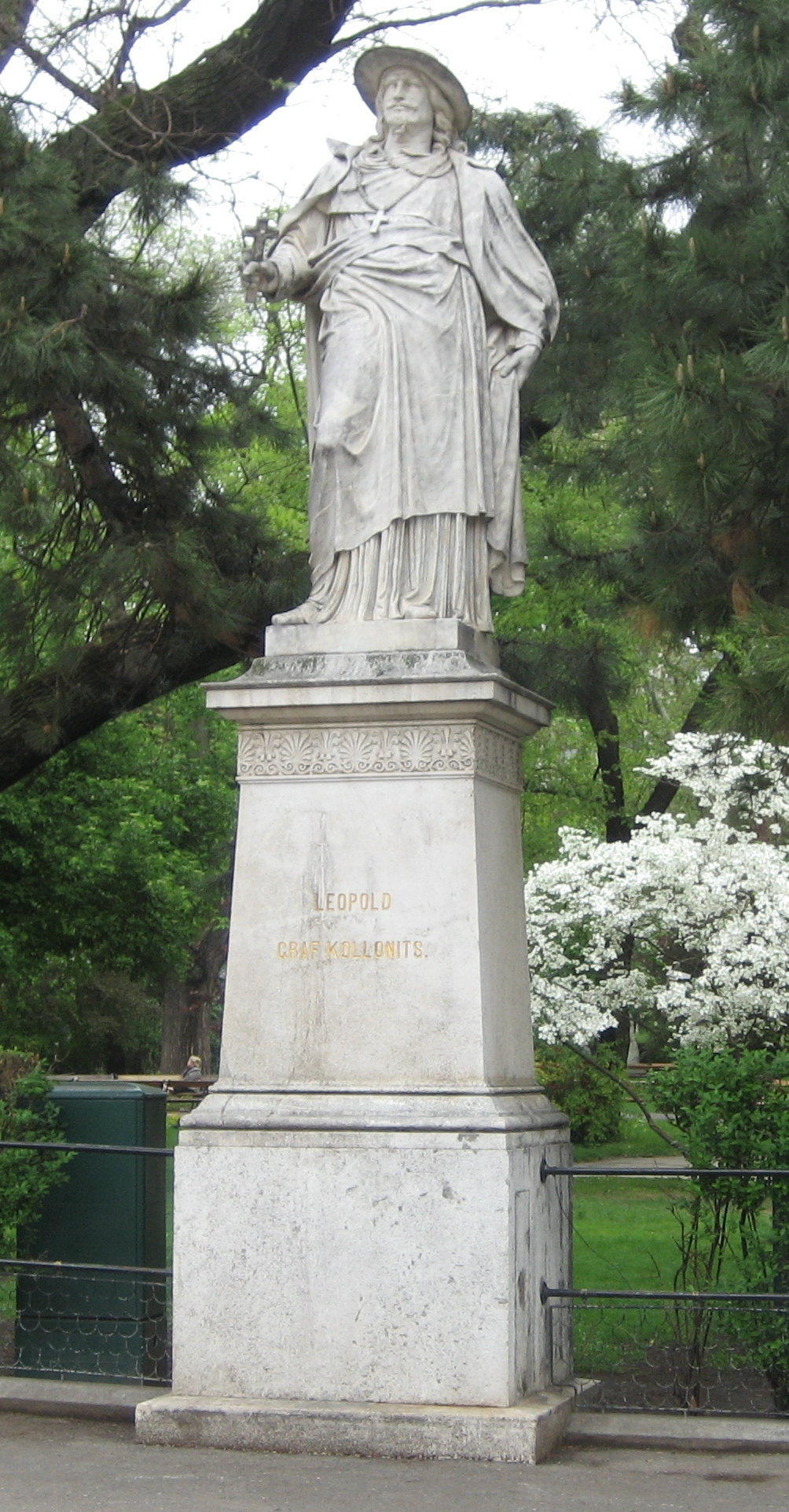
Archbishop Leopold Karl von Kollonits

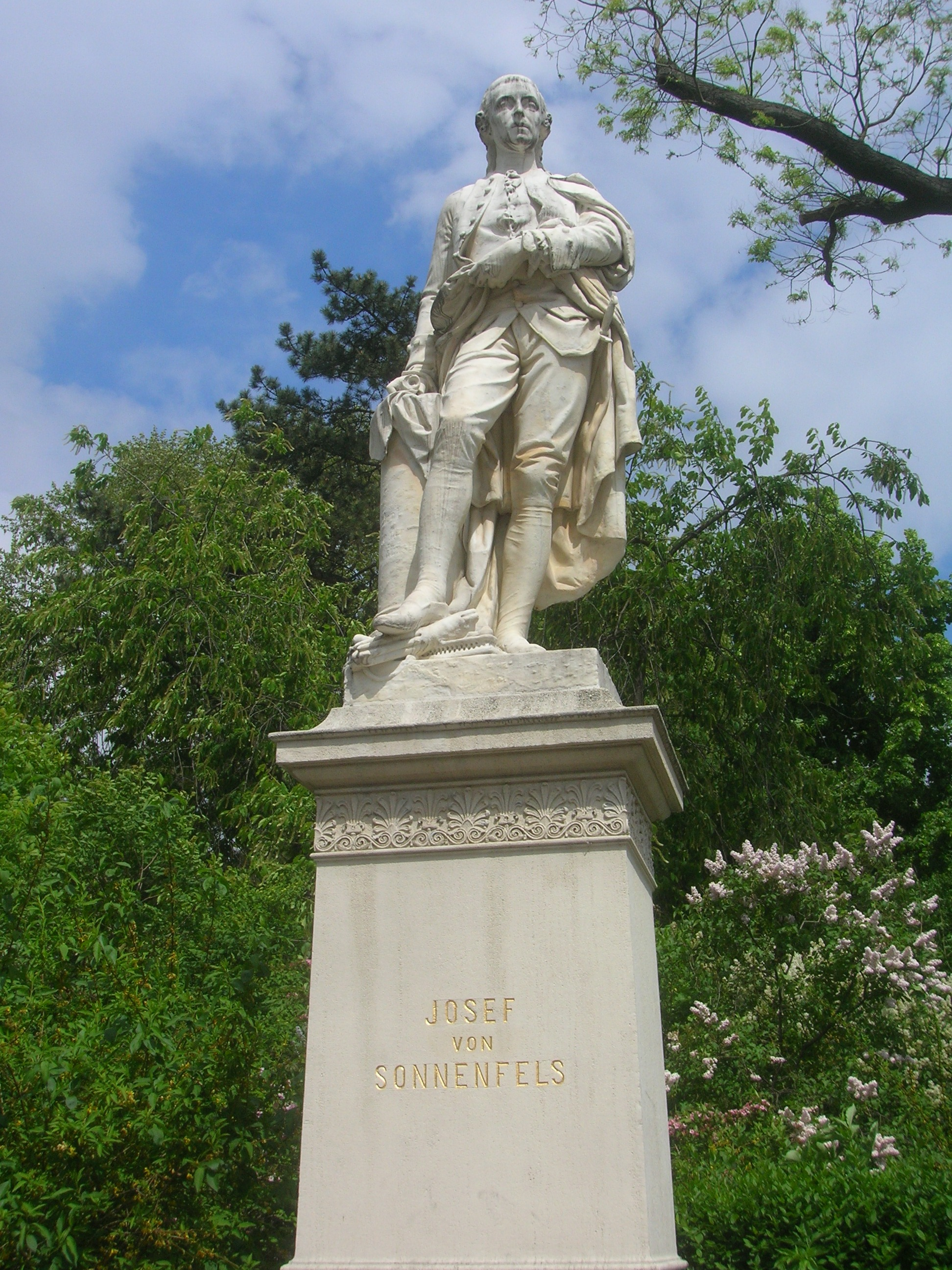
Joseph von Sonnenfels

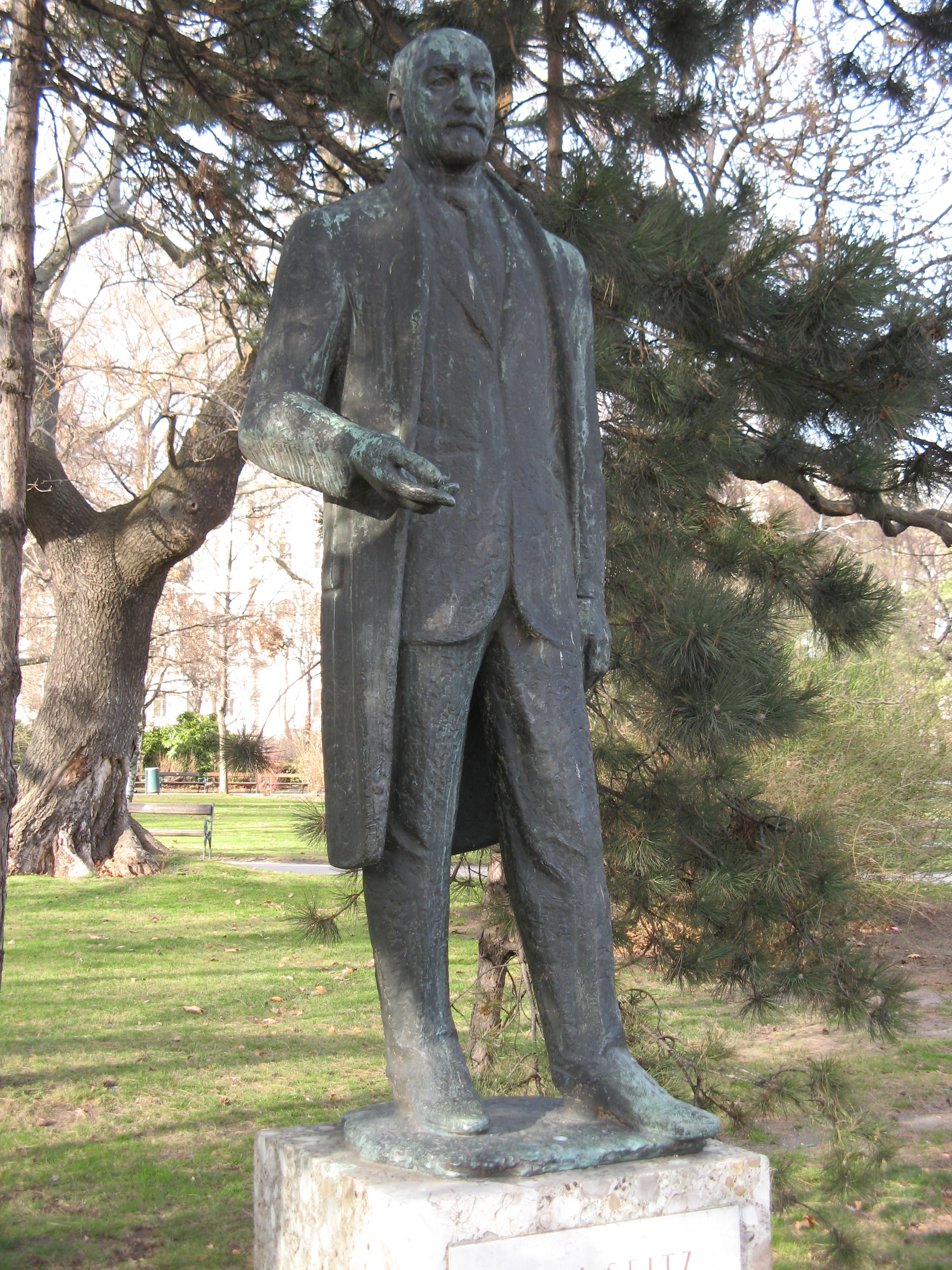
Karl Seitz

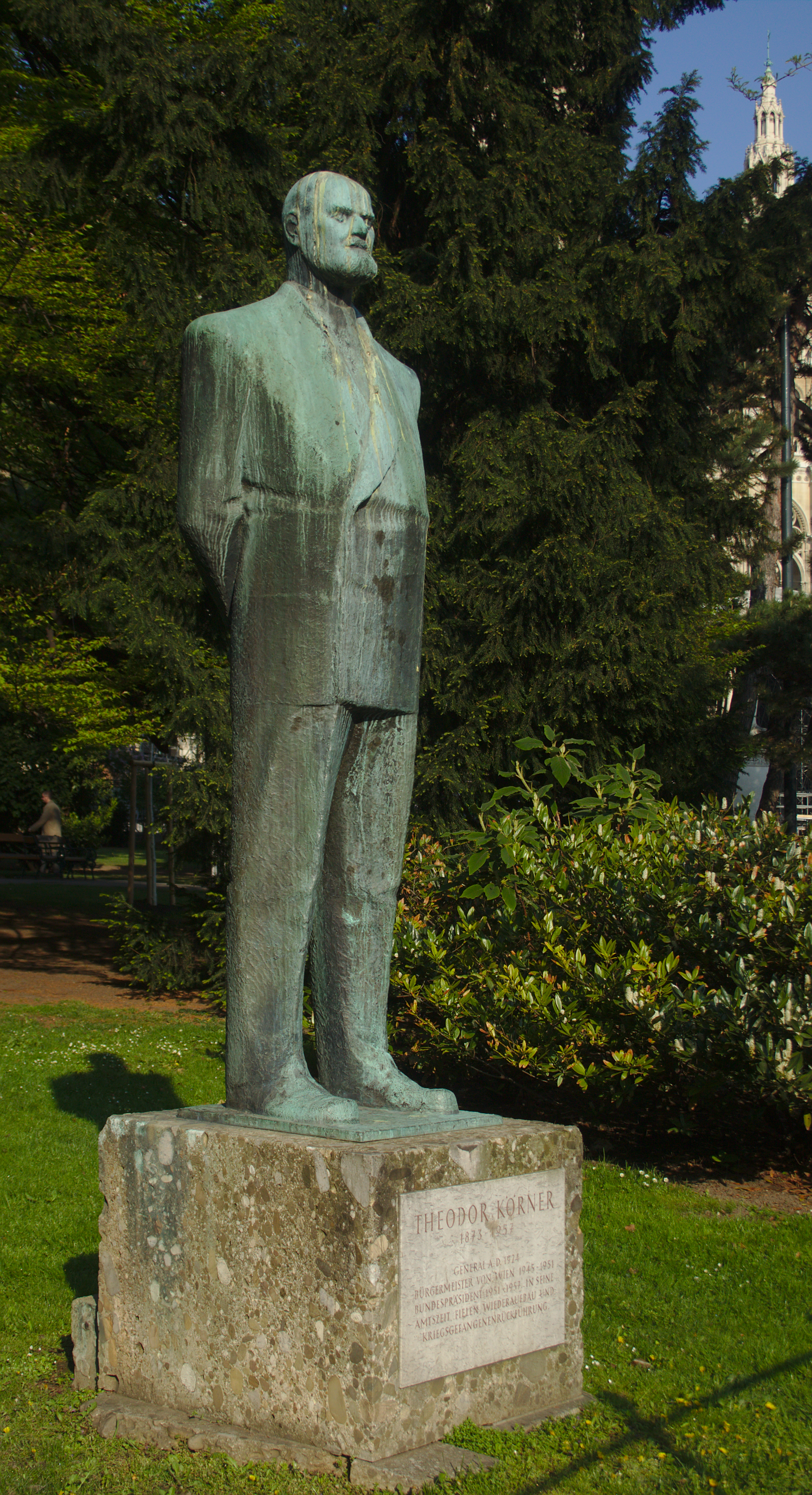
Theodor Körner
