= Main building (University of Vienna) =

University building in Vienna, Austria

Main Building of the University of Vienna
- Hauptgebäude der Universität Wien
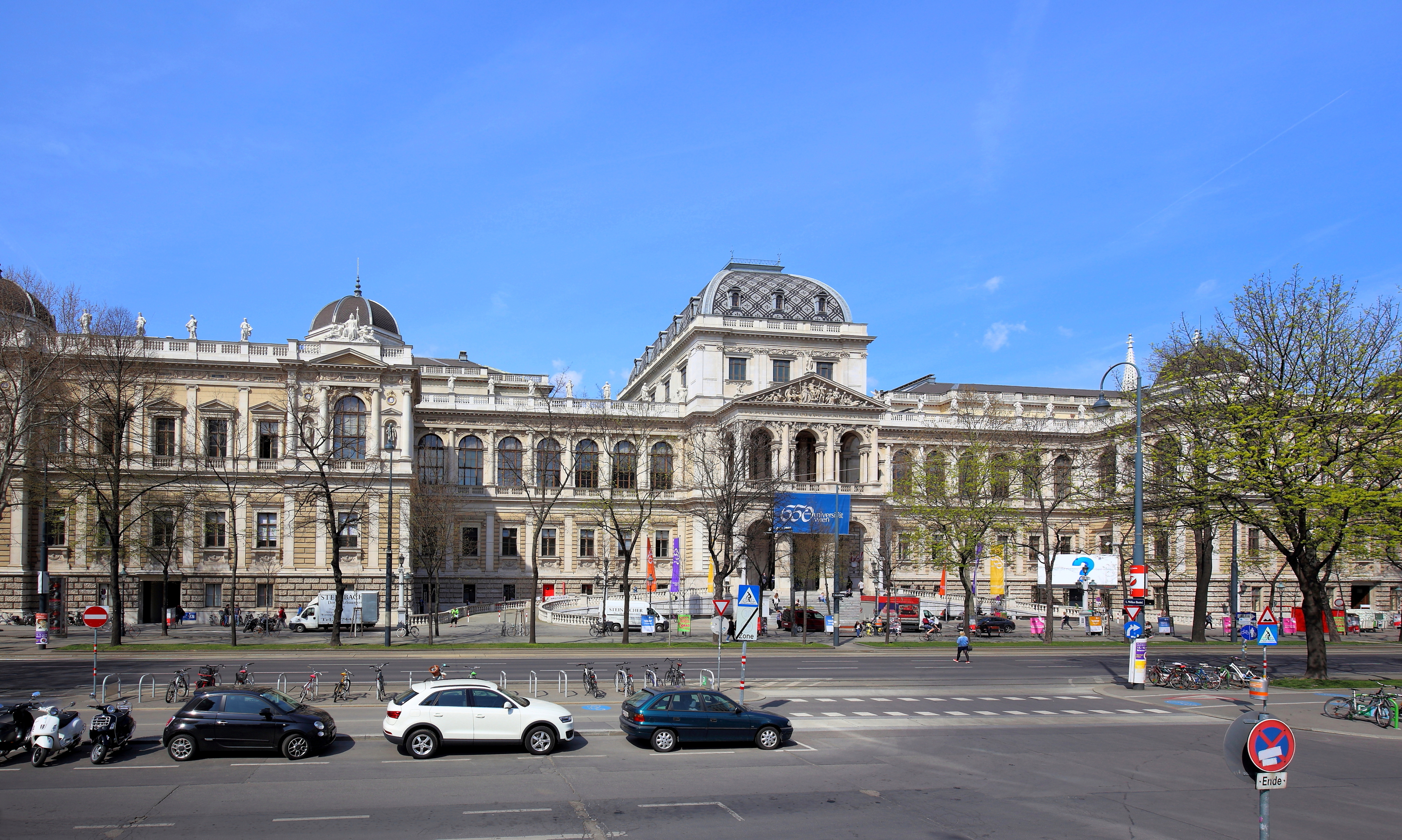
- Main building of the University of Vienna on the Ringstraße
- Interactive map of the Main Building of the University of Vienna area

General information
- Architectural style: Historicist, Neo-Renaissance
- Location: Universitätsring 1, 1010 Vienna
- Coordinates: 48°12′46.8″N 16°21′34.92″E
- Construction started: 1873
- Completed: 1884
- Owner: University of Vienna

Technical details
- Material: Stone, brick
- Floor count: 4

Design and construction
- Architect: Heinrich von Ferstel

The Main building of the University of Vienna (German: Hauptgebäude der Universität Wien, colloquially Hauptuni) is located on the Ringstraße in the first district of Vienna. It was designed by Heinrich von Ferstel and built in 1873.

== History ==
=== Prehistory ===
Founded in 1365, the University of Vienna was originally housed in various buildings in the Stubenviertel of the historic old town. After 1623, the site was rebuilt as the Jesuit College, which, together with the University Church (Universitätskirche), has been preserved as the Old University.

Between 1753 and 1755, a new main building, the Neue Aula, was constructed nearby. After the suppression of the Revolution of 1848, the building was occupied by the military and university operations were curtailed, and students were driven out of the city. In 1857, the Neue Aula was transferred to the Academy of Sciences. Teaching was thereafter dispersed across several provisional locations throughout Vienna, underscoring the need for a new central main building.

=== Planning and construction ===
In 1854, Minister of Education Leopold, Count von Thun und Hohenstein, proposed the construction of a new university building at the Rossauer Glacis in today’s 9th district. Initial plans near the Währinger Straße were abandoned after construction of the Votivkirche began in 1856. Political and military events, including the Italian war of 1859 and Thun’s departure from government in 1860, delayed the project. The plans were widely debated and repeatedly revised, ranging from a single monumental building to a campus model. Only one building from this phase was realised: the Chemical Institute on Währinger Straße, built by Heinrich von Ferstel between 1869 and 1872.

A change occurred in 1868, when Emperor Franz Joseph I approved the redevelopment of the former parade ground near the old town as part of the Ringstraße project. It was decided that the Parliament, Rathaus, and the University would be built there, with Ferstel appointed architect for the university. Despite resistance from some faculties, the Ringstraße site was ultimately confirmed.

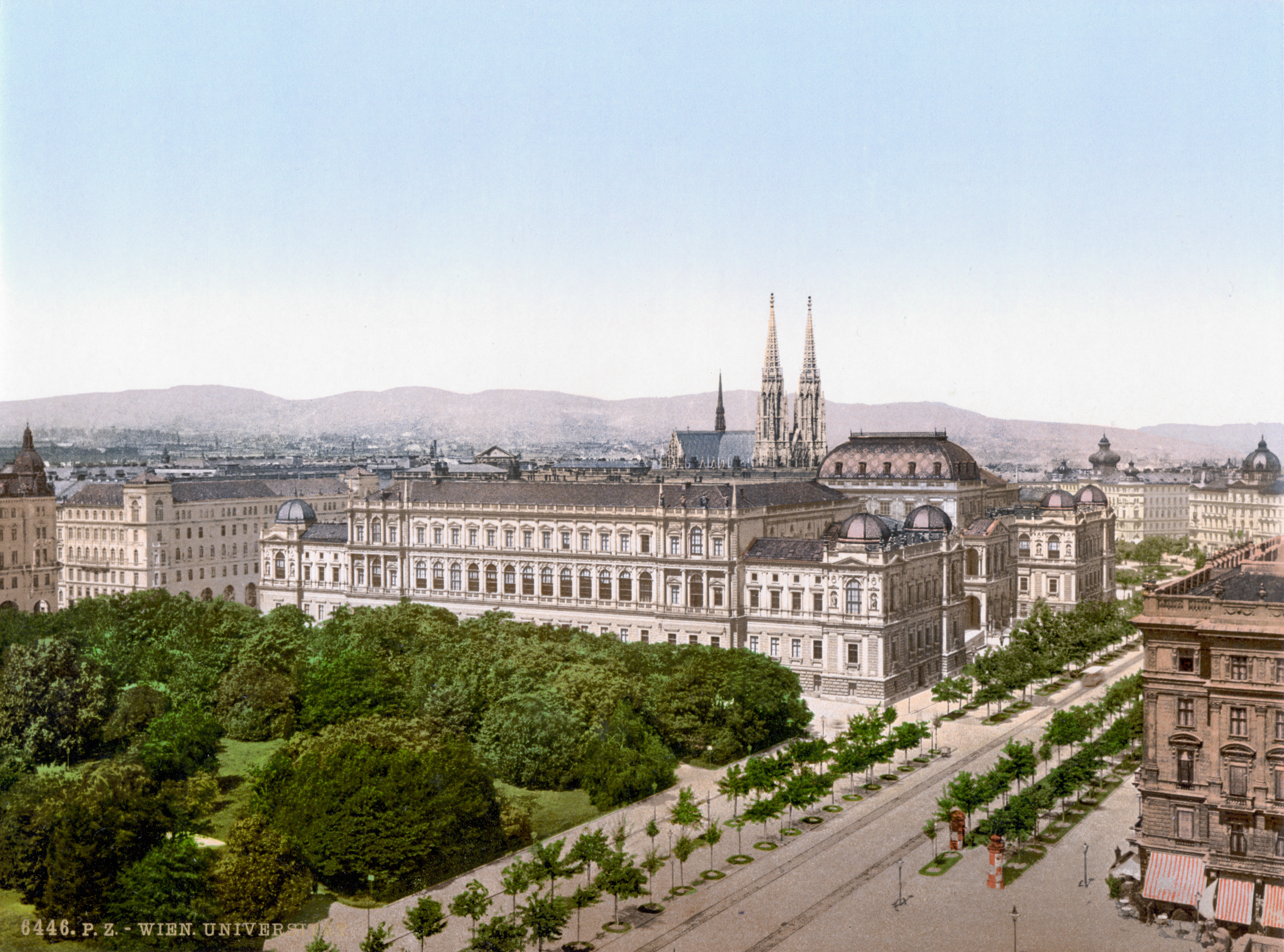
The university in 1900, the Rathauspark infront and the Votivkirche behind.

Ferstel’s plans were approved in 1872, and construction began in 1873 after imperial funding was granted. Ferstel died in 1883 and was succeeded by his son Max von Ferstel and Karl Köchlin. The building was largely completed in 1884 and ceremonially opened on 10 October 1884 in the presence of the Emperor; decorative work continued for several years thereafter.

=== Contemporary history ===
The building has repeatedly been a focal point of political and ideological conflict throughout the 20th century. During the interwar period, rising nationalist and Nazi student groups were increasingly active on campus, contributing to a tense climate and occasional clashes with other student factions and faculty as Austria grappled with broader political polarization in the First Republic.

On 22 June 1936, the philosopher Moritz Schlick, founder of the Vienna Circle and a prominent professor at the university, was murdered on a staircase inside the building by a former student, Johann Nelböck. Nelböck shot Schlick multiple times; the killing was widely interpreted in its historical context as reflecting the era’s turbulent intellectual and political climate, including rising intolerance and nationalism. A memorial inscription now marks the site of the killing.

Another controversial element of the university’s political history was the Siegfriedskopf, a war memorial installed in the foyer in 1923 by the then-dominant Deutsche Studentenschaft (German Student Body). Critics argued that the monument drew on nationalist and antidemocratic symbolism and excluded Jewish, socialist, and liberal members of the academic community. Amid decades of debate over its place at the university, the Siegfriedskopf was eventually moved to a less prominent location in the Arkadenhof during renovations between 2003 and 2006.

== The building ==
As a homage to the first flourishing period of the sciences in Europe, Ferstel chose the style of the Italian High Renaissance for the building, taking the universities of Padua and Genoa as models. The building complex features a large arcaded courtyard measuring 50 × 40 metres as well as eight smaller courtyards. The main façade, with its access ramp, is structured by projecting corner risalits and an elevated central section. The building is located adjacent to the Schottentor station, which is served by the U2 metro line and ten tram lines.

The site of the main building covers an area of 21,412 m², of which 14,530 m² are built over.

=== Present use ===
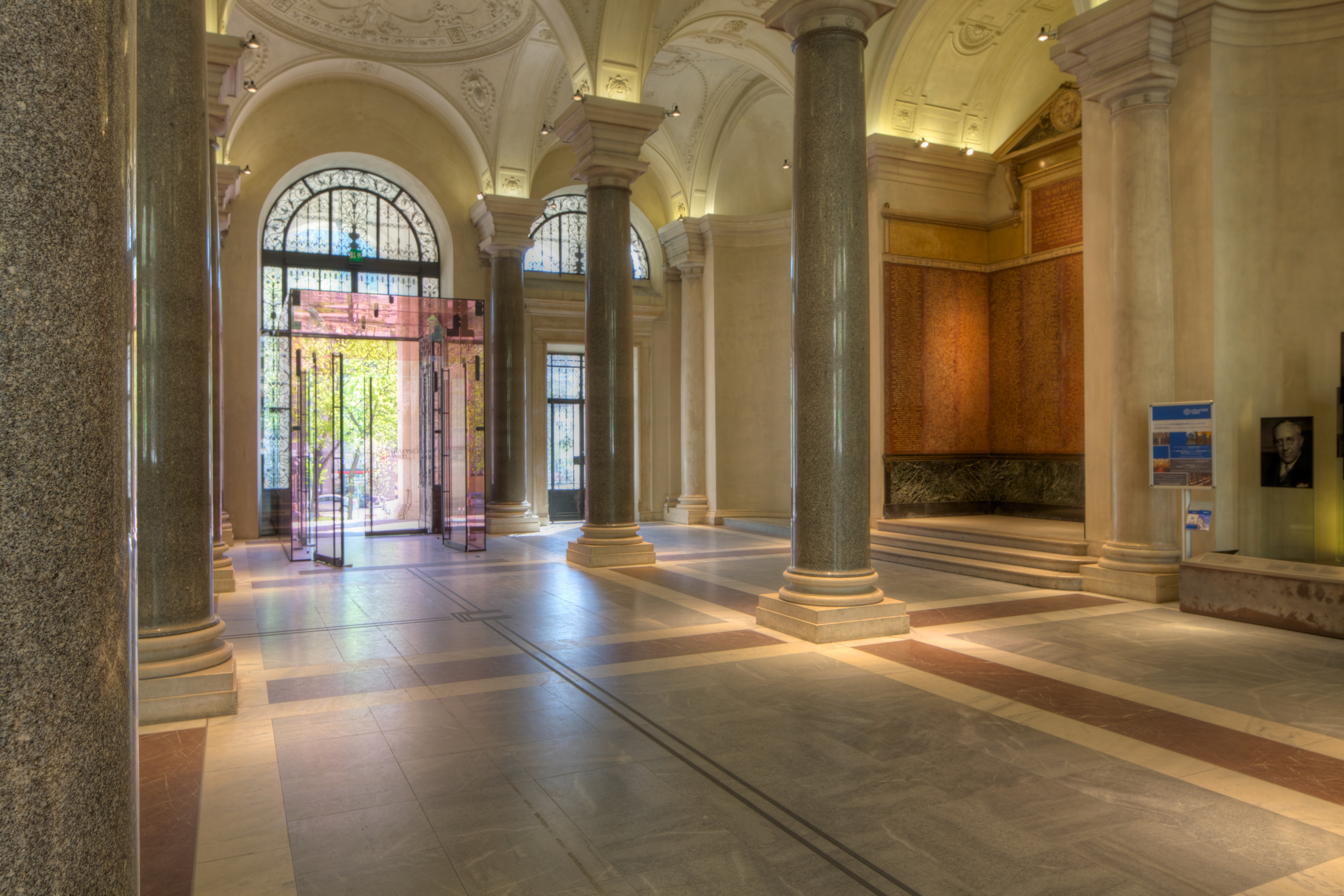
The foyer of the Hauptuni.

The main building currently accommodates a range of academic, administrative, and representative facilities, distributed across its floors, including the departments of History, Classical Philology, Anchient History and Classical Studies, Economic and Social History, Catholic Theology, and Protestant Theology. The Auditorium Maximum (colloquially Audimax), built in the 1930s, is with 751 seats the largest lecture hall in Austria. The Main Ceremonial Hall (Grosser Festsaal), Small Ceremonial Hall (Kleiner Festsaal), and the Senate Hall (Senatssaal) are located in the building, as well as the Admissions Office.

The building houses multiple academic libraries, including the Main Library, and many departmental libraries, including the Historical Studies Library.

=== Arkadenhof ===
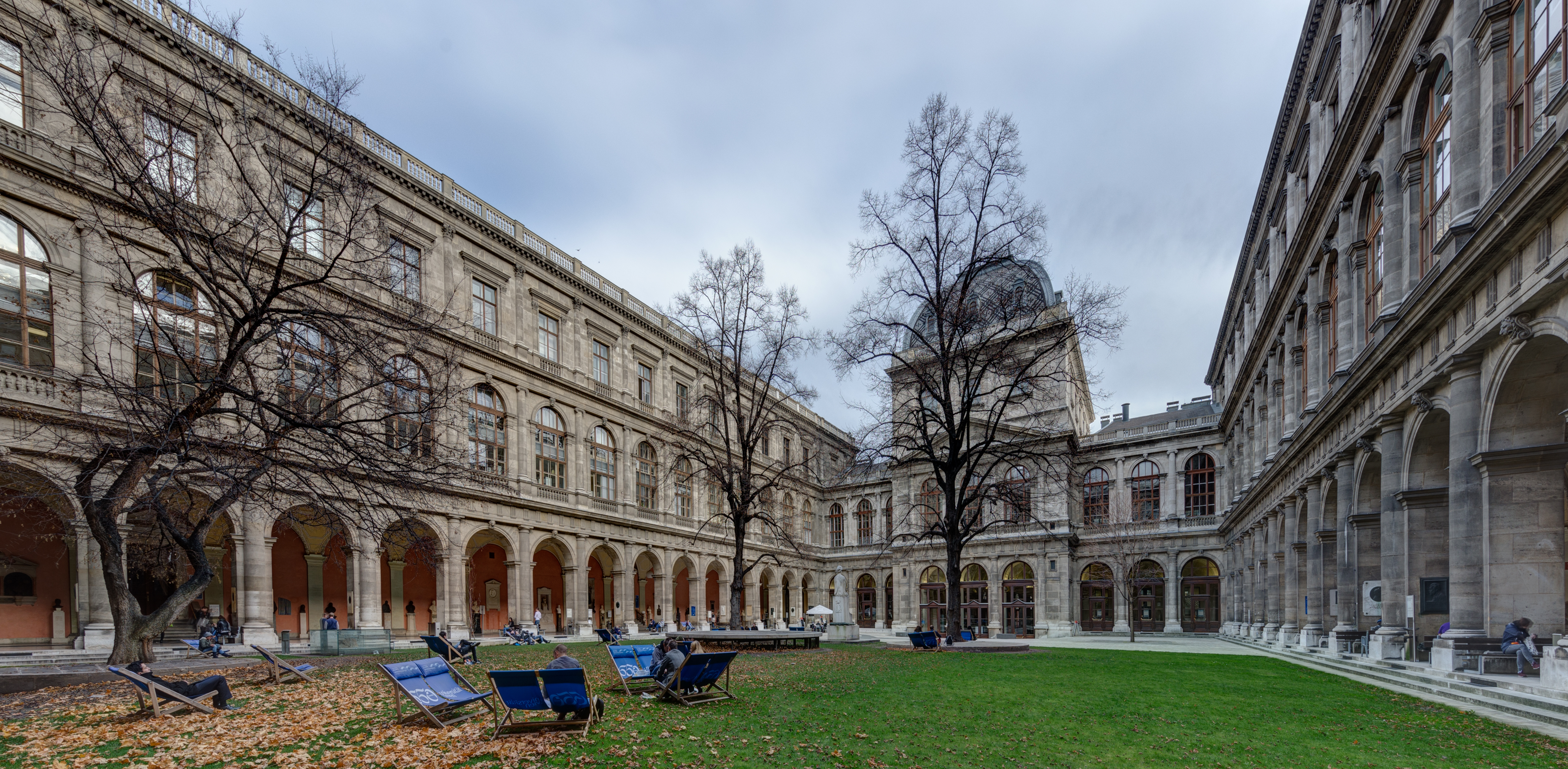
The Arkadenhof

Heinrich von Ferstel intended the large central arcaded courtyard (Arkadenhof) to be understood as the heart of the complex. From this space, all of the building’s principal staircases can be accessed. Surrounding the courtyard is a collection of statues and busts commemorating distinguished scholars associated with the University of Vienna. Professors may be honoured with a monument in the Arkadenhof after their death. Notable examples include Lise Meitner, Marie Jahoda, Sigmund Freud, Erwin Schrödinger, and Christian Doppler.

As there were almost no memorials dedicated to women in the Arkadenhof, the university commissioned the art installation Der Muse reicht’s (The Muse has had it) by Austrian artist Iris Andraschek, which was unveiled in 2009. The work takes the form of a large, shadow-like silhouette embedded in the courtyard floor and was conceived as a critical intervention in the university’s commemorative tradition, which had long focused almost exclusively on male scholars.

At the centre of the Arkadenhof is the Castalia Fountain (Kastaliabrunnen), created by the sculptor Edmund von Hellmer. The fountain alludes to the mythological Castalian Spring, traditionally associated with wisdom, poetry, and learning.

== Gallery ==
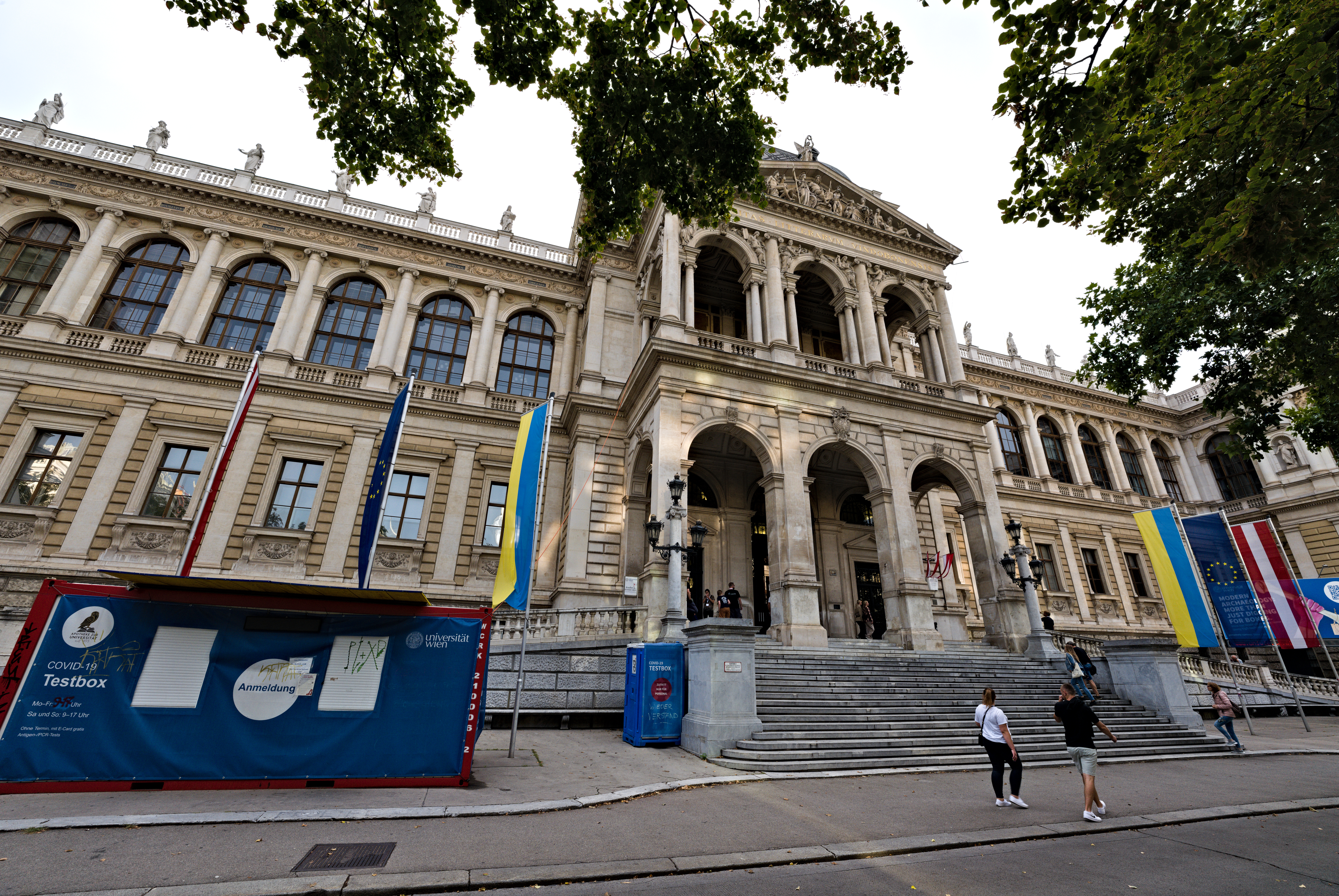
Entrance to the building

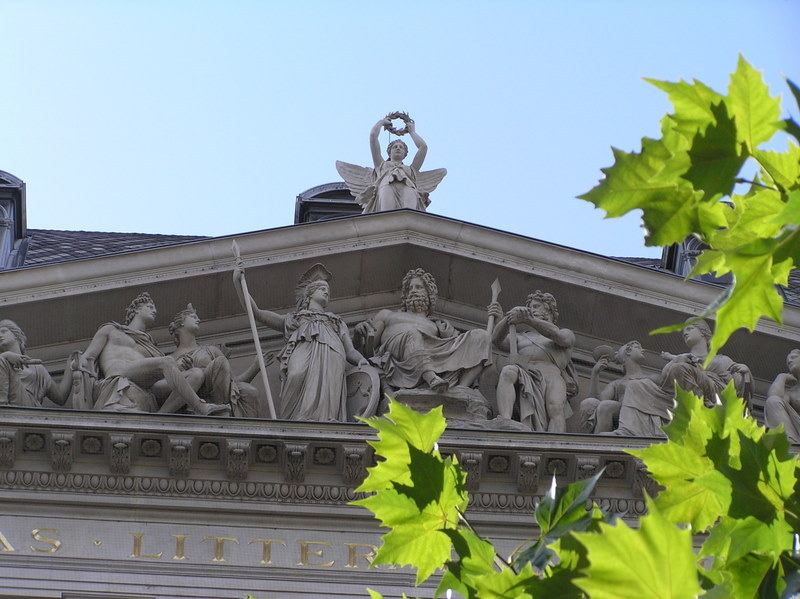
Sculpture over the entrance

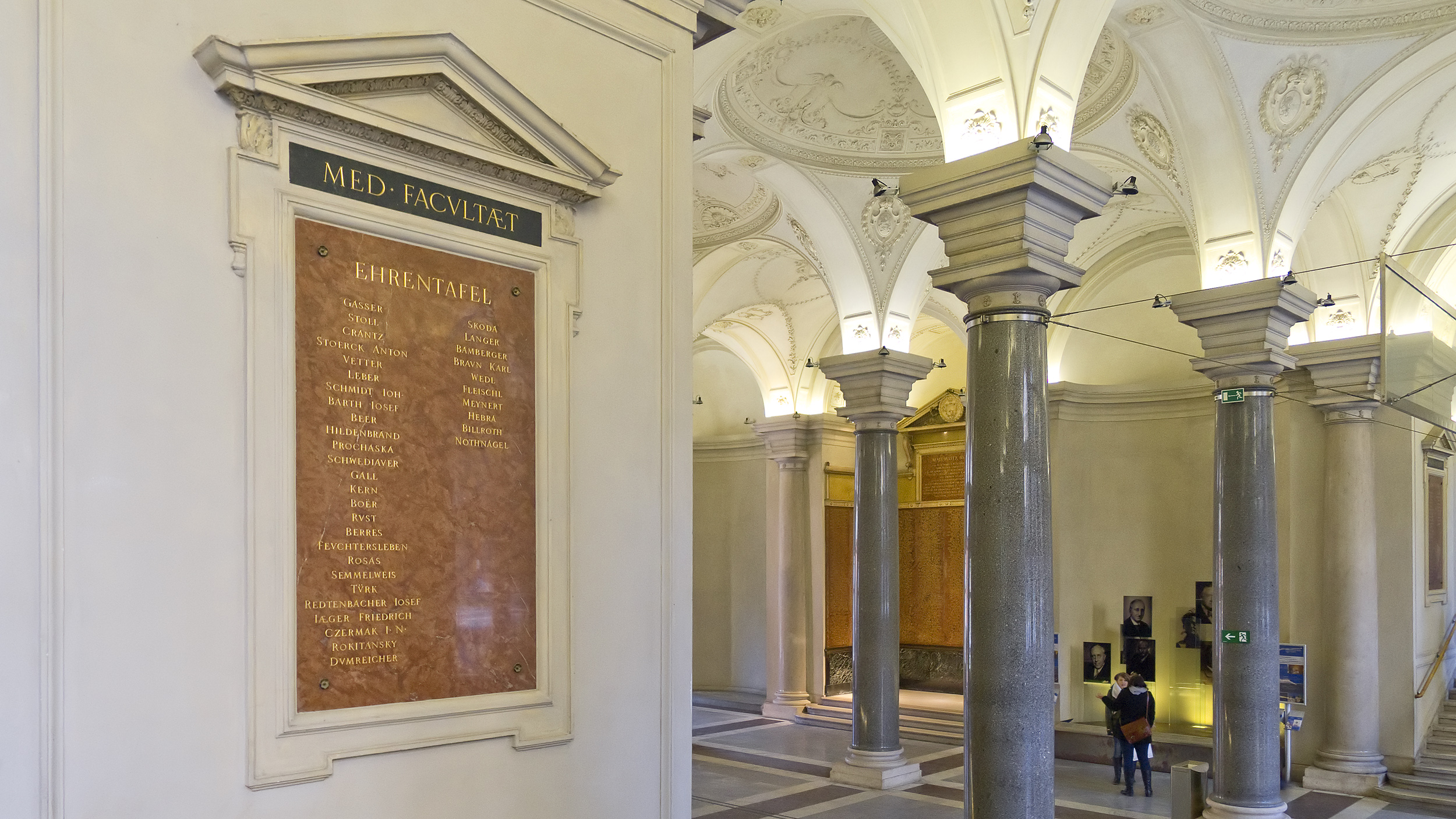
Commemorative plaque in the foyer

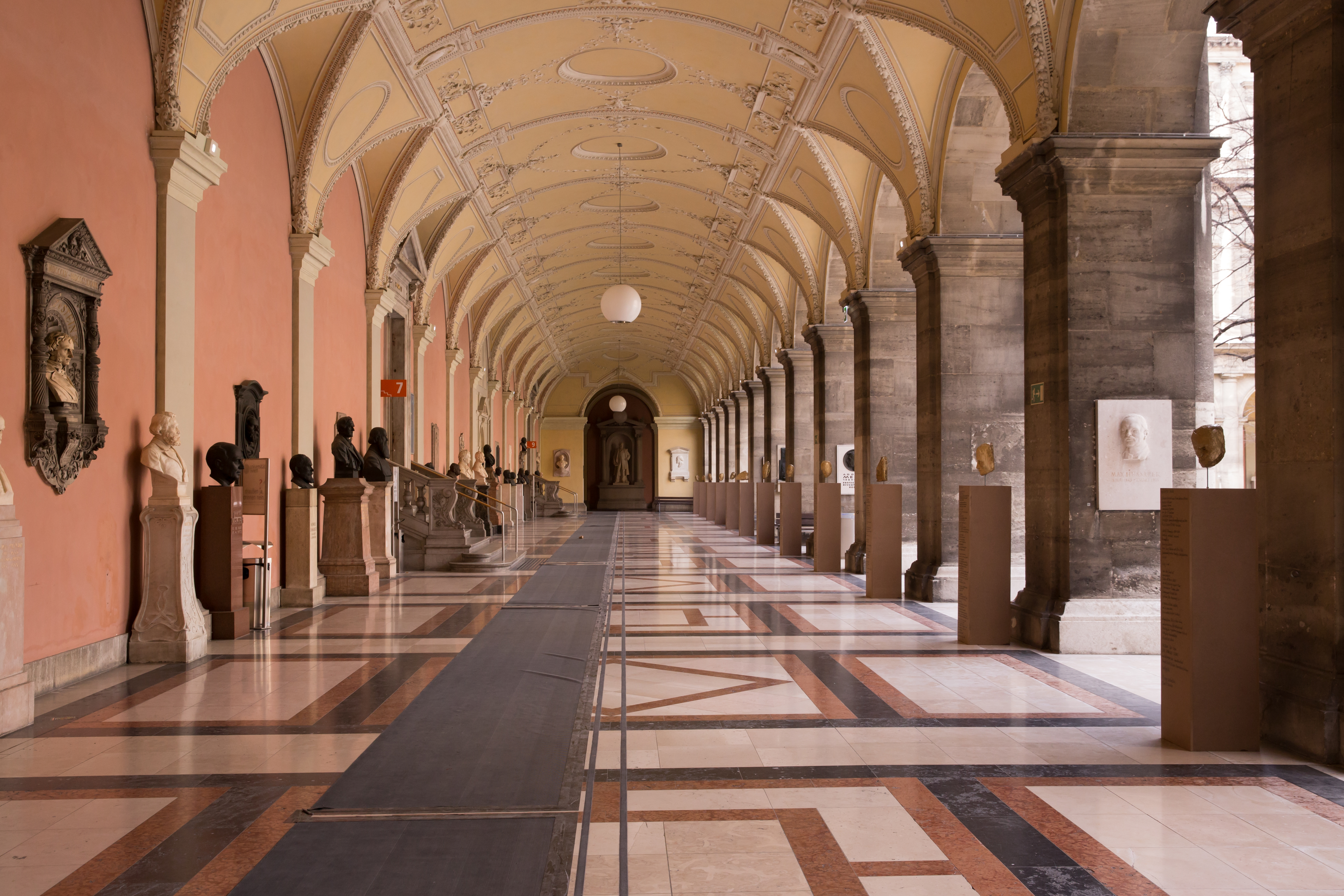
Statues in the Arkadenhof

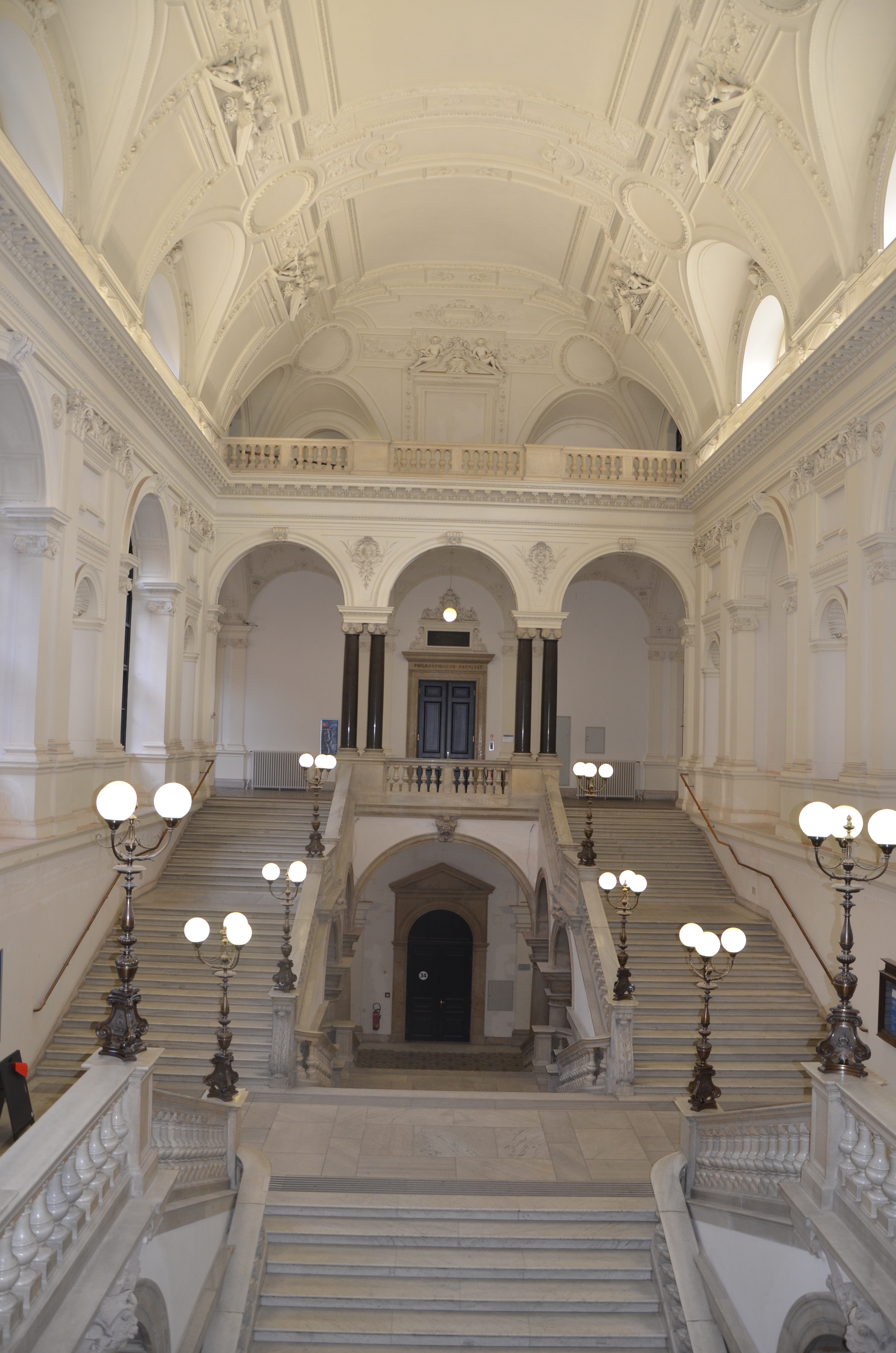
Staircase in the uni

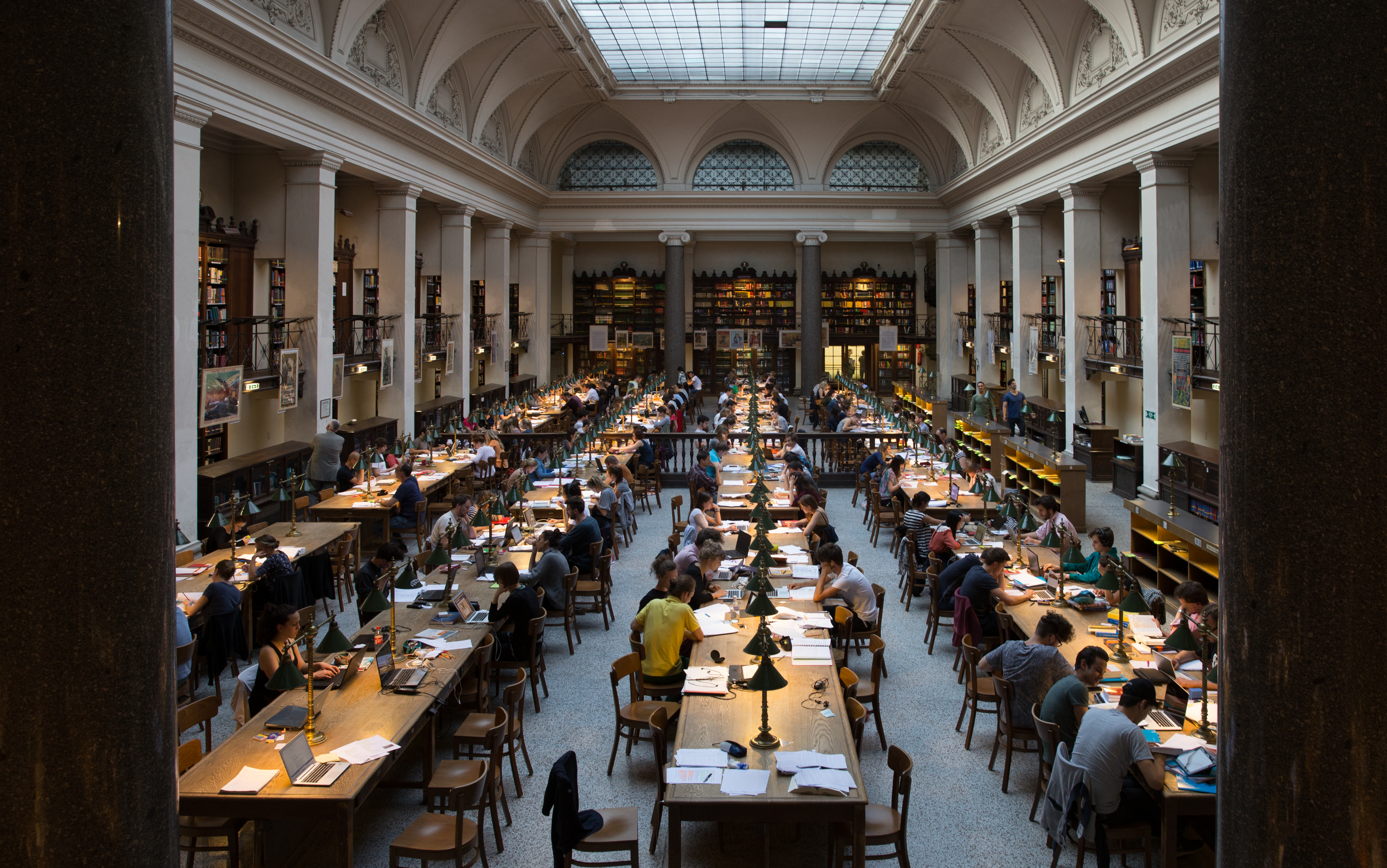
Reading room of the Main Library

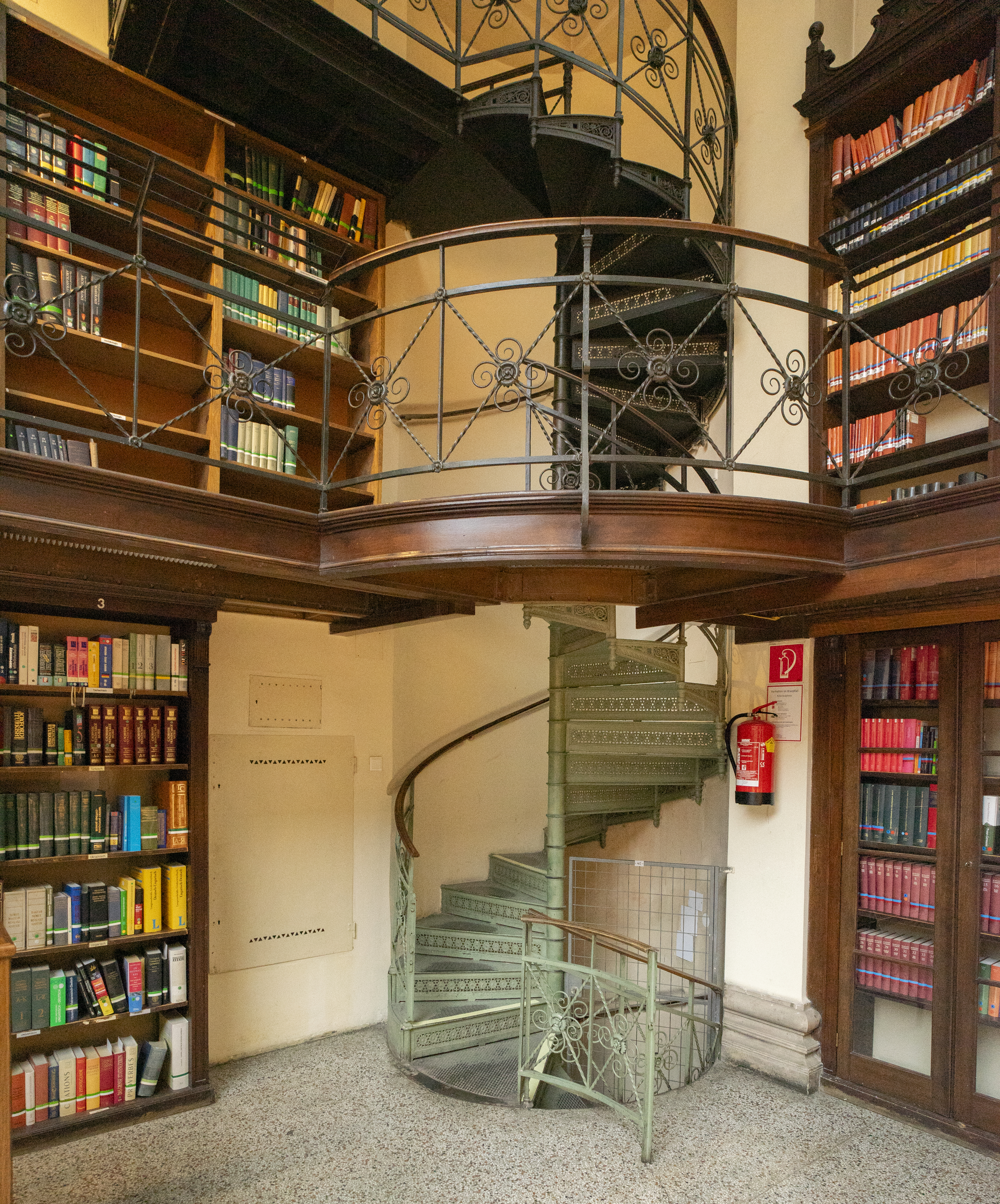
Bookshelves in the Main Library
