= Moritz Schlick =

German philosopher and physicist (1883–1936)

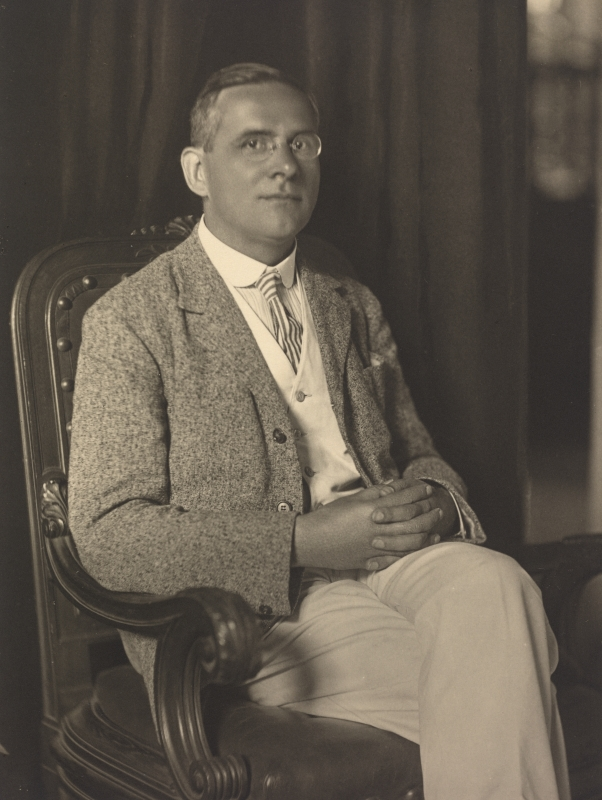
- Moritz Schlick around 1930
- Born: Friedrich Albert Moritz Schlick; 14 April 1882; Berlin, German Empire
- Died: 22 June 1936 (aged 54); Vienna, Austria

Education
- Education: University of Heidelberg; University of Lausanne; University of Berlin (PhD, 1904); University of Rostock (Dr. phil. hab., 1910)
- Theses: Über die Reflexion des Lichts in einer inhomogenen Schicht (On the Reflection of Light in a Non-Homogeneous Medium) (1904); Das Wesen der Wahrheit nach der modernen Logik (The Nature of Truth According to Modern Logic) (1910)
- Doctoral advisor: Max Planck

Philosophical work
- Era: 20th-century philosophy
- Region: Western philosophy
- School: Analytic philosophy Vienna Circle; Logical positivism Foundationalism
- Institutions: University of Rostock; University of Kiel; University of Vienna
- Doctoral students: Rudolf Carnap; Herbert Feigl; Johann Nelböck; Karl Popper; Rose Rand; Friedrich Waismann
- Main interests: Logic, philosophy of science, philosophy of mathematics, ethics
- Notable ideas: General theory of knowledge Beobachtungssatz (observational statement); Internal and application rules of grammar

Friedrich Albert Moritz Schlick (/ʃlɪk/; German: [ʃlɪk]; 14 April 1882 – 22 June 1936) was a German philosopher, physicist, and the founding father of logical positivism and the Vienna Circle. He was murdered by a former student, Johann Nelböck, in 1936.

== Early life and works ==
Schlick was born in Berlin to a wealthy Prussian family with deep nationalist and conservative traditions. His father was Ernst Albert Schlick and his mother was Agnes Arndt. At the age of sixteen, he started to read Descartes' Meditations and Schopenhauer's Die beiden Grundprobleme der Ethik. Nietzsche's Also sprach Zarathustra especially impressed him.

He studied physics at the University of Heidelberg, the University of Lausanne, and, ultimately, the University of Berlin under Max Planck. Schlick explained this choice in his autobiography by saying that, despite his love for philosophy, he believed that only mathematical physics could help him obtain actual and exact knowledge. He felt deep distrust towards any metaphysical speculation.

In 1904, he completed his PhD thesis at the University of Berlin under the supervision of Planck. Schlick's thesis was titled Über die Reflexion des Lichts in einer inhomogenen Schicht (On the Reflection of Light in a Non-Homogeneous Medium). After a year as Privatdozent at Göttingen, he turned to the study of philosophy in Zurich. In 1907, he married Blanche Hardy. In 1908, he published Lebensweisheit (The Wisdom of Life), a slim volume about eudaemonism, the theory that happiness results from the pursuit of personal fulfillment as opposed to passing pleasures.

His habilitation thesis at the University of Rostock, Das Wesen der Wahrheit nach der modernen Logik (The Nature of Truth According to Modern Logic), was published in 1910. Several essays about aesthetics followed, whereupon Schlick turned his attention to problems of epistemology, the philosophy of science, and more general questions about science. In this last category, Schlick distinguished himself by publishing a paper in 1915 about Einstein's special theory of relativity, a topic only ten years old. He also published Raum und Zeit in der gegenwärtigen Physik (Space and Time in Contemporary Physics), which extended his earlier results by applying Poincaré's geometric conventionalism to explain Einstein's adoption of a non-Euclidean geometry in the general theory of relativity. Schlick corresponded by letter with Einstein and Einstein praised the book, stating "from the philosophical side nothing has been written about the subject with anything like the same degree of clarity".

== The Vienna Circle and Wittgenstein ==
After early appointments at Rostock and Kiel, in 1922, Schlick assumed the chair of Naturphilosophie at the University of Vienna, which had previously been held by Ludwig Boltzmann and Ernst Mach. Schlick displayed an unusual success in organizing talented individuals in the philosophical and scientific spheres. When Schlick arrived in Vienna, he was invited to lead a group of scientists and philosophers who met regularly (on Thursday evenings in the Chemistry Building) to discuss philosophical topics in the sciences. Early members included the mathematician Hans Hahn and, within a few years, they were joined by Rudolf Carnap, Herbert Feigl, Kurt Gödel, Otto Neurath, Friedrich Waismann, and others. They initially called themselves the Ernst Mach Association, but they eventually became best known as the Vienna Circle.

In the years 1925–26, the Thursday night group discussed recent work in the foundations of mathematics by Gottlob Frege, Bertrand Russell, and Ludwig Wittgenstein. Wittgenstein's book, Tractatus Logico-Philosophicus, was a work that advanced, among other things, a logical theory of symbolism and a "picture" or "model" theory of language. Schlick and his group were impressed by the work, devoting considerable time to its study and even when it was no longer the principal focus of their discussion, it was mentioned in discussion.

Eventually, Wittgenstein agreed to meet with Schlick and other Circle members to discuss the Tractatus and other ideas, but he later found it necessary to restrict the visitors to sympathetic interlocutors. Through Schlick's influence, Wittgenstein was encouraged to consider a return to philosophy after some ten years away from the field. Schlick and Waismann's discussions with Wittgenstein continued until the latter felt that germinal ideas had been used without permission in an essay by Carnap, a charge of dubious merit. But he continued discussions in letters to Schlick after he no longer met with other Circle members.

== General Theory of Knowledge and other works ==
Schlick had worked on his Allgemeine Erkenntnislehre (General Theory of Knowledge) between 1918 and 1925, and, though later developments in his philosophy were to make various contentions of his epistemology untenable, the General Theory is perhaps his greatest work in its acute reasoning against synthetic a priori knowledge. This critique of synthetic a priori knowledge argues that the only truths which are self-evident to reason are statements which are true as a matter of definition, such as the statements of formal logic and mathematics. The truth of all other statements must be evaluated with reference to empirical evidence. If a statement is proposed which is not a matter of definition, and not capable of being confirmed or falsified by evidence, that statement is "metaphysical", which is synonymous with "meaningless" or "nonsense". This is the principle upon which members of the Vienna Circle were most clearly in agreement with each other, as well as with Wittgenstein.

Schlick distinguished between internal rules and application rules of language. The former are grammar rules which govern the usage of expressions in relation to other expressions, such as formation rules and transformation rules. The latter are rules which govern the application of language to things external to language, these include descriptions of observations and the use of indexicals and demonstratives.

=== Free will ===
Schlick believed in free will. He regarded the "so-called problem of the freedom of the will" as a "pseudo-problem" which was "one of the greatest scandals of philosophy".

In Schlick's view the supposed contradiction between determinism and free will was caused by a misunderstanding due to "an erroneous interpretation of the meaning of 'law'". In the legal system a law is "a rule by which the state prescribes certain behaviour to its citizens". Whereas in science, "the word 'law' means something quite different. The natural law is not a prescription as to how something should behave, but a formula, a description of how something does in fact behave. The two forms of 'laws' have only this in common: both tend to be expressed in formulae'. This has led to confusion among philosophers and "since natural laws are only descriptions of what happens, there can be in regard to them no talk of 'compulsion'".

He wrote that:

It is again very deplorable that the word "necessary" has been applied to natural laws (or, what amounts to the same thing, with reference to causality), for it is quite superfluous, since the expression "universally valid" is available. Universal validity is something altogether different from "compulsion"; these concepts belong to spheres so remote from each other that once insight into the error has been gained one can no longer conceive the possibility of a confusion.

== Problems of Ethics ==
Between 1926 and 1930, Schlick labored to finish Fragen der Ethik (Problems of Ethics), in which he surprised some of his fellow Circlists by including ethics as a viable branch of philosophy. In his 1932–33 contribution to Erkenntnis, "Positivism and Realism", Schlick offered one of the most illuminating definitions of positivism as every view "which denies the possibility of metaphysics" (Schlick [1932–1933], p. 260). Accordingly, he defined metaphysics as the doctrine of "true being", "thing in itself" or "transcendental being", a doctrine which obviously "presupposes that a non-true, lesser or apparent being stands opposed to it" (Ibid). Therefore, in this work he bases the positivism on a kind of epistemology which holds that the only true beings are givens or constituents of experience. Also during this time, the Vienna Circle published The Scientific View of the World: The Vienna Circle as a homage to Schlick. Its strong anti-metaphysical stance crystallized the viewpoint of the group.

=== Comment on Wittgenstein's Tractatus ===
Rudolf Carnap, in his book Logical Syntax of Language, included a comment by Schlick on Wittgenstein's Tractatus.

Schlick ( [Wende] p.8 ) interprets Wittgenstein's position as follows: philosophy "is that activity by which the meaning of propositions is established or discovered"; it is a question of "what the propositions actually mean. The content, soul, and spirit of science naturally consist in what is ultimately meant by its sentences; the philosophical activity of rendering significant is thus the alpha and omega of all scientific knowledge".

— Carnap, Logical Syntax of Language, p. 284

== Death ==
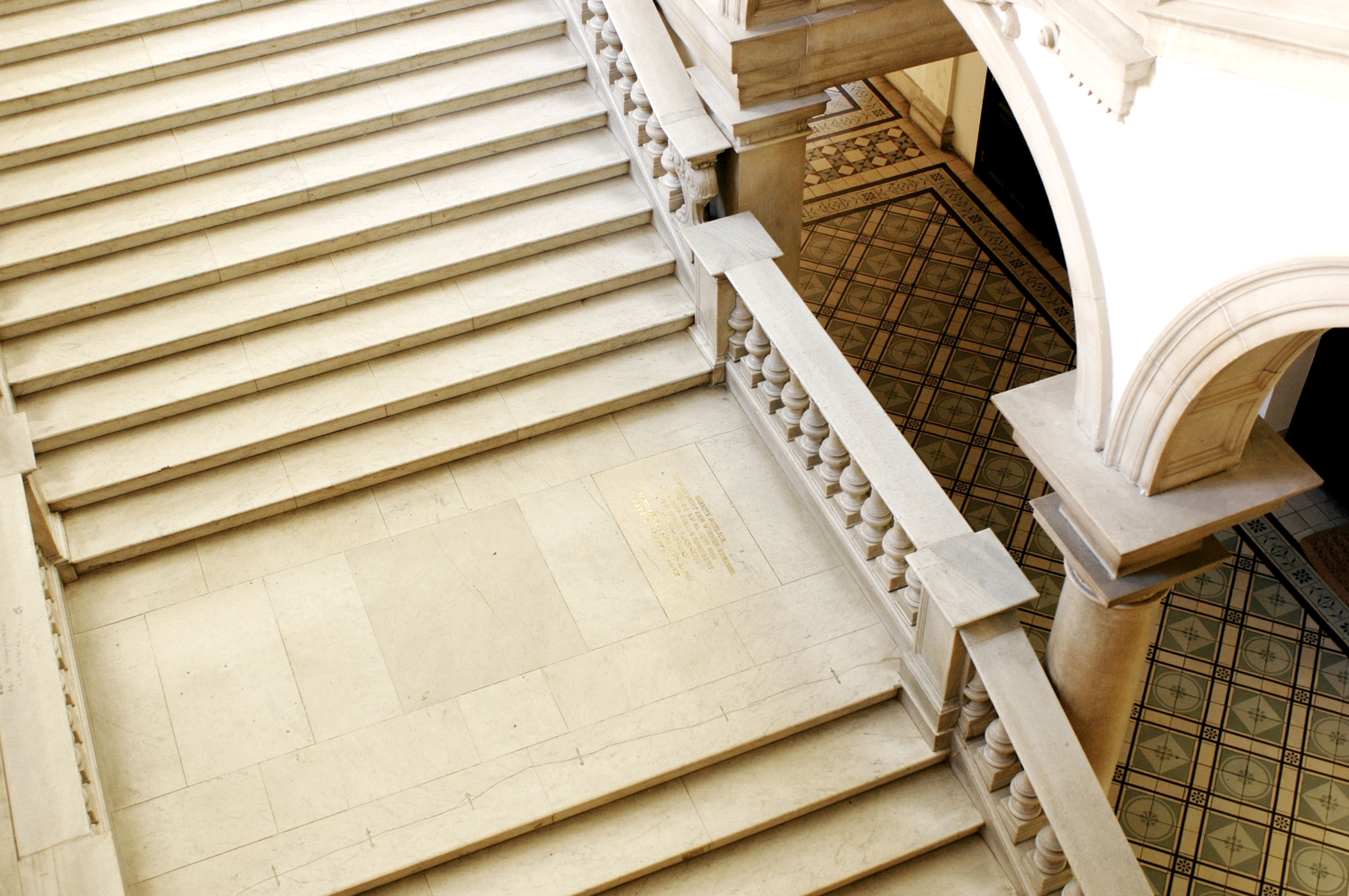
Inscription on a staircase of the main building of the University of Vienna where the murder took place

With the rise of the Nazis in Germany and Austrofascism in Austria, many of the Vienna Circle's members left for the United States and the United Kingdom. Schlick, however, stayed on at the University of Vienna. When visited by Herbert Feigl in 1935, he expressed dismay at events in Germany. On 22 June 1936, Schlick was ascending the steps of the university for a class when he was confronted by a former student, Johann Nelböck, who shot Schlick in the chest, killing him. The substantiation of the judgment of the Provincial Court for Criminal Matters of Vienna (dated 26 May 1937) summed up:

On June 22, 1936, at 9.20 a.m., the defendant shot and killed Dr. Moritz Schlick, professor at the School of Philosophy, on the premises of the University of Vienna on the main stairway leading to the School of Philosophy when Dr. Schlick was on the way to his lecture. According to the findings of the autopsy, Dr. Schlick was hit by 4 bullets which were shot from a pistol of the caliber 6.35 mm. [...] The [...] injuries were absolutely lethal, and Dr. Schlick did indeed die at the spot where he had fallen down even before medical help arrived at the scene of the crime.

The court declared Nelböck to be of sound mind; he confessed to the act and was detained without any resistance, but was unrepentant.

The killer used the judicial proceedings as a chance to present himself and his ideology in the public. He claimed that Schlick's anti-metaphysical philosophy had "interfered with his moral restraint". In another version of the events, the murderer covered up all political causes and claimed that he was motivated by jealousy over his failed attachment to the female student Sylvia Borowicka, leading to a paranoid delusion about Schlick as his rival and persecutor.

Nelböck was tried and sentenced, but the event became a distorted cause célèbre around which crystallized the growing nationalist and anti-Jewish sentiments in the city. The fact that Schlick was not Jewish did not seem to matter to propagandists capitalizing on the crime, who associated Schlick with Jewish members of the intelligentsia. After the annexation of Austria into Nazi Germany in 1938, Nelböck was released on probation after serving two years of a 10-year sentence.

== Legacy ==
Schlick's enduring contribution to the world of philosophy is as the founder of logical positivism. His humanity, good will, gentleness, and especially his encouragement have been documented by many of his peers. Herbert Feigl and Albert Blumberg, in their introduction to the General Theory of Knowledge, wrote,

No other thinker was so well prepared to give new impetus to the philosophical questings of the younger generation. Though many of his students and successors have attained a higher degree of exactitude and adequacy in their logical analyses of problems in the theory of knowledge, Schlick had an unsurpassed sense for what is essential in philosophical issues.

— Feigl and Blumberg, Introduction, General Theory of Knowledge, p. xxi

== Works ==
- Lebensweisheit. Versuch einer Glückseligkeitslehre. Munich, Becksche Verlagsbuchhandlung 1908
- "Das Wesen der Wahrheit nach der modernen Logik", in: Vierteljahrsschrift für wissenschaftliche Philosophie und Soziologie, Jg. 34, 1910, p. 386–477
- "Die philosophische Bedeutung des Relativitätsprinzips", in: Zeitschrift für Philosophie und philosophische Kritik, 159, 1915, S. 129–175
- Raum und Zeit in der gegenwärtigen Physik. Berlin: Verlag von Julius Springer 1917 (4th ed. 1922)
- Hermann von Helmholtz. Schriften zur Erkenntnistheorie (Publishers: Moritz Schlick & Paul Hertz). Berlin: Springer 1921
- Allgemeine Erkenntnislehre. Berlin: Verlag von Julius Springer 1918 (2nd edition 1925)
- "Kritizistische oder empiristische Deutung der neuen Physik?", in: Kant-Studien, 26, 1921, p. 96–111
- "Einsteins Relativitätstheorie". In: Mosse Almanach, 1921, S. 105–123.
- "Erleben, Erkennen, Metaphysik", in: Kant-Studien, 31, 1926, p. 146–158
- "Vom Sinn des Lebens", in: Symposion. Philosophische Zeitschrift für Forschung und Aussprache, Jg. 1, 1927, p. 331–354
- Fragen der Ethik. Vienna: Verlag von Julius Springer 1930
- "Gibt es ein Materiales Apriori?", 1930
- "The Turning Point in Philosophy", 1930
- "Die Wende der Philosophie". Erkenntnis. 1: 4–11. 1930. doi:10.1007/BF00208605. S2CID 119913188.
- "The Future of Philosophy". In: College of the Pacific Publications in Philosophy, 1932, 1, 45-62
- "Über das Fundament der Erkenntnis". Erkenntnis. 4: 79–99. 1934. doi:10.1007/BF01793485. S2CID 143301931.
- "Unanswerable Questions?", 1935
- "Meaning and Verification", 1936
- Gesammelte Aufsätze 1926–1936. Vienna: Gerold & Co. 1938
- Die Probleme der Philosophie in ihrem Zusammenhang. Frankfurt: Suhrkamp Verlag 1986
- Moritz Schlick Gesamtausgabe. Vienna/New York: Springer Verlag 2006. — Almost complete author copy of Vol. I/1, I/2, I/3, I/5, I/6

== See also ==
- Definitions of philosophy
