= Johann Nelböck =

Austrian former student and murderer of Moritz Schlick

- Born: May 12, 1903; Brandel near Lichtenegg, Austria-Hungary
- Died: February 3, 1954 (aged 50); Vienna, Austria
- Other name: Hans Nelböck
- Known for: Murderer of Moritz Schlick

Academic background
- Education: University of Vienna (PhD, 1931)
- Doctoral advisor: Moritz Schlick

Johann "Hans" Nelböck (German: [ˈnɛlbœk]; May 12, 1903 – February 3, 1954) was an Austrian former student and murderer of Moritz Schlick, the founder of the group of philosophers and scientists known as the Vienna Circle.

== Biography ==
After attending the gymnasium in Wels, Nelböck studied philosophy at the University of Vienna from 1925 on with Moritz Schlick, who was his doctoral advisor, and graduated as a Doctor of Philosophy on March 21, 1931, with the doctoral thesis "The Importance of Logic in Empiricism and Positivism". Twice Nelböck was sent to a mental hospital with the diagnosis of schizoid personality disorder. He had threatened to kill Schlick.

On June 22, 1936, Nelböck shot Schlick in the chest, killing him on one of the central staircases of the University of Vienna. The substantiation of the judgment of the Provincial Court for Criminal Matters of Vienna (dated May 26, 1937) summed up:

On June 22, 1936, at 9.20 a.m., the defendant shot and killed Dr. Moritz Schlick, professor at the School of Philosophy, on the premises of the University of Vienna on the main stairway leading to the School of Philosophy when Dr. Schlick was on the way to his lecture. According to the findings of the autopsy, Dr. Schlick was hit by 4 bullets which were shot from a pistol of the caliber 6.35 mm. [...] The [...] injuries were absolutely lethal, and Dr. Schlick did indeed die at the spot where he had fallen down even before medical help arrived at the scene of the crime.

The court declared Nelböck to be fully compos mentis, he confessed to the act, was detained without any resistance, but was unrepentant. He used the judicial proceedings as a chance to present himself and his ideology in the public. A significant part of his defence was the claim that Schlick's anti-metaphysical philosophy had undermined his native moral restraints, a line of thought which Austrian Nazis, asserting Schlick's Jewish connections within the Vienna Circle, quickly developed and exploited. In another version of the events Nelböck covered all political causes up and claimed that he was motivated by jealousy over his failed attachment to the female student Sylvia Borowicka, leading to a paranoid delusion about Schlick as his rival and persecutor.

Nelböck was found guilty and sentenced, but, in the event, he became a distorted cause célèbre, around which crystallized the growing nationalist and anti-Jewish sentiments in the city. Although a German Protestant from minor Prussian nobility, Schlick was subsequently characterized in the press as a pivotal figure in disaffected Jewish circles, and the murder was applauded by Vienna's Austrofascists.

On May 26, 1937, Nelböck was sentenced to ten years' imprisonment, but only two years later—after the annexation of Austria into Nazi Germany in 1938—asked for a pardon. In his application he pointed out "that by his act and the result elimination of a Jewish teacher who propagated doctrines alien and detrimental to the nation he rendered National Socialism a service and also suffered for National Socialism as a consequence of his act. Since the world-view, the rightness of which he recognized even then and out of which he committed his act, is now the ruling national ideology, he considers it a hardship if he still has to remain in a disadvantaged position because of an act which sprang from his world-view." Because the Senior Public Prosecutor concluded that Nelböck's act was accompanied primarily by personal motives, Nelböck was only released on probation on October 11, 1938.

From 1938 on, Nelböck worked in the geological department of the wartime economic oil authority. When the period of probation ended in 1943, he worked as a technical employee in the Main Measurement Office.

In 1951, Nelböck sued Victor Kraft, a member of the Vienna Circle, who had called Nelböck a "paranoid psychopath" in his (Kraft's) book Der Wiener Kreis. Kraft agreed to an out-of-court settlement.

== Works ==
- Die Bedeutung der Logik im Empirismus und Positivismus. Dissertation, Vienna 1930.
