= Rathauspark =

Park in Vienna

Coordinates: 48.2097°N 16.3593°E

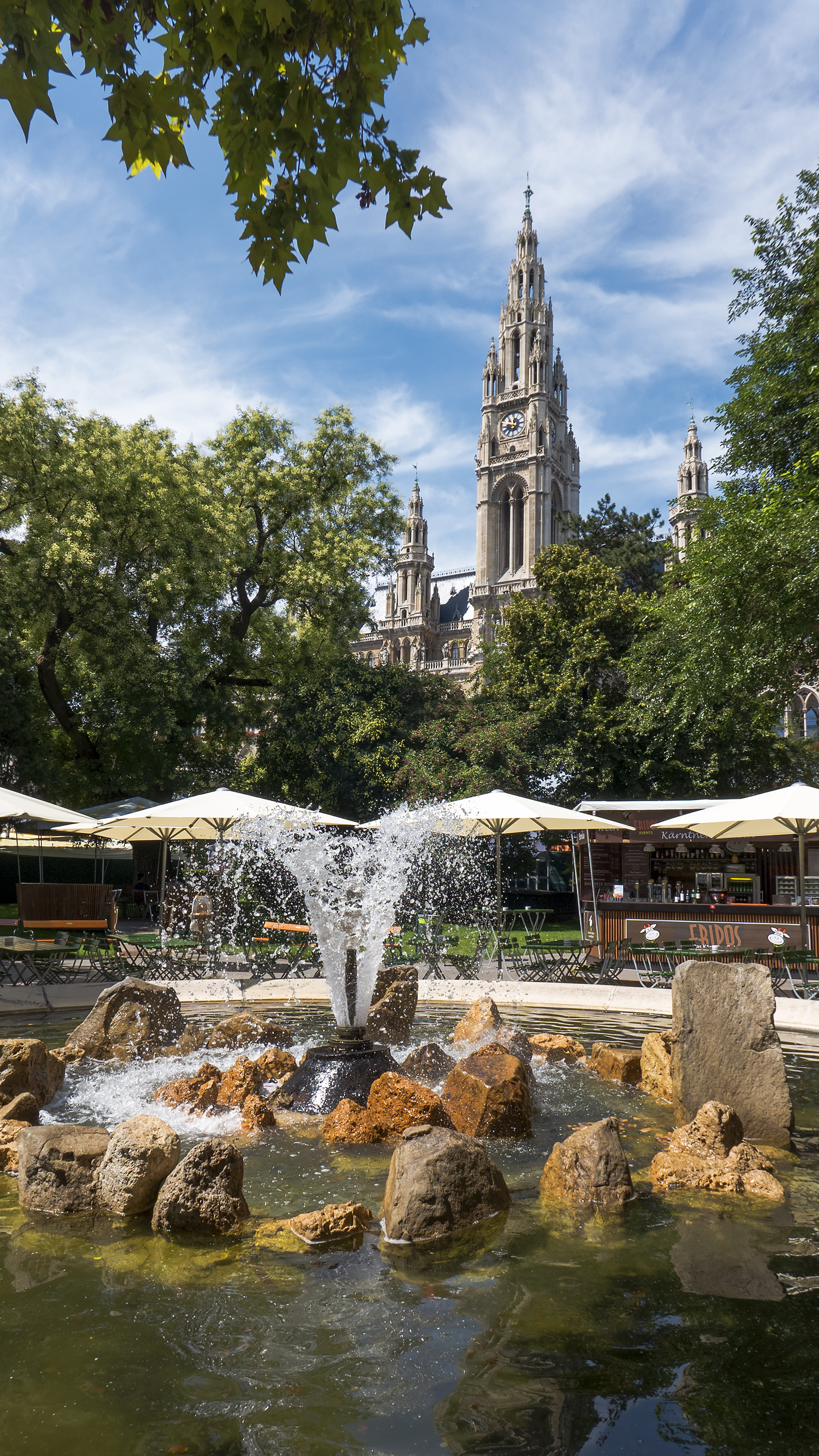
- Rathauspark with the Rathaus in the background
- Interactive map of Rathauspark
- Type: Public park
- Location: Innere Stadt, Vienna, Austria
- Area: 4 hectares (9.9 acres)
- Opened: 1872
- Status: Open year-round
- Website: www.wien.gv.at/umwelt/parks/anlagen/rathauspark.html

The Rathauspark is a 40,000 m² park in Vienna's first district, the Innere Stadt, in front of the Rathaus.

== History ==
The park was established in 1873 at the initiative of the Mayor of Vienna Cajetan Felder, replacing the former k.u.k. (Imperial and Royal) parade ground on the Josefstädter Glacis. The design was entrusted to the city planning office and city gardener Rudolph Siebeck, who arranged the park in two symmetrically laid-out sections, each centred around a fountain. The total budget for the project was 165,380 gulden (approximately 1.5 million euros).

Several disagreements accompanied the planning of the 370-meter-long and 160-meter-wide area. Friedrich von Schmidt, the architect behind the Rathaus, advocated for low plantings of shrubs and rose bushes in front of the building, as he believed that trees would obstruct the structure's facade. Additionally, Schmidt envisioned two large monumental fountains in the park and two diagonal roads that would cross the space. In October 1870, Siebeck presented a design that incorporated these elements.

However, Felder preferred the park to reflect the style of the Stadtpark, providing a recreational space for the public. Consequently, Siebeck revised the design, creating a park densely planted with trees. He eliminated the proposed roads and replaced them with meandering footpaths, similar to those found in the Stadtpark. The original monumental fountains were abandoned in favour of less expensive alternatives. The park was completed in time for the cornerstone-laying ceremony of the Rathaus on June 14, 1873.

In 1878, after the resignation of Mayor Felder and the retirement of Siebeck, Friedrich von Schmidt renewed efforts to redesign the park, with assistance from architects Theophil Hansen and Heinrich Ferstel, and the Vienna city council. In 1879, Lothar Abel, the new city gardener, proposed a design that would convert the park into a grassy area interspersed with shrubs. However, these plans were never realised, and the park retained its original configuration.

Notably, several mature plants were introduced during the park's creation, with some trees predating the establishment of the park itself. The oldest tree is a London plane (Platanus × hispanica), planted in 1783. This tree stands 30 meters tall, has a crown diameter of 21 meters, and a trunk circumference of 6 meters.

== Today ==
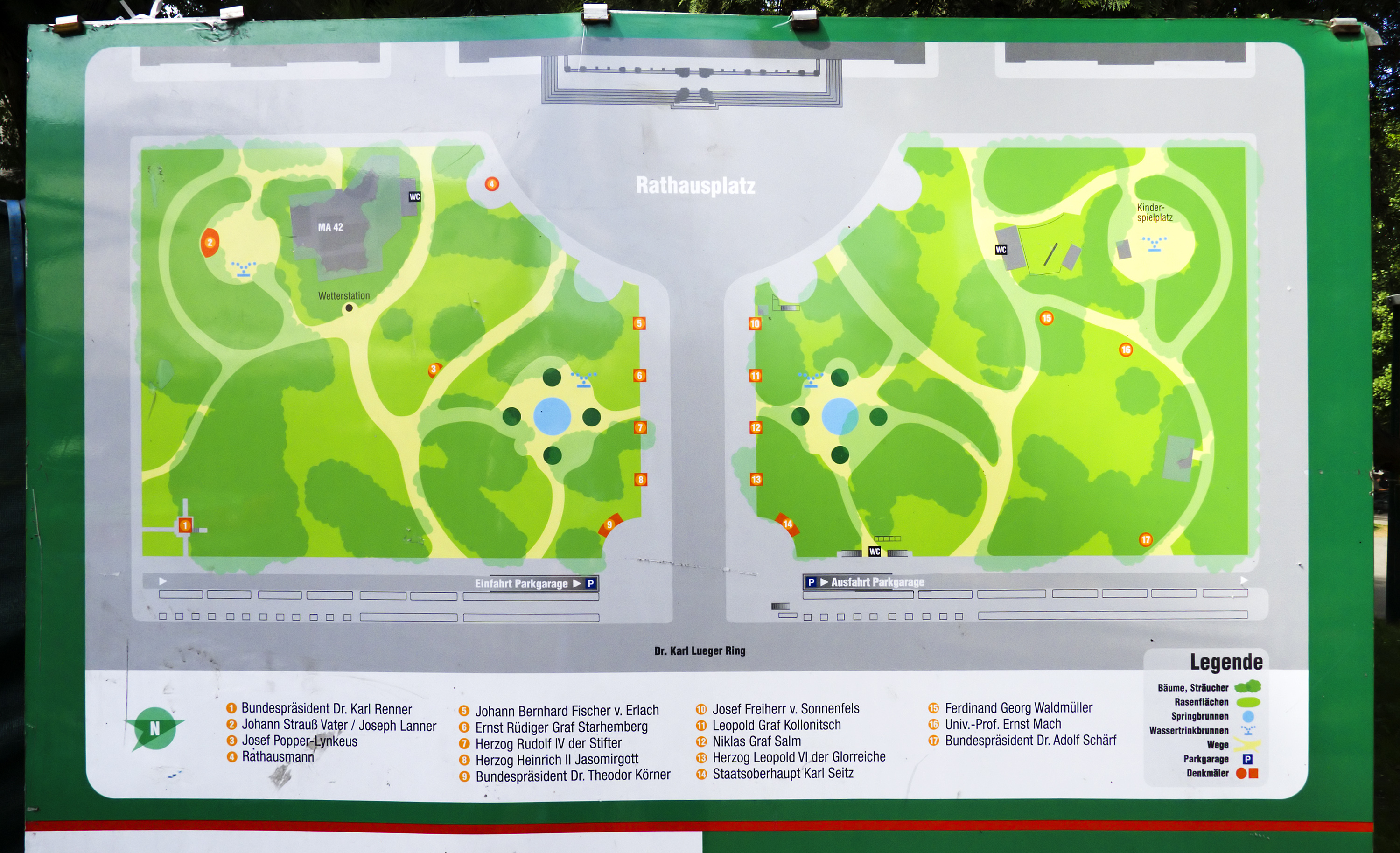
Layout of the park

The park today serves as both a recreational space and a venue for events held at the Rathausplatz, including the Vienna Ice Dream ice-skating rink, an annual film festival, and the Rathaus Christkindlmarkt, Vienna's central Christmas market.

Additionally, the park is home to a variety of exotic plants, such as the Japanese pagoda tree and a ginkgo. These botanical rarities are labeled for identification, and include a beech tree planted to commemorate the 50th anniversary of Emperor Franz Joseph I's reign.

The park is home to several monuments, with the southern area featuring statues of Theodor Körner, Karl Renner, Josef Popper-Lynkeus, Johann Strauss II, Eduard von Bauernfeld, and Joseph Lanner. The northern area contains monuments dedicated to Ferdinand Georg Waldmüller, Ernst Mach, Adolf Schärf, and a memorial to the destruction of Vienna during World War II in 1945.

== Gallery ==
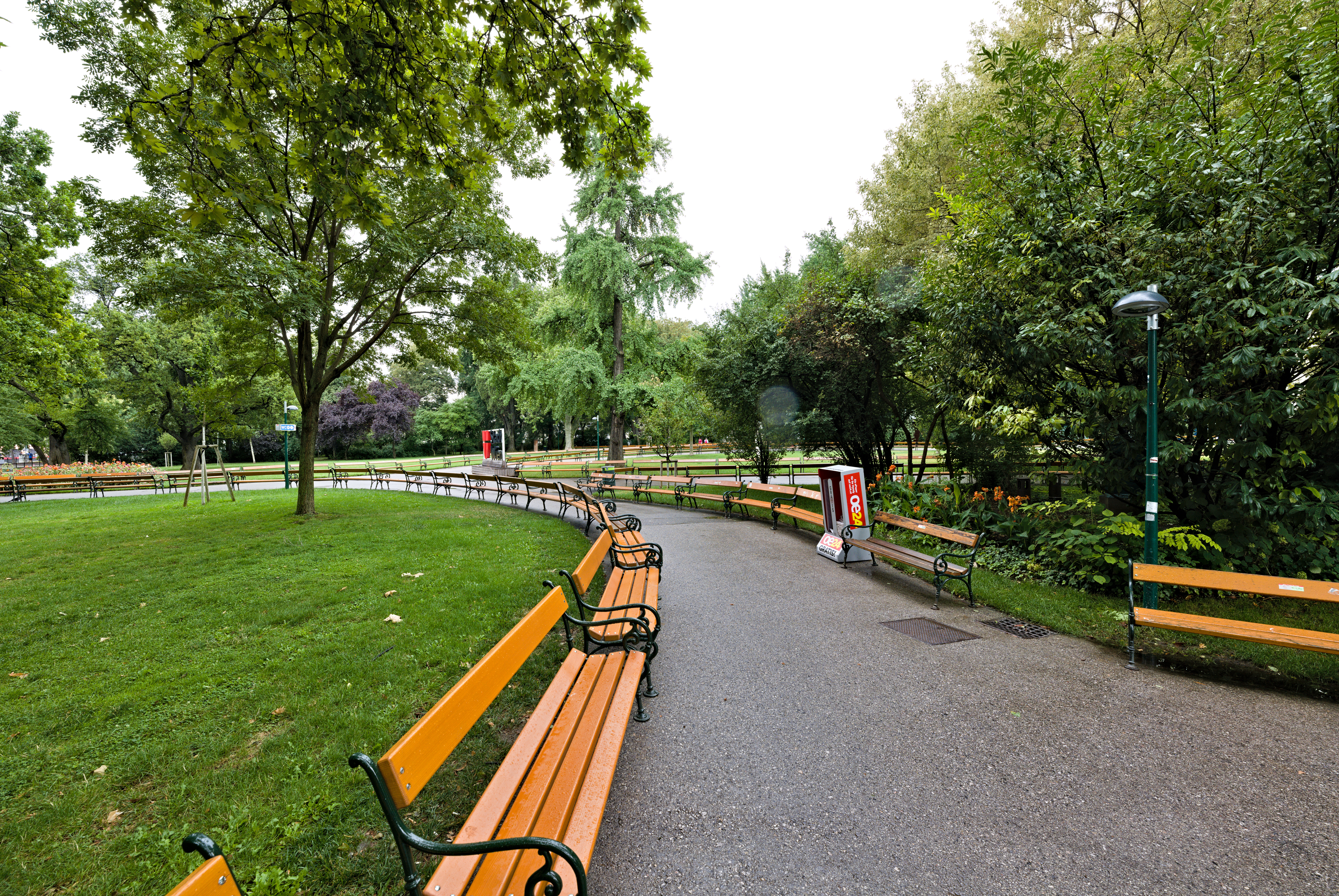
Benches in the park

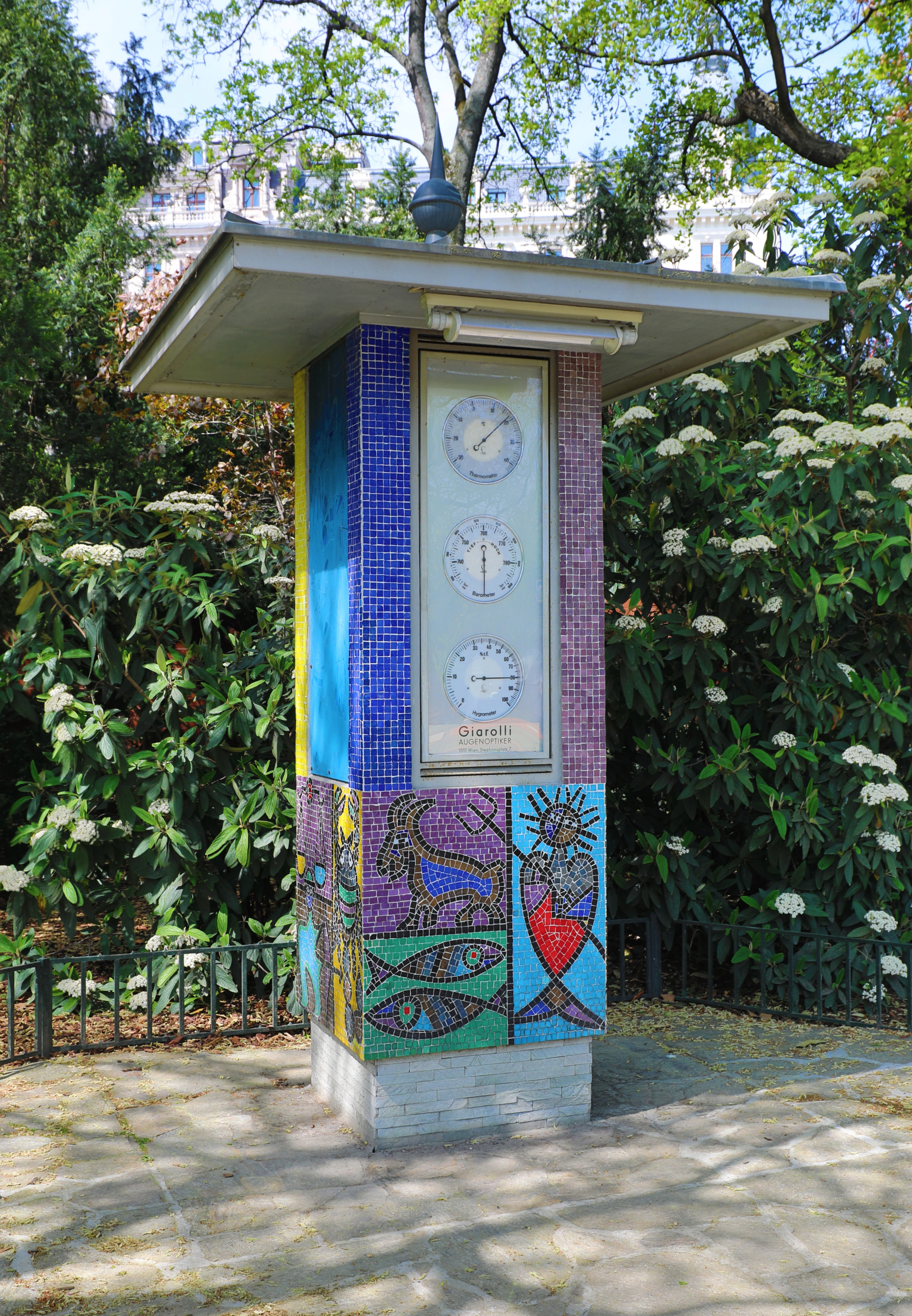
A weather house

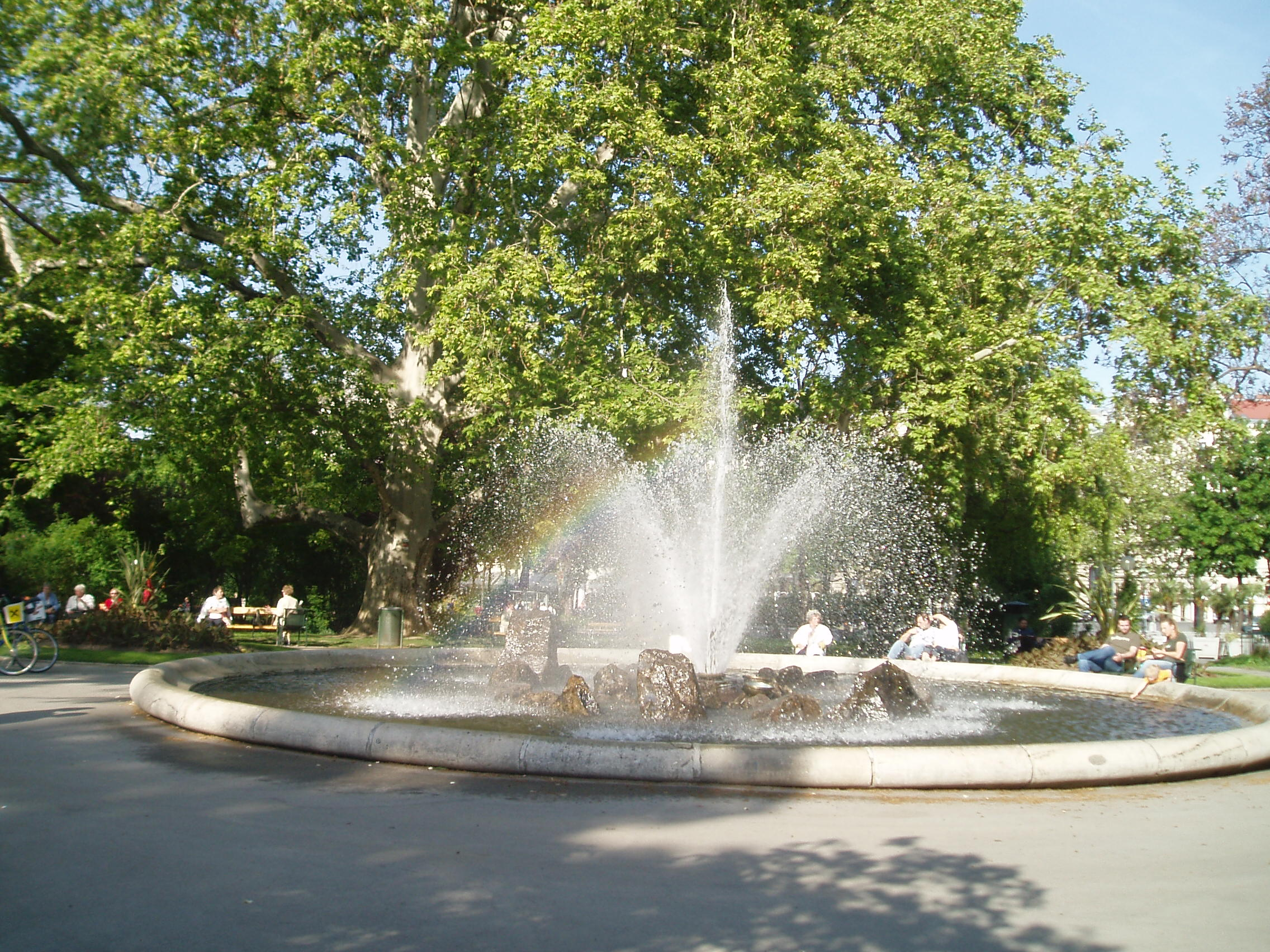
One of the two fountains in the park

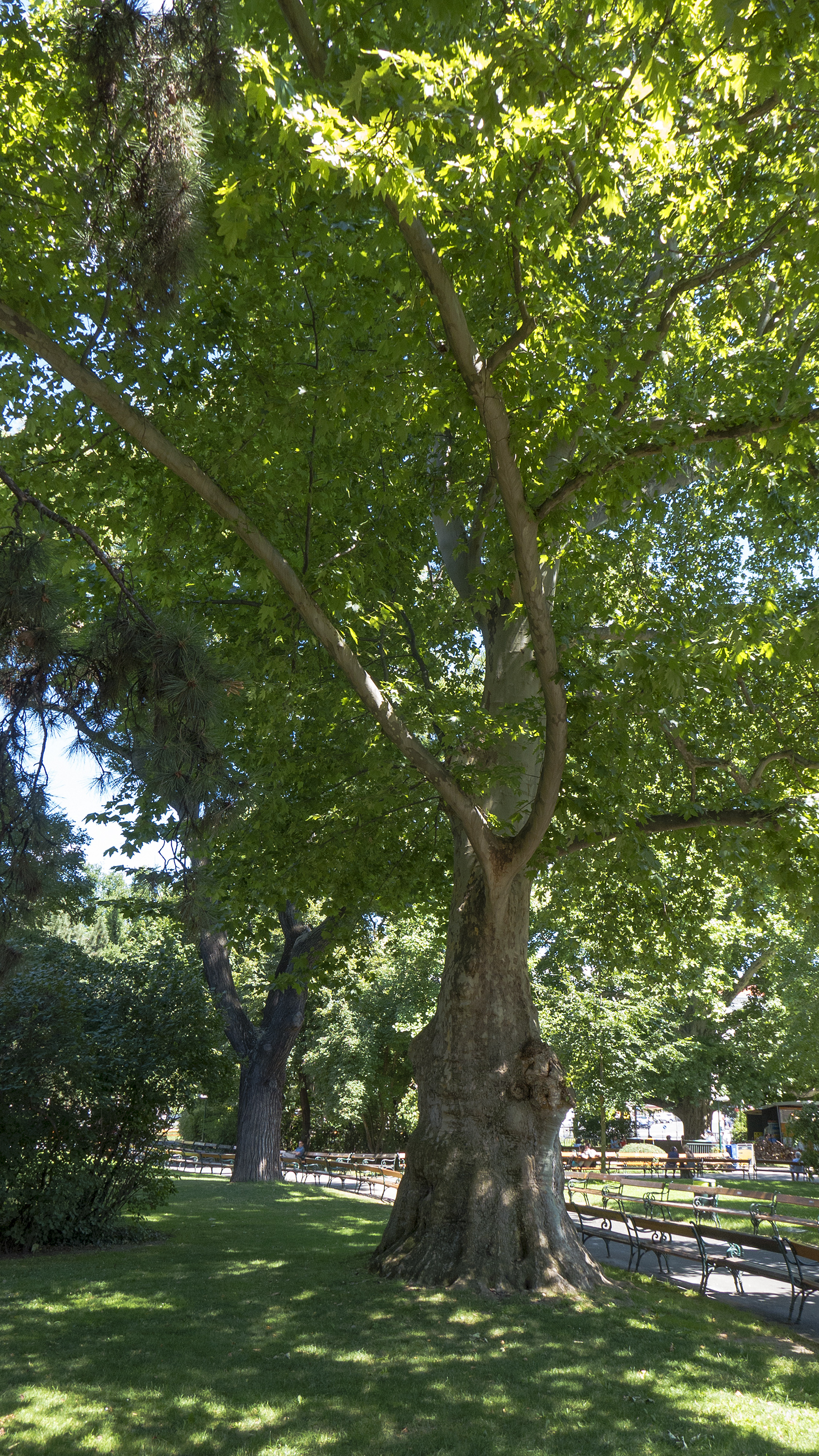
The London plane from 1783

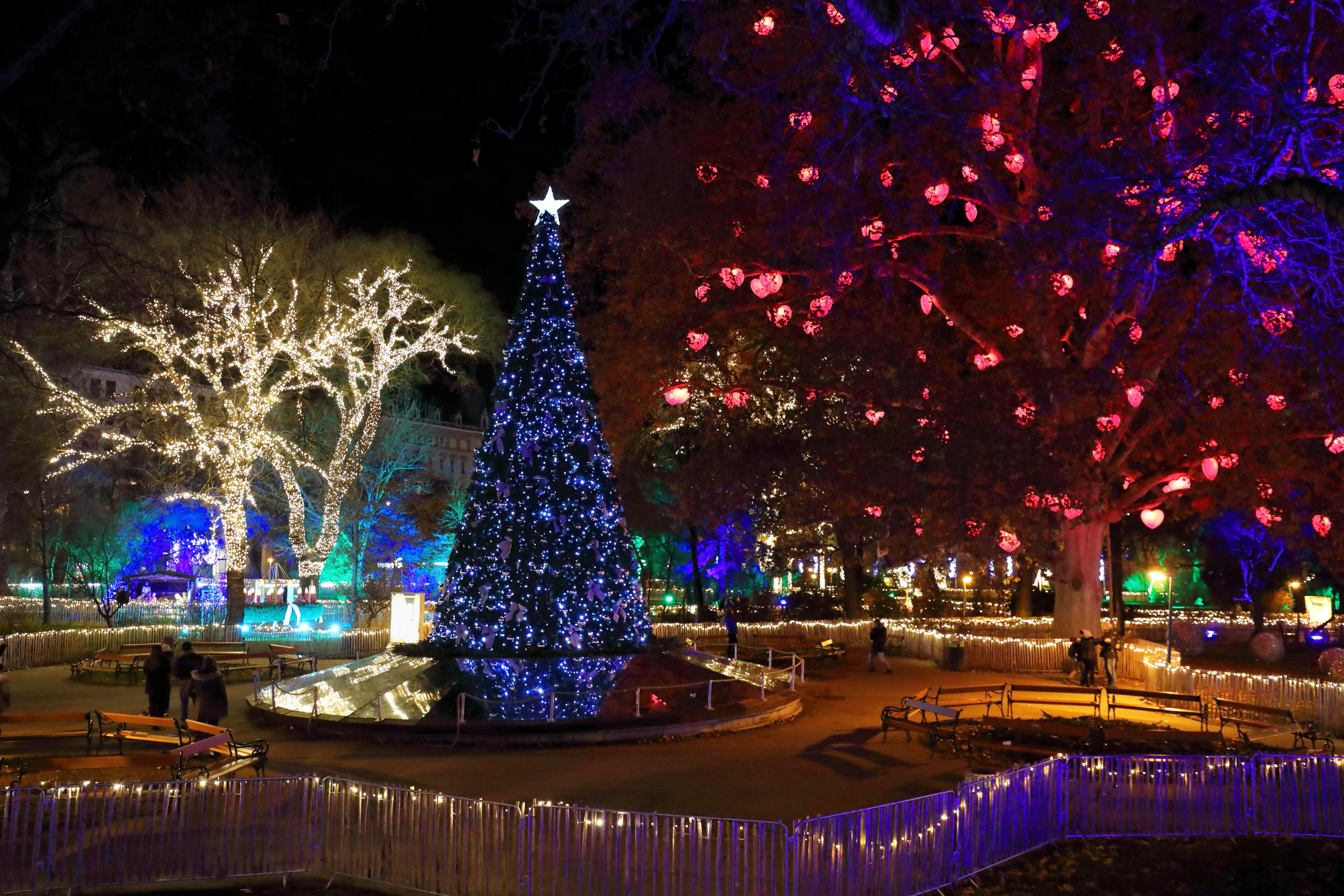
The park at Christmas

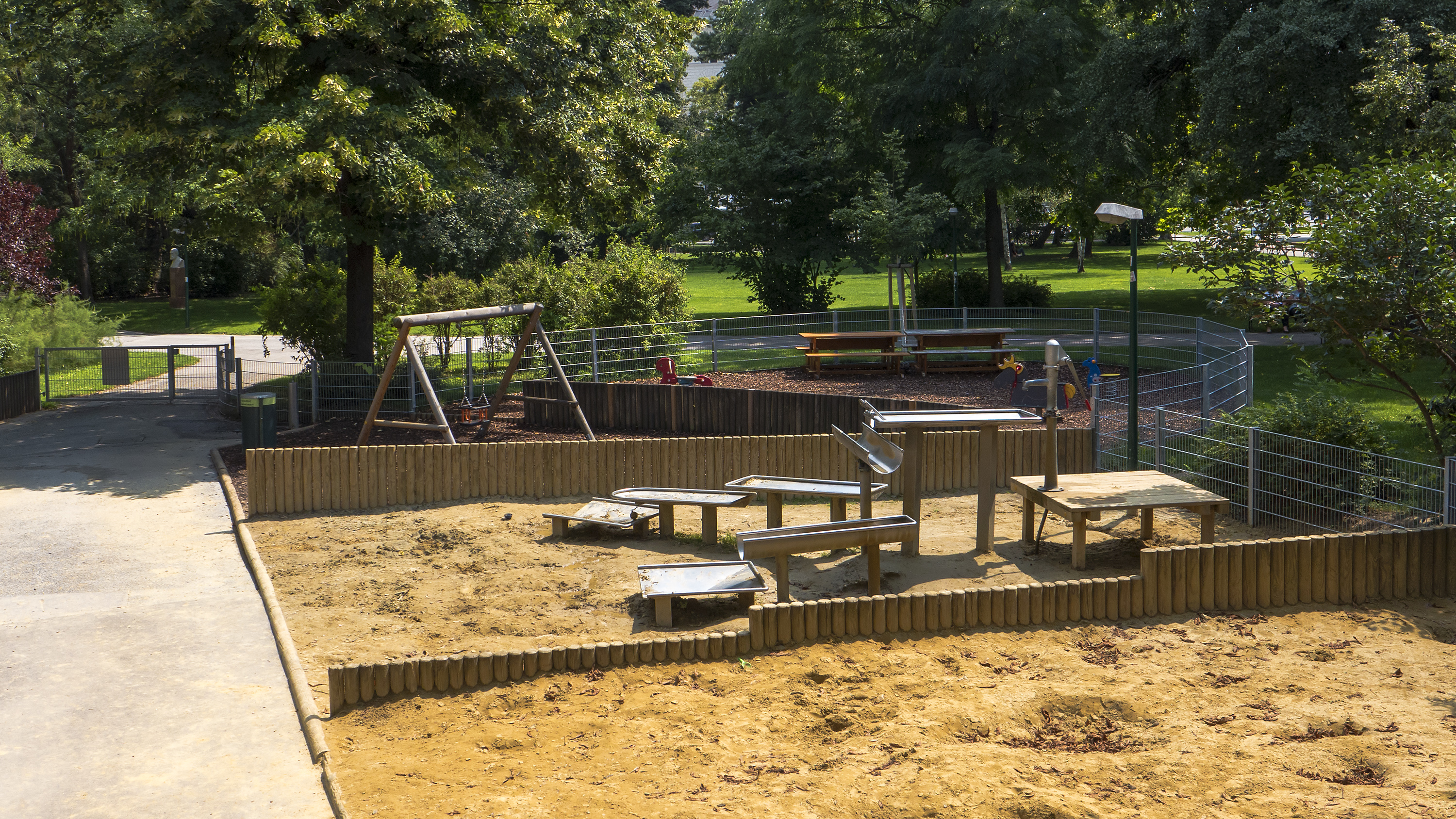
A playground in the park
