= Carnap Papers =

Archive of Rudolf Carnap in Pittsburgh

The Rudolf Carnap Papers are a large collection of documents and photographs that record much of the life and career of German philosopher Rudolf Carnap. They are used by scholars and historians not only for research into his life, but also for research into his theories and the theories of other scholars with whom he corresponded. The Carnap papers are restored, maintained, cataloged and housed in the Archives Service Center, University Library System, University of Pittsburgh. They include extensive correspondence, lecture outlines for courses that he taught, and drafts of his published works and unpublished manuscripts. Much of the content of the Rudolf Carnap papers is available electronically and searchable through the archive. His work on metaphysics being essentially a question of semantics is still cited and have been further expanded by other scholars.

His papers document why he is considered a major contributor to the study of metaphysics. He was also a member of the Vienna Circle.

== History of the collection ==
The papers were donated by Carnap's daughter Hanna Carnap-Thost in 1974.

== Scope of the collection ==
The collection is used by those researching personal information and the subjects covered by the collection. The scope of the collection is quite large and contains information on the following subjects

=== Personal correspondence ===
Those scholars with whom Carnap corresponded.

- Vienna circle
- Herbert Feigl
- Kurt Gödel
- Carl Hempel
- David Kaplan
- Felix Kaufmann
- Charles Morris
- Otto Neurath
- Arne Næss
- C.K. Ogden
- Karl R. Popper
- W.V. Quine
- Hans Reichenbach
- Moritz Schlick
- Wolfgang Stegmüller

=== Work in probability ===
Some of these documents have been digitized. Contents include:

- "Basic System of Inductive Logic"
- Inductive Logic and Rational Decisions
