= Zilsel =

Zilsel is a surname. Notable people with the surname include:

- Edgar Zilsel (1891–1944), Austrian-American historian and philosopher of science

- Zilsel thesis, explanation for why science emerged in Western Europe and not in other places or eras
