= September 16 =

September 16 this year in various calendars
- Wednesday, 16 September 2026
Akan	Nkyiwukuo
Armenian	28 Hoṙi 1476
Aztec	Tititl 9, 3 Ōlīn
Babylonian	3 Ululu, 2337 SE
Balinese pawukon	Menga, Kajeng, Jaya, Umanis, Urukung, Buda of Parangbakat, Guru, Dadi, Suka
Bengali	1 Ashshin, BS 1433
Chinese	Yin Water Snake・Chariot Mansion; Fire Horse Year, Month 8, Day 6 (Bailu, 7 days until Qiufen)
Common Era	16 September 2026 CE
Coptic	6 Thout, AM 1743
Egyptian	3 Mechir, 2775 NE
Ethiopian	6 Maskaram, 2019 Amätä Məhrät
French Republican	Décade III, Décadi de Fructidor de l'Année 234 de la République
Gregorian	16 September, AD 2026
Hebrew	5 Tishrei, AM 5787
Hindu	Viśākhā・Vaidhṛti; Solar: 31 Bhādrapada, 1948 SE; Lunisolar: Pañcamī, Śukla pakṣa of Bhādrapada, 2083 VE; Rāudra・5127 KY・1,872,834
Icelandic	Miðvikudagur, 23 Tvímánuður 2026
Islamic	3 Rabi' al-thani, AH 1448 (using tabular method)
ISO week date	2026-W38-3
Japanese	6 Hazuki, Reiwa 8 (Hakuro, 7 days until Shūbun)
Julian	3 September, AD 2026 (AM 7534)
Julian day	2461300
Korean	6 Dakdal, 4359 DE
Maya	13.0.13.16.17; 10 Chen, 3 Caban
Roman	ante diem III Nonas Septembres, MMDCCLXXIX AUC
Solar Hijri	25 Shahrivar, SH 1405
Tibetan	5 khrums, me pho rta 2153 or 1772 or 1000

<<	September					>>
Su	Mo	Tu	We	Th	Fr	Sa
		1	2	3	4	5
6	7	8	9	10	11	12
13	14	15	16	17	18	19
20	21	22	23	24	25	26
27	28	29	30
2026

September 16 in recent years
2026 (Wednesday)
2025 (Tuesday)
2024 (Monday)
2023 (Saturday)
2022 (Friday)
2021 (Thursday)
2020 (Wednesday)
2019 (Monday)
2018 (Sunday)
2017 (Saturday)

September 16 is the 259th day of the year (260th in leap years) in the Gregorian calendar; 106 days remain until the end of the year.

== Events ==
=== Pre-1600 ===
- 681 – Pope Honorius I is posthumously excommunicated by the Sixth Ecumenical Council.
- 1400 – Owain Glyndŵr is declared Prince of Wales by his followers.
- 1410 – Ferdinand of Trastámara takes Antequera from the emirate of Granada.

=== 1601–1900 ===
- 1620 – Pilgrims set sail for Virginia from Plymouth, England in the Mayflower.
- 1701 – James Francis Edward Stuart, sometimes called the "Old Pretender", becomes the Jacobite claimant to the thrones of England and Scotland on the death of his father, James II.
- 1732 – In Campo Maior, Portugal, a storm hits the Armory and a violent explosion ensues, killing two-thirds of its inhabitants.
- 1776 – American Revolutionary War: American forces win the Battle of Harlem Heights after General George Washington orders a counterattack on advancing British light infantry.
- 1779 – American Revolutionary War: The Franco-American Siege of Savannah begins.
- 1810 – With the Grito de Dolores, Father Miguel Hidalgo begins Mexico's fight for independence from Spain.
- 1822 – French physicist Augustin-Jean Fresnel, in a "note" read to the Academy of Sciences, reports a direct refraction experiment verifying David Brewster's hypothesis that photoelasticity (as it is now known) is stress-induced birefringence.
- 1863 – Robert College, in Istanbul, the first American educational institution outside the United States, is founded by Christopher Robert, an American philanthropist.
- 1880 – The Cornell Daily Sun prints its first issue in Ithaca, New York.
- 1893 – Settlers make a land run for prime land in the Cherokee Strip in Oklahoma.

=== 1901–present ===
- 1908 – The General Motors Corporation is founded.
- 1914 – World War I: The Siege of Przemyśl (present-day Poland) begins.
- 1920 – The Wall Street bombing: A bomb in a horse wagon explodes in front of the J. P. Morgan building in New York City killing 38 and injuring 400.
- 1940 – World War II: Italian troops conquer Sidi Barrani.
- 1943 – World War II: The German Tenth Army reports that it can no longer contain the Allied bridgehead around Salerno.
- 1945 – World War II: The Japanese occupation of Hong Kong comes to an end.
- 1953 – American Airlines Flight 723 crashes in Colonie, New York, killing 28 people.
- 1955 – The military coup to unseat President Juan Perón of Argentina is launched at midnight.
- 1955 – A Soviet Zulu-class submarine becomes the first to launch a ballistic missile.
- 1956 – TCN-9 Sydney is the first Australian television station to commence regular broadcasts.
- 1959 – The first successful photocopier, the Xerox 914, is introduced in a demonstration on live television from New York City.
- 1961 – The United States National Hurricane Research Project drops eight cylinders of silver iodide into the eyewall of Hurricane Esther. Wind speed reduces by 10%, giving rise to Project Stormfury.
- 1961 – Typhoon Nancy, with possibly the strongest winds ever measured in a tropical cyclone, makes landfall in Osaka, Japan, killing 173 people.
- 1961 – Pakistan establishes its Space and Upper Atmosphere Research Commission with Abdus Salam as its head.
- 1963 – Malaysia is formed from the Federation of Malaya, Singapore, North Borneo (Sabah) and Sarawak. However, Singapore is soon expelled from this new country.
- 1966 – The Metropolitan Opera House opens at Lincoln Center in New York City with the world premiere of Samuel Barber's opera Antony and Cleopatra.
- 1970 – King Hussein of Jordan declares war against the Palestine Liberation Organization, the conflict came to be known as Black September.
- 1975 – Papua New Guinea gains independence from Australia.
- 1975 – Cape Verde, Mozambique, and São Tomé and Príncipe join the United Nations.
- 1975 – The first prototype of the Mikoyan MiG-31 interceptor makes its maiden flight.
- 1976 – Armenian champion swimmer Shavarsh Karapetyan saves 20 people from a trolleybus that had fallen into a Yerevan reservoir.
- 1976 – Night of the Pencils: In the city of La Plata, Argentina, a group of high-school students were kidnapped and later tortured, raped and murdered during the Argentinian military dictatorship
- 1978 – The 7.4 M_{w} Tabas earthquake affects the city of Tabas, Iran with a maximum Mercalli intensity of IX (Violent). At least 15,000 people are killed.
- 1979 – Eight people escape from East Germany to the west in a homemade hot air balloon.
- 1979 – The Sugarhill Gang released their first single, Rapper's Delight.
- 1982 – Lebanon War: The Sabra and Shatila massacre in Lebanon takes place.
- 1987 – The Montreal Protocol is signed to protect the ozone layer from depletion.
- 1990 – The railroad between the People's Republic of China and Kazakhstan is completed at Dostyk, adding a sizable link to the concept of the Eurasian Land Bridge.
- 1992 – The trial of the deposed Panamanian dictator Manuel Noriega ends in the United States with a 40-year sentence for drug trafficking and money laundering.
- 1992 – Black Wednesday: The British pound is forced out of the European Exchange Rate Mechanism by currency speculators and is forced to devalue against the German mark.
- 1994 – The British government lifts the broadcasting ban imposed against members of Sinn Féin and Irish paramilitary groups in 1988.
- 1996 – Space Shuttle Atlantis is launched on STS-79 to dock with the Russian space station Mir.
- 2004 – Hurricane Ivan makes landfall in Gulf Shores, Alabama as a Category 3 hurricane.
- 2005 – The Camorra organized crime boss Paolo Di Lauro is arrested in Naples, Italy.
- 2007 – One-Two-Go Airlines Flight 269 carrying 130 crew and passengers crashes in Thailand, killing 90 people.
- 2007 – Security guards working for Blackwater Worldwide shoot and kill 17 Iraqis in Nisour Square, Baghdad.
- 2013 – A gunman kills twelve people at the Washington Navy Yard in Washington, D.C.
- 2014 – The Islamic State of Iraq and the Levant launches its Kobani offensive against Syrian–Kurdish forces.
- 2015 – A 8.3 M_{w} earthquake strikes the Chilean city of Illapel, killing 15 people, injuring at least 34, leaving at least six missing, and causing extensive damage. One person also dies in Argentina.
- 2021 – A 6.0 M_{w} earthquake strikes Lu County, Sichuan, China, killing three and injuring more than 88.
- 2021 – Inspiration4, the first private orbital crewed spaceflight, is launched from the Kennedy Space Center.
- 2022 – During the Let Yet Kone massacre, the Burmese military kills 13 villagers, including eight children, after attacking a school in Sagaing Region, Myanmar.
- 2022 – The death of Mahsa Amini occurred in Tehran, Iran, sparking worldwide protests.

== Births ==
=== Pre-1600 ===
- AD 16 – Julia Drusilla, Roman daughter of Germanicus (died 38)
- 508 – Yuan Di, emperor of the Liang dynasty (died 555)
- 1295 – Elizabeth de Clare, English noblewoman (died 1360)
- 1386 – Henry V of England (died 1422)
- 1462 – Pietro Pomponazzi, Italian philosopher (died 1525)
- 1507 – Jiajing Emperor of China (died 1567)
- 1541 – Walter Devereux, 1st Earl of Essex, English nobleman (died 1576)
- 1557 – Jacques Mauduit, French composer (died 1627)

=== 1601–1900 ===
- 1615 – Heinrich Bach, German organist and composer (died 1692)
- 1625 – Gregorio Barbarigo, Roman Catholic saint (died 1697)
- 1651 – Engelbert Kaempfer, German physician and botanist (died 1716)
- 1666 – Antoine Parent, French mathematician and theorist (died 1716)
- 1678 – Henry St John, 1st Viscount Bolingbroke, English philosopher and politician, Secretary of State for the Southern Department (died 1751)
- 1716 – Angelo Maria Amorevoli, Italian tenor and actor (died 1798)
- 1722 – Gabriel Christie, Scottish-Canadian general (died 1799)
- 1725 – Nicolas Desmarest, French geologist, zoologist, and author (died 1815)
- 1745 – Mikhail Kutuzov, Russian field marshal (died 1813)
- 1777 – Nathan Mayer Rothschild, German-English banker and financier (died 1836)
- 1782 – Daoguang Emperor of China (died 1850)
- 1812 – Anna Louisa Geertruida Bosboom-Toussaint, Dutch novelist (died 1886)
- 1822 – Charles Crocker, American businessman (died 1888)
- 1823 – Francis Parkman, American historian and author (died 1893)
- 1823 – Ludwik Teichmann, Polish anatomist (died 1895)
- 1827 – Jean Albert Gaudry, French geologist and paleontologist (died 1908)
- 1828 – Per Pålsson, Swedish murderer (died 1914)
- 1830 – Patrick Francis Moran, Irish-Australian cardinal (died 1911)
- 1837 – Pedro V of Portugal (died 1861)
- 1838 – James J. Hill, Canadian-American railroad executive (died 1916)
- 1844 – Paul Taffanel, French flute player and conductor (died 1908)
- 1846 – Anna Kingsford, English author, poet, and activist (died 1888)
- 1853 – Albrecht Kossel, German physician and biochemist, Nobel Prize laureate (died 1927)
- 1858 – Edward Marshall Hall, English lawyer and politician (died 1927)
- 1858 – Bonar Law, Canadian-Scottish banker and politician, Prime Minister of the United Kingdom (died 1923)
- 1859 – Yuan Shikai, Chinese general and politician, President of the Republic of China (died 1916)
- 1861 – Miriam Benjamin, African-American educator and inventor (died 1947)
- 1866 – Georg Voigt, German lawyer and politician, Mayor of Marburg (died 1927)
- 1870 – John Pius Boland, Irish tennis player and politician (died 1958)
- 1875 – James Cash Penney, American businessman and philanthropist, founded J. C. Penney (died 1971)
- 1876 – Marvin Hart, American boxer (died 1931)
- 1877 – Jacob Schick, American-Canadian inventor and businessman, founded Schick Razors (died 1937)
- 1878 – Karl Albiker, German sculptor, lithographer, and educator (died 1961)
- 1880 – Clara Ayres, American nurse (died 1917)
- 1880 – Alfred Noyes, English author, poet, and playwright (died 1958)
- 1881 – Clive Bell, English philosopher and critic (died 1964)
- 1883 – T. E. Hulme, English poet and critic (died 1917)
- 1886 – Jean Arp, Alsatian sculptor and painter (died 1966)
- 1887 – Nadia Boulanger, French composer and educator (died 1979)
- 1888 – W. O. Bentley, English race car driver and engineer, founded Bentley Motors Limited (died 1971)
- 1888 – Frans Eemil Sillanpää, Finnish author, Nobel Prize laureate (died 1964)
- 1890 – Avigdor Hameiri, Israeli author (died 1970)
- 1891 – Karl Dönitz, German admiral and politician, President of Germany (died 1980)
- 1891 – Stephanie von Hohenlohe, Austrian-German spy (died 1972)
- 1893 – Alexander Korda, Hungarian-English director, producer, and screenwriter (died 1956)
- 1893 – Albert Szent-Györgyi, Hungarian-American physiologist and biochemist, Nobel Prize laureate (died 1986)
- 1895 – Zainal Abidin Ahmad, Malaysian author and scholar (died 1973)
- 1897 – Milt Franklyn, American composer (died 1962)
- 1898 – H. A. Rey, American author and illustrator, co-created Curious George (died 1977)
- 1899 – Hans Swarowsky, Hungarian-Austrian conductor and educator (died 1975)

=== 1901–present ===
- 1901 – Josef Schächter, Austrian rabbi and philosopher from the Vienna Circle (died 1994)
- 1905 – Vladimír Holan, Czech poet and author (died 1980)
- 1906 – Jack Churchill, Sri Lankan-British colonel (died 1996)
- 1910 – Erich Kempka, German colonel and chauffeur (died 1975)
- 1910 – Karl Kling, German race car driver and manager (died 2003)
- 1911 – Wilfred Burchett, Australian journalist and author (died 1983)
- 1911 – Paul Henning, American screenwriter and producer (died 2005)
- 1914 – Allen Funt, American director, producer, and screenwriter (died 1999)
- 1915 – Cy Walter, American pianist (died 1968)
- 1916 – Robert Llewellyn Bradshaw, Caribbean politician, 1st Prime Minister of Saint Kitts and Nevis (died 1978)
- 1916 – Frank Farrell, Australian rugby league player and policeman (died 1985)
- 1916 – M. S. Subbulakshmi, Indian Carnatic vocalist (died 2004)
- 1916 – Frank Leslie Walcott, Barbadian cricketer, umpire, and politician (died 1999)
- 1916 – Marie Vieux-Chauvet, Haitian writer (died 1973)
- 1916 – Raosaheb Gogte, Indian industrialist (died 2000)
- 1918 – Władysław Kędra, Polish pianist (died 1968)
- 1919 – Bill Daley, American football player and sportscaster (died 2015)
- 1919 – Laurence J. Peter, Canadian-American hierarchiologist and educator (died 1990)
- 1919 – Andy Russell, American singer and actor (died 1992)
- 1920 – Staryl C. Austin, American air force general (died 2015)
- 1920 – Sheila Quinn, English nurse and educator (died 2016)
- 1920 – Art Sansom, American cartoonist (died 1991)
- 1921 – Ursula Franklin, German-Canadian metallurgist (died 2016)
- 1921 – Jon Hendricks, American singer-songwriter (died 2017)
- 1921 – Korla Pandit, American pianist and composer (died 1998)
- 1922 – Guy Hamilton, French-English director and screenwriter (died 2016)
- 1922 – Janis Paige, American actress and singer (died 2024)
- 1923 – Lee Kuan Yew, Singaporean lawyer and politician, 1st Prime Minister of Singapore (died 2015)
- 1924 – Lauren Bacall, American actress (died 2014)
- 1924 – Raoul Coutard, French cinematographer and director (died 2016)
- 1925 – Charlie Byrd, American singer and guitarist (died 1999)
- 1925 – Charles Haughey, Irish accountant, lawyer, and politician, 7th Taoiseach of Ireland (died 2006)
- 1925 – B.B. King, American singer-songwriter, guitarist, and producer (died 2015)
- 1926 – Eric Gross, Austrian-Australian pianist and composer (died 2011)
- 1926 – John Knowles, American novelist (died 2001)
- 1926 – Roger McKee, American baseball player (died 2014)
- 1926 – Robert H. Schuller, American pastor and author (died 2015)
- 1927 – Peter Falk, American actor (died 2011)
- 1927 – Jack Kelly, American actor and politician (died 1992)
- 1927 – Sadako Ogata, Japanese academic and diplomat, United Nations High Commissioner for Refugees (died 2019)
- 1928 – Rex Trailer, American television host, actor, and singer (died 2013)
- 1928 – Lady Gwen Thompson, English author and educator (died 1986)
- 1928 – Patricia Wald, American judge (died 2019)
- 1929 – Jamshid bin Abdullah of Zanzibar, last sultan of Zanzibar (died 2024)
- 1929 – Stan Stephens, Canadian-American politician, 20th Governor of Montana (died 2021)
- 1930 – Anne Francis, American actress (died 2011)
- 1931 – K. D. Arulpragasam, Sri Lankan zoologist and academic (died 2003)
- 1931 – Little Willie Littlefield, American-Dutch singer-songwriter and pianist (died 2013)
- 1932 – George Chakiris, American actor
- 1932 – Micky Stewart, English cricketer and coach
- 1933 – Steve Shirley, German-English businesswoman and philanthropist, founded Xansa (died 2025)
- 1934 – Elgin Baylor, American basketball player and coach (died 2021)
- 1934 – Ronnie Drew, Irish singer-songwriter and guitarist (died 2008)
- 1935 – Carl Andre, American sculptor (died 2024)
- 1935 – Billy Boy Arnold, American singer-songwriter and guitarist
- 1935 – Jules Bass, American director, producer, composer, and author (died 2022)
- 1935 – Lilia Cuntapay, Filipino actress (died 2016)
- 1935 – Bob Kiley, American-English businessman (died 2016)
- 1935 – Esther Vilar, Argentinian-German author and playwright
- 1935 – Helen Williams, American fashion model (died 2023)
- 1937 – Aleksandr Medved, Russian wrestler (died 2024)
- 1937 – Vince Naimoli, American businessman and philanthropist (died 2019)
- 1939 – Breyten Breytenbach, South African-French poet and painter (died 2024)
- 1939 – Bill McGill, American basketball player (died 2014)
- 1940 – Hamiet Bluiett, American jazz saxophonist and composer (died 2018)
- 1940 – Butch Buchholz, American tennis player
- 1940 – Paul White, Baron Hanningfield, British life peer (died 2024)
- 1941 – Joe Butler, American singer, autoharp player, and drummer
- 1941 – Richard Perle, American political scientist and politician
- 1942 – Bernie Calvert, English bass player and keyboard player
- 1942 – Susan L. Graham, American computer scientist and academic
- 1943 – Wang Houjun, Chinese footballer and manager (died 2012)
- 1943 – James Alan McPherson, American short story writer and essayist (died 2016)
- 1944 – Linda Kaye Henning, American actress
- 1944 – Betty Kelly, American soul/R&B singer
- 1946 – Sonny LeMaire, American country music singer-songwriter and bass player
- 1946 – Mike Reynolds, Australian lawyer and politician
- 1946 – Camilo Sesto, Spanish singer-songwriter and producer (died 2019)
- 1947 – Dusty Hughes, English director and playwright
- 1948 – Ron Blair, American bass player
- 1948 – Rosemary Casals, American tennis player and sportscaster
- 1948 – Julia Donaldson, English author and playwright
- 1948 – Kenney Jones, English drummer
- 1948 – Susan Ruttan, American actress
- 1949 – Ed Begley Jr., American actor and environmental activist
- 1950 – David Bellamy, American singer-songwriter and guitarist
- 1950 – Henry Louis Gates Jr., American historian, scholar, and journalist
- 1950 – Loyd Grossman, American-English singer, guitarist, and television host
- 1951 – Vince Bell, American singer-songwriter and guitarist
- 1951 – Andy Irvine, Scottish rugby player and coach
- 1951 – Cornelius Sim, Bruneian cardinal (died 2021)
- 1952 – Tony Cunningham, English educator and politician
- 1952 – Česlovas Laurinavičius, Lithuanian historian
- 1952 – Karen Muir, South African swimmer and physician (died 2013)
- 1952 – Mickey Rourke, American boxer and actor
- 1953 – Kurt Fuller, American character actor
- 1953 – Alan Barton, English singer and guitarist (died 1995)
- 1953 – Nancy Huston, Canadian-American author and translator
- 1953 – Earl Klugh, American musician
- 1953 – Mark Malloch Brown, Baron Malloch-Brown, English journalist and politician, 2nd Deputy Secretary-General of the United Nations
- 1953 – Jerry Pate, American golfer and sportscaster
- 1953 – Manuel Pellegrini, Chilean footballer and manager
- 1953 – Christopher Rich, American actor
- 1953 – Eric Vail, Canadian ice hockey player and sportscaster
- 1954 – Sanjoy Bandopadhyay, Indian sitar player and composer
- 1954 – William McKeen, American author and academic
- 1954 – Colin Newman, English singer-songwriter, guitarist and producer
- 1954 – Frank Reed, American singer-songwriter (died 2014)
- 1954 – Roger Woolley, Australian cricketer
- 1955 – Ron Brewer, American basketball player
- 1955 – Robin Yount, American baseball player and coach
- 1956 – Maggie Atkinson, English educator and civil servant
- 1956 – David Copperfield, American magician and actor
- 1956 – Ross Greenberg, American journalist and antivirus pioneer (died 2017)
- 1956 – Dave Schulthise, American bass player (died 2004)
- 1956 – Kazuharu Sonoda, Japanese wrestler (died 1987)
- 1957 – D. C. Drake, American wrestler
- 1957 – Clara Furse, English businesswoman
- 1957 – Norman Lamb, English lawyer and politician
- 1957 – David McCreery, Northern Irish footballer and manager
- 1957 – Anca Parghel, Romanian singer and pianist (died 2008)
- 1958 – Orel Hershiser, American baseball player and coach
- 1958 – Neville Southall, Welsh footballer and manager
- 1958 – Jennifer Tilly, American actress and poker player
- 1959 – Peter Keleghan, Canadian actor and screenwriter
- 1959 – Tim Raines, American baseball player, coach, and manager
- 1959 – Dave Richardson, South African cricketer, manager, and lawyer
- 1959 – Victory Tischler-Blue, American bass player, director, and producer
- 1960 – Jayne Brook, American actress
- 1960 – Graham Haynes, American trumpet player and composer
- 1960 – Mike Mignola, American author and illustrator
- 1961 – Bilinda Butcher, English singer-songwriter and guitarist
- 1961 – Philip Lafon, Canadian wrestler
- 1961 – Annamária Szalai, Hungarian journalist, economist, and politician (died 2013)
- 1962 – Seth, Canadian author and illustrator
- 1963 – Richard Marx, American singer-songwriter and producer
- 1964 – Mary Coustas, Australian actress and screenwriter
- 1964 – Rossy de Palma, Spanish-French model and actress
- 1964 – Dave Sabo, American guitarist and songwriter
- 1964 – Molly Shannon, American actress, comedian and producer
- 1965 – Katy Kurtzman, American actress and producer
- 1965 – Karl-Heinz Riedle, German footballer and manager
- 1965 – Stephen Shareaux, American singer-songwriter
- 1966 – John Bel Edwards, American attorney and politician
- 1966 – Wil McCarthy, American author and playwright
- 1966 – Kevin Young, American hurdler
- 1967 – Hiroya Oku, Japanese author and illustrator
- 1967 – Damon Thayer, Kentucky State Senate Majority Leader
- 1968 – Marc Anthony, American singer-songwriter, actor, and producer
- 1968 – Walt Becker, American director, producer, and screenwriter
- 1968 – Tommy Keane, Irish footballer (died 2012)
- 1969 – Justine Frischmann, English singer-songwriter and guitarist
- 1969 – Janno Gibbs, Filipino singer-songwriter and actor
- 1970 – Mark Schultz, American singer-songwriter
- 1971 – Joel Heyman, American actor, producer, and screenwriter
- 1971 – Charlie Jacobs, American businessman
- 1971 – Amy Poehler, American actress, comedian, and producer
- 1971 – Richard Slinger, American wrestler
- 1971 – Shawntel Smith, American beauty pageant contestant
- 1972 – Mark Bruener, American football player
- 1972 – Mike Doyle, American actor and producer
- 1972 – Alessandro Nunziati, Italian singer-songwriter and producer
- 1973 – George Corrie, English footballer
- 1973 – Camiel Eurlings, Dutch businessman and member of the International Olympic Committee
- 1973 – Justin Haythe, American author and screenwriter
- 1973 – Alexander Vinokourov, Kazakh cyclist and manager
- 1974 – Loona, Dutch singer-songwriter and dancer
- 1974 – Monique Brumby, Australian singer-songwriter, guitarist, and producer
- 1974 – Joaquin Castro, American lawyer and politician
- 1974 – Julian Castro, American lawyer and politician, 16th United States Secretary of Housing and Urban Development
- 1975 – Jason Leffler, American race car driver (died 2013)
- 1975 – Shannon Noll, Australian singer-songwriter
- 1975 – Toks Olagundoye, Nigerian actress
- 1976 – Elīna Garanča, Latvian soprano
- 1976 – Tina Barrett, English singer-songwriter, dancer, and actress
- 1976 – Greg Buckner, American basketball player and coach
- 1977 – Gregory Ball, American captain and politician
- 1977 – Musiq Soulchild, American singer-songwriter
- 1978 – Dan Dickau, American basketball player and coach
- 1978 – Claudia Marx, German runner
- 1978 – Sensei, Mexican wrestler
- 1978 – Brian Sims, American lawyer, politician, and LGBT activist
- 1979 – Bobby Korecky, American baseball player
- 1979 – Flo Rida, American rapper, singer, and songwriter
- 1980 – Kenny van Weeghel, Dutch wheelchair racer
- 1981 – Fan Bingbing, Chinese actress, singer, and producer
- 1981 – Alexis Bledel, American actress
- 1981 – LaVerne Jones-Ferrette, Virgin Islander sprinter
- 1982 – Leon Knight, English footballer
- 1982 – Michele Rizzo, Italian rugby player
- 1983 – John Afoa, New Zealand rugby player
- 1983 – Katerine Avgoustakis, Belgian singer and pianist
- 1983 – Jennifer Blake, Canadian wrestler
- 1983 – Kirsty Coventry, Zimbabwean swimmer and 10th President of the International Olympic Committee
- 1983 – Brandon Moss, American baseball player
- 1984 – Sabrina Bryan, American singer-songwriter, dancer, and actress
- 1984 – Katie Melua, Georgian-English singer-songwriter and guitarist
- 1985 – Matt Harrison, American baseball player
- 1985 – Max Minghella, English actor
- 1985 – Madeline Zima, American actress
- 1986 – Gordon Beckham, American baseball player
- 1986 – Ian Harding, American actor
- 1986 – Kyla Pratt, American actress and singer
- 1987 – Merve Boluğur, Turkish actress
- 1987 – Kyle Lafferty, Northern Irish footballer
- 1987 – Louis Ngwat-Mahop, Cameroonian footballer
- 1987 – Anthony Padilla, American internet personality and filmmaker
- 1987 – Burry Stander, South African cyclist (died 2013)
- 1987 – Travis Wall, American dancer and choreographer
- 1988 – Teddy Geiger, American singer-songwriter, guitarist, and actress
- 1989 – Robbie Grossman, American baseball player
- 1989 – Braden Holtby, Canadian ice hockey player
- 1989 – Salomón Rondón, Venezuelan footballer
- 1989 – Dustin Tokarski, Canadian ice hockey player
- 1991 – Alexandra Paul, Canadian figure skater (died 2023)
- 1992 – Vytenis Čižauskas, Lithuanian basketball player
- 1992 – Nick Jonas, American singer-songwriter and guitarist
- 1992 – Jake Roche, English singer-songwriter and actor
- 1992 – Chase Stokes, American actor
- 1993 – Metro Boomin, American record producer and songwriter
- 1993 – Sam Byram, English footballer
- 1993 – Bryson DeChambeau, American golfer
- 1993 – Joji, Japanese-Australian singer-songwriter
- 1994 – Anthony Mantha, Canadian ice hockey player
- 1994 – Aleksandar Mitrović, Serbian footballer
- 1994 – Mitchell Moses, Australian rugby league player
- 1995 – Aaron Gordon, American basketball player
- 1997 – Clint Ratkovich, American football player
- 1997 – Anairis Quiñones, American voice actress
- 1997 – Jackie Young, American basketball player
- 1999 – Brady Tkachuk, American ice hockey player
- 2000 – Sam Howell, American football player
- 2000 – Oliver Skipp, English footballer
- 2001 – Avishag Semberg, Israeli Olympic taekwondo bronze medalist
- 2003 – Ryan Couchman, Australian rugby league player
- 2003 – Toby Couchman, Australian rugby league player

== Deaths ==
=== Pre-1600 ===
- 307 – Flavius Valerius Severus, Roman emperor
- 655 – Pope Martin I
- 1087 – Pope Victor III (born 1026)
- 1100 – Bernold of Constance, German priest and historian (born 1054)
- 1122 – Vitalis of Savigny, Catholic French saint and itinerant preacher (born 1060)
- 1226 – Pandulf Verraccio, Roman ecclesiastical politician
- 1343 – Philip III of Navarre (born 1306)
- 1345 – John IV, Duke of Brittany (born 1295)
- 1360 – William de Bohun, 1st Earl of Northampton (born 1319)
- 1380 – Charles V of France (born 1338)
- 1394 – Antipope Clement VII (born 1342)
- 1406 – Cyprian, Metropolitan of Moscow (born 1336)
- 1498 – Tomás de Torquemada, Spanish friar (born 1420)
- 1581 – Peter Niers, notorious German bandit (date of birth unknown)
- 1583 – Catherine Jagiellon, queen of John III of Sweden (born 1526)
- 1589 – Michael Baius, Belgian theologian and academic (born 1513)

=== 1601–1900 ===
- 1607 – Mary Stuart, English-Scottish princess (born 1605)
- 1672 – Anne Bradstreet, English poet (born 1612)
- 1701 – James II of England (born 1633)
- 1736 – Daniel Gabriel Fahrenheit, Polish-Dutch physicist and engineer, invented the thermometer (born 1686)
- 1792 – Nguyễn Huệ, Vietnamese emperor (born 1753)
- 1803 – Nicolas Baudin, French explorer, hydrographer, and cartographer (born 1754)
- 1819 – John Jeffries, American physician and surgeon (born 1744)
- 1824 – Louis XVIII of France (born 1755)
- 1843 – Ezekiel Hart, Canadian businessman and politician (born 1770)
- 1845 – Thomas Davis, Irish poet and publisher (born 1814)
- 1865 – Christian de Meza, Danish general (born 1792)
- 1887 – Sakaigawa Namiemon, Japanese sumo wrestler, the 14th Yokozuna (born 1841)
- 1896 – Antônio Carlos Gomes, Brazilian composer (born 1836)
- 1896 – Pavlos Kalligas, Greek jurist and politician, Foreign Minister of Greece (born 1814)
- 1898 – Ramón Emeterio Betances, Puerto Rican surgeon and politician (born 1827)

=== 1901–present ===
- 1911 – Edward Whymper, English-French mountaineer, explorer, and author (born 1840)
- 1914 – C. X. Larrabee, American businessman (born 1843)
- 1919 – Maria Nikiforova, Ukrainian anarchist partisan leader (born 1885)
- 1925 – Leo Fall, Czech-Austrian composer (born 1873)
- 1925 – Alexander Friedmann, Russian physicist and mathematician (born 1888)
- 1931 – Omar Mukhtar, Libyan theorist and educator (born 1862)
- 1932 – Millicent Lilian "Peg" Entwistle, British stage and screen actress (born 1908)
- 1932 – Ronald Ross, Indian-English physician and mathematician, Nobel Prize laureate (born 1857)
- 1933 – George Gore, American baseball player and manager (born 1857)
- 1936 – Jean-Baptiste Charcot, French physician and explorer (born 1867)
- 1940 – Charles Cochrane-Baillie, 2nd Baron Lamington, English-Scottish politician, 8th Governor of Queensland (born 1860)
- 1944 – Gustav Bauer, German journalist and politician, 11th Chancellor of Germany (born 1870)
- 1945 – John McCormack, Irish tenor and actor (born 1884)
- 1946 – James Hopwood Jeans, English physicist, astronomer, and mathematician (born 1877)
- 1950 – Pedro de Cordoba, American actor (born 1881)
- 1955 – Leo Amery, Indian-English journalist and politician, Secretary of State for the Colonies (born 1873)
- 1961 – Hasan Polatkan, Turkish politician, 15th Turkish Minister of Finance (born 1915)
- 1961 – Fatin Rüştü Zorlu, Turkish diplomat and politician, 21st Deputy Prime Minister of Turkey (born 1910)
- 1965 – Ahn Eak-tai, North Korean composer and conductor (born 1906)
- 1965 – Fred Quimby, American animator and producer (born 1886)
- 1973 – Víctor Jara, Chilean singer-songwriter, teacher and theatre director (born 1932)
- 1976 – Bertha Lutz, Brazilian feminist and scientist (born 1894)
- 1977 – Marc Bolan, English singer-songwriter and guitarist (born 1947)
- 1977 – Maria Callas, Greek operatic soprano (born 1923)
- 1980 – Jean Piaget, Swiss psychologist and philosopher (born 1896)
- 1984 – Louis Réard, French engineer and fashion designer, created the bikini (born 1897)
- 1984 – Richard Brautigan, American novelist, poet, and short story writer (born 1935)
- 1987 – Christopher Soames, English soldier and politician, Governor of Southern Rhodesia (born 1920)
- 1991 – Olga Spessivtseva, Russian-American ballerina (born 1895)
- 1992 – Millicent Fenwick, American journalist and politician (born 1910)
- 1993 – František Jílek, Czech conductor (born 1913)
- 1993 – Oodgeroo Noonuccal, Australian poet and activist (born 1920)
- 1996 – McGeorge Bundy, American intelligence officer and diplomat, 6th United States National Security Advisor (born 1919)
- 1996 – Gene Nelson, American actor, dancer, and director (born 1920)
- 2001 – Samuel Z. Arkoff, American producer (born 1918)
- 2002 – James Gregory, American actor (born 1911)
- 2003 – Sheb Wooley, American singer-songwriter (born 1921)
- 2004 – Michael Donaghy, American-English poet and author (born 1954)
- 2005 – Harry Freedman, Canadian horn player, composer, and educator (born 1922)
- 2005 – Gordon Gould, American physicist and academic, invented the laser (born 1920)
- 2006 – Floyd Curry, Canadian ice hockey player and coach (born 1925)
- 2006 – Zsuzsa Körmöczy, Hungarian tennis player and coach (born 1924)
- 2007 – Robert Jordan, American engineer and author (born 1948)
- 2008 – Norman Whitfield, American songwriter and producer (born 1940)
- 2009 – Myles Brand, American philosopher and academic (born 1942)
- 2009 – Ernst Märzendorfer, Austrian conductor (born 1921)
- 2009 – Mary Travers, American singer-songwriter (born 1936)
- 2010 – George N. Parks, American educator and bandleader (born 1953)
- 2010 – Jim Towers, English footballer (born 1933)
- 2011 – Willie "Big Eyes" Smith, American singer-songwriter, harmonica player, and drummer (born 1936)
- 2011 – Enamul Haque Chowdhury, Bangladeshi politician (born 1948)
- 2012 – Roman Kroitor, Canadian director and producer, co-founded IMAX (born 1926)
- 2012 – Julien J. LeBourgeois, American admiral (born 1923)
- 2012 – Friedrich Zimmermann, German lawyer and politician, German Federal Minister of the Interior (born 1925)
- 2013 – Scott Adams, American football player (born 1966)
- 2013 – Ratiba El-Hefny, Egyptian soprano and director (born 1931)
- 2013 – Patsy Swayze, American dancer and choreographer (born 1927)
- 2015 – Guy Béart, Egyptian-French singer-songwriter (born 1930)
- 2015 – Julio Brady, Virgin Islander lawyer, judge, and politician, 5th Lieutenant Governor of the United States Virgin Islands (born 1942)
- 2015 – Kurt Oppelt, Austrian figure skater and coach (born 1932)
- 2015 – Allan Wright, English captain and pilot (born 1920)
- 2016 – Tarık Akan, Turkish actor, director and activist (born 1949)
- 2016 – Edward Albee, American director and playwright (born 1928)
- 2016 – Gabriele Amorth, Italian priest and exorcist (born 1925)
- 2016 – Carlo Azeglio Ciampi, Italian economist and politician, 10th President of Italy and 49th Prime Minister of Italy (born 1920)
- 2016 – W. P. Kinsella, Canadian novelist (born 1935)
- 2016 – Gérard Louis-Dreyfus, French-born American businessman (born 1932)
- 2016 – António Mascarenhas Monteiro, Cabo Verdean politician, 2nd President of Cape Verde (born 1944)
- 2017 – Marcelo Rezende, Brazilian journalist (born 1951)
- 2017 – Arjan Singh, Marshal of the Indian Air Force (born 1919)
- 2018 – James Burdette Thayer, American brigadier general (born 1920)
- 2019 – H. S. Dillon, Indonesian politician and human rights defender (born 1945)
- 2020 – Maxim Martsinkevich, Russian social activist and media personality (born 1984)
- 2021 – Jane Powell, American actress (born 1929)
- 2021 – Clive Sinclair, English entrepreneur and inventor (born 1940)
- 2024 – Song Binbin, Chinese revolutionary (born 1947)
- 2025 – Robert Redford, American actor, producer and director (born 1936)
- 2026 – Randy Pedersen, American bowler and sportscaster (born 1962)

== Holidays and observances ==
- Christian feast day:
  - Andrew Kim Taegon
  - Curcodomus
  - Cornelius and Cyprian (Catholic Church)
  - Edith of Wilton
  - Euphemia
  - John Macias
  - Ludmila
  - Ninian
  - Pope Cornelius
  - Vitalis of Savigny
  - September 16 (Eastern Orthodox liturgics).
- Cry of Dolores, celebrates the declaration of independence of Mexico from Spain in 1810. See Fiestas Patrias
- Independence Day (Papua New Guinea), celebrates the independence of Papua New Guinea from Australia in 1975.
- International Day for the Preservation of the Ozone Layer
- Malaysian Armed Forces Day (Malaysia)
- Malaysia Day (Malaysia)
- Martyrs' Day (Libya)
- National Heroes Day (Saint Kitts and Nevis)
