= Gustav Bergmann =

Austrian-born American philosopher (1906–1987)

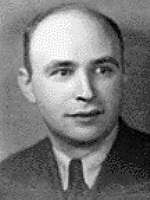
- Born: 4 May 1906; Vienna, Austria-Hungary
- Died: 21 April 1987 (aged 80); Iowa City, Iowa, U.S.

Education
- Education: University of Vienna
- Doctoral advisor: Walther Mayer

Philosophical work
- Era: 20th-century philosophy
- Region: Western philosophy
- School: Analytic philosophy Vienna Circle; Logical positivism (1950s); Metaphysical realism (1960s)
- Institutions: University of Iowa
- Main interests: Philosophy of science, metaphysics
- Notable ideas: Coining the term "linguistic turn"

Gustav Bergmann (Austrian German: [ˈbɛrɡman]; May 4, 1906 – April 21, 1987) was an Austrian-American philosopher. He studied at the University of Vienna and was a member of the Vienna Circle. Bergmann was influenced by the philosophers Moritz Schlick, Friedrich Waismann, and Rudolf Carnap, who were members of the Circle. In the United States, he was a professor of philosophy and psychology at the University of Iowa.

== Biography ==
Bergmann was born in Vienna. He earned his Ph.D. in mathematics at the University of Vienna in 1928. His dissertation, directed by Walther Mayer, was titled Zwei Beiträge zur mehrdimensionalen Differentialgeometrie. While studying for his doctorate, he was invited to join the Vienna Circle, a group of philosophers, mathematicians, scientists, and others committed to a scientific worldview under the name of logical positivism. In 1930–31, he worked with Albert Einstein in Berlin. Unable as a Jew to find academic employment, Bergmann obtained a J.D. degree from the University of Vienna in 1935, and practiced corporate law until he and his family fled to the United States in 1938. Settling at the University of Iowa in Iowa City in 1939, Bergmann eventually became professor of both philosophy and psychology.

He died in Iowa City.

== Bibliography ==
- The Metaphysics of Logical Positivism. New York: Longmans, Green & Co. 1954. (Second edition: Madison, University of Wisconsin Press, 1967.)
- Philosophy of Science. Madison: University of Wisconsin Press 1957.
- Meaning and Existence. Madison: University of Wisconsin Press 1959.
- Logic and Reality. Madison: University of Wisconsin Press 1964.
- Realism: A Critique of Brentano and Meinong. Madison: University of Wisconsin Press 1967.
- New Foundations of Ontology. Madison: University of Wisconsin Press 1992. Edited by William Heald.
- Collected Works. Vol I. II. Frankfurt am Main: Ontos Verlag 2003.

== See also ==
- American philosophy
