= Pålsson =

Pålsson is a Swedish-language surname. Notable people with the surname include:

- Adam Pålsson, (born 1988), Swedish actor and musician
- Anders Pålsson (born 1948), Swedish businessman
- Anne-Marie Pålsson, Swedish politician
- Chatrine Pålsson Ahlgren, Swedish politician
- Eric Pålsson Mullica, early Swedish settler (with Finnish ancestry) to New Sweden
- Göran Printz-Påhlson (1931–2006), Swedish poet, literary critic, translator
- Hans Pålsson, Swedish pianist and professor
- Jöns Pålsson (1870–1951), Swedish farmer and politician, MP
- Lars Pålsson Syll Swedish economist and professor
- Lennart Pålsson (1933–2010) Swedish lawyer and professor
- Magnus "SoulEye" Pålsson, composer of PPPPPP, the soundtrack for VVVVVV
- Margareta Pålsson (born 1949), Swedish politician
- Per Pålsson (1828–1914), Swedish murderer
- Sten Pålsson Swedish footballer

== Fictional characters ==
- Morgan Pålsson, a fictional reported from Swedish comedies Morgan Pålsson – världsreporter and Hipphipp!
