= Rose Rand =

American philosopher

- Rose Rand, 8 February 1949
- Born: Rozalia Rand; 14 June 1903; Lemberg, Galicia, Austria Hungary
- Died: 28 July 1980 (aged 77); Princeton, New Jersey, U.S.

Education
- Education: University of Vienna
- Doctoral advisor: Robert Reininger; Moritz Schlick
- Other advisor: Rudolf Carnap

Philosophical work
- Era: Contemporary philosophy
- Region: Western philosophy
- School: Analytic philosophy Logical positivism Vienna Circle
- Institutions: University of Vienna
- Main interests: Logic, epistemology, philosophy of science
- Notable ideas: Analysis of notions

Rose Rand (born Rozalia Rand, Austrian German: [rand]; June 14, 1903 – July 28, 1980) was an Austrian-American logician and philosopher. She was a member of the Vienna Circle.

== Life and work ==
Rose (Rozalia) Rand was born in Lemberg in the Austrian crown land of Galicia (today, Lviv, Ukraine). After her family had moved to Austria she studied at the Polish Gymnasium in Vienna. In 1924 she enrolled in Vienna University, her teachers included Heinrich Gomperz, Moritz Schlick, and Rudolf Carnap. She graduated with her first degree in 1928. During her post-graduation years, she remained in contact with Vienna Circle colleagues such as Schlick.

As a PhD candidate, Rand participated regularly in the Vienna Circle discussions, and kept records of these discussions, she was most active in the Vienna Circle from 1930 to 1935. Between 1930 and 1937 she worked, and took part in research, at the Psychiatric-neurological Clinic of Vienna University. She also earned money by tutoring students, giving adult education classes, and translating Polish articles on logic.

In 1937 her doctoral thesis on Tadeusz Kotarbiński's philosophy was approved and she completed her PhD viva. In 1938, on the same day she completed her final doctoral exam, she was awarded her PhD. As a Jew, however, she was barred from her profession.

Rose Rand, unemployed and of Jewish descent, suffered great difficulties in pre-World War II Vienna. In 1939, with the assistance of Susan Stebbing, she finally emigrated to London as a Jew without nationality.

After a period of time in England in which she worked as a nurse she was admitted as "distinguished foreigner" at the faculty of Moral Science at Cambridge University. There she attended the seminars of Ludwig Wittgenstein. In 1943 she lost her privileges and had to work at a metal factory, and teach night classes in German and psychology in the Luton Technical College and Tottenham Technical College. Between 1943 and 1950 she also worked in practical engineering. Karl Popper helped her to get a small research grant, so she could attend Oxford University as a "recognized student" from 1950 to 1954.

Rand moved to the United States in 1954. There she sought academic employment and initially attempted to pursue her research at the libraries of Princeton and Harvard universities. Between 1955 and 1959 she held temporary positions teaching elementary math, ancient philosophy and logic, and was a research associate, in the University of Chicago, Indiana University Northwest in Gary, and Notre Dame University.

In 1959 she returned to Cambridge, Massachusetts and after that to Princeton, New Jersey. In the following years she earned her living from grants and fellowships which were given to her mostly for her work on translations of Polish and Russian logicians. When not supported by grants Rand operated on private loans and other financial assistance, freelance translation work, or sporadic temporary employment.

Rose Rand died on 28 July 1980 in Princeton, aged 77.

Rand's records at the University of Pittsburgh contain, among other things, her research, the records of the discussions in the Vienna Circle and over 1,600 letters to Otto Neurath, Ludwig Wittgenstein, Alfred Tarski and others. Some of her correspondence (from her time as an émigré in England) is also held by Oxford University's Bodleian Library.

== Sources ==
- Stadler, Friedrich. Translators: C. Nielsen, J. Golb, S. Schmidt and T. Ernst. 2001. The Vienna Circle: Studies in the Origins, Development, and Influence of Logical Empiricism. Springer. ISBN 3-211-83243-2, ISBN 978-3-211-83243-1.
- Hamacher-Hermes, Adelheid. 2003. "Rose Rand: a Woman in Logic". In Stadler, Friedrich, (ed.) The Vienna Circle and Logical Empiricism: Re-Evaluation and Future Perspectives. Springer. ISBN 0-306-48214-2
- Iven, Mathias. 2004. Rand und Wittgenstein. Versuch einer Annäherung. Peter Lang. ISBN 978-3-631-52394-0
