= Josef Schächter =

Austrian rabbi (1901–1994)

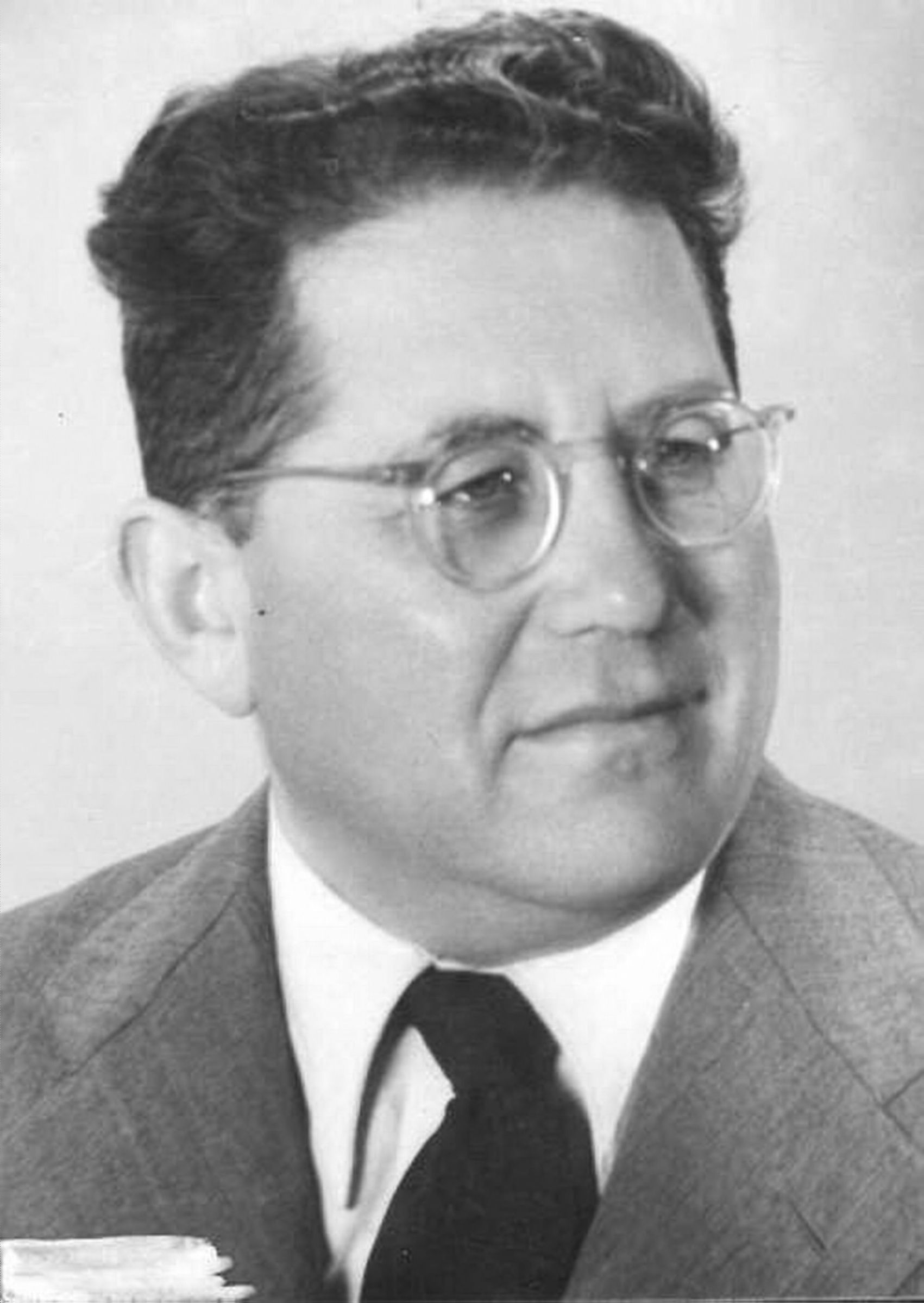
Schächter in 1952

Josef Schächter (September 16, 1901, in Kundrynce, Galicia – March 27, 1994, in Haifa) was an Austrian rabbi, philosopher and member of the Vienna Circle from 1925 to 1936.

== Life ==
Schächter was the son of Shoel Schächter and Sarah, née Distenfield. He trained as a rabbi and was ordained in 1926. He worked as a Talmud teacher from 1922 to 1929 at the Hebraic school in Vienna and from 1935 to 1938 at the Bible Rambam Institute.

At the same time, he studied philosophy, primarily with Moritz Schlick and completed his studies in 1931 with a dissertation under Schlick with the title “Critical Account of N. Hartmann’s ‘Grundzüge einer Metaphysik der Erkenntnis’” („Kritische Darstellung von N. Hartmanns‚ Grundzüge einer Metaphysik der Erkenntnis‘“).

From 1925 to 1936 Schächter attended the meetings of the Vienna Circle. His work Prolegomena zu einer kritischen Grammatik (Prolegomena to a Critical Grammar) was published with a preface by Schlick in the Circle’s book series Schriften zur wissenschaftlichen Weltauffassung (Monographs on the Scientific World-Conception) in 1935. This work was influenced by Schlick, Friedrich Waismann, and Ludwig Wittgenstein. After Schlick’s murder, Schächter intermittently substituted Friedrich Waismann in running philosophical seminars.

In 1938 Schächter emigrated to Palestine. He taught at secondary schools, first in Tel Aviv until 1940 and then in Haifa until 1950. In 1943 he married the teacher Netti Dlugacz. From 1951 to 1952 he was superintendent of schools in the Israeli school system. Later he worked as a lecturer for Bible and Aggadah at the teacher’s seminar in Haifa.

At the beginning of the 1950s a group of his students founded the Kibbuz "Yodefat" in Galilee in order to put Schächter’s ideas into practice.

Schächter published numerous works on classical Judaism, on language, meaning, and belief in the context of science and religion.

== Selected works ==
- "Kritische Darstellung von N. Hartmanns 'Grundzüge einer Metaphysik der Erkenntnis'", Diss., Vienna 1931.
- Prolegomena zu einer kritischen Grammatik (= Schriften zur wissenschaftlichen Weltauffassung, 10), Vienna 1935. – Reedited as Prolegomena to a Critical Grammar, Preface by J. F. Staal. Reidel, Dordrecht-Boston 1973.
- Mavo Kazar L'Logistikah (A brief outline of logistics [hebr.], with a preface by Hugo Bermann, Vienna 1937.
- "Der Sinn pessimistischer Sätze", in: Synthese 3, 1938, 223-233.
- "Über das Verstehen", in: Synthese 8, 1950/51, 367-384.
- "The Task of the Modern Intellectual", in: An Anthology of Hebrew Essays II, 1966, 299-310.
- (Together with Heinrich Melzer), „Über den Physikalismus“, in: B. McGuinness (Hrsg.), Zurück zu Schlick. Eine Neubewertung von Werk und Wirkung, Hölder-Pichler-Tempsky, Wien 1985, 92-103.

== Bibliography ==
- Stadler, Friedrich. The Vienna Circle. Studies in the Origins, Development, and Influence of Logical Empiricism. New York: Springer, 2001. – 2nd Edition: Dordrecht: Springer, 2015. – Biobibliographical presentation of Schächter: 720-721.
- Moritz Schlick: „Geleitwort“ [in: Josef Schächter, Prolegomena zu einer kritischen Grammatik], in: Moritz Schlick Gesamtausgabe, Abteilung I, Band 6, Die Wiener Zeit, ed. by Johannes Friedl, Heiner Rutte, 635-642. (German)
- Friedrich Waismann, Josef Schächter und Moritz Schlick: Ethics and the Will. Essays, ed. and with an introduction by Brian McGuinness and Joachim Schulte, Kluwer, Dordrecht-Boston-London 1994.
- J. S. Diamond: "Josef Schächter: An Approach to ›Jewish Consciousness‹," in: Reconstructionist, Annual Israel Issue 30, 1964, S. 17-24.
- Volker Thurm (ed.): Wien und der Wiener Kreis: Orte einer unvollendeten Moderne; ein Begleitbuch, in collaboration with Elisabeth Nemeth, Schriftenreihe Wissenschaftliche Weltauffassung und Kunst; Sonderbd., WUV, Vienna 2003, ISBN 3-85114-777-4, 348 f. (German)
- Heinrich-Ramharter, Esther; Stadler, Friedrich, eds. (2024–2025). Josef Schächter : philosophical writings and documents in the context of the Vienna Circle. Cham, Switzerland: Springer Nature Switzerland. ISBN 9783031701689.
