= Institute Vienna Circle / Vienna Circle Society =

International nonprofit organization

- Formation: October 1991
- Founder: Friedrich Stadler
- Location: Vienna, Austria

The Institute Vienna Circle (IVC) ("Society for the Advancement of the Scientific World Conception") was founded in October 1991 as an international nonprofit organization dedicated to the work and influence of the Vienna Circle of Logical Empiricism. Since 2011 the IVC was established as a subunit (Department) of the Faculty of Philosophy and Education at the University of Vienna. In 2016 the title of the co-existing society was changed to "Vienna Circle Society" (VCS), which entertains a close co-operation with the IVC. The Institute’s founder and scientific director of the VCS is Friedrich Stadler, who serves as a permanent fellow of the IVC in parallel.

== Objectives ==
Its goal is the documentation and continued development of the Vienna Circle's work in science and public education, areas that have been neglected until now, as well as the maintenance and application of logical-empirical, critical-rational and linguistic analytical thought and construction of a scientific philosophy and world view in conjunction with general socio-cultural trends. One of the Institute's main objectives is to democratize knowledge and science as a process of enlightenment, counteracting all forms of irrational, dogmatic or fundamentalist thought, in a societal context and taking into account the latest developments in international research.

== Activities ==
- The organisation of a large number of international workshops, conferences and seminars on the Vienna Circle, the philosophy of science and related topics.
- Publication of a number of books within book series in German and English: Vienna Circle Institute Yearbook, the book series Vienna Circle Institute Library, the book series Wissenschaftliche Weltauffassung und Kunst, the book series Veröffentlichungen des Instituts Wiener Kreis.
- Research projects: Moritz Schlick edition project in cooperation with the University of Rostock, Ernst Mach edition project. Numerous completed and ongoing research projects.
- The IVC/VCS is involved in the doctoral programme The Sciences in Historical, Philosophical, and Cultural Contexts and the master study programme History and Philosophy of Science.
- Since 2001 the IVC/VCS organises the annual Vienna International Summer University – Scientific World Conceptions / University of Vienna Summer School (USS-SWC).
- In 2015 the IVC/VCS organised the first exhibition on the Vienna Circle at the University of Vienna.

== Library ==
The IVC hosts a research library used by researchers. It includes the Otto Neurath's Exile Library, the Robert S. Cohen Collection and Archives, the Kurt Blaukopf Library, the Kurt R. Fischer Library, the Eugene T. Gadol Library, the Arthur Pap Library together with his scientific archive, and the huge philosophy of science library of Paul Weingartner.
