= Olga Hahn-Neurath =

Austrian mathematician and philosopher

Portrait of Hahn-Neurath

Olga Hahn-Neurath (German: [haːn ˈnɔʏʀaːt]; 20 July 1882 – 20 July 1937) was an Austrian mathematician and philosopher. She is best known for being a member of the Vienna Circle. She was sister of the mathematician Hans Hahn.

== Biography ==
Born in Vienna, Hahn enrolled as a student for math and philosophy studies at the University of Vienna in 1902. She became blind in 1904, when she was 22. In 1911, she became the third ever female graduate in philosophy at Vienna University. Her doctoral thesis, published in 1911, received great compliments from her instructor, Adolf Stöhr, the successor to the chair of Ludwig Boltzmann. Her main interest in math was in the field of Boolean algebra.

In 1912 she married Otto Neurath whom she met during her studies. Olga became a regular participant in the Vienna Circle discussions. Following the defeat of Red Vienna in the Austrian Civil War (February 1934), she fled, through Poland and Denmark to the Netherlands, where she joined her husband. She died on her birthday three years later in The Hague, of a lung infection following an operation.
