= Nomological danglers =

"Nomological danglers" is a term used by Scottish-Australian philosopher J. J. C. Smart in his article "Sensations and Brain Processes". Smart credits the term to Herbert Feigl and his article "The 'Mental' and the 'Physical'." A nomological dangler refers to the occurrence of something (in this case a sensation) that does not fit into the system of established laws. Smart believes that it is absurd that everything can be explained by the laws of physics except consciousness. He identifies consciousness with the broad term "sensations". In his example the nomological danglers would be sensations such that are not able to be explained by the scientific theory of brain processes. Some mental entities for example in a phenomenological field, are not able to be found (and do not behave in the way that is expected) in physics. In the context Smart uses it, he is criticising dualism and epiphenomenalism as philosophies of mind, and the concerns over physical and causal laws they raise. Smart puts forward his own theory in the form of materialism, claiming it is a better theory, in part because it is free from these nomological danglers, making it superior in accordance with Occam's razor. To add something that operated according to a different "law" would effectively be to a new thing that is a law unto itself.
