= List of Austrian intellectual traditions =

This is an incomplete list of topics relating to the intellectual traditions of Austria.

- Austrian culture
- Austromarxism
- German philosophy
- Austrian School of Economics
- Vienna Circle
- Vienna School of Art History

== People ==
- List of German-language philosophers
- Alexius Meinong
- Carl Gustav Jung
- Sigmund Freud
- Ludwig Wittgenstein
- Ludwig von Mises

== Periods ==
- Sturm und Drang
- German Romanticism
