= Oskar Becker =

German philosopher (1889–1964)

Oskar Becker

Oskar Becker (5 September 1889 – 13 November 1964) was a German philosopher, logician, mathematician, and historian of mathematics.

== Early life ==
Becker was born in Leipzig, where he studied mathematics. His dissertation under Otto Hölder and Karl Rohn (1914) was On the Decomposition of Polygons in non-intersecting triangles on the Basis of the Axioms of Connection and Order.

He served in World War I and returned to study philosophy with Edmund Husserl, writing his Habilitationsschrift on Investigations of the Phenomenological Foundations of Geometry and their Physical Applications, (1923). Becker was Husserl's assistant, informally, and then official editor of the Yearbook for Phenomenological Research.

== Work in phenomenology and mathematical philosophy ==
Becker published his major work, Mathematical Existence in the Yearbook in 1927, the same year Martin Heidegger's Being and Time appeared there. Becker attended Heidegger's seminars at this period.

Becker utilized not only Husserlian phenomenology but, much more controversially, Heideggerian hermeneutics, discussing arithmetical counting as "being toward death". His work was criticized both by neo-Kantians and by more mainstream, rationalist logicians, to whom Becker feistily replied. This work has not had great influence on later debates in the foundations of mathematics, despite its many interesting analyses of the topic of its title.

Becker debated with David Hilbert and Paul Bernays over the role of the potential infinite in Hilbert's formalist metamathematics. Becker argued that Hilbert could not stick with finitism, but had to assume the potential infinite. Clearly enough, Hilbert and Bernays do implicitly accept the potential infinite, but they claim that each induction in their proofs is finite. Becker was correct that complete induction was needed for assertions of consistency in the form of universally quantified sentences, as opposed to claiming that a predicate holds for each individual natural number.

=== Paraontologie ===
In discussing Heidegger, Becker introduced the German neologism Paraontologie. Although fundamentally different this usage has provided some minor influences in the term "paraontology" in English made more recently by Nahum Chandler, Fred Moten, and others, in discussing blackness.

== Intuitionistic and modal logic ==
Becker made a start toward the formalization of L. E. J. Brouwer's intuitionistic logic. He developed a semantics of intuitionistic logic based on Husserl's phenomenology, and this semantics was used by Arend Heyting in his own formalization. Becker struggled, somewhat unsuccessfully, with the formulation of the rejection of excluded middle appropriate for intuitionistic logic. Becker failed in the end to correctly distinguish classical and intuitionistic negation, but he made a start. In an appendix to his book on mathematical existence, Becker set the problem of finding a formal calculus for intuitionistic logic. In a series of works in the early 1950s he surveyed modal, intuitionistic, probabilistic, and other philosophical logics.

Becker made contributions to modal logic (the logic of necessity and possibility) and Becker's postulate, the claim that modal status is necessary (for instance that the possibility of P implies the necessity of the possibility of P, and also the iteration of necessity) is named for him. Becker's Postulate later played a role in the formalization given, by Charles Hartshorne, the American process theologian, of the Ontological Proof of God's existence, stimulated by conversations with the logical positivist and opponent of the alleged proof, Rudolf Carnap.

== History of mathematics ==
Becker also made important contributions to the history and interpretation of ancient Greek mathematics. Becker, as did several others, emphasized the "crisis" in Greek mathematics occasioned by the discovery of incommensurability of the side of the pentagon (or in the later, simpler proofs, the triangle) by Hippasus of Metapontum, and the threat of (literally) "irrational" numbers. To German theorists of the "crisis", the Pythagorean diagonal of the square was similar in its impact to Cantor's diagonalization method of generating higher order infinities, and Gödel's diagonalization method in Gödel's proof of incompleteness of formalized arithmetic. Becker, like several earlier historians, suggests that the avoidance of arithmetic statement of geometrical magnitude in Euclid is avoided for ratios and proportions, as a consequence of recoil from the shock of incommensurability. Becker also showed that all the theorems of Euclidean proportion theory could be proved using an earlier alternative to the Eudoxus technique which Becker found stated in Aristotle's Topics, and which Becker attributes to Theaetetus. Becker also showed how a constructive logic that denied unrestricted excluded middle could be used to reconstruct most of Euclid's proofs.

More recent revisionist commentators such as Wilbur Knorr and David Fowler have accused historians of early Greek mathematics writing in the early twentieth century, such as Becker, of reading the crisis of their own times illegitimately into the early Greek period. (This “crisis” may include both the crisis of twentieth century set theory and foundations of mathematics, and the general crisis of World War I, the overthrow of the Kaiser, communist uprisings, and the Weimar Republic.)

== Later thought ==
At the end of his life Becker re-emphasized the distinction between intuition of the formal and Platonic realm as opposed to the concrete existential realm, moved to the terminology, at least, of divination. In his Dasein und Dawesen Becker advocated what he called a "mantic" divination. Hermeneutics of the Heideggerian sort is applicable to individual lived existence, but "mantic" decipherment is necessary not only in mathematics, but in aesthetics, and the investigation of the unconscious. These realms deal with the eternal and structural, such as the symmetries of nature, and are properly investigated by a mantic phenomenology, not an hermeneutic one. (Becker's emphasis on the timelessness and formal nature of the unconscious has some parallels with the account of Jacques Lacan.)

== Contacts and correspondence ==
Becker carried on an extensive correspondence with some of the greatest mathematicians and philosophers of the day. These included Ackermann, Adolf Fraenkel (later Abraham), Arend Heyting, David Hilbert, John von Neumann, Hermann Weyl, and Ernst Zermelo among mathematicians, as well as Hans Reichenbach and Felix Kaufmann among philosophers. The letters that Becker received from these major figures of twentieth century mathematics and leading logical positivist philosophers, as well as Becker's own copies of his letters to them, were destroyed during World War II.

Becker's correspondence with Weyl has been reconstructed (see bibliography), as Weyl's copies of Becker's letters to him are preserved, and Becker often extensively quotes or paraphrases Weyl's own letters. Perhaps the same can be done with some other parts of this valuable but lost correspondence. Weyl entered into correspondence with Becker with high hopes and expectations, given their mutual admiration for Husserl's phenomenology and Husserl's great admiration for the work of Becker. However, Weyl, whose sympathies were with constructivism and intuitionism, lost patience when he argued with Becker about a purported intuition of the infinite defended by Becker. Weyl concluded, sourly, that Becker would discredit phenomenological approaches to mathematics if he persisted in this position.

== Nazism and neglect ==
It is possible that regard for Becker's earlier work suffered from his later Nazi allegiances, leading to lack of reference or published commentary by émigré logicians and mathematicians who had fled Hitlerism. His lecture on "The Vacuity of Art and the Daring of the Artist," presents a "Nordic Metaphysics" in fairly standard Nazi style.

According to Oskar Becker, the "rhythm of Nietzsche's Dionysian-Dithyrambs was identical to the Will to power and physically in the sense of youth identical to the marching rhythm of the SA".

Oskar Becker was classified from an SS-point of view in the following way in the "SD-Dossiers über Philosophie-Professoren" (i.e. SD-files concerning philosophy professors) that were set up by the SS Security Service (SD): "not a party member but loyal to National Socialism, tries to consolidate the National Socialistic ideology".

Two able philosophers who were students of Becker, Jürgen Habermas and Hans Sluga, later grappled with the issue of the influence of Nazism on German academia. The application of Heidegger's ideas to theoretical science (let alone mathematics) has only recently become widespread, particularly in the English-speaking world. Furthermore, Becker's polemical replies probably alienated his critics still further.

He died, aged 75, in Bonn.

== Bibliography ==
- Über die Zerlegung eines Polygons in exclusive Dreiecke auf Grund der ebenen Axiome der Verknuepfung und Anordnung (Leipzig, 1914)
- "Contributions Toward a Phenomenological Foundation of Geometry and Its Physical Applications," from Beiträge zur phänomenologischen Begründung der Geometrie und ihre physikalischen Anwendungen (Jahrbuch für Philosophie und phänomenologische Forschung IV 1923, 493–560). Selections trans. by Theodore Kisiel, in Phenomenology and the Natural Sciences, ed. Joseph Kockelmans and Theordore J. Kisiel, Evanston IL: Northwestern University Press, 1970, 119–143.
- Mathematische Existenz. Untersuchungen zur Logik und Ontologie mathematischer Phänomene (Jahrbuch für Philosophie und phänomenologische Forschung, Vol. VIII, 1927, 440–809.
- "The Philosophy of Edmund Husserl," transl. R. O. Elverton, in The Phenomenology of Husserl, ed. R. O. Elverton, Quadrangle Books, Chicago: 1970, 40–72, originally "Die Philosophie Edmund Husserls. Anlässlich seines 70. Geburtstags dargestellt" in Kantstudien vol. 35, 1930, 119–150.
- “Eudoxus-Studien: I: Eine voreudoxische Proportionenlehre und ihre Spuren bei Aristoteles und Euklid,” Quellen und Studien zur Geschichte der Mathematik, Astronomie und Physik B. II (1933), 311–330. [reprinted in Jean Christianidis, ed. Classics in the history of Greek Mathematics, Boston Studies in the Philosophie of Science, vol. 240, Dordrecht/Boston: 2004, 191–209, with intro. by Ken Saito, 188–9.] “II: Warum haben die Griechen die Existenz der vierten Proportionale angenommen,” 369–387, “III: Spuren eines Stetigkeitsaxioms in der Art des Dedekindschen zur Zeir des Eudoxos,” vol. 3 (1936) 236–244, “IV: Das Prinzip des ausgeschlossenen Dritten in der griechischen Mathematik,” 370–388, “V: Die eudoxische Lehre von den Ideen und den Farben, 3 (1936) 389–410.
- "Zur Logik der Modalitäten", in: Jahrbuch für Philosophie und phänomenologische Forschung, Bd. XI (1930), pp. 497–548
- Grundlagen der Mathematik in geschichtlicher Entwicklung, Freiburg/München: Alber, 1954 (2. Aufl. 1964; diese Aufl. ist auch text- und seitenidentisch erschienen als Suhrkamp Taschenbuch Wissenschaft 114. Frankfurt a. M. : Suhrkamp, 1975)
- Dasein und Dawesen (1964)
- Letters to Hermann Weyl, in Paolo Mancosu and T. A. Ryckman, “Mathematics and Phenomenology: The Correspondence between O. Becker and H. Weyl,” Philosophia Mathematica, 3d Series, vol. 10 (2002) 174–194.
