= Felix Kaufmann =

Austrian-American philosopher of law

Portrait of Kaufmann

Felix Kaufmann (4 July 1895, Vienna – 23 December 1949, New York City) was an Austrian-American philosopher of law.

== Biography ==
Kaufmann studied jurisprudence and philosophy in Vienna. He became part of the legal-philosophical school of Hans Kelsen. From 1922 to 1938 he was a Privatdozent at the University of Vienna. During this time Kaufmann was associated with the Vienna Circle. He also wrote on the foundations of mathematics where, along with Hermann Weyl and Oskar Becker, he was attempting to apply the phenomenology of Edmund Husserl to constructive mathematics.

In 1938, the conditions for Jewish scholars became too hard and he left for the U.S. There he taught until his death as a law professor, in the Graduate Faculty of the New School for Social Research. Kaufmann also aided fellow Austrian emigres in need of assistance during the pre-war years when the situation became dire for Jewish academics and scholars in Germany and Austria. Interceding on Karl Popper's behalf, Popper was offered academic hospitality at Cambridge University and a stipend of £150 for one year - this offer was transferable, and Friedrich Waismann took it up when Popper went to New Zealand instead (see John Watkins in Proceedings of the British Academy, 94, 645–684, 652).

In 1936 he produced a book on the methodology of the social sciences (Kaufmann 1936). After moving to the United States he was invited to write a similar book in English, but what he produced (Kaufmann 1944) was significantly different, under the influence of Dewey's Logic: The Theory of Inquiry. The original book was translated over 70 years later (Cohen and Helling 2014).

== Works ==
- Logik und Rechtwissenschaft, 1922
- Die Kriterien des Rechts, 1924
- Das Unendliche in der Mathematik und seine Ausschaltung, 1930
- Methodenlehre der Sozialwissenschaften, 1936
- Methododology of the Social Sciences, New York: Oxford University Press 1941.
