= Herbert Feigl =

Austrian-American philosopher

- Feigl in 1973
- Born: 14 December 1902; Reichenberg (Liberec), Bohemia, Austria-Hungary
- Died: 1 June 1988 (aged 85); Minneapolis, Minnesota, U.S.

Education
- Education: LMU Munich; University of Vienna (PhD)
- Thesis: Chance and Law: An Epistemological Analysis of the Roles of Probability and Induction in the Natural Sciences (1927)
- Doctoral advisor: Moritz Schlick

Philosophical work
- Era: 20th-century philosophy
- Region: Western philosophy
- School: Analytic philosophy Vienna Circle
- Institutions: University of Iowa; University of Minnesota
- Notable students: Hugh Mellor
- Main interests: Philosophy of science
- Notable ideas: Nomological danglers

Herbert Feigl (/ˈfaɪɡəl/; German: [ˈfaɪgl̩]; December 14, 1902 – June 1, 1988) was an Austrian-American philosopher and an early member of the Vienna Circle. He coined the term "nomological danglers".

== Biography ==
The son of a trained weaver who became a textile designer, Feigl was born in Reichenberg (Liberec), Bohemia, into a Jewish (though not religious) family.

He studied mathematics, physics, and philosophy at LMU Munich from 1921 to 1922. He transferred to the University of Vienna in 1922 and studied physics and philosophy under Moritz Schlick, Hans Hahn, Hans Thirring, and Karl Bühler. He became one of the members of the Vienna Circle in 1924 and would be one of the few Circle members (along with Schlick and Friedrich Waismann) to have extensive conversations with Ludwig Wittgenstein and Karl Popper. Feigl received his doctorate at Vienna in 1927 for his dissertation Zufall und Gesetz: Versuch einer naturerkenntnistheoretischen Klarung des Wahrscheinlichkeits- und Induktionsproblems (Chance and Law: An Epistemological Analysis of the Roles of Probability and Induction in the Natural Sciences). He published his first book, Theorie und Erfahrung in der Physik (Theory and Experience in Physics), in 1929.

In 1930, on an International Rockefeller Foundation scholarship at Harvard University, Feigl met the physicist Percy Williams Bridgman, the philosopher Willard Van Orman Quine, and the psychologist Stanley Smith Stevens, all of whom he saw as kindred spirits. In 1931, with Albert Blumberg, he published the paper "Logical Positivism: A New European Movement" which argued for logical positivism to be renamed "logical empiricism" based upon certain realist differences between contemporary philosophy of science and the older positivist movement.

In 1930, Feigl married Maria Kaspar and emigrated with her to the United States, settling in Iowa to take up a position in the philosophy department at the University of Iowa. Their son, Eric Otto, was born in 1933. In 1940, Herbert Feigl accepted a position as professor of philosophy at the University of Minnesota, where he remained for 31 years. His close professional and personal relationship with Wilfrid Sellars produced many different collaborative projects, including the textbook Readings in Philosophical Analysis and the journal Philosophical Studies, which he and Sellars (with other colleagues) founded in 1949.

In 1953, he established the Minnesota Center for Philosophy of Science (the first center of its kind in the United States) with a grant from the Hill Foundation. He was appointed Regents Professor of the University of Minnesota in 1967.

Feigl believed that empiricism is the only adequate philosophy for experimental science. Though he became a philosopher instead of a chemist, he never lost the perspective and the scientific common sense of a practical scientist. He was one of the signers of the Humanist Manifesto and he was, in the paradigmatic sense, a philosopher of science.

Feigl wrote the introduction to the 1974 edition of Moritz Schlick's General Theory of Knowledge and wrote a memoir of Schlick for a published collection of Schlick's papers.

Feigl retired in 1971 and died of cancer on 1 June 1988 in Minneapolis. He was joined in death by his wife, Maria, the following year; they were survived by their son Eric O. Feigl, a professor of physiology at the University of Washington.

== Selected publications ==
- Herbert Feigl, "The "Mental" and the "Physical": The Essay and a Postscript" (1967)
