= Edgar Zilsel =

Austrian historian and philosopher

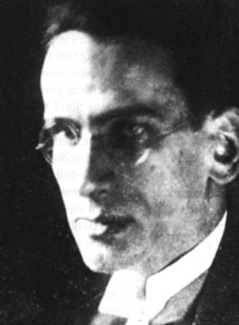
Edgar Zilsel

Edgar Zilsel (German: [ˈtsɪlzəl]; August 11, 1891, Vienna, Austria-Hungary – March 11, 1944, Oakland, California) was an Austrian-American historian and philosopher of science.

He is best known for the Zilsel Thesis, a scientific proposal which traces the origins of western science to the interactions between scholars and skilled artisans. The proposal melded practical experimentation with analytical thought. As part of the left wing of the Vienna Circle (a group of early twentieth-century philosophers) he endorsed historical materialism, and sought to establish empirical laws in history and in society.

Zilsel was Jewish, and followed a Marxist political view, both of which rendered him unable to pursue an academic career in Austria. Fleeing persecution, he escaped to the United States where he received a Rockefeller Fellowship Membership. During this time, he published many papers, such as the "Sociological Roots of Modern Science".

In 1943, he was invited to teach physics at Mills College in California.

Edgar Zilsel died on March 11, 1944, from suicide.

== Life ==
Edgar Zilsel was the youngest child of Jacob Zilsel, a lawyer, and Ina Kollmer. He had two older sisters, Wallie Zilsel and Irma Zilsel. He attended high school at the Franz-Joseph-Gymnasium between 1902 and 1910 and afterwards attended the University of Vienna where he studied philosophy, physics, and mathematics. In 1914, he also served in the military for four months and in 1915, he received his PhD while under the supervision of Heinrich Gomperz. His dissertation was entitled "A Philosophical Investigation of the Law of Large Numbers and Related Laws". After working as a mathematician at an insurance company for a few months, he found a position as a teacher on February 16, 1917. He passed his teacher's examination on November 18, 1918 in mathematics, physics, and natural history.

Although linked to the Vienna Circle, Zilsel critiqued the views of Circle members. He participated actively in working people's education, teaching philosophy and physics at the Vienna People's University.

In 1918 he joined the Austrian Social Democratic Party. and later contributed to their magazine Der Kampf. Following the defeat of the Social Democrats in the Austrian Civil War in 1934, Zilsel was arrested. Although only detained briefly, he was dismissed from his job. He then taught mathematics and physics at a secondary school (Mittelschule) in Vienna.

As a philosopher, he combined Marxist views with the logical positivism of the Vienna Circle. He regularly published articles in academic and socialist journals. An extended version of his PhD thesis was published as a book (The Application Problem: a Philosophical Investigation of the Law of Large Numbers and its Induction). Two other books, The Religion of Genius: A Critical Study of the Modern Ideal of Personality and The Development of the Concept of Genius: a Contribution to the Conceptual History of Antiquity and Early Capitalism were published in 1918 and 1926, respectively.

Zilsel managed to escape from Austria after the Anschluss, first to England and in 1939 to the United States where he received a Rockefeller Fellowship enabling him to devote time to research. He published many papers during these years of exile, including Sociological Roots of Modern Science. In 1943, he was invited by Lynn White to teach physics at Mills College in California, but shortly thereafter committed suicide with an overdose of sleeping pills.

== Thought ==
Zilsel proposed the Zilsel Thesis as an explanation for the rise of Western science. Zilsel claimed that the rise of capitalism led to the interaction of craftspeople with scholars. This interaction in turn led to the beginnings of early modern science. The craftspeople had been for the most part illiterate and looked down upon by the educated classes. The scholars were ignorant of practical craft activity. The intellectual theorizing of the crafts and the absorption of craft knowledge into the investigation of nature led to the development of experimental science.

Another of Zilsel's theories was that the rise of the notion of laws of nature in early modern science was a product of the generalization of the juridical concept of law to natural phenomena. Just as the king lays down the legal laws for the nation, God lays down the laws of nature for the universe.

Zilsel's ideas were used by historian of Chinese science Joseph Needham to account for the lack of experimental science in traditional China, despite the Chinese being in advance of the West in both technology and in many areas of natural history observation.

Zilsel has been praised by historian Clifford D. Conner for having been the first to stress the role of artisans and craftsmen in the development of modern science. According to Conner, the theses of Zilsel were met with resistance at the time of their publication, also due to the author's early death, and his works were later revalued by historians such as Pamela H. Smith. In 2000 Social Studies of Science referred to him as "one of the pioneers of our field".

== Bibliography ==
=== Essays ===
==== Published in English ====
- Copernicus and Mechanics (1940) in Journal of the History of Ideas, Vol. 1, No. 1, pp. 113-118.
- History and Biological Evolution (1940) in Philosophy of Science, Vol. 7, No. 1, pp. 121-128.
- The Origins of William Gilbert's Scientific Method (1941) in Journal of the History of Ideas, Vol. 2, No. 1, pp. 1-32.
- Phenomenology and Natural Science (1941) in Philosophy of Science, Vol. 8, No. 1, pp. 26-32.
- Physics and the Problem of Historico-Sociological Laws (1941) in Philosophy of Science, Vol. 8, No. 4, pp. 567-579.
- The Sociological Roots of Science (1942) in American Journal of Sociology, Vol. 47, No. 4, pp. 544-562.
- The Genesis of the Concept of Physical Law (1942) in The Philosophical Review, Vol. 51, No. 3, pp. 245-279.
- The Genesis of the Concept of Scientific Progress (1945) in Journal of the History of Ideas, Vol. 6, No. 3, pp. 325-349.

==== Published in German ====
- Bemerkungen zur Wissenschaftslogik in Erkenntnis, Vol. 3 (1932/1933), pp. 143-161.
- P. Jordans Versuch, den Vitalismus quantenmechanisch zu retten in Erkenntnis, Vol. 5 (1935), pp. 56-64.

== Sources ==
- Johann Dvorak, Edgar Zilsel, Wissenschaft und Volksbildung. In: Erwachsenenbildung in Österreich. Fachzeitschrift für Mitarbeiter in der Erwachsenenbildung, 45. Jg., 1994, H. 3, S. 7-14.
- J. Dvorak, Edgar Zilsel und die Einheit der Erkenntnis (Vienna: Löcker Verlag, 1981).
- Pamela O. Long, Artisan/Practitioners and the Rise of the New Sciences, 1400-1600 (Corvallis, OR: Oregon State University Press, 2011), 11–15.
- Edgar Zilsel, The Social Origins of Modern Science. eds. Diederick Raven, Wolfgang Krohn, and Robert S. Cohen (Dordrecht: Kluwer Academic Publishers, 2000); ISBN 0-7923-6457-0.
- C. Barbieri, Edgar Zilsel. Ricerche di storia della scienza e della filosofia (Roma: Edizioni Efesto, 2025).
