= Zilsel Thesis =

Theory on Western European science

The Zilsel thesis in the history and philosophy of science proposes an explanation for why modern science emerged in the early 17th century in Western Europe and not in other places or eras.

== The thesis ==
Edgar Zilsel claims that science only emerged when capitalism emerged in Western society due to the changes in society brought on by early capitalism, which undermined collective values, magical thinking, and reliance on authority, fostering instead rational and quantitative thought (Zilsel 2003, 7). This created an environment in which two previously separated social groups could come into contact. These were the academically trained rational thinkers who were always members of the upper classes and what Zilsel calls "superior craftsmen". The academics possessed methodical intellectual training but not practical skills while the craftsmen were skilled in experimentation and causal research but lacked the methodical rational approach acquired from study of the classics.

Zilsel supports his argument with a case study of William Gilbert who, in 1600 and five years before Francis Bacon's The Advancement of Learning, published the first printed book (on magnetism) written by an academically trained scholar based almost entirely on actual observation and experiment. Gilbert rejected authority when it differed from observation and rejected superstitious explanations for physical phenomena. Zilsel details the way in which Gilbert drew on the work of Robert Norman, a navigator and compass maker.

Zilsel also claims that the Renaissance artist-engineers and their like used "quantitative rules of thumb [that are] the forerunners of the physical laws of modern science".(Zilsel 2003, 14) Explaining the origins of modern scientific laws, Zilsel claims that "The law-metaphor originates in the bible" (Zilsel 2003, 109). That is, the concept of scientific laws has its origins in the biblical idea that human existence and nature are governed by laws decreed by God.

The editors of this collection of his work claim that at the time of his death Zilsel was working towards a book combining his claims on the origins of scientific laws with his thesis on the rise of science.
