= Vienna Circle =

1924–1936 group of philosophers and scientists

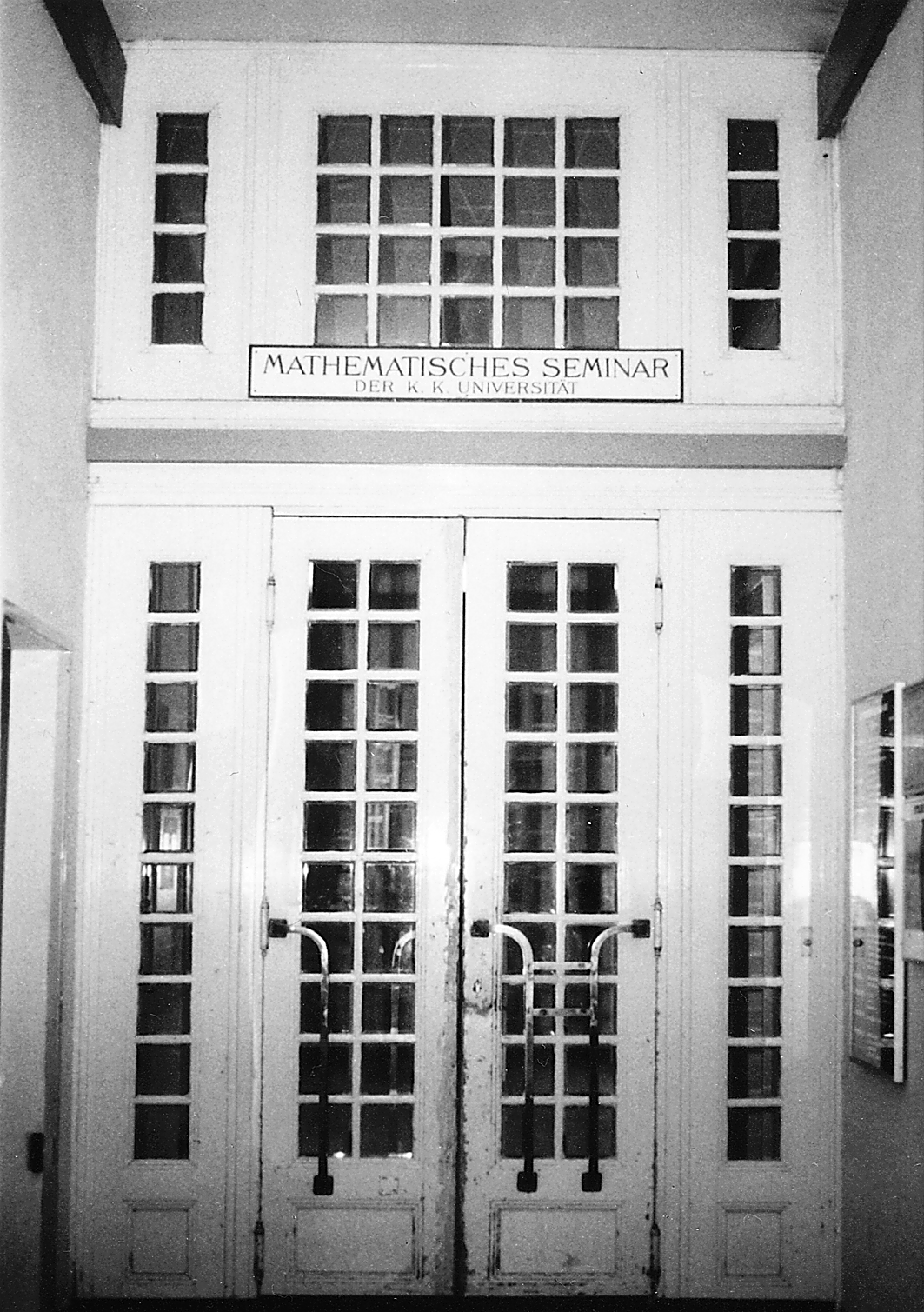
Entrance to the Mathematical Seminar at the University of Vienna, Boltzmanngasse 5. Meeting place of the Vienna Circle

The Vienna Circle (German: Wiener Kreis) of logical empiricism was a group of philosophers and scientists drawn from the natural and social sciences, logic and mathematics who met regularly from 1924 to 1936 at the University of Vienna, chaired by Moritz Schlick. The Vienna Circle had an influence on 20th-century philosophy, especially philosophy of science and analytic philosophy.

The philosophical position of the Vienna Circle was called logical empiricism (German: logischer Empirismus), logical positivism or neopositivism. It was influenced by Ernst Mach, David Hilbert, French conventionalism (Henri Poincaré and Pierre Duhem), Gottlob Frege, Bertrand Russell, Ludwig Wittgenstein and Albert Einstein. The Vienna Circle was pluralistic and committed to the ideals of the Enlightenment. It was unified by the aim of making philosophy scientific with the help of modern logic. Main topics were foundational debates in the natural and social sciences, logic and mathematics; the modernization of empiricism by modern logic; the search for an empiricist criterion of meaning; the critique of metaphysics and the unification of the sciences in the unity of science.

The Vienna Circle appeared in public with the publication of various book series – Schriften zur wissenschaftlichen Weltauffassung (Monographs on the Scientific World-Conception), Einheitswissenschaft (Unified Science) and the journal Erkenntnis – and the organization of international conferences in Prague; Königsberg (today known as Kaliningrad); Paris; Copenhagen; Cambridge, UK, and Cambridge, Massachusetts. Its public profile was provided by the Ernst Mach Society (German: Verein Ernst Mach), through which members of the Vienna Circle sought to popularize their ideas in the context of programmes for popular education in Vienna.

During the era of Austrofascism and after the annexation of Austria by Nazi Germany most members of the Vienna Circle were forced to emigrate. The 1936 murder of Schlick by his former student, Johann Nelböck, effectively brought the Vienna Circle in Austria to an end.

== History ==
The history and development of the Vienna Circle shows various stages:

=== First Vienna Circle (1907–1912) ===
The pre-history of the Vienna Circle began with meetings on the philosophy of science and epistemology from 1907 on, promoted by Philipp Frank, Hans Hahn and Otto Neurath.

Hans Hahn, the oldest of the three (1879–1934), was a mathematician. He received his degree in mathematics in 1902. Afterwards, he studied under the direction of Ludwig Boltzmann in Vienna and David Hilbert, Felix Klein and Hermann Minkowski at Göttingen. In 1905 he received the Habilitation in mathematics. He taught at Innsbruck (1905–1906) and Vienna (from 1909).

Otto Neurath (1882–1945) studied mathematics, political economy, and history in Vienna and Berlin. From 1907 to 1914, he taught in Vienna at the Neue Wiener Handelsakademie (Viennese Commercial Academy). Neurath married Olga, Hahn's sister, in 1911.

Philipp Frank, the youngest of the group (1884–1966), studied physics at Göttingen and Vienna with Ludwig Boltzmann, David Hilbert and Felix Klein. From 1912, he held the chair of theoretical physics at the German University in Prague.

Their meetings were held in Viennese coffeehouses from 1907 onward. Frank remembered:

After 1910 there began in Vienna a movement which regarded Mach's positivist philosophy of science as having great importance for general intellectual life [...] An attempt was made by a group of young men to retain the most essential points of Mach's positivism, especially his stand against the misuse of metaphysics in science. [...] To this group belonged the mathematician H. Hahn, the political economist Otto Neurath, and the author of this book [i.e. Frank], at the time an instructor in theoretical physics in Vienna. [...] We tried to supplement Mach's ideas by those of the French philosophy of science of Henri Poincaré and Pierre Duhem, and also to connect them with the investigations in logic of such authors as Couturat, Schröder, Hilbert, etc.

— Uebel, Thomas, 2003, p. 70.

A number of further authors were discussed in the meetings, such as Franz Brentano, Alexius Meinong, Hermann von Helmholtz, Heinrich Hertz, Edmund Husserl, Sigmund Freud, Bertrand Russell, Alfred North Whitehead, Vladimir Lenin and Gottlob Frege.

Presumably the meetings stopped in 1912, when Frank went to Prague, to hold the chair of theoretical physics left vacant by Albert Einstein. Hahn left Vienna during World War I and returned in 1921.

=== Formative years (1918–1924) ===
The formation of the Vienna Circle began with Hahn returning to Vienna in 1921. Together with the mathematician Kurt Reidemeister he organized seminars on Ludwig Wittgenstein's Tractatus logico-philosophicus and on Whitehead and Russell's Principia Mathematica.

With the support of Hahn, Moritz Schlick was appointed to the chair of philosophy of the inductive sciences at the University of Vienna in 1922 – the chair formerly held by Ernst Mach and partly by Boltzmann. Schlick had already published two important works, Raum und Zeit in der gegenwärtigen Physik (Space and Time in Contemporary Physics) in 1917 and Allgemeine Erkenntnislehre (General Theory of Knowledge) in 1918.

Immediately after Schlick's arrival in Vienna, he organized discussions with the mathematicians around Hahn. In 1924 Schlick's students Friedrich Waismann and Herbert Feigl suggested to their teacher a sort of regular "evening circle". From the winter term 1924 on, regular meetings were held at the Institute of Mathematics in Vienna's Boltzmanngasse 5 on personal invitation by Schlick. These discussions can be seen as the beginning of the Vienna Circle.

=== Non-public phase – Schlick Circle (1924–1928) ===
The group that met from 1924 on was quite diverse and included not only recognized scientists such as Schlick, Hahn, Kraft, Philipp Frank, Neurath, Olga Hahn-Neurath, and Heinrich Gomperz, but also younger students and doctoral candidates. In addition, the group invited foreign visitors.

In 1926 Schlick and Hahn arranged to bring Rudolf Carnap to the University of Vienna as a Privatdozent (private lecturer). Carnap's Logical Structure of the World was intensely discussed in the Circle.

Also Wittgenstein's Tractatus logico-philosophicus was read out loud and discussed. From 1927 on personal meetings were arranged between Wittgenstein and Schlick, Waismann, Carnap and Feigl.

=== Public phase – Schlick Circle and Verein Ernst Mach (1928–1934) ===
In 1928 the Verein Ernst Mach (Ernst Mach Society) was founded, with Schlick as its chairman. The aim of the society was the spreading of a "scientific world conception" through public lectures that were in large part held by members of the Vienna Circle.

In 1929 the Vienna Circle made its first public appearance under this name – invented by Neurath – with the publication of its manifesto Wissenschaftliche Weltauffassung. Der Wiener Kreis (The Scientific Conception of the World. The Vienna Circle also known as Viewing the World Scientifically: The Vienna Circle). The pamphlet is dedicated to Schlick, and its preface was signed by Hahn, Neurath and Carnap.

The manifesto was presented at the Tagung für Erkenntnislehre der exakten Wissenschaften (Conference on the Epistemology of the Exact Sciences) in autumn 1929, organized by the Vienna Circle together with the Berlin Circle. This conference was the first international appearance of logical empiricism (Neurath coined the term in 1931 in his article "Physikalismus") and the first of a number of conferences: Königsberg (1930), Prague (1934), Paris (1935), Copenhague (1936), Cambridge, UK (1938), Cambridge, Mass. (1939), and Chicago (1941).

While primarily known for its views on the natural sciences and metaphysics, the public phase of the Vienna Circle was explicitly political. Neurath and Hahn were both socialists and believed the rejection of magic was a necessary component for liberation of the working classes. The Vienna Circle linked Karl Marx and Friedrich Nietzsche to their political and anti-metaphysical views, indicating a blur between what are now considered two separate schools of contemporary philosophy – analytic philosophy and continental philosophy.

In 1930, the Vienna Circle and the Berlin Society took over the journal Annalen der Philosophie and made it the main journal of logical empiricism under the title Erkenntnis, edited by Carnap and Reichenbach. In addition, the Vienna Circle published a number of book series: Schriften zur wissenschaftlichen Weltauffassung (Monographs on the Scientific World-Conception, ed. by Schlick und Frank, 1928–1937), Einheitswissenschaft (Unified Science, edited by Neurath, 1933–1939), and later the International Encyclopedia of Unified Science (edited by Neurath, Carnap and Charles W. Morris, 1938–1970).

=== Disintegration, emigration, internationalization (1934–1938) ===
From the beginning of the 1930s, the first signs of disintegration appeared for political and racist reasons: Herbert Feigl left Austria in 1930. Carnap was appointed to a chair at Prague University in 1931 and left for Chicago in 1935.

1934 marks an important break: Hahn died after surgery, Neurath fled to Holland because of the victory of Austrofascism in the Austrian Civil War following which the Ernst Mach Society was dissolved for political reasons by the Schuschnigg regime.

The murder of Moritz Schlick by the former student Hans Nelböck for political and personal reasons in 1936 set an end to the meetings of the Schlick Circle.

Some members of the circle such as Kraft, Waismann, Zilsel, Menger and Gomperz continued to meet occasionally. But the annexation of Austria to Nazi Germany in 1938 meant the definite end of the activities of the Vienna Circle in Austria.

With the emigration went along the internationalization of logical empiricism. Many former members of the Vienna Circle and the Berlin Circle emigrated to the English-speaking world where they had some influence on the development of philosophy of science. The unity of science movement for the construction of an International Encyclopedia of Unified Science, promoted mainly by Neurath, Carnap, and Morris, is symptomatic of the internationalization of logical empiricism, organizing numerous international conferences and the publication of the International Encyclopedia of Unified Science.

=== Overview of the members ===
Apart from the central figures of the Schlick Circle, the question of membership in the Vienna Circle is in many cases unsettled. The partition into "members" and "those sympathetic to the Vienna Circle" produced in the manifesto from 1929 is representative only of a specific moment in the development of the Circle. Depending on the criteria used (regular attendance, philosophical affinities etc.) there are different possible distributions in "inner circle" and "periphery".

In the following list (in alphabetical order), the "inner circle" is defined using the criterion of regular attendance. The "periphery" comprises occasional visitors, foreign visitors and leading intellectual figures who stood in regular contact with the Circle (such as Wittgenstein and Popper).

Inner Circle: Gustav Bergmann, Rudolf Carnap, Herbert Feigl, Philipp Frank, Kurt Gödel, Hans Hahn, Olga Hahn-Neurath, Béla Juhos, Felix Kaufmann, Victor Kraft, Karl Menger, Richard von Mises, Otto Neurath, Rose Rand, Josef Schächter, Moritz Schlick, Friedrich Waismann, Edgar Zilsel.

Periphery: Alfred Jules Ayer, Egon Brunswik, Karl Bühler, Josef Frank, Else Frenkel-Brunswik, Heinrich Gomperz, Carl Gustav Hempel, Eino Kaila, Hans Kelsen, Charles W. Morris, Arne Naess, Karl Raimund Popper, Willard Van Orman Quine, Frank P. Ramsey, Hans Reichenbach, Kurt Reidemeister, Alfred Tarski, Olga Taussky-Todd, Ludwig Wittgenstein.

=== Reception in the United States and the United Kingdom ===
The spread of logical positivism in the United States occurred throughout the 1920s and 1930s. In 1929 and in 1932, Schlick was a visiting professor at Stanford, while Feigl, who immigrated to the United States in 1930, became a lecturer (1931) and professor (1933) at the University of Iowa. The definite diffusion of logical positivism in the United States was due to Carl Hempel, Hans Reichenbach, Rudolf Carnap, Philipp Frank, and Herbert Feigl, who emigrated and taught in the United States.

Another link to the United States is Willard Van Orman Quine, who traveled in 1932 and 1933 as a Sheldon Traveling Fellow to Vienna, Prague, and Warsaw. Moreover, American semiotician and philosopher Charles W. Morris helped many German and Austrian philosophers emigrate to the United States, including Rudolf Carnap, in 1936.

In the United Kingdom, it was Alfred Jules Ayer who acquainted the British academia with the work of the Vienna Circle with his book Language, Truth, and Logic (1936). Karl Popper was also important for the reception and critique of their work, even though he never participated in the meetings of the Vienna Circle.

== Congresses and publications ==
The Vienna Circle was very active in advertising their new philosophical ideas. Several congresses on epistemology and philosophy of science were organized, with the help of the Berlin Circle. There were some preparatory congresses: Prague (1929), Königsberg (1930), Prague (1934) and then the first congress on scientific philosophy held in Paris (1935), followed by congresses in Copenhagen (1936), Paris (1937), Cambridge, UK (1938), Cambridge, Massachusetts. (1939). The Königsberg congress (1930) was very important, for Kurt Gödel announced that he had proven the completeness of first-order logic and the incompleteness of formal arithmetic. Another very interesting congress was the one held in Copenhagen (1936), which was dedicated to quantum physics and causality.

Between 1928 and 1937, the Vienna Circle published ten books in a collection named Schriften zur wissenschaftlichen Weltauffassung (Monographs on the Scientific World-Conception), edited by Schlick and Frank. Karl Raimund Popper's book Logik der Forschung was published in this collection. Seven works were published in another collection, called Einheitswissenschaft (Unified Science). In 1930 Rudolf Carnap and Hans Reichenbach undertook the editorship of the journal Erkenntnis, which was published between 1930 and 1940 (from 1939 the editors were Otto Neurath, Rudolf Carnap and Charles Morris).

The following is the list of works published in the two collections edited by the Vienna Circle.

Schriften zur wissenschaftlichen Weltauffassung (Monographs on the Scientific World-Conception), edited by Schlick and Frank:

- Richard von Mises, Wahrscheinlichkeit, Statistik und Wahrheit, 1928 (Probability, Statistics, and Truth, New York: Macmillan company, 1939)
- Rudolf Carnap, Abriss der Logistik, 1929
- Moritz Schlick, Fragen der Ethik, 1930 (Problems of Ethics, New York: Prentice-Hall, 1939)
- Otto Neurath, Empirische Soziologie, 1931
- Philipp Frank, Das Kausalgesetz und seine Grenzen, 1932 (The Law of Causality and its Limits, Dordrecth; Boston: Kluwer, 1997)
- Otto Kant, Zur Biologie der Ethik, 1932
- Rudolf Carnap, Logische Syntax der Sprache, 1934 (The Logical Syntax of Language, New York: Humanities, 1937)
- Karl Raimund Popper, Logik der Forschung, 1934 (The Logic of Scientific Discovery, New York: Basic Books, 1959)
- Josef Schächter, Prolegomena zu einer kritischen Grammatik, 1935 (Prolegomena to a Critical Grammar, Dordrecht; Boston: D. Reidel Pub. Co., 1973)
- Victor Kraft, Die Grundlagen einer wissenschaftliche Wertlehre, 1937 (Foundations for a Scientific Analysis of Value, Dordrecht; Boston: D. Reidel Pub. Co., 1981)

Einheitswissenschaft (Unified Science), edited by Carnap, Frank, Hahn, Neurath, Jørgensen (after Hahn's death), Morris (from 1938):

- Hans Hahn, Logik, Mathematik und Naturerkennen, 1933
- Otto Neurath, Einheitswissenschaft und Psychologie, 1933
- Rudolf Carnap, Die Aufgabe der Wissenschaftlogik, 1934
- Philipp Frank, Das Ende der mechanistischen Physik, 1935
- Otto Neurath, Was bedeutet rationale Wirtschaftsbetrachtung, 1935
- Otto Neurath, E. Brunswik, C. Hull, G. Mannoury, J. Woodger, Zur Enzyklopädie der Einheitswissenschaft. Vorträge, 1938
- Richard von Mises, Ernst Mach und die empiristische Wissenschaftauffassung, 1939

These works are translated in Unified Science: The Vienna Circle Monograph Series Originally Edited by Otto Neurath, Kluwer, 1987.

Monographs, arranged in chronological order, published in the International Encyclopedia of Unified Science:

- Otto Neurath, Niels Bohr, John Dewey, Bertrand Russell, Rudolf Carnap, Charles Morris, Encyclopedia and unified science, 1938, vol.1 n.1
- Charles Morris, Foundations of the theory of signs, 1938, vol.1 n.2
- Victor Lenzen, Procedures of empirical sciences, 1938, vol.1 n.5
- Rudolf Carnap, Foundations of logic and mathematics, 1939, vol.1 n.3
- Leonard Bloomfield, Linguistic aspects of science, 1939, vol.1 n.4
- Ernest Nagel, Principles of the theory of probability, 1939, vol.1 n.6
- John Dewey, Theory of valuation, 1939, vol.2 n.4
- Giorgio de Santillana and Edgar Zilsel, The development of rationalism and empiricism, 1941, vol.2 n.8
- Otto Neurath, Foundations of social sciences, 1944, vol.2 n.1
- Joseph H. Woodger, The technique of theory construction, 1949, vol.2 n.5
- Philipp Frank, Foundations of physics, 1946, vol.1 n.7
- Erwin Finlay-Freundlich, Cosmology, 1951, vol.1 n.8
- Jørgen Jørgensen, The development of logical empiricism, 1951, vol.2 n.9
- Egon Brunswik, The conceptual framework of psychology, 1952, vol.1 n.10
- Carl Hempel, Fundamentals of concept formation in empirical science, 1952, vol.2 n.7
- Felix Mainx, Foundations of biology, 1955, vol.1 n.9
- Abraham Edel, Science and the structure of ethics, 1961, vol.2 n.3
- Thomas S. Kuhn, The structure of scientific revolutions, 1962, vol.2 n.2
- Gerhard Tintner, Methodology of mathematical economics and econometrics, 1968, vol.2 n.6
- Herbert Feigl and Charles Morris, Bibliography and index, 1969, vol.2 n.10

== Topics and debates ==
The Vienna Circle cannot be assigned one single philosophy. First, there existed a plurality of philosophical positions within the Circle, and second, members often changed their views fundamentally in the course of time and in reaction to discussions in the Circle. It thus seems more convenient to speak of "the philosophies (in the plural) of the Vienna Circle".

However, some central topics and debates can be identified.

=== The Manifesto (1929) ===
This states the scientific world-conception of the Vienna Circle, which is characterized "essentially by two features. First, it is empiricist and positivist: there is knowledge only from experience. Second, the scientific world-conception is marked by the application of a certain method, namely logical analysis."

Logical analysis is the method of clarification of philosophical problems; it makes extensive use of symbolic logic and distinguishes the Vienna Circle empiricism from earlier versions. The task of philosophy lies in the clarification—through the method of logical analysis—of problems and assertions.

Logical analysis shows that there are two different kinds of statements; one kind includes statements reducible to simpler statements about the empirically given; the other kind includes statements which cannot be reduced to statements about experience and thus they are devoid of meaning. Metaphysical statements belong to this second kind and therefore they are meaningless. Hence many philosophical problems are rejected as pseudo-problems which arise from logical mistakes, while others are re-interpreted as empirical statements and thus become the subject of scientific inquiries.

One source of the logical mistakes that are at the origins of metaphysics is the ambiguity of natural language. "Ordinary language for instance uses the same part of speech, the substantive, for things ('apple') as well as for qualities ('hardness'), relations ('friendship'), and processes ('sleep'); therefore it misleads one into a thing-like conception of functional concepts". Another source of mistakes is "the notion that thinking can either lead to knowledge out of its own resources without using any empirical material, or at least arrive at new contents by an inference from given states of affair". Synthetic knowledge a priori is rejected by the Vienna Circle. Mathematics, which at first sight seems an example of necessarily valid synthetic knowledge derived from pure reason alone, has instead a tautological character, that is, its statements are analytical statements, thus very different from Kantian synthetic statements. The only two kinds of statements accepted by the Vienna Circle are synthetic statements a posteriori (i.e., scientific statements) and analytic statements a priori (i.e., logical and mathematical statements).

However, the persistence of metaphysics is connected not only with logical mistakes but also with "social and economical struggles". Metaphysics and theology are allied to traditional social forms, while the group of people who "faces modern times, rejects these views and takes its stand on the ground of empirical sciences". Thus the struggle between metaphysics and scientific world-conception is not only a struggle between different kinds of philosophies, but it is also—and perhaps primarily—a struggle between different political, social, and economical attitudes. Of course, as the manifesto itself acknowledged, "not every adherent of the scientific world-conception will be a fighter". Many historians of the Vienna Circle see in the latter sentence an implicit reference to a contrast between the so-called 'left wing' of the Vienna Circle, mainly represented by Neurath and Carnap, and Moritz Schlick. The aim of the left wing was to facilitate the penetration of the scientific world-conception in "the forms of personal and public life, in education, upbringing, architecture, and the shaping of economic and social life". In contrast, Schlick was primarily interested in the theoretical study of science and philosophy. Perhaps the sentence "Some, glad of solitude, will lead a withdrawn existence on the icy slopes of logic" is an ironic reference to Schlick.

The manifesto lists Walter Dubislav, Josef Frank, Kurt Grelling, Hasso Härlen, Eino Kaila, Heinrich Loewy, F. P. Ramsey, Hans Reichenbach, Kurt Reidemeister, and Edgar Zilsel as people "sympathetic to the Vienna Circle" and Albert Einstein, Bertrand Russell, and Ludwig Wittgenstein as "leading representatives of the scientific world-conception".

=== Unified science ===
The final goal pursued by the Vienna Circle was unified science, that is, the construction of a "constitutive system" in which every legitimate statement is reduced to the concepts of lower level which refer directly to the given experience. "The endeavour is to link and harmonise the achievements of individual investigators in their various fields of science". From this aim follows the search for clarity, neatness, and a symbolic language that eliminates the problems arising from the ambiguity of natural language. The Vienna Circle published a collection, called Einheitswissenschaft (Unified Science), edited by Rudolf Carnap, Philipp Frank, Hans Hahn, Otto Neurath, Jørgen Jørgensen (after Hahn's death) and Charles W. Morris (from 1938), whose aim was to present a unified vision of science. After the publication in Europe of seven monographs from 1933 to 1939, the collection was dismissed because of the problems arising from World War II. In 1938, a new series of publications started in the United States. It was the International Encyclopedia of Unified Science, an ambitious project never completed, devoted to unified science. Only the first section, Foundations of the Unity of Sciences, was published; it contains two volumes for a total of twenty monographs published from 1938 to 1969. As remembered by Rudolf Carnap and Charles Morris in the Preface to the 1969 edition of the International Encyclopedia of Unified Science:

The Encyclopedia was in origin the idea of Otto Neurath. It was meant as a manifestation of the unity of science movement [...] Original plans for the Encyclopedia were ambitious. In addition to the two introductory volumes, there was to be a section on the methodology of the sciences, one on the existing state of the unification of sciences, and possibly a section on the application of the sciences. It was planned that the work in its entirety would comprise about twenty-six volumes (260 monographs)

— Foundations of the Unity of Sciences, vol. 1, The University of Chicago Press, 1969, p. vii.

Thomas Kuhn's well-known work, The Structure of Scientific Revolutions, was published in this Encyclopedia in 1962, as the number two in the second volume.

=== Critique of metaphysics ===
The attitude of the Vienna Circle towards metaphysics is well expressed by Carnap in the article 'Überwindung der Metaphysik durch Logische Analyse der Sprache' in Erkenntnis, vol. 2, 1932 (English translation 'The Elimination of Metaphysics Through Logical Analysis of Language' in Sarkar, Sahotra, ed., Logical empiricism at its peak: Schlick, Carnap, and Neurath, New York: Garland Pub., 1996, pp. 10–31). A language—says Carnap—consists of a vocabulary, i.e., a set of meaningful words, and a syntax, i.e., a set of rules governing the formation of sentences from the words of the vocabulary. Pseudo-statements, i.e., sequences of words that at first sight resemble statements but in reality have no meaning, are formed in two ways: either meaningless words occur in them, or they are formed in an invalid syntactical way. According to Carnap, pseudo-statements of both kinds occur in metaphysics.

A word W has a meaning if two conditions are satisfied. First, the mode of the occurrence of W in its elementary sentence form (i.e., the simplest sentence form in which W is capable of occurring) must be fixed. Secondly, if W occurs in an elementary sentence S, it is necessary to give an answer to the following questions (that are—according to Carnap—equivalent formulation of the same question):

- What sentences is S deducible from, and what sentences are deducible from S?
- Under what conditions is S supposed to be true, and under what conditions false?
- How is S verified?
- What is the meaning of S?

(Carnap, "The Elimination of Metaphysics Through Logical Analysis of Language" in Sarkar, Sahotra 1996, p. 12)

An example offered by Carnap concerns the word 'arthropod'. The sentence form "the thing x is an arthropod" is an elementary sentence form that is derivable from "x is an animal", "x has a segmented body" and "x has jointed legs". Conversely, these sentences are derivable from "the thing x is an arthropod". Thus the meaning of the word 'arthropod' is determined.

According to Carnap, many words of metaphysics do not fulfill these requirements and thus they are meaningless. As an example, Carnap considers the word 'principle'. This word has a definite meaning if the sentence "x is the principle of y" is supposed to be equivalent to the sentence "y exists by virtue of x" or "y arises out of x". The latter sentence is perfectly clear: y arises out of x when x is invariably followed by y, and the invariable association between x and y is empirically verifiable. But—says Carnap—metaphysicians are not satisfied with this interpretation of the meaning of 'principle'. They assert that no empirical relation between x and y can completely explain the meaning of "x is the principle of y", because there is something that cannot be grasped by means of experience, something for which no empirical criterion can be specified. It is the lack of any empirical criterion, Carnap argues, that deprives the word "principle" of meaning when it occurs in metaphysics. Therefore, metaphysical pseudo-statements such as "water is the principle of the world" or "the spirit is the principle of the world" are void of meaning because a meaningless word occurs in them.

However, there are pseudo-statements in which occur only meaningful words; these pseudo-statements are formed in a counter-syntactical way. An example is the word sequence "Caesar is a prime number"; every word has a definite meaning, but the sequence has no meaning. The problem is that "prime number" is a predicate of numbers, not a predicate of human beings. In the example, the nonsense is evident; however, in natural language the rules of grammar do not prohibit the formation of analogous meaningless word sequences that are not so easily detectable. In the grammar of natural languages, every sequence of the kind "x is y", where x is a noun and y is a predicate, is acceptable. In fact, in the grammar there is no distinction between predicate which can be affirmed of human beings and predicate which can be affirmed of numbers. So "Caesar is a general" and "Caesar is a prime number" are both well-formed, in contrast for example with "Caesar is and", which is ill-formed. In a logically constructed language—says Carnap—a distinction between the various kinds of predicate is specified, and pseudo-statements as "Caesar is a prime number" are ill-formed. Now, and this is the main point of Carnap's argument, metaphysical statements in which meaningless words do not occur are indeed meaningless because they are formed in a way which is admissible in natural languages, but not in logically constructed languages. Carnap attempts to indicate the most frequent sources of errors from which metaphysical pseudo-statements can arise. One source of mistakes is the ambiguity of the verb "to be", which is sometimes used as a copula ("I am hungry"), and sometimes to designate existence ("I am"). The latter statement incorrectly suggests a predicative form, and thus it suggests that existence is a predicate. Only modern logic, with the introduction of an explicit sign to designate existence (the sign $\exists \;$), which occurs only in statements such as $\exists \;xP(x)$, never as a predicate, has shown that existence is not a predicate, and thus has revealed the logical error from which pseudo-statements such as "cogito, ergo sum" have arisen.

Another source of mistakes is type confusions, in which a predicate of one kind is used as a predicate of another kind. For example, the pseudo-statement "we know the Nothing" is analogous to "we know the rain", but while the latter is well-formed, the former is ill-formed, at least in a logically constructed language, because "Nothing" is incorrectly used as a noun. In a formal language, "Nothing" only means $\lnot \;\exists \;x$, such as "there is nothing which is outside"—i.e., $\lnot \;\exists \;xO(x)$, and thus "Nothing" never occurs as a noun or as a predicate, but as a quantifier.

According to Carnap, although metaphysics has no theoretical content, it does have content: metaphysical pseudo-statements express the attitude of a person towards life, and this is the role of metaphysics. He compares it to an art like lyrical poetry; the metaphysician works with the medium of the theoretical; he confuses art with science, attitude towards life with knowledge, and thus produces an unsatisfactory and inadequate work. "Metaphysicians are musicians without musical ability".

== Institute Vienna Circle / Vienna Circle Society ==
In 1991 the Institute Vienna Circle (IVC) was established as a society in Vienna. It is dedicated to studying the work and influence of the Vienna Circle. In 2011 it was integrated in the University of Vienna as a subunit of the Faculty of Philosophy and Education. Since 2016 the former society continues its activities in close cooperation with the IVC under the changed name Vienna Circle Society (VCS). In 2015 the institute co-organized an exhibition on the Vienna Circle in the main building of the University of Vienna.

== See also ==
- Formalism (mathematics)
- Logical behaviorism
- Logicism
- List of Austrian intellectual traditions

== Bibliography ==
=== Primary literature ===
- Carnap, Rudolf. "Überwindung der Metaphysik durch Logische Analyse der Sprache" in Erkenntnis, vol. 2, 1932 (English translation "The Elimination of Metaphysics Through Logical Analysis of Language" in Sarkar, Sahotra, ed., Logical empiricism at its peak: Schlick, Carnap, and Neurath, New York : Garland Pub., 1996, pp. 10–31)
- Neurath, Otto and Carnap, Rudolf and Morris, Charles W. Foundations of the Unity of Sciences, vol. 1, Chicago : The University of Chicago Press, 1969.
- Wissenschaftliche Weltauffassung. Der Wiener Kreis, 1929. English translation The Scientific Conception of the World. The Vienna Circle in Sarkar, Sahotra, ed., The Emergence of Logical Empiricism: from 1900 to the Vienna Circle, New York : Garland Publishing, 1996, pp. 321–340
- Stadler, Friedrich and Uebel, Thomas (eds.): Wissenschaftliche Weltauffassung. Der Wiener Kreis. Hrsg. vom Verein Ernst Mach (1929). Reprint of the first edition. With translations into English, French, Spanish and Italian. Vienna: Springer, 2012.
- Stöltzner, Michael and Uebel, Thomas (eds.). Wiener Kreis. Texte zur wissenschaftlichen Weltauffassung. Meiner, Hamburg, 2006, ISBN 3-7873-1811-9. (Anthology in German)

=== Secondary literature ===
- Arnswald, Ulrich, Stadler, Friedrich and Weibel, Peter (ed.): Der Wiener Kreis – Aktualität in Wissenschaft, Literatur, Architektur und Kunst. Wien: LIT Verlag 2019. ISBN 978-3-643-50937-6
- Ayer, Alfred Jules. Language, Truth and Logic. London, Victor Gollancz, 1936.
- Ayer, Alfred Jules. Logical Positivism. Glencoe, Ill: Free Press, 1959.
- Barone, Francesco. Il neopositivismo logico. Roma Bari: Laterza, 1986.
- Bergmann, Gustav. The Metaphysics of Logical Positivism. New York: Longmans Green, 1954.
- Cirera, Ramon. Carnap and the Vienna Circle: Empiricism and Logical Syntax. Atlanta, GA: Rodopi, 1994.
- Damböck, Christian (2013). "Nachwort" (PDF). In Damböck, Christian (ed.). Der Wiener Kreis – Ausgewählte Texte (in German). Stuttgart: Reclam. pp. 227–244.
- Frank, Philipp: Modern Science and its Philosophy. Cambridge, 1949.
- Friedman, Michael, Reconsidering Logical Positivism. Cambridge, UK: Cambridge University Press, 1999.
- Gadol, Eugene T. Rationality and Science: A Memorial Volume for Moritz Schlick in Celebration of the Centennial of his Birth. Wien: Springer, 1982.
- Geymonat, Ludovico. La nuova filosofia della natura in Germania. Torino, 1934.
- Giere, Ronald N. and Richardson, Alan W. Origins of Logical Empiricism. Minneapolis: University of Minnesota Press, 1997.
- Haller, Rudolf. Neopositivismus. Eine historische Einführung in die Philosophie des Wiener Kreises. Wissenschaftliche Buchgesellschaft, Darmstadt, 1993, ISBN 3-534-06677-4. (German)
- Holt, Jim. "Positive Thinking" (review of Karl Sigmund, Exact Thinking in Demented Times: The Vienna Circle and the Epic Quest for the Foundations of Science, Basic Books, 449 pp.), The New York Review of Books, vol. LXIV, no. 20 (21 December 2017), pp. 74–76.
- Kraft, Victor. The Vienna Circle: The Origin of Neo-positivism, a Chapter in the History of Recent Philosophy. New York: Greenwood Press, 1953.
- Limbeck, Christoph and Stadler, Friedrich (eds.). The Vienna Circle. Texts and Pictures of an Exhibition. Münster-Berlin-London 2015. ISBN 978-3-643-90649-6
- McGuinness, Brian. Wittgenstein and the Vienna Circle: Conversations Recorded by Friedrich Waismann. Trans. by Joachim Schulte and Brian McGuinness. New York: Barnes & Noble Books, 1979.
- Parrini, Paolo; Salmon, Wesley C.; Salmon, Merrilee H. (ed.) Logical Empiricism – Historical and Contemporary Perspectives, Pittsburgh: University of Pittsburgh Press, 2003.
- Reisch, George. How the Cold War Transformed Philosophy of Science : To the Icy Slopes of Logic. New York: Cambridge University Press, 2005.
- Rescher, Nicholas (ed.). The Heritage of Logical Positivism. University Press of America, 1985.
- Richardson, Alan W. "The Scientific World Conception. Logical Positivism", in: T. Baldwin (Hg.), The Cambridge History of Philosophy, 1870–1945, 2003, 391–400.
- Richardson, Alan W. and Uebel, Thomas (ed.). The Cambridge Companion to Logical Empiricism. Cambridge, 2007.
- Salmon, Wesley and Wolters, Gereon (ed.), Logic, Language, and the Structure of Scientific Theories: Proceedings of the Carnap-Reichenbach Centennial, University of Konstanz, 21–24 May 1991, Pittsburgh: University of Pittsburgh Press, 1994.
- Sarkar, Sahotra. The Emergence of Logical Empiricism: From 1900 to the Vienna Circle. New York: Garland Publishing, 1996.
- Sarkar, Sahotra. Logical Empiricism at its Peak: Schlick, Carnap, and Neurath. New York: Garland Pub., 1996.
- Sarkar, Sahotra. Logical Empiricism and the Special Sciences: Reichenbach, Feigl, and Nagel. New York: Garland Pub., 1996.
- Sarkar, Sahotra. Decline and Obsolescence of Logical Empiricism: Carnap vs. Quine and the Critics. New York: Garland Pub., 1996.
- Sarkar, Sahotra. The Legacy of the Vienna Circle: Modern Reappraisals. New York: Garland Pub., 1996.
- Spohn, Wolfgang (ed.), Erkenntnis Orientated: A Centennial Volume for Rudolf Carnap and Hans Reichenbach, Boston: Kluwer Academic Publishers, 1991.
- Stadler, Friedrich. The Vienna Circle. Studies in the Origins, Development, and Influence of Logical Empiricism. New York: Springer, 2001. – 2nd Edition: Dordrecht: Springer, 2015.
- Stadler, Friedrich (ed.). The Vienna Circle and Logical Empiricism. Re-evaluation and Future Perspectives. Dordrecht – Boston London, Kluwer, 2003.
- Uebel, Thomas. Vernunftkritik und Wissenschaft: Otto Neurath und der erste Wiener Kreis. Wien-New York 2000. (German)
- Uebel, Thomas, "On the Austrian Roots of Logical Empiricism" in Logical Empiricism – Historical and contemporary Perspectives, ed. Paolo Parrini, Wesley C. Salmon, Merrilee H. Salmon, Pittsburgh : University of Pittsburgh Press, 2003, pp. 76–93.
