= Open texture =

Philosophical term introduced by Friedrich Waismann

Open texture is a term in the philosophy of Friedrich Waismann, first introduced in his paper "Verifiability" to refer to the universal possibility of vagueness in empirical statements. He had coined the phrase "die Porosität der Begriffe" ("the porosity of concepts") for this purpose and credits William Kneale for suggesting the English term that he then adopted. It is an application of some of the ideas that would later appear in Wittgenstein's Philosophical Investigations, particularly Section 80. The concept has become important in criticism of verificationism and has also found use in legal philosophy.

In legal philosophy, open texture reinforces the notion that vagueness is an inevitable feature of legal languages. Legal philosophers who subscribe to Waismann's view believe that such "vagueness" solves the conceptual confusions of ordinary language. According to H. L. A. Hart, for instance, language in legal rules has open texture and that recognizing this view would lead to better policy outcomes. Another interpretation also cited that open texture is closely related to the concept of "unforeseen contingencies" in the economic field.
