= Friedrich Stadler =

Austrian historian and philosopher

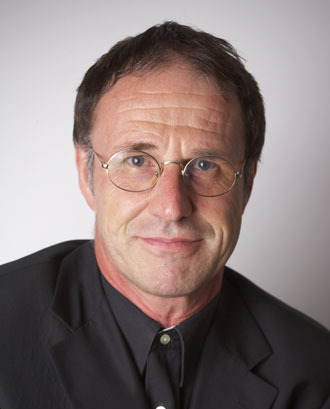
- Friedrich Stadler (2006)
- Born: July 17, 1951 (age 74); Zeltweg, Styria, Austria
- Occupations: Historian, professor, philosopher

Friedrich Stadler (born July 17, 1951, in Zeltweg, Styria) is an Austrian historian and philosopher and professor for history and philosophy of science at the University of Vienna. He is the founder (in 1991) and long-time director of the Institute Vienna Circle, which was established as a Department of the Faculty of Philosophy and Education of the Vienna University in May 2011. Currently he is a permanent fellow of this department and serves at the same time as the Director of the co-operating Vienna Circle Society, which is the continuation of the former Institute Vienna Circle as an extra-university institution.

== Education ==
Stadler studied philosophy, psychology, education and history at the University of Graz and the University of Salzburg. In 1977 he obtained his Magister degree. After teaching at high schools for several years, he completed his Ph.D. in 1982.

== Academia ==
=== Teaching ===
Since 1989 Stadler has held teaching positions at the University of Vienna. In 1997 he became associate professor at the University of Vienna. In 2008 Stadler was appointed Professor for History and Philosophy of Science at the University of Vienna (joint appointment of the Faculty of Philosophy and Education and the Faculty of Historical and Cultural Studies).

=== Research ===
Stadler's main research interests are modern history and philosophy of science, intellectual history and exile studies, the history, theories and methods of the cultural studies, contemporary history of the Vienna University, and Austrian history of philosophy and science with a special focus on the Vienna Circle and logical empiricism. In this field his international expertise is documented by two books he has written (on Ernst Mach and on the Vienna Circle in German, English and Spanish) and his editorship of many volumes in connection with his activities as chair and director of the Institute Vienna Circle resp. Vienna Circle Society.

He was involved in various research projects at the Institute for Science and the Arts and the Ludwig Boltzmann Institute for History and Society in Salzburg and Vienna, and he conducted several research projects funded by the Austrian Science Fund (FWF).

=== Administration and service ===
From 2001 to 2018 he has organized the yearly "Vienna International Summer University – Scientific World Conceptions". He initiated and co-ordinated the interdisciplinary Master studies program "History and Philosophy of Science" and was a member of the faculty of the Ph.D. program "The Sciences in Historical, Philosophical, and Cultural Contexts" at the University of Vienna. From 2009 to 2013 he served as president of the European Philosophy of Science Association (EPSA). Since 2007 he was an assessor and advisor for the International Union for History and Philosophy of Science/Division of Logic, Methodology and Philosophy of Science (DLMPS). From 2015 to 2018 he served as President of the Austrian Ludwig Wittgenstein Society. From 2005 to 2013 he worked as a member of the Kuratorium (reporter for philosophy) of the Austrian Science Fund (FWF).

He is a board member of the journals General Philosophy of Science, European Journal of Philosophy of Science, Journal for the History of Philosophy of Science.

He was the project leader of research projects on the history of philosophy of science, of the Forum Contemporary History of the University of Vienna at the Department of Contemporary History, which he headed from 2001 to 2008 and where he was in charge of a commission investigating the history of the Vienna University on the occasion of its 650th anniversary in 2015, for which he is the series and volume editor of 5 volumes on its history.

In addition, Stadler headed the scientific advisory board of the Austrian Society of Exile Studies.

Since 2016 he is a member of the Commission for History and Philosophy of Science of the Austrian Academy of Sciences (ÖAW).

=== Visiting professorships ===
Stadler was visiting professor at the Humboldt University Berlin (Department of Philosophy), the University of Minnesota (Minnesota Center for Philosophy of Science and Center for Austrian Studies), University of Tübingen (From Scientiarum), and fellow at the University of Helsinki (Helsinki Collegium for Advanced Studies).

== Awards ==
In 2014 Stadler was awarded the Grand Decoration of Honour for Services to the Republic of Austria. In 2016 he received the Jan Patočka Medal of the Czech Academy of Sciences. In 2017 he was awarded the George Sarton Medal for History of Science of the Ghent University.

== Publications (selection) ==
A complete list of Stadler's publications can be found on the homepage of the Vienna Circle Society.

Author:

- Vom Positivismus zur 'Wissenschaftlichen Weltauffassung'. Am Beispiel der Wirkungsgeschichte von Ernst Mach in Österreich von 1895 bis 1934. Löcker, Wien/München 1982. ISBN 3-85409-038-2
- Studien zum Wiener Kreis. Ursprung, Entwicklung und Wirkung des Logischen Empirismus im Kontext. Suhrkamp, Frankfurt am Main 1997. ISBN 3-518-58207-0, Second edition Springer 2015: ISBN 978-3-319-16047-4
- The Vienna Circle. Studies in the Origins, Development, and Influence of Logical Empiricism. Springer, Wien and New York 2001. ISBN 3-211-83243-2, 2nd edition Springer 2015: ISBN 978-3-319-16560-8
- El Círculo de Viena. Empirismo lógico, ciencia, cultura y politica. Fondo de cultura Económica. Chile 2011. ISBN 978-956-289-085-4

Series Editor:

- (Ed.): Institute Vienna Circle Yearbook. Springer 1993ff.
- (Ed.): Veröffentlichungen des Instituts Wiener Kreis. Springer 1991 ff.
- (Ed.): Ernst Mach Studienausgabe. Xenomoi Verlag, Berlin 2008ff. ISBN 978-3-936532-91-3
- (Ed.): Emigration – Exil – Kontinuität. Schriften zur zeitgeschichtlichen Kultur- und Wissenschaftsforschung. LIT Verlag 2004ff.
- (Co-ed. with Hans-Jürgen Wendel): Moritz Schlick. Kritische Gesamtausgabe. Springer, Wien und New York, 2006ff. ISBN 978-3-211-29789-6
- (Ed.): 650 Jahre Universität Wien – Aufbruch ins neue Jahrhundert. 5 Bände. Göttingen: Vienna University Press 2015.

Editor (Selection):

- (Ed.): Kontinuität und Bruch 1938 – 1945 – 1955. Beiträge zur österreichischen Kultur- und Wissenschaftsgeschichte. LIT-Verlag, Münster 2004. ISBN 3-8258-7489-3
- (Ed.): Vertriebene Vernunft. Emigration und Exil österreichischer Wissenschaft. 2 Volumes. Jugend und Volk, Wien/München 1987/88. New Edition: LIT-Verlag 2004. ISBN 3-8258-7373-0 ISBN 3-8258-7372-2 (Band 1) / ISBN 3-8258-7373-0 (Band 2.1) / ISBN 3-8258-7373-0 (Band 2.2)
- (Ed.): Vertreibung, Transformation und Rückkehr der Wissenschaftstheorie am Beispiel von Rudolf Carnap und Wolfgang Stegmüller. LIT-Verlag, Wien 2010. ISBN 978-3-643-50165-3
- (Co-ed. with Kurt R. Fischer): Paul Feyerabend. Ein Philosoph aus Wien. Springer, Wien/New York: 2006. ISBN 3-211-29759-6
- (Co-ed. with Eric Kandel, Walter Kohn, Fritz Stern und Anton Zeilinger): Österreichs Umgang mit dem Nationalsozialismus. Die Folgen für die naturwissenschaftliche und humanistische Lehre. Springer, Wien/New York 2004. ISBN 3-211-21537-9
- Ernst Mach – Work, Life, Influence. (= Vienna Circle Institute Yearbook 22). Cham: Springer Nature Switzerland AG 2019. 742ff. ISBN 978-3-030-04377-3 und ISBN 978-3-030-04378-0 (eBook).
- Ernst Mach. Zu Leben, Werk und Wirkung. (= Veröffentlichungen des Instituts Wiener Kreis 29). Cham: Springer Nature Switzerland AG 2019. 170ff. ISBN 978-3-030-03771-0 und ISBN 978-3-030-03772-7 (eBook).
- (Hrsg. mit Gergely Ambrus): Austrian Philosophy. (= Hungarian Philosophical Review, Vol. 62 (2018/4). ISSN 0025-0090.
