= Per Pålsson =

Swedish murderer

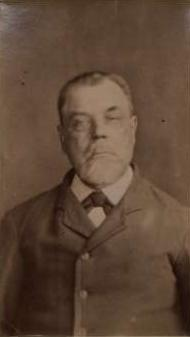
Per Pålsson in a photo taken at the time of his release, 1868

Per Pålsson (16 September 1828 – 4 February 1914), also called Kitte-Pelle, was a Swedish murderer convicted for the murder of Hanna Pålsdotter. Per Pålsson was in the end pardoned and instead of having to face the death penalty was sentenced to life imprisonment. He served time at Örkelljunga prison, Varberg Fortress and finally Malmö central prison. He was finally pardoned fully and released on 31 May 1868.

== Early life ==
Per Pålsson was born in Östra Tockarp, Örkelljunga.

== Life of crime ==
The first time Per Pålsson was convicted for a crime was in 1846, he was at that time 18 years old and stood accused of a number of thefts in Örkelljunga and Vedby. He was sentenced to 10 days imprisonment and to work for the local church in Örkelljunga. The second time Per Pålsson was caught in an act of crime was in 1848. He had then committed a number of thefts in the southern parts of Åsbo and stolen a number of knives and 288 buttons from a Per Månsson in Kyrkolycke. In May Per Pålsson was sentenced to 24 days imprisonment for the crimes.

Hanna Pålsdotter was born on 2 September 1847 in Lemmeshult. He died on 24 December 1868 during a robbery gone wrong, ending in Hanna being shot. The Härads court sentenced Pålsson on 21 May 1853 for the robbery and murder of Hanna Pålsdotter, and he was sentenced to Uppenbar kyrkoplikt, to be whipped and to the death penalty by decapitation. His sentence was in the end reversed to imprisonment, obligatory church duties and life imprisonment on 11 August 1853.

However, on 31 May 1868, he was fully pardoned and released from prison. He died on 4 February 1914.

== In media ==
A book by Christine Billing, Helene Ehriander, January Garpenhus and Helena Holmkrantz, called Ödes julen i Lemmeshult 1868 covering the murder and its aftermath was published in 1985.
