= Friedrich Waismann =

Austrian mathematician, physicist and philosopher (1896–1959)

- Born: March 21, 1896; Vienna, Austria-Hungary
- Died: November 4, 1959 (aged 63); Oxford, England

Education
- Education: University of Vienna (PhD, 1936)
- Doctoral advisor: Robert Reininger; Moritz Schlick

Philosophical work
- School: Analytic philosophy Logical positivism
- Institutions: University of Vienna; University of Cambridge; University of Oxford
- Main interests: Philosophy of mathematics Philosophy of language Philosophy of science
- Notable ideas: Open texture

Friedrich Waismann (/ˈvaɪsmɑːn/; German: [ˈvaɪsman]; 21 March 1896 – 4 November 1959) was an Austrian mathematician, physicist, and philosopher. He is best known for being a member of the Vienna Circle and one of the key theorists in logical positivism.

== Biography ==
Born to a Jewish family in Vienna, Austria-Hungary, Waismann was educated at the University of Vienna. From 1917 to 1922 he studied philosophy, physics and mathematics there taught by, among others, the mathematician Hans Hahn and the philosopher Alois Höfler. In 1922, he came under the tutelage of Moritz Schlick, the founder of the Vienna Circle, to whom he had intended to submit a doctoral thesis. Waismann repeatedly changed dissertation topic however and only obtained his doctoral degree some months after Schick's murder in 1936, under the 'expedient' direction of Robert Reininger. He obtained a temporary position at Cambridge in the autumn of 1937, the annexation of Austria by Nazi Germany in 1938 made him a refugee. He was a reader in philosophy of science at the University of Cambridge from 1937 to 1939, and lecturer in philosophy of mathematics at the University of Oxford from 1939 until his death.

Waismann lost his wife Hermine née Antscherl, and his only child Thomas to suicide (in, respectively, 1942 and 1952). He died in Oxford in 1959.

== Relationship with Wittgenstein ==
After considerable correspondence, Schlick first met Ludwig Wittgenstein in 1927. The two met several times before the Wittgenstein would agree to be introduced to some of Schlick's circle. From 1927 to 1928 Wittgenstein met with a circle including Schlick, almost always Waismann, sometimes Rudolf Carnap, and sometimes Herbert Feigl and his future wife Maria Kesper. But it is doubtful that Wittgenstein ever attended any meetings of the Vienna Circle proper. From 1929, Wittgenstein's contact with the Circle was restricted to meetings with Schlick and Waismann alone.

These later meetings (December 1929 up to March 1932) were recorded by Waismann, and eventually published in English translation in Ludwig Wittgenstein and the Vienna Circle (1979). By the time these conversations began, Schlick had tasked Waismann with writing an exposition of Wittgenstein's philosophy. This project would undergo radical transformation but the final text, inspired by Wittgenstein but very much Waismann's own work, was published posthumously in English as The Principles of Linguistic Philosophy in 1965. Further material and notes from the period were published in English under the editorship of Gordon Baker in 2003.

Waismann later accused Wittgenstein of obscurantism because of what he considered to be his betrayal of the project of logical positivism and empirically-based explanation.

== Philosophy ==
=== Linguistic philosophy and logical positivism ===
In Introduction to Mathematical Thinking: The Formation of Concepts in Modern Mathematics (1936), Waismann argued that mathematical truths are true by convention rather than being necessarily (or verifiably) true. His collected papers were published posthumously in How I See Philosophy (1968, ed. R. Harré) and Philosophical Papers (1976, ed. B. F. McGuinness).

=== Open texture ===
Waismann introduced the concept of open texture. He had coined the phrase "die Porosität der Begriffe" ("the porosity of concepts") for this purpose and credits William Kneale for suggesting the English term he then adopted. The idea, according to Anthony Quinton, is that the rules governing the use of the expressions of ordinary discourse cover only broadly familiar contingencies and not more surprising possibilities:

Waismann's point is not so much that words of common speech are vague, that there are borderline cases in which we cannot decide whether to apply them or not ... it is rather that the operative criteria for their application are in practice only satisfied when certain other conditions ... are satisfied as well. What we should say in a conceivable case where the criteria are satisfied but the ordinarily accompanying conditions are not is thus indeterminate.

Simon Blackburn (1996) offers an example:

the term “mother” is not vague, but its open texture is revealed if through technological advance differences open up between the mother that produces the ovum, the mother that carries the foetus to term, and the mother that rears the baby. It will then be fruitless to pursue the question of which is the ‘real’ mother, since the term is not adapted to giving a decision in the new circumstance.

Waismann claimed "open texture is a universal property of empirical terms" and that "even after measures are taken to make an expression precise ... there are an indefinite number of possibilities for which it is indeterminate whether the expression applies." The idea is probably based, Brian Bix suggests, "on a constructivist view of language Wittgenstein put forward in the early 1930s."

Open texture has been found in legal philosophy through the writings of H. L. A. Hart (see Hart's "Formalism and Rule Scepticism" in The Concept of Law). According to Hart, vagueness constitutes a fundamental feature of legal languages. It is claimed, however, that Waismann's conceptualization has limited practical application, since it is more for the extraordinary, while Hart's view of open texture concerns the more mundane, approaching the term in the context of a particular norm.

== Selected bibliography ==
Articles

- "Die Natur des Reduzibilitätsaxioms", Monatshefte für Mathematik und Physik 35, 1928, pp. 143–146.
  - translated as "The Nature of the Axiom of Reducibility" in Philosophical Papers (1976)
- "Logische Analyse des Wahrscheinlichkeitsbegriffs", Erkenntnis, Vol. 1 (1930/1931), pp. 228–248.
  - translated as "A Logical Analysis of the Concept of Probability" in Philosophical Papers (1976)
- "Über den Begriff der Identität Erkenntnis, Vol. 6 (1936), pp. 56-64.
  - translated as "The Concept of Identity" in Philosophical Papers (1976)
- "De beteekenis van Moritz Schlick voor de wijsbegeerte", Synthese, Vol. 1, No. 12 (1936), pp. 361–370.
  - translated as "Moritz Schlick's Significance for Philosophy" in Philosophical Papers (1976)
- "Was ist logische Analyse?", The Journal of Unified Science (Erkenntnis), Vol. 8, No. 5/6 (Apr. 1, 1940), pp. 265–289.
  - translated as "What is Logical Analysis?" in Philosophical Papers (1976)
- "Verifiability", Proceedings of the Aristotelian Society, Supplementary Volumes Vol. 19, (1945), pp. 119–150
- "The Many-Level-Structure of Language" Synthese, Vol. 5, No. 5/6 (Sep.-Oct., 1946), pp. 221–229.
- "Logische und Psychologische Aspekte in der Sprachbetrachtung", Synthese, Vol. 6, No. 9/12 (1947/1948), pp. 460–475.
- "Analytic-Synthetic", Analysis, Vol. 10, No. 2 (Dec., 1949), pp. 25–40.
- "Analytic-Synthetic II", Analysis, Vol. 11, No. 2 (Dec., 1950), pp. 25–38.
- “How I See Philosophy” in H. D. Lewis (ed.) Contemporary British Philosophy: Personal Statements. (1956)
- "II: Notes on Talks with Wittgenstein", The Philosophical Review, Vol. 74, No. 1 (Jan., 1965), pp. 12–16.
