= Leinfellner =

Leinfellner is a surname. Notable people with the surname include:

- Elisabeth Leinfellner (1938–2010), linguist and philosopher of Science
- Werner Leinfellner (1921–2010), philosopher of Science
