= C. Douglas McGee =

American professor of philosophy

C. Douglas McGee (1926–1993) was a 20th-century American professor of philosophy at Bowdoin College.

== Background ==
Charles Douglas McGee was born in 1926. He spent his early years in Oklahoma and served in Army infantry during World War II. In 1949, he graduated from Northwestern University and in 1950 obtained an MA. In 1957, he received a doctorate from Harvard University.

== Career ==
McGee taught at Vassar College for nearly 10 years.

In 1963, he joined the Bowdoin College faculty as associate professor of philosophy. In 1967, he was promoted to full professor. He served as chairman of Bowdoin's department of philosophy several times. On June 30, 1993, he became professor emeritus.

== Personal life and death ==
McGee married Rose Adamek in 1950, and they had one daughter and one son. They divorced in 1972 and he later married Phoebe Hurley.

In 1953, while a doctoral candidate at Harvard University, McGee wrote a letter to Life magazine in response to the essay "Is Academic Freedom in Danger?" by Whittaker Chambers, stating:

Sirs:
When a mob is in action, the number of its leaders is less important than the nature and consequence of their influence. The extent of the influence of those now alleged to be threatening academic freedom is not to be measured by the number of investigating congressmen, nor even in the comic or unpleasant posturings of local vigilante groups, but in the confused and suspicious attitude of the American public. A citizenry led to mistrust academic freedom by some political leaders and some of its press is only too likely to rise in righteous panic and crush those freedoms. If academic people seem over sensitive, it is because they occupy exposed positions, and in a general attack are not only the first to falI but may fall long before their fellow citizens discover an assault is under way. Though Mr. Chambers would have us believe alarms from academic outposts are false, his "argument" fails to support that conclusion.
C. Douglas McGee
Cambridge, MA

For many years McGee attended the International Wittgenstein Symposium in Kirchberg am Wechsel, Neunkirchen district, Lower Austria, Austria. He retired there in 1993 and died there age 67 on December 22, 1993, from a heart attack.

== Works ==
In his book The Recovery of Meaning, McGee addressed a crisis in the fields of ethics and theory of knowledge. In a passage typical of his humanist ethics, he wrote:

If personal morality had a compelling rational basis, the moralist could rest his case on rational demonstration and deduce the certain canons of moral rationality. In fact no ultimately rational ground is available, and to insist on its necessity is one road to moral disaster. Not rationality but reasonableness is what we can reasonably hope. (1966:7-8)

=== Essays ===
- "Letters to the Editor: Academic Freedom" in Life (1953)
- "Controversy: Replies to Bettelheim's 'Schooling is Not Enough'" in New York Review of Books (1964)
- "Who Means What by 'Synonymy'?" in Inquiry : An Interdisciplinary Journal of Philosophy (1959)
- "A simple sketch of language" in Journal of Philosophy (1960)
- "Pre-Ceremonial Relations" in The Philosophical Quarterly (1963)
- "Fun, games and natural language" in Australasian Journal of Philosophy (1964)
- "A Modest Proposal" in Chicago Review (1964)
- "A Dispositional Interpretation of Criteria in Mind" in The Philosophy of C.I. Lewis (1968)

=== Books ===
- The Recovery of Meaning: An Essay on the Good Life (Random House, New York, 1966)

== External sources ==
- Bowdoin College Photo of C. Douglas McGee (undated)
