= Krejčí =

Krejčí (feminine: Krejčová or Krejčí) (Note: Krejčí, just like other Czech surnames ending with -í, is an uncommon example of a Czech surname that allows the same form for both masculine and feminine genders. However, Krejčová is more common. The inflected form Krejčová is also associated with the surname Krejča, which is however significantly less common in the population.) is a Czech surname. In modern Czech, it means 'tailor', but originally it was a designation for a cloth merchant (from krájet = 'to cut [cloth]'). A diminutive form of the surname is Krejčík. Notable people with the surname include:

- Cyril Krejčí (born 1957), Czech volleyball player
- Daniel Krejčí (born 1992), Czech ice hockey player
- David Krejčí (born 1986), Czech ice hockey player
- Eva Krejčová (born 1976), Czech tennis player
- Iša Krejčí (1904–1968), Czech Neoclassicist composer, conductor and dramaturg
- Jan Krejčí (1825–1887), Czech educator, geologist, journalist and politician
- Jan Krejčí (chess player) (born 1992), Czech chess grandmaster
- Jaroslav Krejčí (1892–1956), Czech lawyer and politician
- Jaroslav Krejčí (sociologist) (1916–2014), Czech-British sociologist
- Jiří Krejčí (born 1986), Czech footballer
- Josef Krejci (1911–?), Austrian field handball player
- Karel Krejčí (born 1968), Czech footballer and manager
- Ladislav Krejčí (born 1992), Czech footballer
- Ladislav Krejčí (born 1999), Czech footballer
- Ludvík Krejčí (1890–1972), Czech general
- Lukáš Krejčí (born 1969), Slovak biathlete
- Lumír Krejčí (born 1972), Czech biochemist
- Marek Krejčí (1980–2007), Slovak footballer
- Oskar Krejčí (born 1948), Czech political scientist
- Richard Krejčí (born 1970), Czech rower
- Rudolph Krejci (1929–2018), Czech-American philosopher
- Vít Krejčí (born 2000), Czech basketball player

== See also ==
- 29473 Krejčí, a main belt asteroid
- Krejci Dump, a now defunct dump in Ohio
