= Krejčík =

Krejčík (feminine: Krejčíková) is a Czech surname. It is a diminutive of the surname Krejčí and the word krejčí. In modern Czech, krejčí means 'tailor', but originally it was a designation for a cloth merchant (from krájet = 'to cut [cloth]'). Notable people with the surname include:

- Aneta Krejčíková (born 1991), Czech actress
- Barbora Krejčíková (born 1995), Czech tennis player
- Jiří Krejčík (1918–2013), Czech film director
- Jakub Krejčík (born 1991), Czech ice hockey player
- Josef Krejcik (1885–1957), Austrian chess master and writer
- Lukáš Krejčík (born 1990), Czech ice hockey player
- Stanislav Krejčík (born 1972), Czech footballer
