= Werner Leinfellner =

Austrian philosopher of science

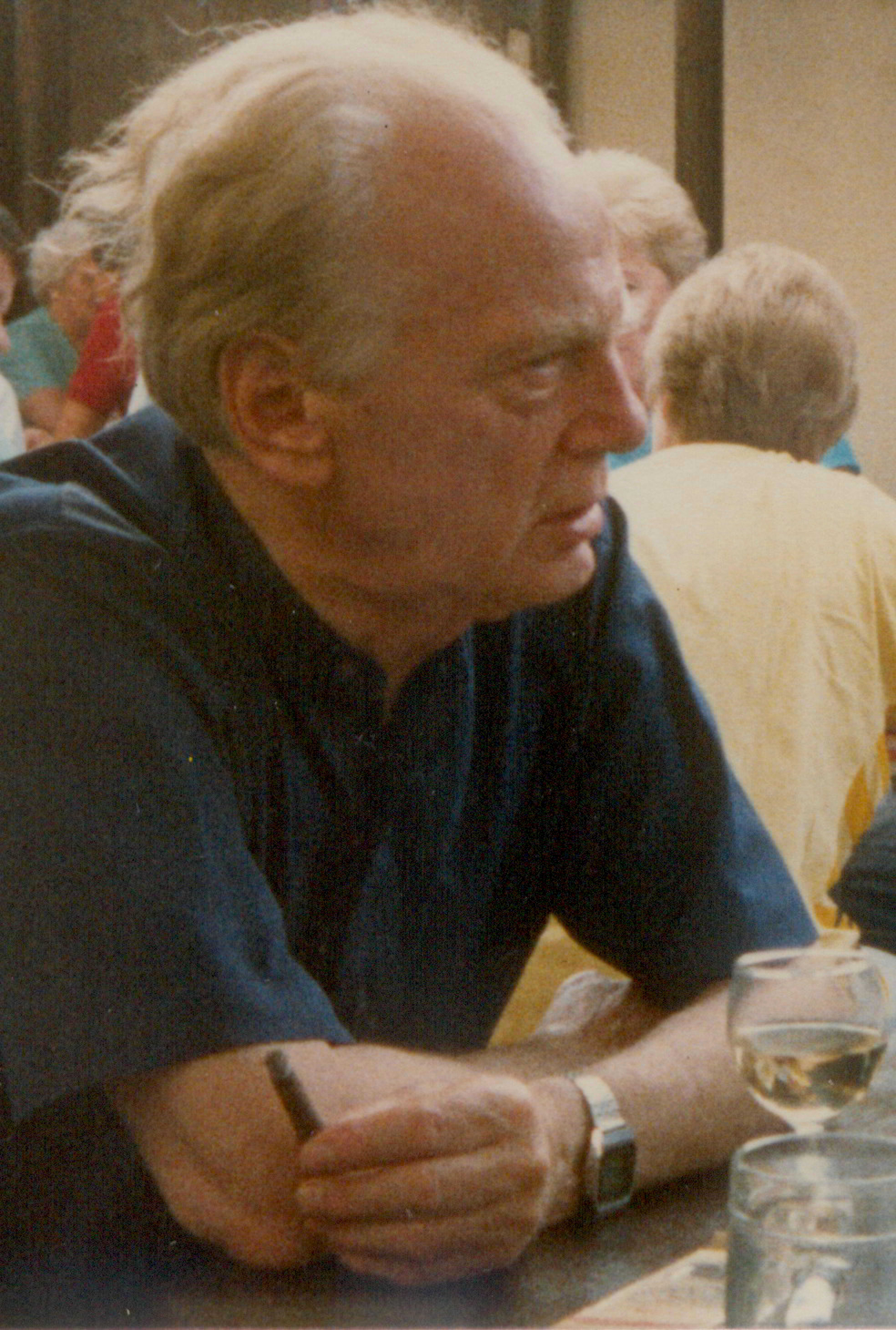
- Born: Werner Leinfellner; 27 January 1921; Graz, Austria
- Died: 6 April 2010 (aged 89); Vienna, Austria
- Education: University of Vienna
- Known for: Philosophy of Science; Philosophy of Social Science; Game theory
- Awards: Member of the European Academy of Sciences and Arts; Grand Honorary Cross for Science and Art, 1st Class
- Scientific career
- Fields: Philosophy; Philosophy of Science
- Workplaces: University of Nebraska–Lincoln; Technical University of Vienna

Werner Leinfellner (27 January 1921 – 6 April 2010) was professor of philosophy at the University of Nebraska–Lincoln and at the Vienna University of Technology. After recovering from life-threatening wounds during World War II, he studied chemistry and physics at the Universities of Vienna and Graz, eventually turning to the study of the philosophy of science, and receiving his Ph.D. in 1959. He moved to the United States in 1967, in part, because of problems faced by empirically oriented philosophers in obtaining academic positions in Austria and Germany. He is notable for his contributions to philosophy of science, as a member of European Academy of Sciences and Arts, for founding the journal Theory and Decision, for co-founding Theory and Decision Library, and for co-founding the Austrian Ludwig Wittgenstein Society and International Wittgenstein Symposium.

== Biography ==
=== Intellectual ===
Werner Leinfellner was a pioneer of scientific philosophy, game and decision theory in the tradition of the Vienna Circle. From 1945 to 1950, he studied chemistry and physics at the University of Graz and the University of Vienna and during this time he did research in chemistry. In 1954, he turned to the study of philosophy, logic and the philosophy of science and received his Ph.D. in 1959 for his dissertation Anschauung, Abstraktion und Integration im modernen physikalischen Denken (Intuition, abstraction and integration in modern physical thought) from the University of Vienna. From 1960 to 1963, he worked as a research assistant at LMU Munich in philosophy of science and logic. In 1963, he moved back to Vienna and was a research fellow and assistant professor at the Institute of Advanced Studies in philosophy of science, economics, social and political sciences, and game and decision theory. During this time, he was also a lecturer at the University of Vienna. In 1967, due to an unfavorable political and scientific climate in post-war Austria, he was unable to obtain a tenured faculty position in Austria and so he moved to Lincoln, Nebraska, and joined the department of philosophy at the University of Nebraska–Lincoln as a full professor.

In 1970, he founded the journal Theory and Decision, an international journal for philosophy and methodology of the social sciences. The founding of the journal was, in part, a reaction to the dogmatic, subjective, and metaphysical approaches he had encountered in Europe prior to coming to the United States. His vision was that Theory and Decision would help found a philosophy of the social science based on three premises:

(1) it would help in the formation of categories based on logic and mathematics for the social sciences;
(2) it would promote the development of mathematical theories and research methods for the social sciences; and
(3) it would promote the integration of theories and formal methods across the social sciences.

In 1974, he cofounded Theory and Decision Library also based on these three principles. Indeed, Eberlein and Berghel (1988) concluded:

It was essentially Werner Leinfellner's accomplishment that the ideal of logical empiricism in the 1930s and 1940s, to create a "unified science", was replaced by that of a "methodological unity of science". Accordingly,... the THEORY AND DECISION school of the philosophy of the social science can substantiate his claim: "... There are no longer any methodological differences at issue". Certainly the term "methodological" has to be interpreted in a broad sense, implicating the unity of science due to common standards of theory formation and to the fact that theories are the methodological basic units of the social science disciplines. Furthermore, "methodological unity", in the context of this journal and library, refers to the continuously differentiated and integrated unity of an undogmatic, pluralistic philosophy of the social sciences (page xii).

In 1976, Werner Leinfellner together with his wife Elisabeth Leinfellner cofounded the Austrian Wittgenstein Society and the International Wittgenstein Symposium in Kirchberg am Wechsel.

In 1986, he became professor emeritus at the University of Nebraska–Lincoln and returned to Vienna Austria as professor at the Vienna University of Technology.

In 1991, he became a member of the Science Board at the Institute Vienna Circle. Its goal is to document the continued development of the Vienna Circle's work in science and the continued application of logical-empirical thought to the philosophy of science and thereby it continues Leinfellner's goal of breaking away from irrational, dogmatic, fundamentalist though.

During his career, he received several awards and prizes including Theodor Körner Prize (twice), the Medal of the College de France, Paris, the Grand Honorary Cross for Science and Art, 1st Class, Austria, and membership in the European Academy of Sciences and Arts.

=== Personal ===
During World War II, he was required to serve in the German army and was subsequently seriously wounded on the Russian front. After a year of recovering from his wounds he deserted the German army and joined the resistance at the end of the war In 1960, he married Elisabeth Leinfellner and they had one daughter Ruth. He died in a Vienna hospital on 6 April 2010, his wife Elisabeth having preceded him in death three months earlier, on 4 January 2010.

== Philosophical and scientific views ==
=== Philosophy of science ===
For Leinfellner, science and philosophy are complementary in that they are both required for knowledge and discovery. Science has revealed a whole new way of viewing nature and society than existed prior to the 20th century. In the past, according to Leinfellner, physical and chemical processes were thought to follow deterministic laws of nature, but this view fell through as the sciences became theoretically more rigorous. In the social and economic sciences, he argued that we have to drop the notion of deterministic laws and search for rules instead. These rules, to varying degrees, involve randomness. Indeed, there are likely an enormous number of social rules all subject to randomness that would appear to result in chaos, but more likely these—rules discovered by the social and economic sciences—produce systems that are more or less stable but subject to chaotic breakdowns now and then. For Leinfellner, this probabilistic aspect of rules and laws extends to the universe.

=== Cultural evolution of social and political systems ===
Leinfellner long viewed game and decision theory as theoretical and methodological frameworks within which the social sciences could be integrated. This was the major motivation for the founding of the journal Theory and Decision and for confounding Theory and Decision Library. Later, Leinfellner would come to view evolutionary game theory as a theoretical framework for integrating biological and cultural evolution. Once placed in an evolutionary game-theoretic framework, it is possible to explain how societal cooperation evolves even though selfishness is favored at the individual level

He viewed evolution as always at work but always producing surprises. He recognized that we can partially influence evolutionary processes themselves, both biological and cultural evolution. This, however, creates an unimaginable responsibility for society especially when compared to the pre-20th-century view of humans as passive-spectators in world-as-machine view, ultimately unable to influence what we do. He viewed the evolution of society and the ability of humans to influence evolutionary processes as having enormous ethical implications, which we must deal with. The ethical implications, in part, arise because we cannot ultimately know the consequences of our influences on biological and cultural evolution.

In his view, biological and cultural evolutionary processes have implications that go beyond individual humans. At a political level, authoritarian planned economies that don't consider the randomness inherent in evolutionary processes are doomed, sooner or later, to failure. The fact that we are active participants in our own biological and cultural evolution means that we can intervene with science and technology to influence our future societal evolution—with considerable uncertainty as to the outcomes—but this also creates fundamental philosophical and ethical problems.

From a cognitive point of view, the rules by which we interact socially are the result of both biological and cultural evolution according to Leinfellner. For example, in his view, one doesn't need to necessarily learn to be a father when you see your child for the first time. There are basic "rules of fatherhood" that are instinctual. As he said: "At least this is how it was at the birth of my daughter". Nevertheless, to learn how to be a father also requires rules obtained by social and cultural learning. These rules, however, can malfunction for a variety of reasons including the fact that we have free will.

== Selected publications ==
- Werner Leinfellner (1962) Komplementaritätslogik und die Struktur physikalischer Theorien (The logic of complementarity and structure of physical theories). Wissenschaft und Welbild, 15, 277–304.
- Werner Leinfellner (1964) Die Konzeption der Analytizität in wissenschaftlichen Theorien (The concept of analyticity in scientific theories). Philosophie Naturalist, 8, 397–418.
- Werner Leinfellner (1965) Struktur und Aufbau wissenschaftlicher Theorien : eine wissenschaftstheoretisch - philosophische Untersuchung (The structure and form of scientific theories: a theory of science - philosophical inquiry). Wien-Würzburg: Physika Verlag.
- Werner Leinfellner (1965) Einführung in die Erkenntnis- und Wissenschaftstheorie. (Introduction to the theory of knowledge and scientific theories) (B. E. Hochschultaschenbücher Vol. 41/41a). Mannheim: Bibliographisches Institut (first edition).
- Werner Leinfellner (1966) Die Entstehung der Theorie: eine Analyse des kritischen Denkens in der Antike. (The beginning of theory: an analysis of critical thinking in history) Freiburg-München: Alber.
- Werner Leinfellner (1968) Generalization of classical decision theory. Risk and Uncertainty, ed. K. Borch and J. Mossin. London-New Your: Macmillan, 196–218.
- Werner Leinfellner (1973) Historical time and a new conception of the historical science. The methodological unity of science, ed. M. Bunge. Dordrecht: Reidel, 193–219.
- Werner Leinfellner (1974) Forschunglogic der Sozialwissenschaften. (The logic of research in the social sciences) (edited with W. Kroeber-Riel and G. Eberlein). Gütersloh: Bertelsmann Universitätsverlag.
- Werner and Elisabeth Leinfellner (1978). Ontologie Systemtheorie und Semantik. (Ontology system theory and semantics) Berlin: Duncker and Humblot.
- Werner Leinfellner (1979) Logik und Semantik socialwissenschaftlicher Theorien. (Logic and semantics of theories in the social sciences.) Logik und Wirtschaftswissenschaft, ed. R. Kamitz. Berlin: Duncker und humblot, 163–184.
- Werner Leinfellner (1980) Spieltheorie. Handbuck wissenschaftstheoretischer Begriffe. (Handbook of epistemological terms.) Vol. 3 ed J. Speck Göttingen: Vandenhoeck and Ruprecht, 597–599.
- Werner Leinfellner (1982) Is Wittgenstein a transcendental philosopher? Revista Portuguesa de Filosofia, 38, 13–27.
- Werner Leinfellner (1983) Evolution of intelligence Epistemology and Philosophy of Science, ed. P Weingartner and J. Czermak. Vienna: Hölder-Pichler-Tempsky and Dordrecht-Boston: Reidel, 161–168.
- Werner Leinfellner (1983) Foundations of the theory of evolution: four models of evolution. Abstracts of the Seventh International Congress of Logic, Methodology, and Philosophy of Science, Vol. 4 ed P Weingartner, Salzburg, 302–307.
- Werner Leinfellner (1984) Evolutionary causality, theory of games, and evolution of intelligence. Concepts and approaches in evolutionary epistemology, ed. F. Wuketits. Dordrecht-Boston: Reidel, 233–276.
- Werner Leinfellner (1985) Intentionality representation, and the brain language. Philosophy of Mind – Philosophy of Psychology, ed. R Chiholm et al. Vienna: Hölder-Pichler-Tempsky and Dordrecht-Boston: Reidel, 44–55.
- Werner Leinfellner (1986) The Prisoner's dilemma and its evolutionary iteration. Paradoxical effects of social behavior: Essays in honor of Anatol Rapoport, ed. A. Diekmann and P. Mitter. Heidelberg, Physika: 135–149.
- Werner Leinfellner (1986) A reconstruction of Schlick's psycho-sociological ethics. Synthese, 64, 317–349.
- Werner Leinfellner (1995) The new theory of evolution – a theory of democratic societies. in Götschl, Johann (Hrsg.) Revolutionary Changes in Understanding Man and Society, Dordrecht: Kluwer Academic Publishers (S. 1149–189).
- Werner Leinfellner (1998) Game theory, sociodynamics, and cultural evolution. Game theory, experience, rationality. ed. W. Leinfellner and Eckehart Köhler, Dordrecht: Kluwer Academic Publishers.
- Werner Leinfellner (2000) The role of creativity and randomizers in societal human conflict and problem solving. La Nuova Critica, 36, 5–27.

== Publications in honor of Werner Leinfellner ==
The publications listed here contain biographical information about Werner Leinfellner in addition to papers about his work and in honor of his work.

- Gerald L. Eberlein and H. A. Berghel (1988) Theory and Decision: Essays in Honor of Werner Leinfellner. Springer, pp. 322.
- Arturo Carsetti (editor, 2001) Saggi di scienza ed espistemologia dedicati a Werner Leinfellner (Essays dedicated to the science and epistemology of Werner Leinfellner), La Nuova Critica, 37–38, pp. 159.
- Sascha Windholz and Walter Feigl (Hrsg.) (2011). Wissenschaftstheorie, Sprachkritik und Wittgenstein: In memoriam Elisabeth und Werner Leinfellner (Philosophy of science, linguistic criticism and Wittgenstein: In memoriam of Elisabeth and Werner Leinfellner). Germany: ontos verlag, pp. 273.
