= Auguste Hauschner =

German writer

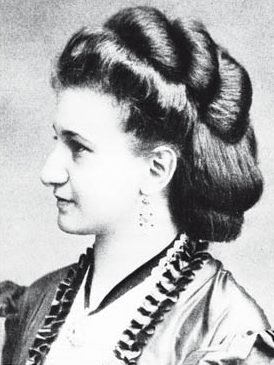
- Auguste Hauschner in 1924
- Born: Auguste Sobotka; 12 February 1850; Prague, Kingdom of Bohemia, Austrian Empire
- Died: 24 April 1924 (aged 74); Berlin, Weimar Germany
- Occupation: Writer
- Spouse: Benno Hauschner (m. 1871)
- Relatives: Fritz Mauthner (cousin)

Auguste Hauschner (née Sobotka; February 12, 1850 — April 10, 1924) was a German writer. She also published under the pseudonym of Auguste Montag. She is considered as an important representative of German-speaking authors in Prague. In her work, she repeatedly pointed out socially critical issues.

== Life ==
Auguste Sobotka was born on February 12, 1850, in Prague, Bohemia, Austria and grew up there. She was the daughter of a merchant with Jewish roots. At the age of 14, Sobotka moved to Berlin, Prussia, Germany, and attended the Jesenius boarding school for four years. In 1871, she returned to Prague and married painter and manufacturer Benno Hauschner. In the mid-1870s, she moved back to Berlin with her husband. Benno Hauschner died in 1890. Their apartment in the Tiergarten district developed in the following years into a salon for Berlin artists. In addition to her cousin Fritz Mauthner, with whom she was in close correspondence, Gustav Landauer, Maximilian Harden, Max Liebermann and Max Brod also frequented her Berlin salon.

Auguste Hauschner began her literary work in the 1880s. She penned numerous short stories and novels in which she was one of the first women writers to deal with the questions of the social position of women, and deal with questions of Jewish identity. Her most important work is the novel Die Familie Lowositz (1908, two volumes), which was followed by Rudolf and Camilla in 1910. In it she draws an (autobiographical) study of the milieu of the German-Jewish upper middle class in Prague and Berlin. She also was a promoter of socialist, anarchist and feminist actors and projects.

== Works ==
Auguste Hauschner has produced a total of 35 works in 110 publications and has 323 library holdings. Here are some widely held works by Auguste Hauschner:

- Daatjes Hochzeit; Novelle, 1902
- Kunst : Roman, 1904
- Zwischen den Zeiten, 1906
- Zwischen den Zeiten, 1906
- Die Familie Lowositz, 1908
- Die große Pantomime Roman, 1913
- Der Tod des Löwen, 1916
- Die Siedelung : Roman, 1918
- Der Versöhnungstag Novelle, 1919
- Nachtgespräche, 1919
- Die Heilung, 1921
- Die Heilung Roman, 1922

== Sources ==
- "Auguste Hauschner". In: Österreichisches Biographisches Lexikon 1815–1950 (ÖBL). Vol. 2, Austrian Academy of Sciences, Vienna 1959, p. 216 f. (Direct links to "p. 216", "p. 217")
- Hella-Sabrina Lange: "We are all standing between two times". On the work of the writer Auguste Hauschner (1850–1924). Essen: Klartext 2006. (= Düsseldorfer Schriften zur Literatur- und Kulturwissenschaft. 1.) ISBN 3-89861-583-9. Inhaltsangabe der DNB
- Andreas B. Kilcher (Hrsg.): Lexicon of German-Jewish Literature. Stuttgart 2000: JBMetzler / Poeschel Verlag
- Hauschner, Auguste. In: Lexikon deutsch-jüdischer Autoren. Volume 10: Güde – Hein. Edited by the Bibliographia Judaica archive. Saur, Munich 2002, ISBN 3-598-22690-X, S. 248–262.
- Veronika Jičínská: Bohemian themes with Fritz Mauthner and Auguste Hauschner . Czech Republic / Ústí nad Labem 2014, (= Acta Universitatis Purkynianae, Facultatis Philosophicae Studia Germanica, Series Monographica 3) ISBN 978-80-7414-692-3
- Birgit Seemann: “One human race above all peoples” – Auguste Hauschner, writer between Prague and Berlin. In: Renate Heuer (ed.): Hidden readings: new interpretations of Jewish-German texts from Heine to Rosenzweig; in memory of Norbert Altenhofer . Frankfurt am Main: Campus, 2003 ISBN 3-593-37377-7 S. 187–203.
- Jana Mikota: Jewish women writers – rediscovered: Auguste Hauschner . In: Medaon 3 (2009), 5 (online).
- Alexia Rosso: L’écrivaine Auguste Hauschner (1850-1924) Marginale ou marginalisée ?. In: Trajectoires 15 (2022) (https://doi.org/10.4000/trajectoires.7290)
- Alexia Rosso: "Hilf mir in meinem, nicht in deinem Sinne". Zu Auguste Hauschners poetologischer Programmatik. In: Bettina Bannasch und Markéta Balcarová (Hrsg.): "Ein irrender Mensch mit dem anderen." Zum literarischen und journalistischen Werk Auguste Hauschners (1850-1924), Wallstein, S. 225–242, 2025, ISBN 978-3-8353-5975-8.
