= Hubert Schleichert =

Austrian emeritus philosopher

- Born: 30 July 1935
- Died: 13 September 2020 (aged 85)
- Era: 20th century
- Region: Austria
- Main interests: political philosophy Chinese philosophy

Hubert Schleichert (30 July 1935 in Vienna – 13 September 2020 in Munich) was an Austrian emeritus philosopher (from Vienna).

His works have emphasized political philosophy, theory of argument and non-European philosophy, especially Chinese philosophy.

Working with Urs Egli, Schleichert contributed to erotetics (theory of questions) by assembling an annotated bibliography of works in philosophy, linguistics, automatic answering, and psychology/pedagogy.

== Bibliography ==
- Die erkenntnislogischen Grundlagen der klassischen Physik (1963, with Bela Juhos) ISBN 3-428-00737-9
- Elemente der physikalischen Semantik (1966)
- Klassische Chinesische Philosophie. Eine Einführung (1990) ISBN 3-406-51124-4
- Der Begriff des Bewußsteins. Eine Bedeutungsanalyse (1992) ISBN 3-465-02551-2
- Wie man mit Fundamentalisten diskutiert, ohne den Verstand zu verlieren (1997) ISBN 3-465-02259-9
- Logik und Denken (1998) ISBN 3-87940-005-9
- Von Platon bis Wittgenstein. Ein philosophisches Lesebuch (1998) ISBN 3-406-42145-8
- Fritz Mauthner. Das Werk eines kritischen Denkers (1999, with Elisabeth Leinfellner) ISBN 3-205-98433-1
