= Austrian Ludwig Wittgenstein Society =

- Abbreviation: ALWS
- Formation: 1974 or 1984 (Note: 1974 is stated as the founding year by the organization in their own publications, as part of the proceedings for the 40th International Wittgenstein Symposium. 1984 is stated as the founding year by the University of Graz Institute of Philosophy on their website.)
- Purpose: Research and Education
- Location: Kirchberg am Wechsel
- Coordinates: 47°37′N 16°0′E
- Members: Open to scholars and students
- Official language: German and English
- General Secretary: Dr. David Wagner
- President: Professor Christian Kanzian
- Affiliations: Institute Vienna Circle; Die Internationale Ludwig Wittgenstein Gesellschaft; Österreichische Gesellschaft für Philosophie

The Austrian Ludwig Wittgenstein Society was first established in 1974 or 1984 to promote philosophical conferences, workshops, summer schools, and research that are inspired by the work of Ludwig Wittgenstein and the Vienna Circle. It is an international society, which also has a publication series.

== History ==
The society was founded in 1974 or 1984 by Elisabeth Leinfellner, Werner Leinfellner, Rudolf Haller, Paul Weingartner, and Adolf Hübner. The impetus of the first International Wittgenstein Symposium in Kirchberg am Wechsel, Lower Austria, led to its development as an international society. The location of the society is in Kirchberg am Wechsel; the location was selected because Ludwig Wittgenstein taught at elementary schools close to Kirchberg am Wechsel in the 1920s.

== Goals ==
The society has stated its goals to promote the analysis, tradition, and dissemination of Wittgenstein's philosophy, and to promote philosophy that has its roots in Austria and other countries with emphasis on analytic philosophy inspired by Wittgenstein, and philosophy of science inspired by, but not limited to, the philosophy of the Vienna Circle.

== Membership ==
The society currently reports 210 members both national and international. Membership is decided by the Executive Committee of the society based on academic criteria.

== Publications ==
The society has published its proceedings since the first International Wittgenstein Symposium. In 2006, they started a new series, published by Ontos Verlag. The new series contains the official proceedings of the International Wittgenstein Symposium, special workshops, and high-quality publications submitted to and reviewed by the society.

== International Ludwig Wittgenstein Institute (ILWI) ==
The ILWI was recently founded by the society, and supports scientific and cultural projects that are related to Wittgenstein's philosophy and the goals of the society. The ILWI presents workshops, summer schools, Wittgenstein lectures, and research opportunities at the ILWI.

== Sponsorship ==
The society is funded by the government of Lower Austria, the Austrian Federal Ministry for Science and Research, Raiffeisenbank NÖ-Süd Alpin, Kirchberg am Wechsel, membership fees, and donations. The Wiener Zeitung newspaper is the current media collaborator for the society.

== See also ==
- Ludwig Wittgenstein
- International Wittgenstein Symposium
- Haus Wittgenstein
- Tractatus Logico-Philosophicus
- Philosophical Investigations
- On Certainty
