= Béla Juhos =

Hungarian-Austrian philosopher

Béla Juhos (22 November 1901, Vienna – 27 May 1971, Vienna) was a Hungarian-Austrian philosopher and member of the Vienna Circle.

== Life ==
Juhos was born on 22 November 1901 in Vienna into a Hungarian family of low nobility (Hungarian citizenship until 1945). His father was a Hungarian tradesman and entrepreneur owning an iron wholesale in Vienna and Budapest. Juhos attended primary school in Budapest and spoke Hungarian as a child. In 1909 he moved to Vienna, where he learned German and completed Realgymnasium in 1920.

Juhos studied mathematics, physics and philosophy at the University of Vienna. In 1926 he completed his studies with a dissertation under Moritz Schlick with the title "To What Extent did Schopenhauer Do Justice to Kantian Ethics?" ("Inwieweit ist Schopenhauer der Kant’schen Ethik gerecht geworden?"). From the beginning of the Schlick Circle in 1924 until its dissolution in 1936 (after the murder of Schlick) Juhos participated in the meetings of the Vienna Circle.

Due to his economic independence Juhos could stay in Vienna as a private scholar during the Second World War – except for the period of his military service in 1942–1944.

Together with Victor Kraft Juhos was the only member of the Vienna Circle to remain in Vienna during the Second World War and to continue to work at the University of Vienna after the war. In 1948 he submitted his Habilitation thesis (venia legendi) with the title "Cognition and its Achievements" ("Die Erkenntnis und ihre Leistung") under Victor Kraft and became Privatdozent (private lecturer). In 1955, Juhos was appointed associate professor, but he did not obtain a permanent position at the Faculty of Philosophy. For this reason, his influence in research and teaching remained limited.

Juhos died on 27 May 1971 in Vienna.

== Works (selection) ==
- Inwieweit ist Schopenhauer der Kantischen Ethik gerecht geworden? Phil.Diss. Vienna 1926.
- Über die Grundlagen der Gewißheit des reinen Denkens, Vienna 1928.
- Erkenntnisformen in Natur- und Geisteswissenschaften, Leipzig: Pan Verlag 1940.
- "Empirische Sätze und logische Konstanten", in: The Journal of Unified Science 8/5-6, 1940, 354-360.
- Die Erkenntnis und ihre Leistung, Vienna: Springer 1950.
- Elemente der neuen Logik, Frankfurt-Vienna 1954.
- Das Wertgeschehen und seine Erfassung, Meisenheim am Glan: Verlag Anton Hain 1956.
- Die erkenntnislogische Grundlagen der klassischen Physik (together with Hubert Schleichert), Berlin: Duncker & Humblot 1963.
- Die erkenntnislogischen Grundlagen der modernen Physik, Berlin: Duncker&Humblot 1967.
- Wahrscheinlichkeit als Erkenntnisform (together with Wolfgang Katzenberger), Berlin: Duncker & Humblot 1970.
- "Drei Quellen der Erkenntnis", in: Zeitschrift für philosophische Forschung 26/3, 1970, 335-347.
- "Geometrie und Wahrscheinlichkeit", in: Zeitschrift für philosophische Forschung 25/4, 1971, 500-510.
- "Formen des Positivismus", in: Journal for General Philosophy of Science 2/1, 1971, 27-62.
- Selected Papers on Epistemology and Physics, ed. with an introductory essay by Gerhard Frey, Dordrecht-Boston: Reidel 1976. (Contains a complete bibliography of Juhos‘ works.)

== Bibliography ==
- Stadler, Friedrich. The Vienna Circle. Studies in the Origins, Development, and Influence of Logical Empiricism. New York: Springer, 2001. – 2nd Edition: Dordrecht: Springer, 2015. – Biobibliographical presentation of Juhos: 655-660.
- Kraft, Victor, "Nachruf auf Béla Juhos", in: Zeitschrift für allgemeine Wissenschaftstheorie I/2, 1971, 163-173 (including bibliography, 314 bis 316 and 338-339). (German)
- Schleichert, Hubert, "Denker ohne Wirkung. Béla Juhos – ein typisches Schicksal", in: Conceptus 1971, 5-12. (German)
- Reiter, Wolfgang, "Wer war Bela Juhos? Eine biographische Annäherung", in: Maté, András; Rédei, Miklós; Stadler, Friedrich (eds.) The Vienna Circle in Hungary, Vienna/Berlin: Springer 2011, 65-98. (German)
