= Fritz Mauthner =

Austrian philosopher and author of novels, satires (1849–1923)

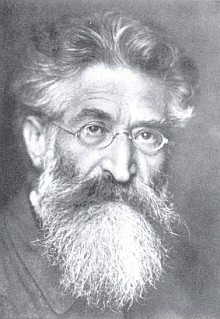
- Born: 22 November 1849; Hořice, Bohemia, Austrian Empire
- Died: 29 June 1923 (aged 73); Meersburg, Weimar Germany

Education
- Education: Charles University in Prague

Philosophical work
- Era: Contemporary philosophy
- Region: Western philosophy
- School: Empiricism; Skepticism
- Main interests: Philosophy of language Epistemology
- Notable ideas: Critique of language
- Relatives: Auguste Hauschner (cousin)

Fritz Mauthner (German: [ˈmaʊtnɐ]; 22 November 1849 – 29 June 1923) was an Austrian philosopher and author of novels, satires, reviews and journalistic works. He was an exponent of philosophical scepticism derived from a critique of human knowledge and of philosophy of language.

He became editor of the Berliner Tageblatt in 1895, but is remembered mainly for his Beiträge zu einer Kritik der Sprache (Contributions to a Critique of Language), published in three parts in 1901 and 1902. Ludwig Wittgenstein took several of his ideas from Mauthner, and acknowledges him in his Tractatus Logico-Philosophicus (1922).

== Life ==
=== Early life ===
Fritz Mauthner was born on 22 November 1849 into an assimilated, well-to-do Jewish family from Hořice in Bohemia (now in the Czech Republic). He was born as the fourth of six children of Emmanuel and Amalie Mauthner. The Mauthners were a wealthy Jewish family who did not practise their faith. Mauthner's grandfather was a follower of Frankism. Mauthner describes his father in the autobiography as having "literally grown up without knowledge of any catechism" and his educated mother, who took care of the children's education, as "anti-religious". Mauthner's family spoke German, unlike most of the Bohemian population. His parents were proud of the fact that they spoke German. Mauthner learned German through his family, Czech through his nursemaid and a little Hebrew through a private teacher. Philosopher Gershon Weiler suggests that "it is unlikely that he ever passed beyond the point of mastering the alphabet" in Hebrew. As a German-speaking Jew in the Bohemian region of the Austrian Empire, Mauthner belonged to a double minority and struggled to find a sense of belonging. This experience is cited in later years as formative for his intellectual development. In the autobiography, Mauthner writes "I do not understand at all if a Jew born in a Slavic region of Austria is not pushed into linguistic research."

In 1855, the five-year-old Mauthner moved to Prague with his family to be educated. Mauthner received private lessons, attended a private Jewish school (Klippschule) and later two secondary schools. In his autobiography he writes disparagingly about the low standard of the schools. He considered himself highly gifted and was resentful of the school system. His autobiography is largely a critique of the school system of the time, which was limited to corporal punishment and learning by rote.

Mauthner wanted to become a writer; his father wanted him to become a merchant. They agreed that he would study jurisprudence at Charles University in Prague. Mauthner studied jurisprudence from 1869 to 1873. At the university, Mauthner attended lectures in philosophy, music, physics, art history, medicine and theology. He read Arthur Schopenhauer and Ernst Mach, under whom he also attended lectures.

Mauthner passed the first state examination in law and worked as a theatre critic, writer and poet alongside his studies. With the death of his father in 1874, Mauthner broke off his studies. He published unsuccessful volumes of poetry, and worked as a journalist and playwright. His play Anna premiered at the Estates Theatre in 1874, but was discontinued after only a few performances. The comedy Die leidige Geldfrage (The tiresome question of money) was shown in Prague and Berlin in 1876.

=== Berlin and Freiburg im Breisgau ===
In 1876, at the age of 27, Mauthner moved to Berlin, known on the theatre scene as a critic and author. He chose Berlin and not Vienna because he was enthusiastic about Bismarck and because he did not want to be patronised by his family in Austria. In Berlin, Mauthner worked as a journalist for several newspapers and wrote literary and theatre criticism for the Berliner Tageblatt, a leading liberal daily newspaper. He published books and volumes of poetry and became a well-known cultural figure. Mauthner, together with Paul Lindau, was considered Germany's most qualified theatre critic.

In 1878 he married Jenny Ehrenberg, a pianist, and his only daughter Grete was born. In the following years, Mauthner worked as an editor, publisher, critic and writer. His novels were historical, socio-critical, German-national, satirical, and columnist. Some of his books, such as the parodies, were very successful, and were translated and published in several print runs during Mauthner's lifetime. Their literary quality is judged ambivalently: The commercially successful works consist mainly of light novels, which can be judged as being shallow. Some of Mauthner's novels, however, contain reflections that would later be considered philosophically.

1893 Mauthner began to work on the Beiträge zu einer Kritik der Sprache (Contributions to a Critique of Language). During the work, his wife Jenny died, and he suffered from an eye disease, which threatened to make him blind. He collaborated with anarchist philosopher and pacifist Gustav Landauer to finish the text. The Contributions to a Critique of Language appeared from 1901 to 1903 in the three volumes Zur Sprache und zur Psychologie (On Language and Psychology), Zur Sprachwissenschaft (On Linguistics) and Zur Logik und Grammatik (On Logic and Grammar). The work was largely rejected among academic circles, which disappointed Mauthner deeply. He suffered from depression and developed a strong dislike of the city life in Berlin and of his journalistic work, which he had always continued to do as a bread-and-butter occupation. He called journalism a "trade with words" (Worthandel) and expressed his dissatisfaction several times in letters.

In 1905, at the age of 56, Mauthner left Berlin and lived in Freiburg, where he met and married the physician and writer Hedwig (Harriet) Straub in 1907. His book on Spinoza was published in 1906, and as from 1907 he attended university lectures in mathematics and natural sciences, while devoting himself mainly to philosophy and writing. Mauthner regarded Hugo von Hofmannsthal's The Lord Chandos Letter (1906) as a work influenced by his own critique of language.

=== Meersburg ===
In 1909, Mauthner moved with his wife Hedwig to Meersburg on Lake Constance, in a well-known house called Glaserhäusle. There he wrote the monograph Die Sprache (Language) for the series Die Gesellschaft, edited by Martin Buber. Mauthner worked on the Wörterbuch der Philosophie (Dictionary of Philosophy) and Der Atheismus und seine Geschichte im Abendlande (Atheism and its History in the Occident). The Dictionary appeared in 1910 and 1911. In three volumes with about 2,000 pages in total, Mauthner exercised his critique of language, set out in the Contributions, exemplified on the central concepts of Western philosophy. His eye disease worsened during the process; he dictated the text to his wife Hedwig to write down and read out aloud. Mauthner developed a godless mysticism as a culmination of the critique of language. It is assumed that the importance of mysticism emerged from his collaboration with Hedwig Straub. In 1912, his last novel Der letzte Tod des Gautama Buddha (The Last Death of Gautama Buddha) was published.

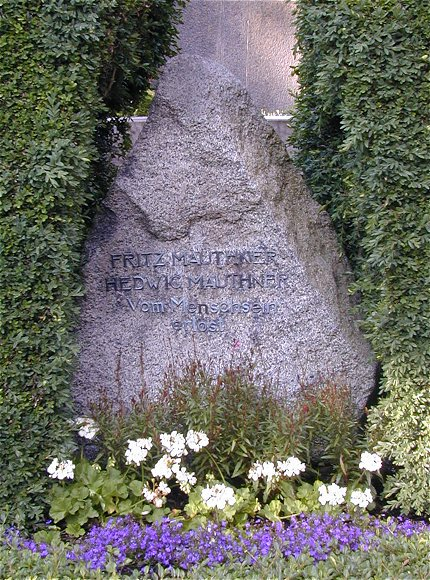
Grave of Fritz and Hedwig Mauthner (Harriet Straub) at Meersburg cemetery. Inscription: Vom Menschsein erlöst (Redeemed from being human)

During World War I, Mauthner wrote inflammatory and nationalistic newspaper articles. He reflected on the connection between philosophy and war; although he did not embrace the war, he placed the importance of Germany's military success above any philosophy. His political commitment disturbed his friends, especially Gustav Landauer.

During the last years of his life, he revised the Dictionary in parallel with his work on the history of atheism. From 1920 to 1923, Der Atheismus und seine Geschichte im Abendlande appeared in four volumes.

Mauthner died at age 74 on 29 June 1923. Hedwig Mauthner continued to live in the Glaserhäusle after her husband's death. During the National Socialist regime, as the widow of a Jew, she was banned from publishing books in 1933 and her pension payments were stopped. She survived through the help of friends and the Meersburg town priest Wilhelm Restle, and died impoverished in 1945. Fritz and Hedwig Mauthner are buried together at Meersburg cemetery; their gravestone reads Vom Menschsein erlöst (Redeemed from being human).

== Philosophical work ==
Mauthner's philosophical work is concerned with the philosophy of language and atheism. Three books, each in several volumes, can be regarded as his main theoretical contributions: The Beiträge zu einer Kritik der Sprache (three volumes 1901–1902, third revised edition 1923), Wörterbuch der Philosophie (two volumes 1910, third revised edition in three volumes 1923–1924) and Der Athesimus und seine Geschichte im Abendlande (four volumes 1920–1923). Besides these works, Mauthner published shorter works on the philosophy of Aristotle, Spinoza and Schopenhauer, as well as on various topics related to his philosophy of language.

Mauthner's writing style is unorthodox: he draws on a variety of sources, combines his biography with theoretical considerations, he writes redundantly and, above all, comprehensively a lot (each of his three main works comprise more than 2,000 pages). Only a few of his smaller theoretical works have been translated into English (see Section "Philosophical works in English translation").

=== Critique of language ===
Mauthner advocates an empirical, sceptical nominalism, which he develops into a comprehensive and epistemological theory. He consistently pursues this approach to the conclusion that all philosophical problems are problems of language. Thus, Mauthner can be understood as a precursor of logical empiricism. Philosopher Elisabeth Leinfellner calls him a thinker in the Austrian tradition of philosophy, but also writes that he regards himself as a thinker in the succession of Hume. Weiler calls Mauthner paradigmatic for the English tradition of empiricism. Mauthner's philosophy, like logical empiricism, is characterised by an anti-metaphysical attitude and a methodical approach through linguistic analysis. At the same time, his premises are based in a different tradition and his goal is not a reform of language through its analysis, but – as a paradoxical project – the destruction of language as a tool to gain knowledge. For Mauthner, a logical analysis of language is also condemned to fail, as he regards logic as just another form of language. Mauthner's philosophy stands for the tragic admission that it is impossible to gain knowledge through the means of language.

Mauthner identifies empiricism as the school of thought that gave him the idea of the critique of language. For him, everything that is regarded knowledge can be traced back to sensory experience. The central feature for this assumption is his concept of the Zufallssinne (contingent senses): if all knowledge is traced back to sensory experience, then the sense organs are the condition for the possibility of knowledge. Animals and humans, however, have different sensory apparatuses and therefore perceive the world differently. The way humans see the world is a moment of evolutionary development. No organic condition of world perception can perceive the world as it actually is. Mauthner writes: "The words of language are ultimately unfit for penetrating into the essence of reality, because words are only memory-indices for the sensations of our senses and because these senses are contingent senses, which truly experience nothing more of reality than a spider does of the palace in whose oriel arbour it has spun its web. Thus mankind must quietly despair of ever knowing reality."

This scepticism concerns language only as an instrument of knowledge. The poetic and communicative function of language is recognised by Mauthner. Language is useful for daily life, but not for knowledge.

Belief in extra-linguistic reference is called word superstition (Wortaberglaube) or word fetish (Wortfetisch). In this context, Mauthner introduces the term Scheinbegriff (pseudo-concept), which later became one of the central concepts in the tradition of logical empiricism. The meaning attributed to the words of language is nothing other than the memory of its use. He argues that the meaning of language has to do with its use, similar to Wittgenstein. Mauthner intends to show that an abstract language consisting of grammatical rules and vocabulary is an artificial abstraction that negates psychological reality. Language is rooted in sensory experience. The deception that words refer to an extra-linguistic reality particularly affects philosophy, which he criticises as being metaphysically charged by historic traditions: "I live by the belief and the conviction that the sceptical nominalism, with which I have shown the inadequacy of human language in general, particularly affects philosophical concepts, and among them most strongly the most general concepts."

Mauthner states his philosophical programme of a critique of language in the introduction to the Dictionary as follows: "Philosophy is epistemology, epistemology is the critique of language; the critique of language, however, is the work on the liberating thought that people can never get beyond the figurative representation of the world with the words of their languages and with the words of their philosophies."

=== Legacy ===
While Mauthner's literary work can be considered forgotten, his philosophy of language resonated in the literature of the 20th century. Mauthner's influences can be found in the work of Jorge Luis Borges, Samuel Beckett and James Joyce. Today, Mauthner's philosophy is mainly addressed in relation to Wittgenstein.

Throughout his life, Mauthner himself was unhappy about the lack of response to his work. The lack of response, however, refers primarily to academic philosophy, which did not react to Mauthner. The Contributions to a Critique of Language sold well and were well reviewed in newspapers.

Mathematician Felix Hausdorff, for example, wrote a positive review and communicated his enthusiasm in letters to Mauthner. Kühn lists forty to fifty reviews from 1901 that react to the publication Mauthner's Contributions. Gustav Landauer undertakes an early examination of Mauthner's philosophy in 1902 and writes the book Skepsis und Mystik that depicts Mauthner as a mystic. Hermann Häfker and Theodor Lessing were critical of Mauthner and accused him of confusion in his philosophical foundations. The first monograph on Mauthner was published in 1926 by Theodor Kappstein, which is regarded as an uncritical praise by Kühn. With the rise of Nazism, the engagement with the Jewish thinker ends abruptly and Mauthner becomes forgotten.

It is, however, undisputed that Mauthner had been well known for his literary, journalistic and philosophical work. Two famous people in the history of philosophy bear witness to this: Karl Popper mentions in his autobiography some of the philosophy books in his father's library, and states Mauthner's Contributions as being there among the works of Descartes, Spinoza, Kant, Schopenhauer and others. The second mention, to which Mauthner credits the philosophical interest, comes from Ludwig Wittgenstein. Wittgenstein mentions Mauthner in the Tractatus, and although it is a delimiting remark, this mention can be understood as an expression of appreciation, since Wittgenstein mentions very few philosophers by name.

Mauthner's concept of word superstition is discussed in the influential book The Meaning of Meaning by C. K. Ogden and I. A. Richards. The most influential reception in the English-speaking world comes from philosopher and writer Gershon Weiler, who published the first comprehensive English-language monograph on Mauthner, along with numerous essays. An intellectual biography is available in French. A modern German edition of Mauthner's works, including the Dictionary of Philosophy and the Contributions to a Critique of Language, was edited by German philosopher and literary scholar Ludger Lütkehaus.

Mauthner's estate is preserved as the Fritz Mauthner Collection at the Center for Jewish History, Leo Baeck Institute New York.

== Works ==
=== Philosophy ===
- Beiträge zu einer Kritik der Sprache, three volumes, Stuttgart: J.G. Cotta, 1901–1903.
- Aristoteles, 1904
- Spinoza, 1906
- Die Sprache, 1907
- Wörterbuch der Philosophie, two volumes 1910–11, three volumes 1923–24
- Schopenhauer, 1911
- Der letzte Tod des Gautama Buddha, 1913
- Der Atheismus und seine Geschichte im Abendlande, four volumes 1920–23
- Muttersprache und Vaterland, 1920

=== Fiction ===
- Anna, 1874
- Lyrik
- Die große Revolution, 1872
- Nach berühmten Mustern, satirical, 1878, 1889
- Einsame Fahrten, 1879
- Vom armen Franischko, story, 1879
- Die Sonntage der Baronin, 1881
- Der neue Ahasver, 1882
- Dilettantenspiegel, satirical, 1883
- Gräfin Salamanca, 1884
- Xanthippe, 1884
- Berlin W. (trilogy of novels): Quartett, 1886; Die Fanfare, 1888; Der Villenhof, 1890
- Der letzte Deutsche von Blatna, novel, 1887
- Der Pegasus, 1889
- Zehn Geschichten, 1891
- Glück im Spiel, 1891
- Hypatia, 1892
- Lügenohr, 1892 (under the title: Aus dem Märchenbuch der Wahrheit, 1899)
- Kraft, novel 1894
- Die Geisterseher, novel 1894
- Die bunte Reihe, 1896
- Der steinerne Riese, novella, 1896
- Die böhmische Handschrift, novella 1897
- Der wilde Jockey, 1897
- Der letzte Tod des Gautama Buddha, novel 1913
- Der goldene Fiedelbogen, 1917

=== Essays and theoretical works ===
- Kleiner Krieg, 1879
- Credo, 1886
- Tote Symbole, 1892
- Zum Streit um die Bühne, 1893
- Totengespräche, 1906
- Gespräche im Himmel und andere Ketzereien, 1914

=== Translations ===
- Henriette Marechal, by Edmond de Goncourt, 1895

=== Editorial ===
- Wochenschrift für Kunst und Literatur, 1889-1890
- Magazin für die Literatur des In- und Auslandes, 1891
- Bibliothek der Philosophen, from 1911

=== Collected works ===
- Ausgewählte Schriften, 6 books, 1919

=== Miscellaneous ===
- Erinnerungen, autobiography 1918
- Selbstbiographie, 1922, in: Philosophie der Gegenwart in Selbstdarstellungen, Bd. 3.

=== Philosophical works in English translation ===
- (1907). Aristotle. Translated by Charles D. Gordon. London: William Heinemann.
- (1924). "Skepticism and the Jews". The Menorah Journal 10 (1): 1–14, translated and introduced by A.S.O.
- (2023). "Philosophy and the War". Journal of Continental Philosophy 4 (1/2): 61–70, translated and introduced by Thomas Hainscho. doi:10.5840/jcp202391350

== Notes and references ==
=== References ===
- Arens, Katherine (2001). Empire in Decline: Fritz Mauthner's Critique of Wilhelminian Germany. New York: Peter Lang. ISBN 9780820450384.
- Ben-Zvi, Linda (1980). "Samuel Beckett, Fritz Mauthner and the Limits of Language". PMLA. 95 (2): 183–200. doi:10.2307/462014. JSTOR 462014. S2CID 163721483.
- Dapía, Silvia (1993). Die Rezeption der Sprachkritik Fritz Mauthners im Werk von Jorge Luis Borges. Cologne, Weimar: Böhlau. ISBN 9783412073930.
- Häfker, Hermann; Lessing, Theodor (1902). "Kritik der Sprache. Zwei Korreferate". Die Gesellschaft. 18 (3): 407–410 (Häfker), 410–419 (Lessing).
- Henne, Helmut; Kaiser, Christine (2000). Fritz Mauthner – Sprache, Literatur, Kritik: Festakt und Symposion zu seinem 150. Geburtstag. Berlin: De Gruyter. ISBN 9783110941548.
- Iggers, Wilma (2010). "Mauthner, Fritz". The YIVO Encyclopedia of Jews in Eastern Europe.
- Janik, Allan; Toulmin, Stephen (1996). Wittgenstein's Vienna. Chicago: I.R. Dee. ISBN 1566631327.
- Kager, Maria (2018). "James Joyce and Fritz Mauthner: Multilingual Liberators of Language". The Germanic Review: Literature, Culture, Theory. 93 (1): 39–47. doi:10.1080/00168890.2018.1396082. S2CID 165484829.
- Kappstein, Theodor (1926). Fritz Mauthner: der Mann und sein Werk. Berlin: Paetel.
- Kühn, Joachim (1975). Gescheiterte Sprachkritik: Fritz Mauthners Leben und Werk. Berlin: Walter de Gruyter. ISBN 3110058332.
- Leinfellner, Elisabeth (1995). "Fritz Mauthner im historischen Kontext der empiristischen, analytischen und sprachkritischen Philosophie". In Leinfellner, Elisabeth; Schleichert, Hubert (eds.). Fritz Mauthner: Das Werk eines kritischen Denkers. Wien: Böhlau. pp. 145–163. ISBN 978-3205984337.
- Leinfellner, Elisabeth; Schleichert, Hubert (1995). "Fritz Mauthner, der schwierige Kritiker". In Leinfellner, Elisabeth; Schleichert, Hubert (eds.). Fritz Mauthner: Das Werk eines kritischen Denkers. Wien: Böhlau. pp. 7–10. ISBN 978-3205984337.
- Le Rider, Jacques (2012). Fritz Mauthner. Une biographie intellectuelle. Paris: Bartillat. ISBN 9782841005017.
- Mauthner, Fritz (1918). Erinnerungen. München: Georg Müller.
- Mauthner, Fritz (1997). Wörterbuch der Philosophie. Band 1. Wien: Böhlau. ISBN 9783205986447.
- Mauthner, Fritz (1999a). Beiträge zu einer Kritik der Sprache. Band 1: Zur Sprache und zur Psychologie. Wien: Böhlau. ISBN 9783205991076.
- Mauthner, Fritz (1999b). Beiträge zu einer Kritik der Sprache. Band 2: Zur Sprachwissenschaft. Wien: Böhlau. ISBN 9783205991076.
- Mauthner, Fritz (1999c). Beiträge zu einer Kritik der Sprache. Band 3: Zur Grammatik und Logik. Wien: Böhlau. ISBN 9783205991076.
- Mongré, Paul (1903). "Sprachkritik". Neue Deutsche Rundschau. 14: 1233–1258.
- Museumsverein Meersburg (Ed.) (2011). Meersburg unterm Hakenkreuz 1933–1945. Meersburg: Robert Gessler. ISBN 9783861361640.
- Nájera, Elena (2007). "Wittgenstein versus Mauthner: Two critiques of language, two mysticisms". In Hrachovec, Herbert; Pichler, Alois; Wang, Joseph (eds.). Papers of the 30th International Wittgenstein Symposium, 5-11 August 2007. Philosophie der Informationsgesellschaft - Philosophy of the Information Society. Kirchberg am Wechsel: Ausatrian Ludwig Wittgenstein Society. pp. 160–162.
- Popper, Karl (2002) [1976]. Unended Quest. An Intellectual Autobiography. London and New York: Routledge. ISBN 0415285909.
- Ullmann, Bettina (2000). Fritz Mauthners Kunst- und Kulturvorstellungen. Frankfurt am Main: Peter Lang. ISBN 3631357931.
- Weiler, Gershon (1970). Mauthner's Critique of Language. Cambridge: Cambridge University Press. ISBN 9780521078610.
- Wittgenstein, Ludwig (1922). Tractatus Logico-Philosophicus. London: Kegan Paul.
