= Arturo Carsetti =

Italian philosopher (1940–2024)

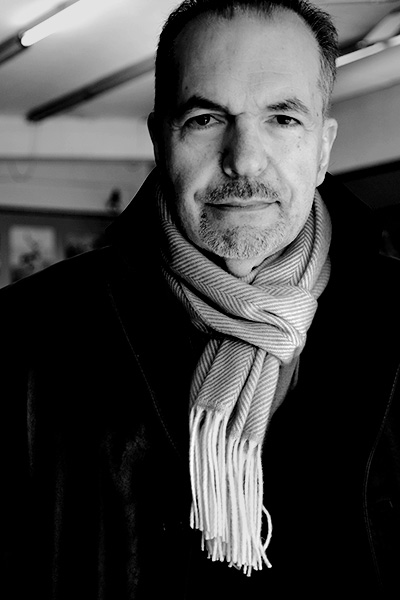
- Born: 25 April 1940; Viterbo
- Died: 9 November 2024 (aged 84); Aprilia
- Awards: Member of European Academy of Sciences and Arts

Education
- Education: Sapienza University of Rome

Philosophical work
- Region: Western philosophy
- School: Analytic; Enactive Realism
- Institutions: University of Trieste; University of Bari; University of Rome
- Main interests: Philosophy of science Epistemology; Philosophy of mind Metabiology
- Website: www.arturocarsetti.it

Arturo Carsetti (25 April 1940 – 9 November 2024) was an Italian Philosopher of sciences and Professor of philosophy of science at the University of Bari and the University of Rome Tor Vergata. He was the editor of the Italian Journal for the philosophy of science La Nuova Critica founded in 1957 by Valerio Tonini. He is notable for his contributions, also as a member of the European Academy of Sciences and Arts, to philosophy of science, epistemology, metabiology, cognitive science, semantics and philosophy of mind.

== Biography ==
Arturo Carsetti received a degree in philosophy (cum laude) from the University of Rome La Sapienza. Initially he was the principal investigator of the research program S.I.R. at the Italian National Research Council (CNR). In 1973 he was appointed assistant of psychology at the University of Rome La Sapienza. From 1975 to 1980 he taught logic at the University of Trieste and he was full Professor of philosophy of science since 1980 until 2012 at the University of Bari and University of Rome Tor Vergata. From 1992 to 1995 he was Head of the Department of Philosophy of the University of Rome Tor Vergata.

Influenced by Vittorio Somenzi, Heinz von Foerster and Henri Atlan he became interested in applying Cybernetics and Information Theory to living systems. During his stay in Trieste he worked in collaboration with Gaetano Kanizsa about the procedures of self-organization in visual cognition. In 1981 he began a working relationship with Francisco Varela and Jean Petitot and many other scholars in the field of Self-organization Theory and Complexity Theory. In particular, he investigated the link between meaning and information as outlined by Rudolf Carnap and his followers as well as the concept of "reflexive model" as introduced by Dana Scott. In the following years he also worked in collaboration with the Austrian philosopher Werner Leinfellner and he was the editor of the "Essays of Science and Epistemology Dedicated to Werner Leinfellner". He has been Visiting Professor at the École Normale Supérieure, École des Hautes Études en Sciences Sociales and Konrad Lorenz Institute of Vienna.

In the 1980s and 1990s, also as a result of a long-term collaboration with Stephen Gossberg and other scholars, he edited many volumes and special issues of La Nuova Critica devoted to Cognitive Science and Complexity Theory. He was member of the following scientific Societies: SILFS (until 2011), SFI, AST, SIBPA, CiE, IACAP and he has been the Editor-in-chief of the international journal La Nuova Critica since 1984. He was also Co-Editor of the journals: Evolution and Cognition and Zeitschrift für Wissenschaftsforschung and he was member of the advisory board of the Logic and Philosophy of Science journal. He has been the Director of the International Agreement of Scientific Collaboration stipulated by the Universities of Graz and Rome Tor Vergata. Since 1996 Carsetti was European Evaluator and in 2012 he joined the European Academy of Sciences and Arts. In the period 1981-2010 he organized 18 International Conferences, Colloquia and Workshops and participated in multiple Colloquia and Meetings in Philosophy of Sciences all over the world. From 1981 to 2005 he was member of the Scientific Committee of the University of Rome Tor Vergata. In the period 1994-1997 he was the National Coordinator of a group of research in the field of Philosophy of Science at the Ministry of Education, Universities and Research (Italy) (MIUR). During 1995 and 1997 he was the National Coordinator of a group of research in the field of Philosophy of Science at the CNR. From 2000 to 2010 he coordinated five Research Projects at MIUR, (PRIN 2000, 2002, 2004, 2006 and 2008). From 2011 to 2018 he coordinated three other Research Projects at LNC. He was the international Coordinator of the Research Project "LNC, IPR, Eigenforms, self-organizing models and morphogenesis". He investigated in particular the mathematical and epistemological aspects concerning the functional structures of (human) perception in its link with intentionality and with reference to the development of the embodiment process. Major attention was devoted to the introduction of the innovative concept of "self-organizing model" in order to explain, in mathematical terms, why at the level of life and cognition the function cannot but self-organize together with its meaning. He is the author of 5 volumes (a next volume is at press) and about 126 papers in international scientific journals. He has edited 10 volumes.

He died on 9 November 2024, after a long illness.

== Philosophical and scientific views ==
According to Carsetti's main thesis, it is necessary to take note, pace Immanuel Kant, that, at the level of a biological cognitive system, sensibility is not a simple interface between absolute chance and an invariant intellectual order. On the contrary, the reference procedures, if successful, appear able to modulate canalization at the level of embodiment process thus setting the stage for the appearance of ever-new frames of incompressibility through morphogenesis. In Carsetti's opinion, the real problem is represented not by the subject's discovery and exploration of ever new territories (according to the well known and many shared view held by the great scholar Hilary Putnam), but by his coming to offer himself as a matrix and arch in view of the autonomous release of new biological landscapes in accordance with ever increasing levels of complexity. There is no casual autonomous process already in existence, and no possible selection and synthesis activity via a possible "remnant" through reference procedures considered as a form of simple regimentation. "These procedures - he writes - are in actual fact functional to the construction and irruption of new incompressibility: meaning, as Forma formans, offers the possibility of creating a holistic anchorage, and that is exactly what allows the categorial apparatus to emerge and act according to a coherent 'arborization' ". As Carsetti maintains: "The new invention, which is born then shapes and opens the (new) eyes of the mind: I see as a mind because new meaning is able to articulate and take root through me". At the biological level, what is innate is the result of an evolutionary process and is programmed by natural selection.

Thus, natural selection, in Carsetti's opinion, appears as the coder (once linked to the emergence of meaning): at the same time at the biological level this emergence process is indissolubly correlated to the continuous construction of new formats in accordance with the unfolding of ever new mathematics, a mathematics that necessarily moulds coder's activity. Hence the necessity of articulating and inventing a mathematics capable of engraving itself in an evolutionary landscape in accordance with the opening up of meaning. In this sense, for instance, the realms of non standard-models and non-standard analysis represent, today, as Carsetti writes: "...a fruitful perspective in order to point out, in mathematical terms, some of the basic concepts concerning the articulation of an adequate intentional information theory". This individuation, on the other side, presents itself, in his view, not only as an important theoretical achievement but also as one of the essential bases of our very evolution as intelligent organisms.

With respect to this theoretical mainframe, and in accordance with Heinz von Foerster (1981) and Louis Kauffman (2003), the two scholars, that is to say, to which Carsetti makes continuous reference in his works, Carsetti assumes that the objects of our experience are the fixed points of specific operators, these operators are the structure of our perception: the single object is an eigenform. Actually, in his opinion, at the level of the observation process, a continuous interaction takes place between the individual subject and the world, an interaction that produces stabilities which therefore become objects, i.e. the objects that populate our perceptual world. In this sense, perceptual activity appears conditioned by the unfolding of the embodiment process and is linked to the cues offered by Reflexivity to meaning in action. In Carsetti's opinion, it is necessary, however, to emphasize that the classic reflexive models to the extent that they do not appear capable of creatively exploring the structures of reality are not really able to account for the creativity and continuous metamorphosis that characterize cognitive activity. They do not loosen the knot related to the intricate relationships between invariance and morphogenesis and do not arise in relation to the actual realization of a specific embodiment. Hence the importance of making reference to theoretical tools more complex and variegated as, for instance, non-standard mathematics and complexity theory, in order to provide an adequate basis for the afore mentioned exploration.

As Carsetti shows in 2012 in his volume Epistemic Complexity and Knowledge Construction, by referring to this particular and very simple theoretical "landscape", it is possible to realize that the constraints imposed by specific selective pressures (operating in ambient meaning and articulating in accordance with suitable non-standard procedures) at the level of the dynamics of an original cellular (dissipative) automaton can, actually, permit a more complex canalization of the informational fluxes at stake. In particular, they can allow the unfolding of silent potentialities, the full expression of generative principles never before revealed and, consequently, the effective expression of new autonomous processes of production of varied complexity. In this way, there is the real possibility, in his opinion, to preserve the deep insights outlined by Gregory Chaitin relative to the mathematical substratum underlying biological evolution. In particular, it will then be possible to take into account some general themes concerning, for instance, the role played, at the level of the development of living beings, by: 1) meaning in action; 2) the computational membranes; 3) those specific processes that determine that particular emergence of ever-new biological structures that distinguishes natural evolution. Hence, in his opinion, the possibility to enter, according to a more precise mathematical formalism, the mystery concerning, at the biological level, the stratified and hierarchical development of the differentiation processes.

As Carsetti remarks: "The intentionality belonging to meaning manages, through the brain’s channeling, to rise to the surface of the incarnated coder, constituting itself as membrane able to mirror in itself the coder's nesting by programs". According to Carsetti, the result is a surfacing "countenance" and an extended arborization revealing itself at surface level (in that life traverses it) as a design-web of connections unified by a living intentionality finally expressing itself as true harmony. "This harmony - he writes - is that of signs created by a "hand" which ramifies (as instantiated, for example, by Auguste Rodin in a famous sculpture) to become countenance, a hand that individuates (and perceives) itself, through the operated design, as the combined and productive features of meaning in action". At the level of the membrane (or at the level of the visual cortex, for example), a (neural) geometry of the interacting connections is created by means of a specific self-organization process: a neurogeometry that will be to weave itself on the basis of the nourishment offered by the original web of the programs. Hence the birth of an intersection between the research carried out by Carsetti and the in-depth analysis work carried out by Jean Petitot and his school, an intersection that has given rise over the years to a variety of distinct publications. In this context, the reflection-mirroring in the countenance of meaning in action serves to enact a still more profound entrenchment. The cell closes on itself to ensure stability and autonomy, but on the basis of its own growth and self-identification, result will be both selection and evolution, invention and rediscovery. According to Carsetti, at cell level the "epistemological" work and the ongoing reflection play a vital role. The cell's achieved autonomy must, then, necessarily refer to the gradual identifying of an "internal model" marking off (and scanning) within itself the process of selection taking place. It is precisely with respect to this autonomy that, according to Carsetti, it is possible to recognize the early dawn of a consciousness of itself (but mathematically implemented) on behalf of the self-organizing system. As shown by the great scholar of Complexity Theory Gregory Chaitin to which Carsetti makes constant reference, Metabiology cannot avoid dealing with a renewed critical assessment of this mysterious but intrinsically biological phenomenon, a phenomenon that is central to the interests of Carsetti also in the field of Philosophy of Mind.

In his latest volume entitled Metabiology published in 2020, Carsetti revisits a fundamental thesis enunciated by Henri Atlan which states that, on a biological level, "the function self-organizes together with its meaning" and connects this thesis which constitutes one of the cornerstones of the contemporary theory of self-organization, with Monod's intuition according to which Nature really appears as a tinkerer characterized by the presence of precise principles of self-organization. According to Carsetti, while, however, Monod had at his disposal as a general reference framework exclusively a syntactic information theory such as that developed by Shannon (a theory framed furthermore in a first-order Cybernetics), the presence, today, of innovative analysis tools such as those represented by the definition of a second order Cybernetics as well as by the development of a new type of relationship between information and meaning, offers the possibility for the leavening of that conceptual revolution increasingly referred to as metabiology. It is exactly in this context, that Carsetti places his proposal for the very definition of a new kind of scientific Realism, i.e. the enactive (or participatory) Realism.

== Selected publications ==
- Arturo Carsetti (1976) Logica, Linguaggio, Semantica. Palermo: Palumbo. [ISBN unspecified]
- Arturo Carsetti (1982) Semantica denotazionale e sistemi autopoietici. La Nuova Critica, LXIV: 51–91.
- Arturo Carsetti (1984) Linguaggi della percezione e strutture della conoscenza scientifica. Roma: U.P. [ISBN unspecified]
- Arturo Carsetti (1986) Natural Intelligence and Artificial Intelligence, in Brookes B.C. (ed.), Intelligent Information Systems for the Information Society, Dordrecht, Reidel, 233–239.
- Arturo Carsetti (1987) Teoria algoritmica della informazione e sistemi biologici. La Nuova Critica, 3–4, 37–66.
- Arturo Carsetti et al. (1991) Semantica, Complessità e Linguaggio Naturale. Bologna: CLUEB. [ISBN unspecified]
- Arturo Carsetti (1990) Algorithmes, complexité et modèles. La Nuova Critica, 15–16, 71-100.
- Arturo Carsetti (1992) Creative processes and simulation models. Zeitschrift für Wissenschaftsforschung, 75–85.
- Arturo Carsetti (1995) The role of simulation models in the cognitive sciences in J. Goetschl (ed.), Revolutionary Changes in Understanding Man and Society, Dordrecht, 83–91.
- Arturo Carsetti (ed.) (1999) Functional Models of Cognition, Dordrecht, Kluwer. ISBN 0-7923-6072-9
- Arturo Carsetti (2000) Randomness, Information and Meaningful Complexity: Some Remarks About the Emergence of Biological Structures. La Nuova Critica, 36: 47-128.
- Arturo Carsetti (2003) Rational perception and self-organisation of forms. Axiomathes, 13, 459–470.
- Arturo Carsetti (ed. 2004) Seeing, Thinking and Knowing. Meaning and Self-Organisation in Visual Cognition and Thought. Dordrecht, Kluwer. ISBN 1-4020-2080-5
- Arturo Carsetti (ed. 2004) Conceptual Invariants, Scientific Languages and Knowledge Construction, Rome, 2004. ISBN 88-88509-03-8
- Arturo Carsetti (2006) The Role of Simulation Models in Visual Cognition. In Magnani L. (ed.), Model-Based Reasoning in Science and Engineering, London, College, 141–151.
- Arturo Carsetti (2006) Functional realism, non-standard semantics and the genesis of the mind's eyes. La Nuova Critica, 47–48, 171–197.
- Arturo Carsetti (2007) Truth, Causality and Categorial Intuition. Rome, U.P. ISBN 88-88509-05-4
- Arturo Carsetti (2007) Natural language, categorization processes and the self-organizing cognitive code, La Nuova Critica, 49-50: 181–215.
- Arturo Carsetti (2008) Complexité épistémique et structures de la connaissance. La Nuova Critica, 51–52, 103–122.
- Arturo Carsetti (ed.) (2009) Causality, Meaningful Complexity and Embodied Cognition. Berlin, Springer. ISBN 978-90-481-3528-8
- Arturo Carsetti (2009) The genesis of the mind's eyes. In D'Agostino M. et al. Atti della S.I.L.F.S., Milano.
- Arturo Carsetti (2009) The emergence of mind at the co-evolutive level. In Corradini A. and O'Connor T. (eds.), Emergence in Science and Philosophy, New York, 251–266.
- Arturo Carsetti (2009) Embodiment processes and intentional complexity. La Nuova Critica, 53–59, 103–122.
- Arturo Carsetti (2010) Eigenforms, natural self-organization and morphogenesis. La Nuova Critica, 55–56, 75-100.
- Arturo Carsetti (2012) Epistemic Complexity and Knowledge Construction. Berlin, Springer. ISBN 978-94-007-6012-7
- Arturo Carsetti (2012) The emergence of meaning at the co-evolutionary level, Int. Jour. of Applied Mathematics and Computation, vol. 219: 14–23.
- Arturo Carsetti (2012) Regulatory Models and the Development of Mind, La Nuova Critica, vol. 59-60 : 129–150.
- Arturo Carsetti (2013) Intended Models and Henkin Semantics, La Nuova Critica, vol. 61-62:125-180.
- Arturo Carsetti (2014) Life, Cognition and Metabiology, Cognitive Processing, 15 (4): 423–424.
- Arturo Carsetti (2015) The emergence of the enactive mind in ambient meaning, La Nuova Critica, vol. 65-66: 73-103.
- Arturo Carsetti (2016) Epistemologia ed Ontologia, Rivista Internazionale di Filosofia del Diritto, Serie V: 85–90.
- Arturo Carsetti (2020) Metabiology. Non-standard Models, General Semantics and Natural Evolution, Berlin, Springer. ISBN 978-3-030-32717-0

== Selected research projects ==
- Research Project (CNR, 1997–8): "Probability, complexity and inductive inference";
- Research Project (MIUR, PRIN 2000): "Complexity and intentional reference. The emergence processes of new conceptual structures in the light of the late achievements of semantic information theory";
- Research Project (MIUR, PRIN 2002): "Dimensions of stratified complexity and symbolic procedures of self-organization in complex cognitive systems. The emergent processes of categorial perception";
- Research Project (MIUR, PRIN 2004): "Functional simulation models and self-organization procedures in complex cognitive systems. Semantic categorization processes as a channel for the emergence of intentional structures at the level of the evolving mind".
- Research Project (MIUR, PRIN 2006): "Measures of epistemic complexity and knowledge construction. The "genealogical" unfolding of the teleological and intentional roots of thought processes at the level of cultural evolution".
- Research Project (MIUR, PRIN 2008): "Meaning, truth and incompressibility";
- Research Project (LNC, IRP 2011): "Eigenforms, self-organizing models and morphogenesis".
- Research Project (LNC, IRP 2014): "Towards a Conceptual Metabiology".
