= Hrušky (Břeclav District) =

- Municipality
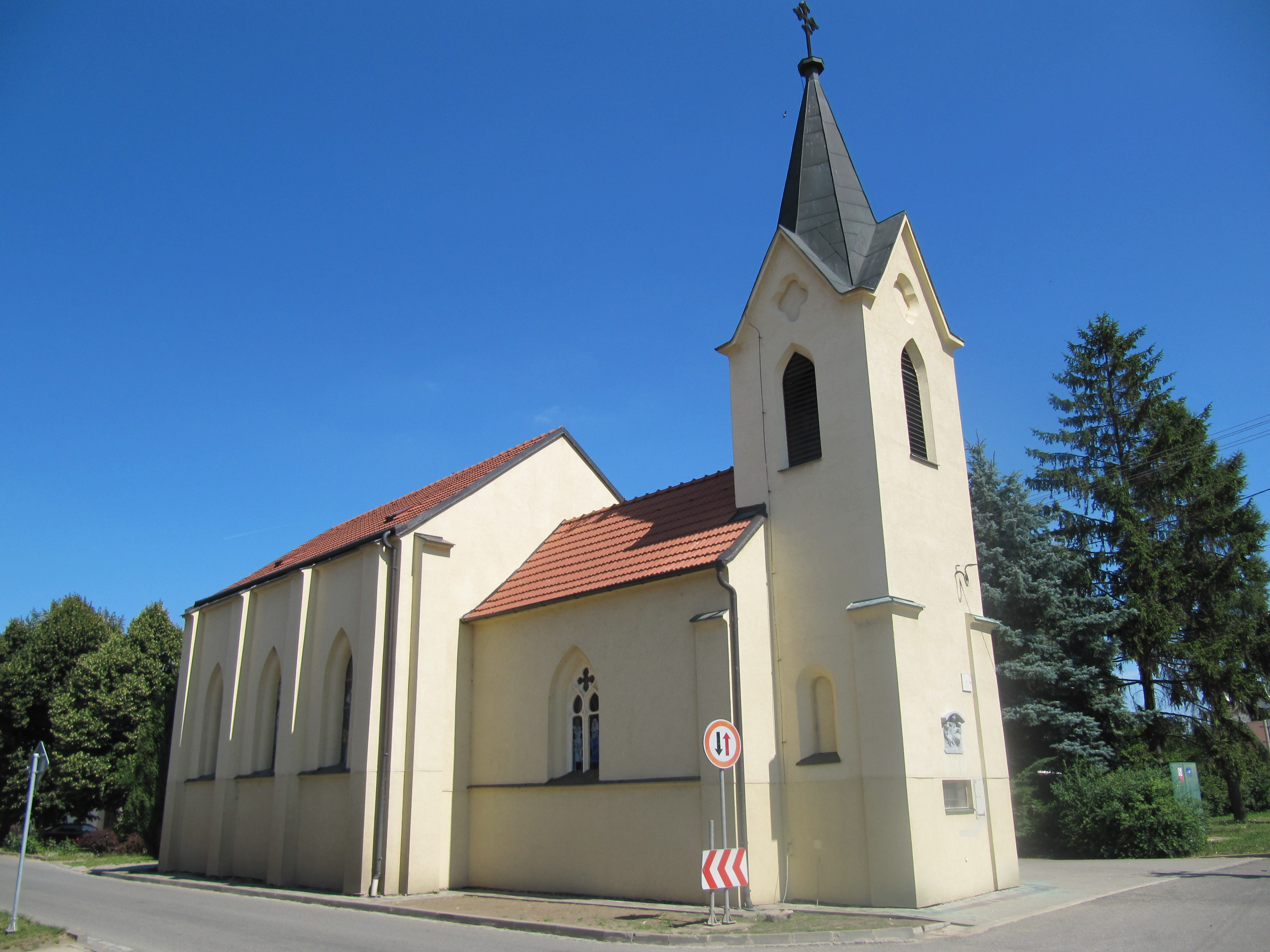
- Church of Saint Bartholomew

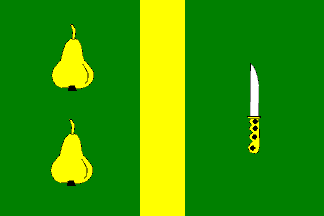
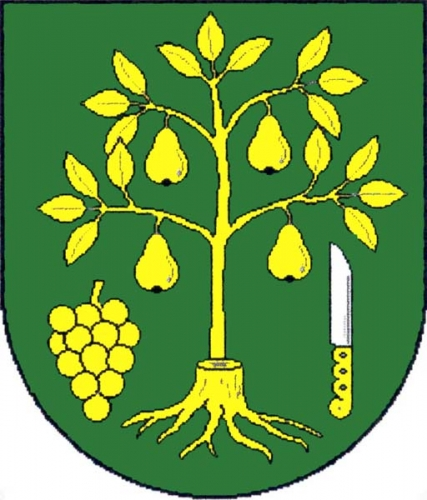
- Flag Coat of arms

- Location in the Czech Republic
- Coordinates: 48°47′34″N 16°58′27″E
- Country: Czech Republic
- Region: South Moravian
- District: Břeclav
- First mentioned: 1368

Area
  - Total: 15.91 km^{2} (6.14 sq mi)
- Elevation: 175 m (574 ft)

Population (2026-01-01)
  - Total: 1,652
  - Density: 103.8/km^{2} (268.9/sq mi)
- Time zone: UTC+1 (CET)
  - Summer (DST): UTC+2 (CEST)
- Postal code: 691 56
- Website: www.hrusky.cz

Hrušky (German: Birnbaum) is a municipality and village in Břeclav District in the South Moravian Region of the Czech Republic. It has about 1,700 inhabitants.

== Geography ==
Hrušky is located about 7 kilometres (4 mi) northeast of Břeclav and 50 km (31 mi) southeast of Brno. It lies in a flat agricultural landscape in the Lower Morava Valley. The Svodnice Stream forms the eastern municipal border.

== History ==
The first written mention of Hrušky is from 1368. The village was probably founded at the beginning of the 13th century. From 1638 to 1848, it was part of the Břeclav estate, owned by the Liechtenstein family.

The village was heavily damaged by the 2021 South Moravia tornado.

== Demographics ==
Historical population

Year	Pop.	±%
1869	1,010	—
1880	1,208	+19.6%
1890	1,358	+12.4%
1900	1,505	+10.8%
1910	1,615	+7.3%

Year	Pop.	±%
1921	1,623	+0.5%
1930	1,906	+17.4%
1950	1,855	−2.7%
1961	1,961	+5.7%
1970	1,762	−10.1%

Year	Pop.	±%
1980	1,580	−10.3%
1991	1,458	−7.7%
2001	1,414	−3.0%
2011	1,499	+6.0%
2021	1,616	+7.8%

Source: Censuses

== Transport ==
Hrušky is located on the railway line Břeclav–Přerov.

== Sights ==
The main landmark of Hrušky is the Church of Saint Bartholomew. It is a modern church, built in the neo-Gothic style in 1861.

== Notable people ==
- Rudolph Krejci (1929–2018), Czech-American philosopher

== Twin towns – sister cities ==
Hrušky is twinned with:

- Waldbredimus, Luxembourg
