= Rudolph Krejci =

Czech-American philosopher (1929–2018)

Rudolph (Rudy) Krejci
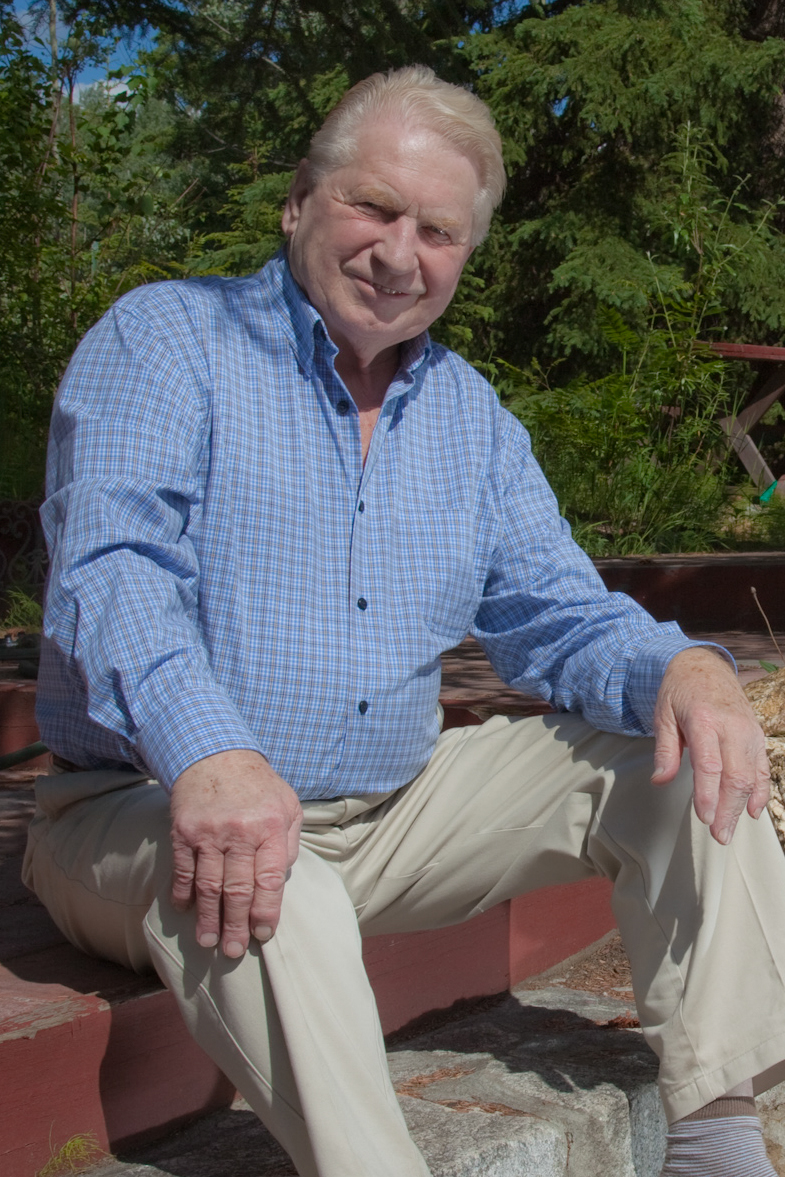
- Born: Rudolf Krejčí; March 4, 1929; Hrušky, Czechoslovakia
- Died: December 9, 2018 (aged 89); Fairbanks, Alaska, U.S.
- Notable work: The "Three Worlds" Idea; "Anticipatory Intelligence Study"; Problem of Consciousness. Ideas and Linguistic Proxies; the "Nature of Eureka and Creativity", Comparative studies East-West philosophy Dissolution of the Realism/Antirealism problem
- Languages: Czech, German, French, English, Russian, Latin, Old Church Slavonic
- Time: 20th-century philosophy
- Regions: Western and Eastern Philosophy
- Schools: Analytic Philosophy, Phenomenology (philosophy)
- Fields: Philosophy and History of Philosophy of social science
- Influences: Pre-Socratic philosophy, Xenophanes, Socrates, Plato, Aristotle, Ockham, Hume, Comte, T.G. Masaryk, Karl Popper, Wittgenstein, Pitirim Sorokin, Goedel, and Vienna Circle, Einstein Copenhagen School, Husserl
- Family Life: Married in 1959 to Helene Wachtler in Innsbruck, Austria; has four children, Sonja, Eric, Anita and Paul.

Rudolph Krejci (Czech: Rudolf Václav Krejčí; 4 March 1929 – 9 December 2018) was a Czech-American philosopher and professor, who was the founder of the Philosophy and Humanities Programs at the University of Alaska Fairbanks, and founder and first dean of the university's College of Arts and Sciences in 1975. In 1997, after 37 years at the university, Krejci became Professor Emeritus of Philosophy and Humanities.

== Biography ==
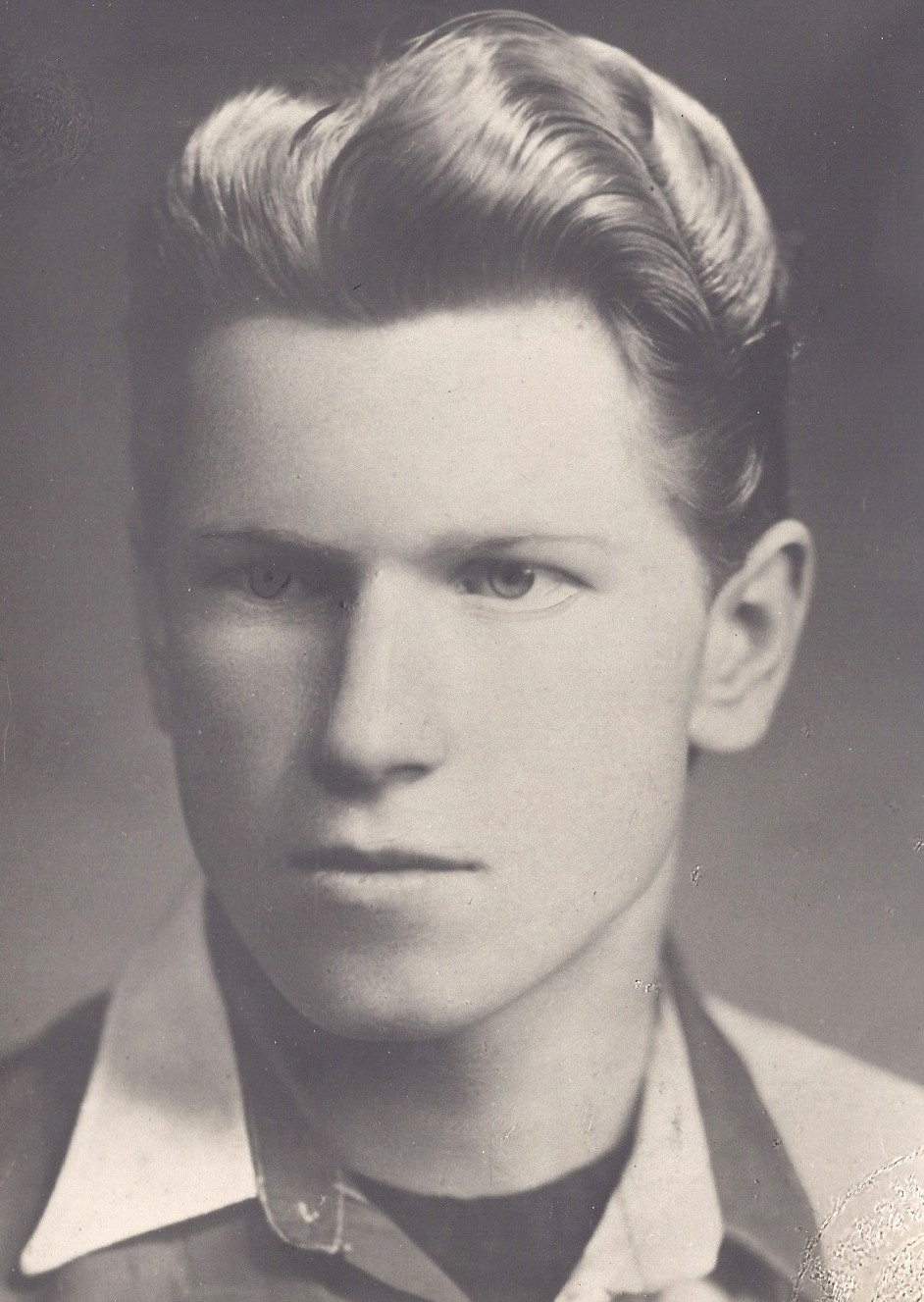
Portrait of Krejci from 1946 in a football kit for Moravská Slavia Brno

Rudolph Krejci was born in Hrušky, Czechoslovakia (now Czech Republic) in 1929. His father, a railwayman, was a Czechoslovak who received his basic education solely in German. His mother was a Moravian-Slovak with Czech education.

Krejci studied at high school in Kroměříž and Brno, where he was introduced to philosophy by professor Antonín Kříž, who translated Aristotle's work into the Czech language. His studies were terminated on May 1, 1949, due to his membership of an anticommunist dissident student group. Krejčí had to go into hiding in a secret room of his father's apartment, where he stayed for five years. In May 1954, with the help of his father, he escaped Czechoslovakia hiding in a coffin under a coal wagon covered with vinegar and mustard, and made it to Vienna, Austria. From 1954 to 1959 Krejčí studied at the University of Innsbruck, Austria, majoring in philosophy, psychology, Russian history and literature. In 1959 he became a Doctor of Philosophy.

Krejci then went to the United States to work as an engineer for Bechtel Corporation and Bethlehem Steel, and in 1960 he was offered a contract to teach Russian and German at the University of Alaska in Fairbanks. Two years later he established a Philosophy program, and 13 years after that he added a Humanities program. After one year as a dean of Arts and Letters he formed a new College of Arts and Sciences.

Krejci's career with the university almost ended during a political dispute with former University of Alaska president William Ransom Wood regarding Project Chariot, a scheme by the federal government to detonate up to six nuclear explosions along the northwest coast of Alaska to create a new deep water harbour for future mineral extraction. In response to Krejci's opposition to the project, Krejci said that "Wood came to me and told me: "If you go on as you do now, there is only one way, one way from Alaska, direct, down to lower states." As a result of Krejci's opposition, Project Chariot never happened.

In 2009, Governor Sean Parnell presented Krejci with the Governor's Awards for the Humanities for "Distinguished Service to the Humanities in the state of Alaska."

== Philosophy work and ideology ==
Krejci was a life-long opponent of Nazism and Communism, and was a vocal supporter of intellectual and cultural freedom, even when his personal safety and freedom were threatened.

Krejci lectured on philosophy in the US, Canada, England, Europe and Asia and cooperated with the International Wittgenstein Symposium in Kirchberg, Austria, Siu's panetics in Washington D.C., Viktor Frankl's logotherapy in Vienna, and Takashima's humanistic anthropology in Tokyo. In 1997 Krejci became Professor Emeritus of Philosophy and Humanities after 37 years of service at the University of Alaska, Fairbanks.

== Publications ==
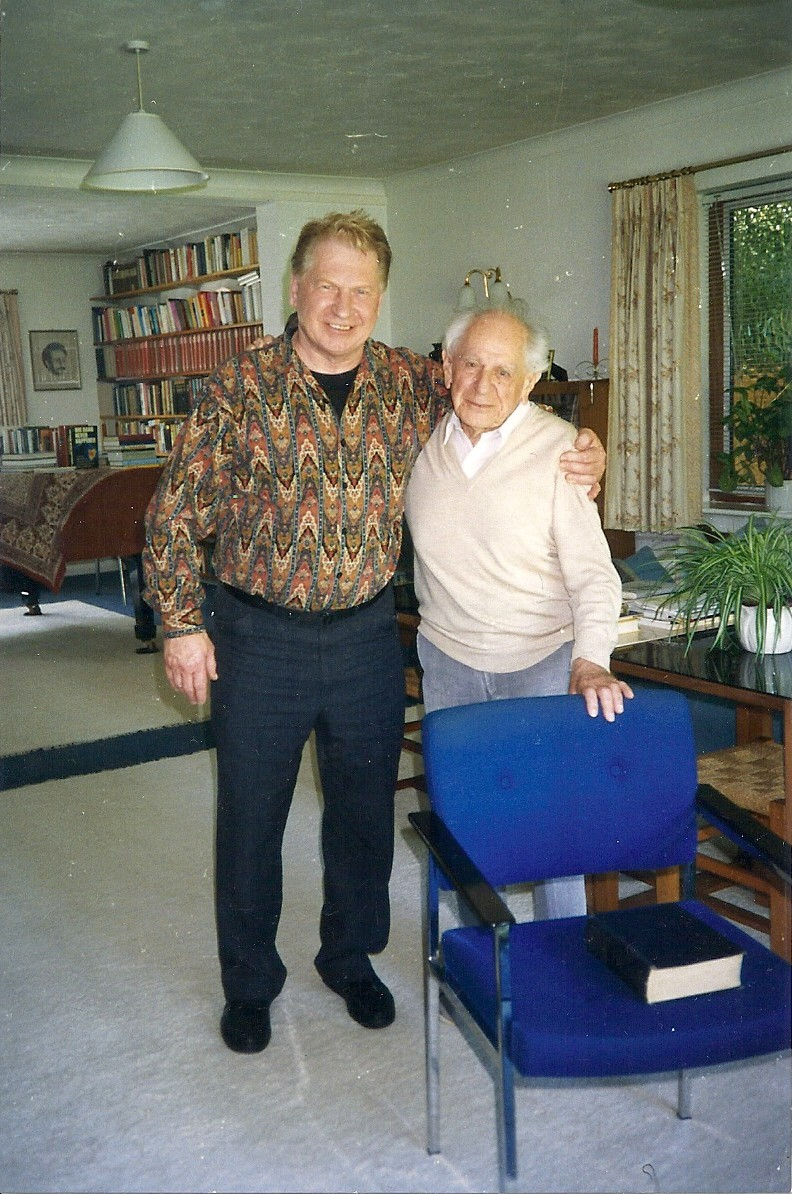
Krejci meeting with philosopher and professor Karl Popper in 1994 in London

- Politics of Coexistence: a paper and lecture in English delivered at the University of Innsbruck to the United Nations Club. Lectures were used for students studying translations into various foreign languages. Krejci's lecture was –ex tempore– translated into German, French and Italian, 1958.
- Essays "Betrachtungen": reports written on various topics for Radio Free Europe, Russian Radio Liberation, both in Munich, and BBC Radio in London. Languages: Czech, German, English and Russian, 1954–1955.
- Russland und Europa: doctoral Dissertation at the University of Innsbruck, Ph.D. Philosophy, Psychology and Slavistics. University of Innsbruck, Austria, 1959.
- World Congress of the Communist Youth in Vienna: Krejci covered the event for Josef Josten, editor of exile magazine "Czechoslovak" in London together with Pavel Tigrid, Czech exile, residing in Paris and publishing for monthly magazin "Svedectvi", July 1959.
- Apologia Philosophiae: Our Limits, Arctic Circle, University of Alaska Fairbanks 1962–63. Program of Philosophy to be introduced at the UAF, written in form of a poem to William Wood, President of University of Alaska, Fairbanks.
- Borealis Institute of Cultural Studies: Chairman of the committee to establish Institute of Cultural Studies formulated during 1965–66 at the University of Alaska Fairbanks as a complementary institute to the Institute of Geophysics, Biology, Marine Science, and other scientifically oriented institutes, 1965–1966.
- Course program of Department of Philosophy: University of Alaska, Fairbanks starting on 200 level to 400 level, 1962-1963 / Introduction to Philosophy and Introduction to Logic.
- Wittgenstein and the paradoxes in Philosophy: 2nd International Wittgenstein Symposium, Kirchberg, Austria, 1977. Philpapers
- T.G.Masaryk – common denominatior of our cultural-political aims: Union of Fine Arts (SVU), answer to Václav Havel's Charter 77, Washington D.C., USA, 1978.
- Problem of the philosophical interpretation of African Humanities: University of California and Los Angeles (UCLA) – 1978.
- Re-emergence of the concept of consciousness in 20th Century Science and Philosophy: 9th International Wittgenstein Symposium, Kirchberg, Austria, 1984.
- Contemporary Philosophy and its foundations: 10th International Wittgenstein Symposium, Kirchberg, Austria, 1985.
- Concrete Logic of T.G. Masaryk – Yesterday and Today: 11th International Wittgenstein Symposium, Kirchberg, Austria, 1986.
- Apologia Philosophiae: Tokio – Dr. Takashima Institute, 1989.
- Realism and Anti-realism in the Philosophy of Science: Beiging International Conference of Philosophy and Science, Vol. 169, published in Kluwer Academic Publishers, 1992 ISBN 0-7923-3233-4
- From Quantum and the Tao to Panetics, Trilogy and Panetics: International Conference of Dr. Siu’s Panetics, Washington D.C., USA, 1991.
- The last meeting with Sir Karl Popper in June 1994 in Kenley: First published in Czech at Masaryk University, Brno, Czech Republic 1998, ISSN 1211-3387. Rudolf Krejci: Last meeting with Sir Karl Popper, Studia philosophica B49, p 155-163, 2002
- Travels Around the World 1893 – 1898 – Jan Eskymo Welzl: Translated from German into Czech, Paseka, Prague, Czech Republic, 1997. ISBN 80-7185-132-9
- Gabriel, Jiří; Zouhar, Jan; Krejčí, Rudolf (2001). Pavlincová, Helena (ed.). "Český filozof na Aljašce : rozhovor s univ. prof. Rudolfem Krejčím" [Czech philosopher in Alaska : interview with Rudolph W. Krejci]. Sborník Prací Filozofické Fakulty Brněnské Univerzity. B, Řada filozofická (in Czech). 50 (B48). Masarykova univerzita: 117–133. ISSN 0231-7664.
- "Zpověď starého filozofa" [A confession of an old philosopher] (PDF). Studia Philosophica (in Czech). 57 (1). Masarykova univerzita: 83–98. 2010. ISSN 1803-7445.

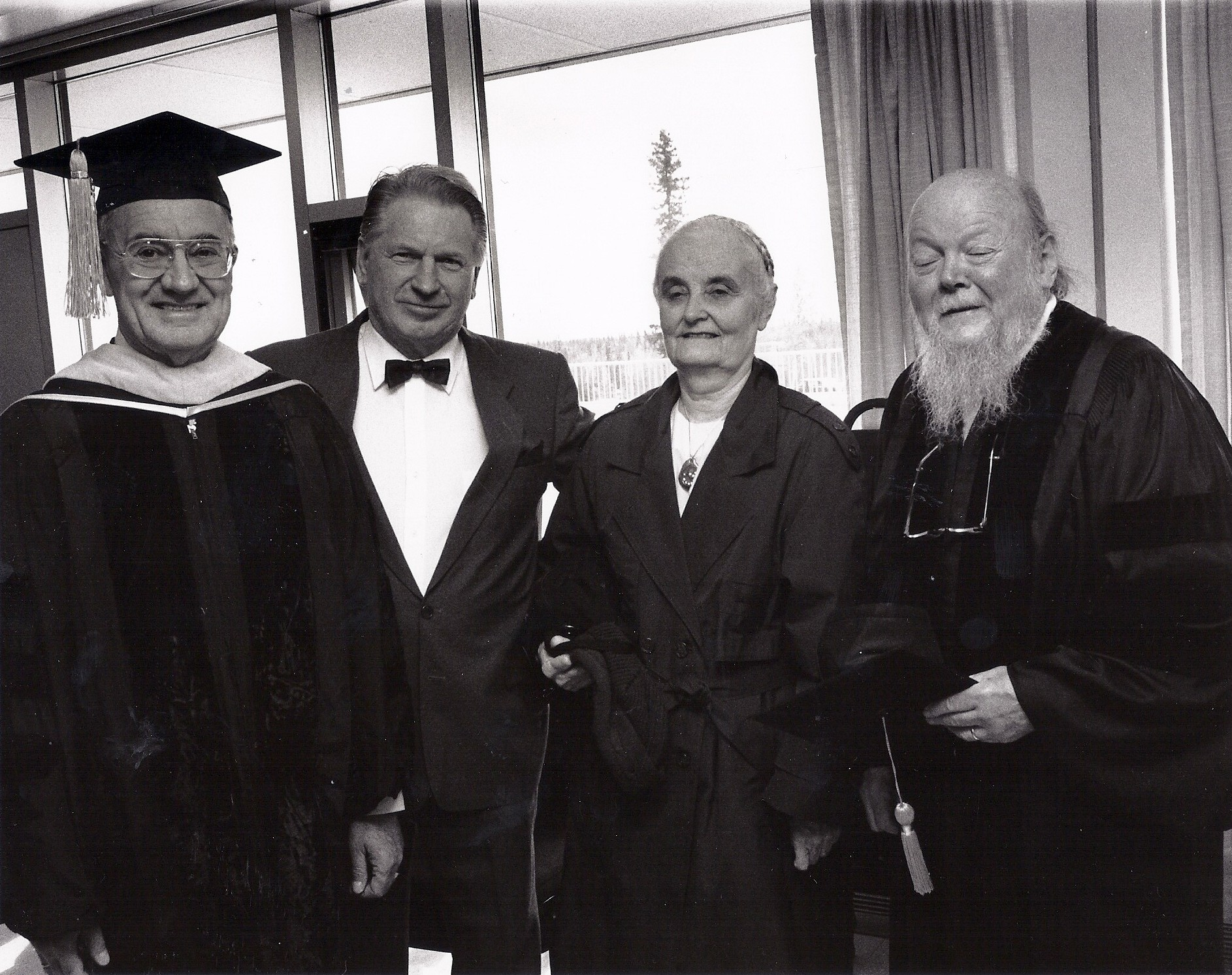
Rehabilitation Ceremony during the Commencement of UA Fairbanks in May 1993. After 30 years the leading scientist at project Chariot, Dr. Pruitt and Dr. Viereck were given an Honorary Doctorate for their contribution to Science. From left to right: Dr. Roederer, Dr. Krejci, Mrs and Dr. Pruitt

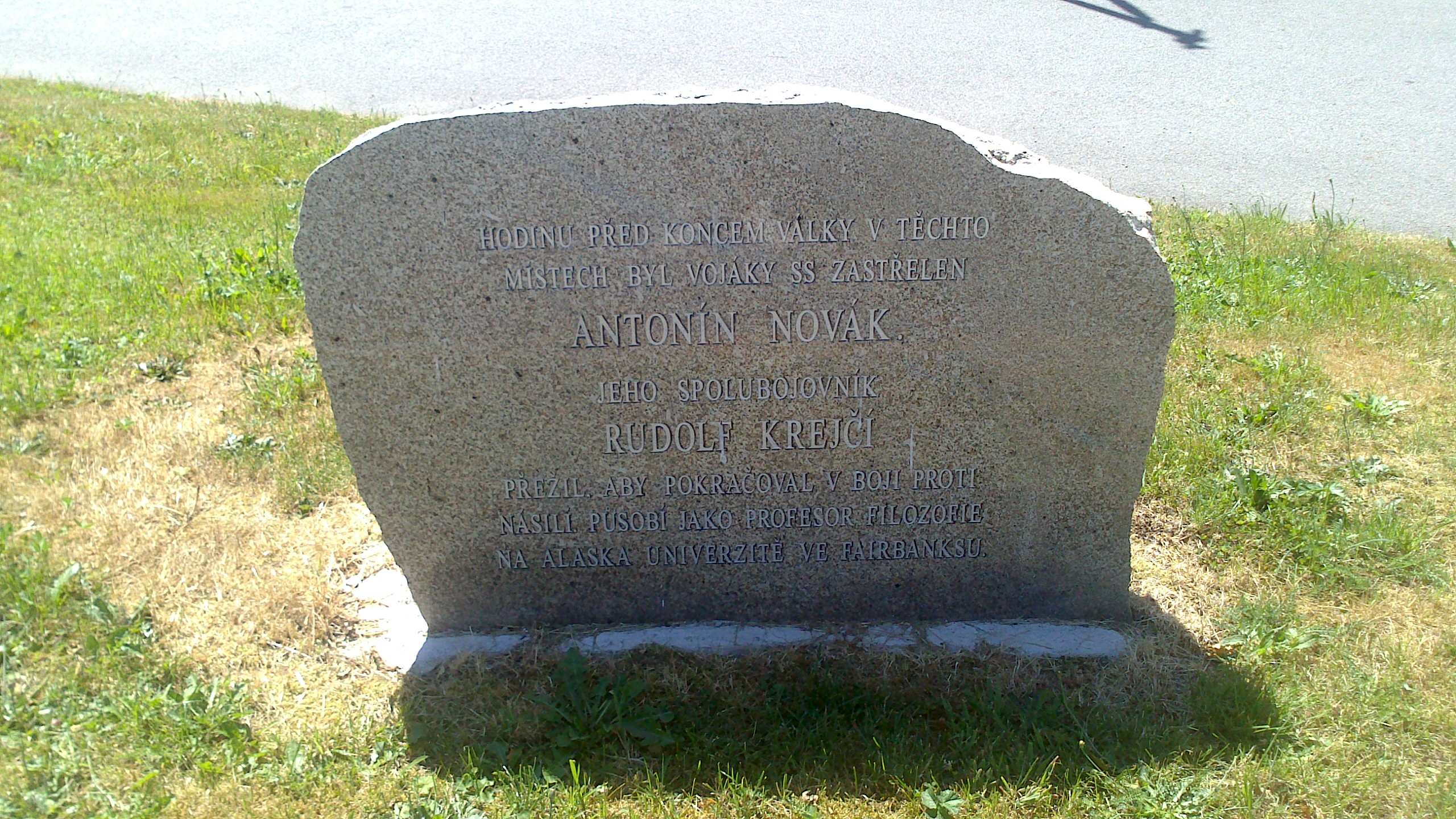
Memorial stone in Hubenov, Czech Republic, erected in front of local public school in honour of this event in 2013. Translation: "One hour before the end of the war, exactly at this place, Antonín Novák was shot by SS soldiers. His fellow friend Rudolf Krejčí survived, in order to continue fight against violence. Now he is a professor of Philosophy at University of Alaska in Fairbanks."
