= Lukáš Krejčík =

Czech ice hockey player

- Born: October 15, 1990 (age 34); Nymburk, Czechoslovakia
- Height: 6 ft 0 in (183 cm)
- Weight: 185 lb (84 kg; 13 st 3 lb)
- Position: Forward
- Shoots: Left
- Chance Liga team Former teams: LHK Jestřábi Prostějov; BK Mladá Boleslav; HC Bílí Tygři Liberec; PSG Berani Zlín
- Playing career: 2009–present

Lukáš Krejčík (born October 15, 1990) is a Czech professional ice hockey player currently playing for LHK Jestřábi Prostějov in the Chance Liga.

He made his Czech Extraliga debut with BK Mladá Boleslav during the 2009–10 Czech Extraliga season. He also played for HC Bílí Tygři Liberec and PSG Berani Zlín.
