= Elisabeth Leinfellner =

Austrian linguist (1938–2010)

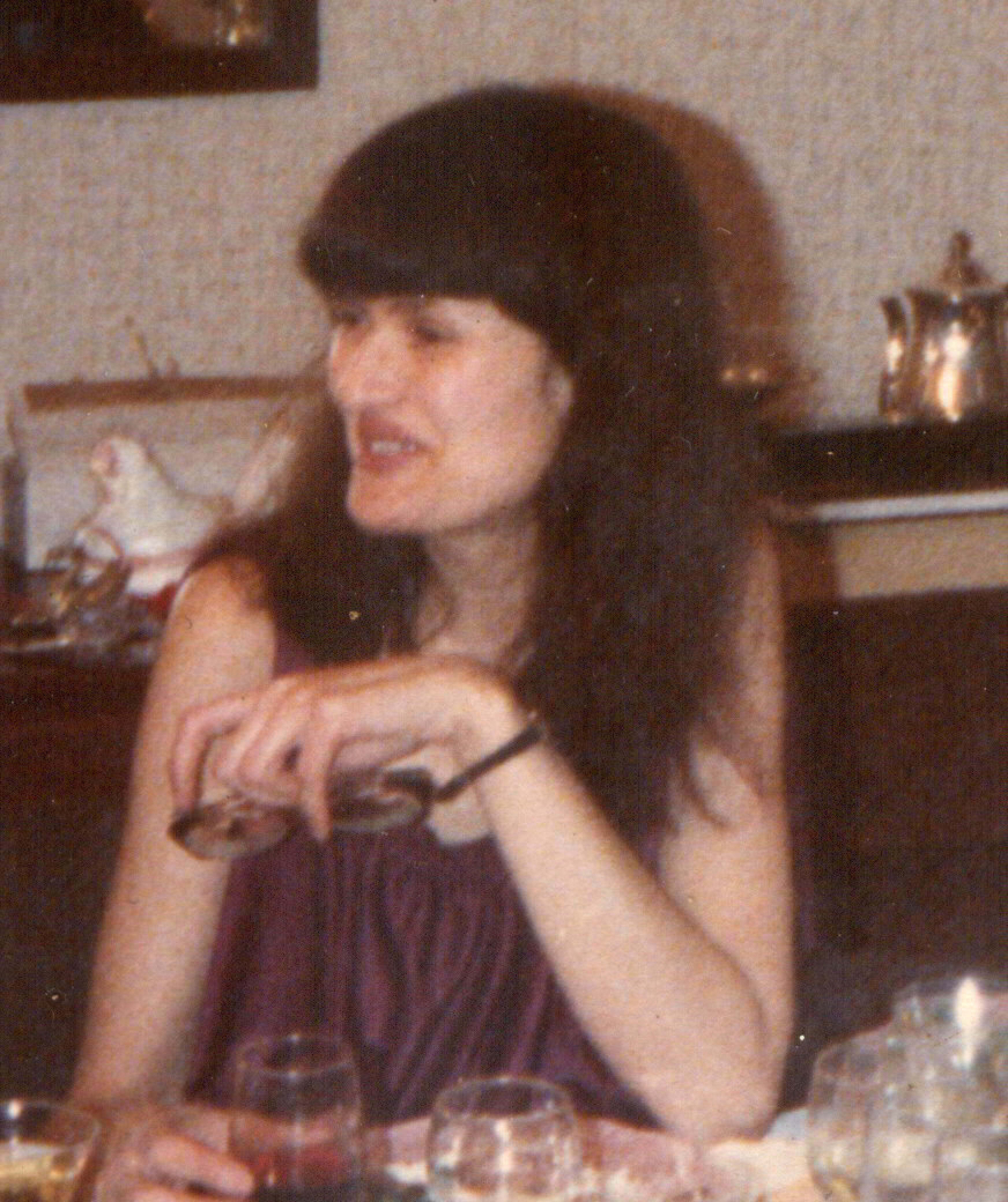
- Born: Elisabeth Leinfellner; October 14, 1938; Vienna, Austria
- Died: January 4, 2010 (aged 71); Vienna, Austria
- Education: University of Vienna
- Known for: Linguistics; Philosophy
- Awards: Austrian Grand Decoration of Honour for Services to the province of Lower Austria for Science and Art
- Scientific career
- Fields: Linguistics; Philosophy
- Workplaces: University of Vienna; University of Nebraska–Lincoln

Elisebeth Leinfellner (October 14, 1938 – January 4, 2010) was professor in linguistics at the University of Vienna, Department of Linguistics. She moved to the United States in 1967, and taught at Doane College in Crete, Nebraska, and at the University of Nebraska–Lincoln. She is notable for her contributions to linguistics and philosophy. She received the Austrian Grand Decoration of Honour for services to the province of Lower Austria for Science and Art. She co-founded the Austrian Ludwig Wittgenstein Society and International Wittgenstein Symposium.

== Biography ==
=== Intellectual ===
Elisabeth Leinfellner studied linguistics at the University of Vienna and LMU Munich and worked as a freelance "copy editor." She moved to Lincoln, Nebraska, and taught at Doane College in Crete, Nebraska and at the University of Nebraska–Lincoln. In 1975, she co-founded the International Wittgenstein Symposium of the Austrian Ludwig Wittgenstein Society (ALWS).

In 1986, she returned to Austria and 1990 she obtained habilitation qualification at the Institute of Linguistics of the University of Vienna with a thesis on semantic networks and context. From 1994-1997 she served as president of ALWS and was vice president from 1997 to 2010. She was on the editorial committee of the new publication series of the ALWS and the reports of the ALWS.

She had visiting professorships at the University of Nebraska–Lincoln in 1992, at the University of Michigan (1997 Max Kade Distinguished Visiting Professor) in Ann Arbor, Michigan, and the University of Rome II in 1999.

Starting in 1996, she organized for the Indiana University of Pennsylvania - Honors College with the University of Vienna and sponsored students. In 1999, she became a member of program committee for the Summer School at the Institute Vienna Circle of the University of Vienna.

=== Personal ===
In 1960, she married Werner Leinfellner and they had one daughter Ruth. She died in a Vienna hospital on January 4, 2010, and her husband Werner followed her in death three months later on April 6, 2010.

== Scientific and philosophical work ==
Although she was trained as a linguist, she had deep interests in philosophical questions. Her research interests were both broad and deep including political language, philosophy of language (especially Fritz Mauthner and Ludwig Wittgenstein), semantic networks and cognitive semantics, political and feminist critique of language, rhetoric and argumentation theory, the application of linguistics to the language of literature, and evolutionary mechanisms of the language development. In particular, she focused on Ludwig Wittgenstein and the philosopher and writer Fritz Mauthner. However, she also published on causality and language, on Habermas’ theory of communicative competence from a linguistic point of view and on William Ockham’s and Franz Brentano’s work on semantics. Her book on euphemism in political language (Der Euphemismus in der politischen Sprache) is particular important. She also drew attention to texts and their meanings as evolutionary systems.

Her research was intertwined with Werner Leinfellner’s with whom she co-authored publications, most notably a book on ontology, systems theory and semantics (Ontologie, Systemtheorie und Semantik). This comprehensive book is an original attempt to connect the traditional philosophical field of ontology with a cognitive-recursive semantics. It reflects their broad knowledge in different academic areas as well as their abilities to synthesize ideas. Their book bridges the gap between ordinary language and the language of theories. It demonstrates that both are governed by the same semantic regularities.

== Selected publications ==
- Elisabeth Leinfellner (1978). Der Euphemismus in der politischen Sprache. (Euphemism in political language). Duncker & Humblot, pp. 177. ISBN 3428025369
- Werner and Elisabeth Leinfellner (1978). Ontologie, Systemtheorie und Semantik. (Ontology system theory and semantics) Berlin: Duncker and Humblot.
- Elisabeth Leinfellner (1992). Semantische Netze und Textzusammenhang. (Semantic networks and textual context). Peter Lang GmbH, pp. 549. ISBN 3631429401
- Elisabeth Leinfellner and Hubert Schleichert (1995): Fritz Mauthner. Das Werk eines kritischen Denkers. (Fritz Mauthner. The work of a critical thinker.) Böhlau, Wien u. a. 1995, ISBN 3-205-98433-1.
- Elisabeth Leinfellner: Brückenschlag zwischen den Disziplinen. Fritz Mauthner als Schriftsteller, Kritiker und Kulturtheoretiker. (Bridging the gap between the disciplines. Fritz Mauthner, as a writer, critic and cultural theorist.) Arco-Verlag, Wuppertal 2004, ISBN 3-9808410-5-7.

== Publications in honor of Elisabeth Leinfellner ==
- Sascha Windholz and Walter Feigl (Hrsg.) (2011). Wissenschaftstheorie, Sprachkritik und Wittgenstein: In memoriam Elisabeth und Werner Leinfellner (Philosophy of science, linguistic criticism and Wittgenstein: In memoriam of Elisabeth and Werner Leinfellner). Germany: ontos verlag, pp. 273.
