= Theory and Decision =

- Discipline: Economics, Decision Science (multidisciplinary)
- Language: English

Publication details
- History: 1970–present
- Publisher: Springer
- Frequency: Quarterly

Standard abbreviations
- ISO 4: Theory Decis.
- MathSciNet: Theory and Decision

Indexing
- ISSN: 0040-5833

Links
- Journal homepage

Theory and Decision is a peer-reviewed multidisciplinary journal of decision science published quarterly by Springer Science+Business Media. It was first published in 1970. The current editor-in-chief is Mohammed Abdellaoui. The journal publishes research in fields such as economics, game theory, management science, and artificial intelligence.
