= Kirchberg am Wechsel =

- Municipality
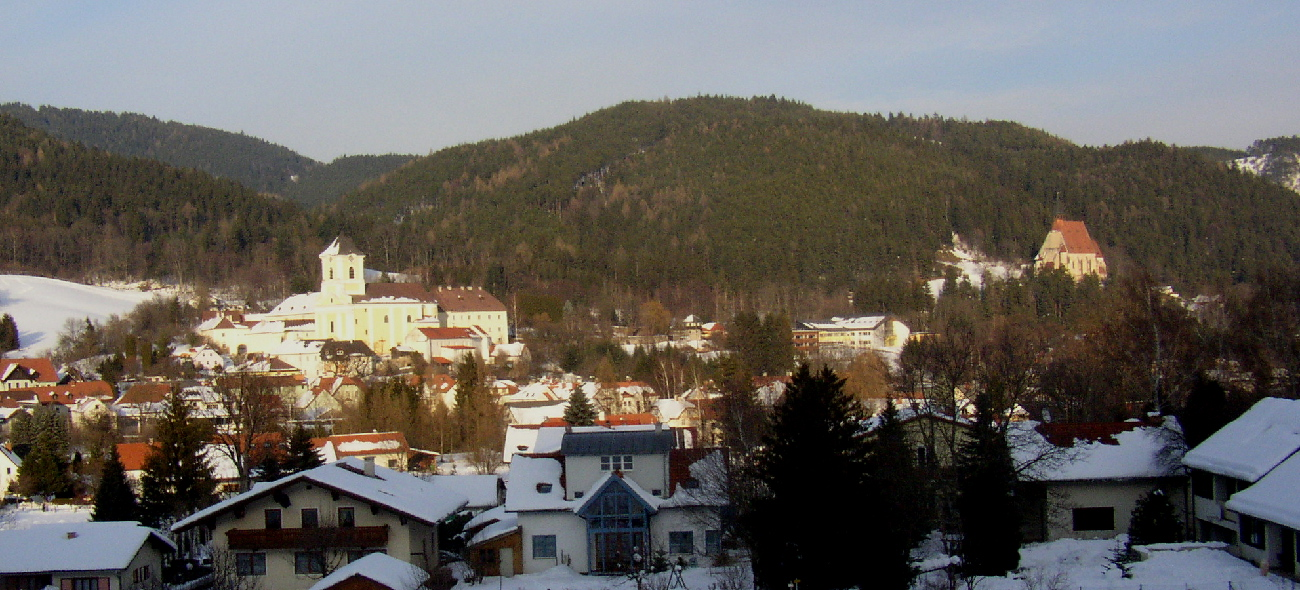
- View of the town

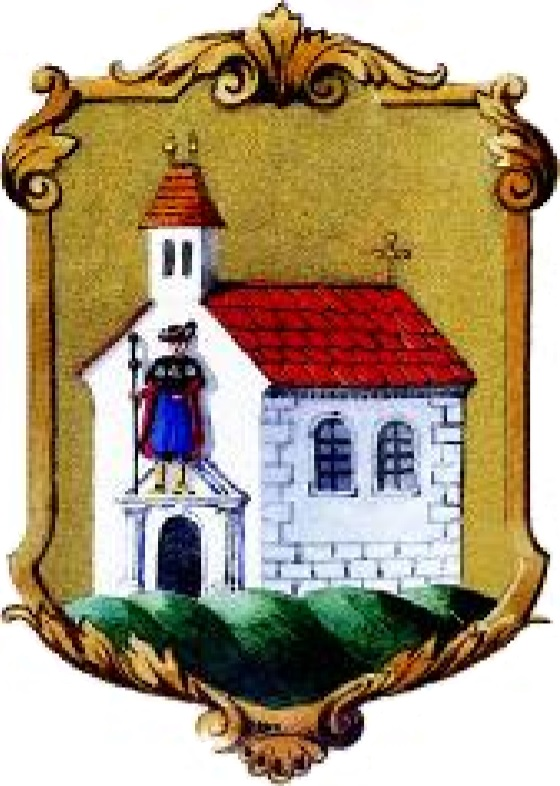
- Coat of arms

- Location within Austria
- Coordinates: 47°37′N 16°0′E
- Country: Austria
- State: Lower Austria
- District: Neunkirchen

Government
  - Mayor: Willibald Fuchs

Area
  - Total: 51.17 km^{2} (19.76 sq mi)
- Elevation: 581 m (1,906 ft)

Population (2018-01-01)
  - Total: 2,505
  - Density: 48.95/km^{2} (126.8/sq mi)
- Time zone: UTC+1 (CET)
  - Summer (DST): UTC+2 (CEST)
- Postal code: 2880
- Area code: 02641
- Website: www.kirchberg-am-wechsel.at

Kirchberg am Wechsel is a town in the district of Neunkirchen in the Austrian state of Lower Austria. It is notable for hosting the International Wittgenstein Symposium since 1976 and is the home of the Austrian Ludwig Wittgenstein Society.

== Population ==
Historical population
| Year | Pop. | ±% |
|---|---|---|
| 1869 | 2,242 | — |
| 1880 | 2,211 | −1.4% |
| 1890 | 2,264 | +2.4% |
| 1900 | 2,346 | +3.6% |
| 1910 | 2,633 | +12.2% |
| 1923 | 2,497 | −5.2% |
| 1934 | 2,639 | +5.7% |
| 1939 | 2,502 | −5.2% |
| 1951 | 2,483 | −0.8% |
| 1961 | 2,406 | −3.1% |
| 1971 | 2,365 | −1.7% |
| 1981 | 2,393 | +1.2% |
| 1991 | 2,394 | +0.0% |
| 2001 | 2,347 | −2.0% |
| 2011 | 2,366 | +0.8% |
