= International Wittgenstein Symposium =

- Formation: April 25, 1976; 50 years ago
- Purpose: Ludwig Wittgenstein: philosophy and science.
- Location: Kirchberg am Wechsel
- Parent organization: Austrian Ludwig Wittgenstein Society
- Website: Austrian Ludwig Wittgenstein Society
- Remarks: Puchberg am Schneeberg is near Kirchberg am Wechsel where the yearly International Wittgenstein Symposium takes place. Ludwig Wittgenstein briefly worked as a primary school teacher in the small nearby villages of Trattenbach, Hassbach, Puchberg and finally Otterthal from October 1922 until September 1924.

The International Wittgenstein Symposium is an international conference dedicated to the work of Ludwig Wittgenstein and its relationship to analytic philosophy and philosophy of science. It is sponsored by the Austrian Ludwig Wittgenstein Society.

== History ==
In 1976, the International Wittgenstein Symposium was founded by Elisabeth Leinfellner, Werner Leinfellner, Rudolf Haller, Paul Weingartner, and Adolf Hübner in Kirchberg am Wechsel, Lower Austria. The location was chosen because in the 1920s, Ludwig Wittgenstein taught at elementary schools in the area surrounding Kirchberg am Wechsel. On the 24th to the 25th of April, 1976 (just prior to the 25th anniversary of Wittgenstein's death), the first conference took place. Only four of the five founders gave talks on his philosophical work at the first meeting, but at the second, 120 speakers attended from around the world.

== Philosophical topics ==
The general topic of each symposium centers around the philosophy and philosophy of science of Wittgenstein, but the specific topics change from year to year. For example, the topic of the second International Wittgenstein Symposium was "Wittgenstein and his impact on contemporary thought" and the topic of the third symposium was "Wittgenstein, the Vienna Circle, and critical rationalism (including a seminar on Popper's The Open Society and Its Enemies)." A survey of topics is available from the site of the Austrian Ludwig Wittgenstein Society.

== Proceedings ==
Starting with the second symposium, the papers accepted for presentation have been published in edited proceedings. From 1978 to 2005 the proceedings of the International Wittgenstein Symposium were published by Hölder-Pichler-Tempsky, ontos verlag, and are now published by De Gruyter.The new series of publications of the ALWS, published by De Gruyter can be found here. The proceedings published at ontos verlag are available Open Access online at a site prepared by the Wittgenstein Archives at the University of Bergen. The Wittgenstein Archives have also prepared a site that contains an Open Access selection of symposium papers from the period 2001-10.

== Sponsorship ==
The symposia are sponsored by the Austrian Ludwig Wittgenstein Society and they are largely funded by the government of Lower Austria and the Austrian Federal Ministry for Science and Research.
