= List of Austrians =

Flag of Austria (Österreichische Flagge)

This is a list of notable Austrians.

== Actors/actresses ==
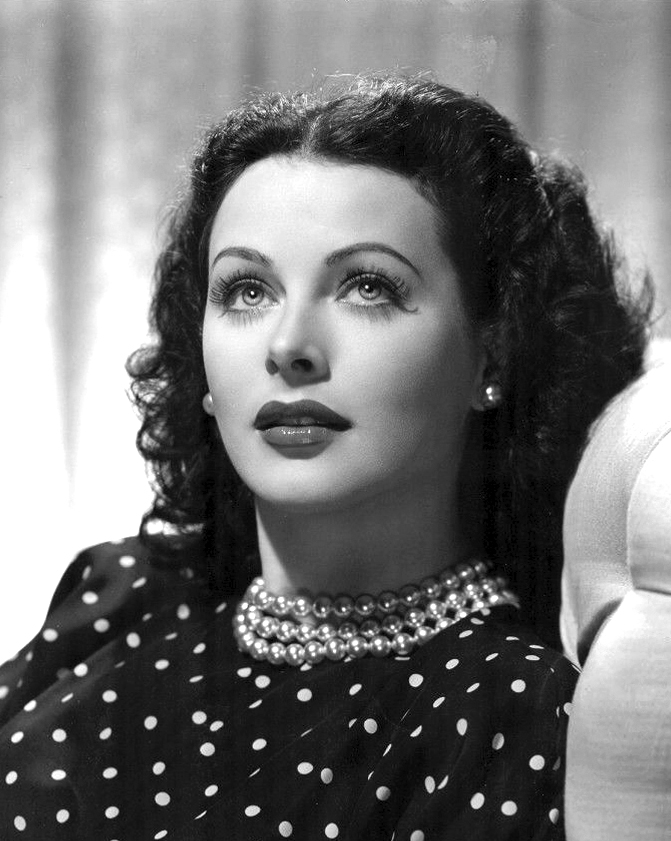
Hedy Lamarr

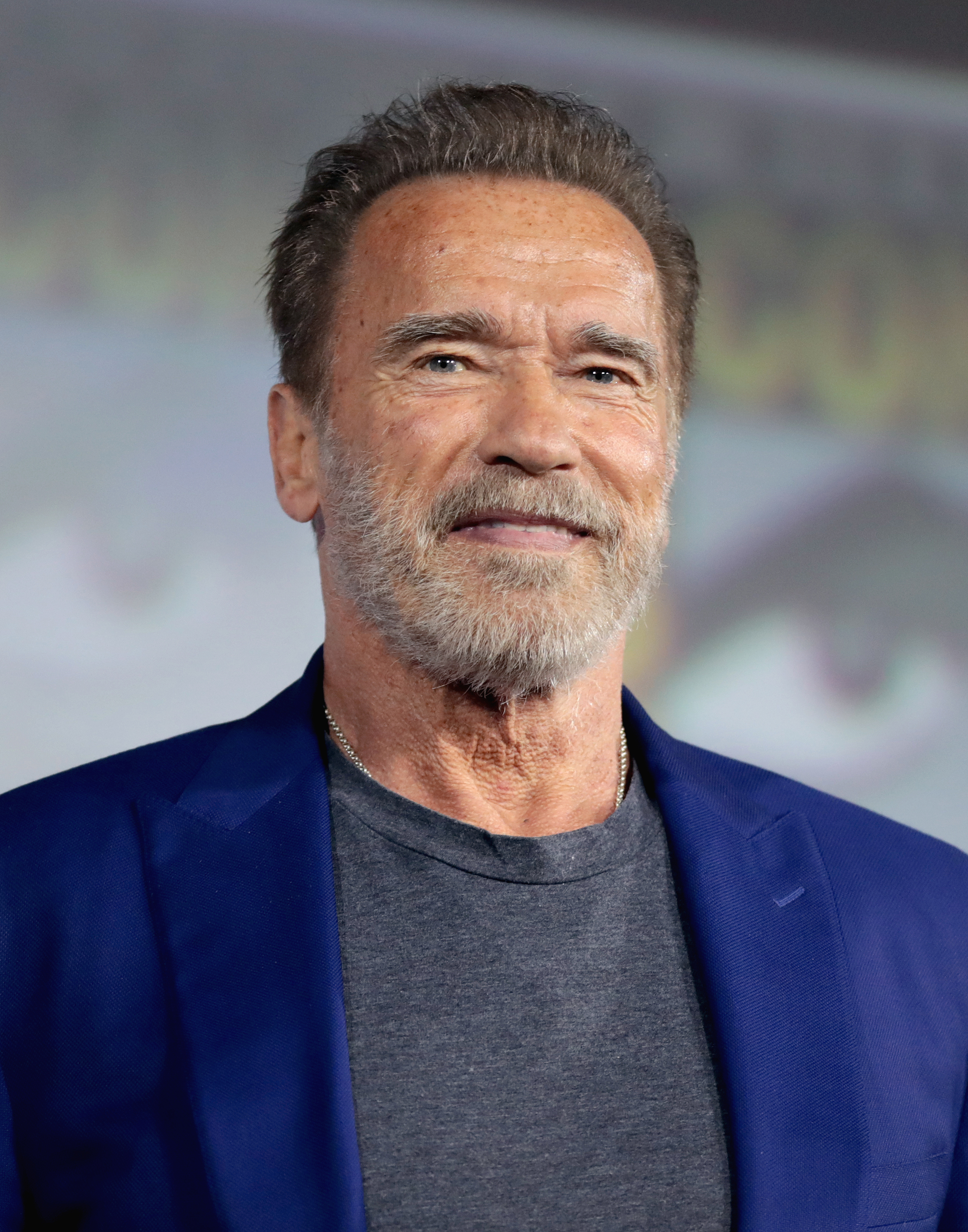
Arnold Schwarzenegger

- Helmut Berger (1944–2023), actor
- Senta Berger (born 1941), actress
- Klaus Maria Brandauer (born 1943), actor
- Wolfgang Cerny (born 1984), actor
- Marie Geistinger (1836–1903), actress and opera singer
- Gilla (born 1950), also known as Gisela Wuchinger; singer and actor from the disco era
- Käthe Gold (1907–1997), stage actress
- Liane Haid (1895–2000), first Austrian movie star
- Attila Hörbiger (1896–1987), actor
- Christiane Hörbiger (1938–2022), actress
- Paul Hörbiger (1894–1981), actor
- Maria Hofstätter (born 1964), actress
- Boris Kodjoe (born 1973), actor
- Melanie Kogler (born 1985), television and theatre actress
- Brigitte Kren (born 1954), actress
- Hedy Lamarr (1914–2000), actress; also co-inventor of spread spectrum radio technology; became U.S. citizen
- Karl Merkatz (1930–2022), actor (most notable for his role as a Viennese in "Mundl")
- Birgit Minichmayr (born 1977), actress
- Hans Moser (1880–1964), comedy actor
- Reggie Nalder (1907–1991), actor
- Nina Proll (born 1974), actress
- Maximilian Schell (1930–2014), actor
- Arnold Schwarzenegger (born 1947), bodybuilder, actor, became U.S. citizen, governor of the U.S. state of California (2003–2011)
- Ursula Strauss (born 1974), actress
- Erich von Stroheim (1885–1957), actor and film director
- Christoph Waltz (born 1956), actor
- Maria Weiss, mezzo-soprano and actress
- Oskar Werner (1922–1984), actor
- Sybil Danning (born 1950) Actor, producer, writer

== Artists/architects ==
- Maria Auböck (born 1951), landscape architect
- Bernhard Cella (born 1969), conceptual artist
- Johann Georg Danninger, 19th-century bronzesmith
- Karl Duldig (1902–1986), Austrian-Australian sculptor
- Albin Egger-Lienz (1868–1926), painter
- Karl Ehn (1884–1957), architect, designer of the Karl-Marx-Hof
- Trude Fleischmann (1895–1990), photographer
- Ernst Fuchs (1930–2015), artist
- Xenia Hausner (born 1951), painter
- Gottfried Helnwein (born 1948), artist, born in Vienna
- Kurt Hentschlager (born 1960), new media artist
- Friedensreich Hundertwasser (1928–2000), artist
- Gustav Klimt (1862–1918), artist, helped found Vienna Secession
- Oskar Kokoschka (1886–1980), painter
- Alfred Kubin (1877–1959), graphic artist
- Adolf Loos (1870–1933), architect, born in Brno (Moravia, present-day Czech Republic)
- Josef Lorenzl (1892–1950), sculptor
- Hans Makart (1840–1884), history painter, designer and decorator
- Inge Morath (1923–2002), photographer
- Richard Neutra (1892–1970), architect
- Josef Pögl (1867–1956), painter, winner of the Vienna Arts Prize
- Wolf Prix (born 1942), architect, co-founder of Coop Himmelb(l)au
- Willy Puchner (born 1952), photographer
- Arnulf Rainer (1929–2025), painter
- Johann Michael Rottmayr (1656–1730), Baroque painter
- Egon Schiele (1890–1918), painter
- Margarete Schütte-Lihotzky (1897–2000), architect and political activist
- De Es Schwertberger (born 1942), artist
- Harry Seidler (1923–2006), architect
- Helmut Swiczinsky (1944–2025), architect, co-founder of Coop Himmelb(l)au
- Aloys Wach (1892–1940), painter
- Otto Wagner (1841–1918), Jugendstil architect behind much of turn-of-the-century Viennese architecture
- Ferdinand Georg Waldmüller (1793–1865), painter
- Felix de Weldon (1907–2003), sculptor
- Franz West (1947–2012), artist
- Olga Wisinger-Florian (1844–1926), painter

== Composers/musicians ==
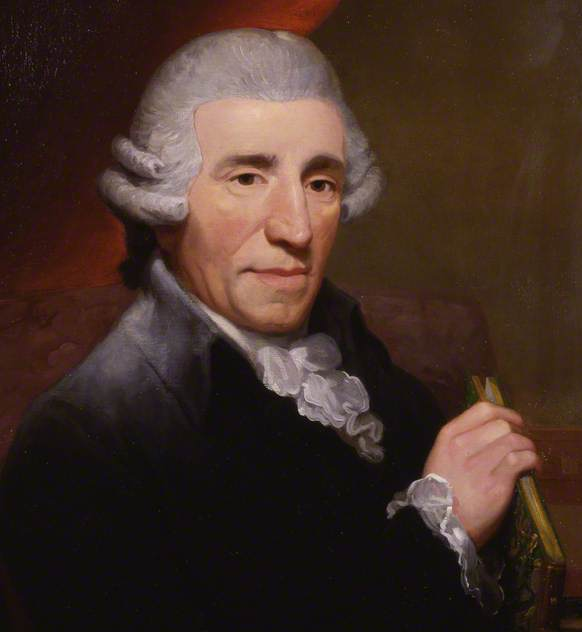
Joseph Haydn

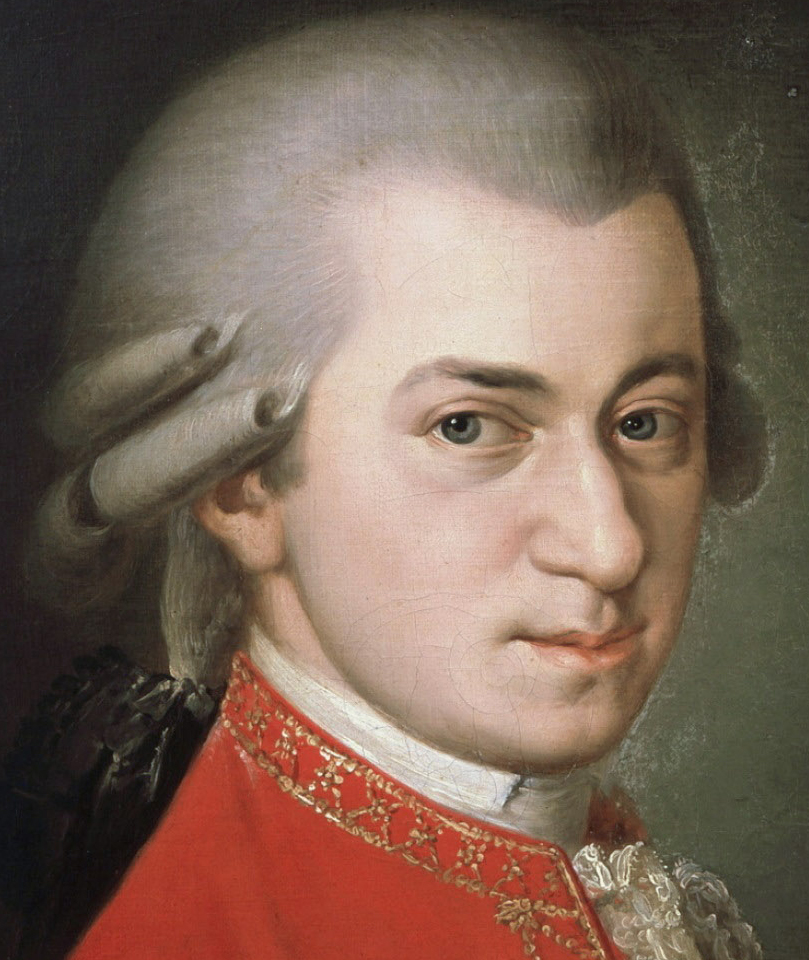
Wolfgang Amadeus Mozart

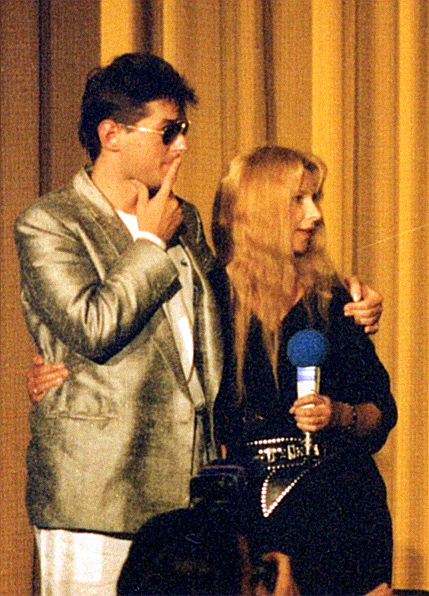
Falco with the Swiss singer Ursela Monn

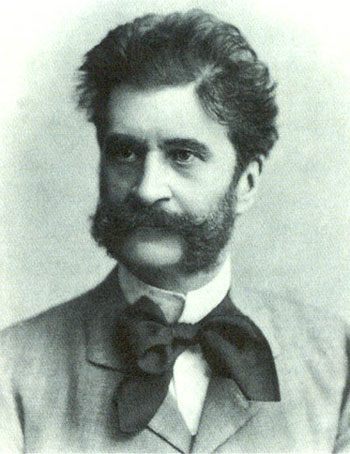
Johann Strauss II

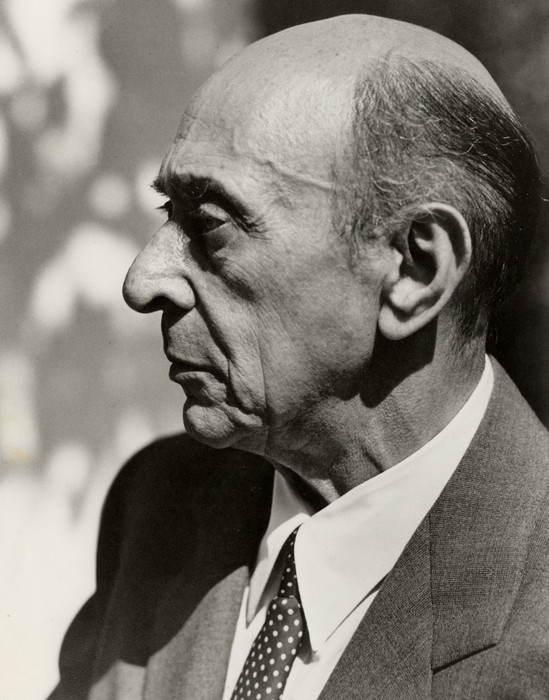
Arnold Schoenberg, Los Angeles, 1948

- Wolfgang Ambros (born 1952), pop musician
- Louie Austen (born 1946), composer and musician
- Ernst Bachrich (1892–1942), composer and conductor
- Caroline Bayer (1758–1803), 18th-century violinist and composer
- Alban Berg (1885–1935), composer
- Alfred Brendel (1931–2025), pianist
- Anton Bruckner (1824–1896), composer
- Friedrich Cerha (1926–2023), composer and conductor
- Carl Czerny (1791–1857), pianist and composer
- Anton Diabelli (1781–1858), publisher, editor and composer
- Carl Ditters von Dittersdorf (1739–1799), composer
- Karlheinz Essl (born 1960), composer and electronic musician
- Falco (1957–1998), pop musician
- Christian Fennesz (born 1962), electronic musician
- Bernhard Gál (born 1971), composer and artist
- Georg Friedrich Haas (born 1953), composer
- Natascha Hagen (born 1974), singer-songwriter
- Nikolaus Harnoncourt (1929–2016), conductor
- Joseph Haydn (1732–1809), composer
- Michael Haydn (1737–1806), composer, younger brother of Joseph Haydn
- Yung Hurn (born 1995), hip-hop musician
- Udo Jürgens (1934–2014), singer-songwriter
- Herbert von Karajan (1908–1989), conductor
- Bernhard Lang (born 1957), composer
- Thomas Lang (born 1967), drummer and composer
- Joseph Lanner (1801–1843), composer
- Left Boy (born 1988), singer
- Elisabeth Leonskaja (born 1945), pianist, Austrian Cross of Honour for Science and Art, First Class, in 2006
- Gustav Mahler (1860–1911), composer
- Marianne von Martinez (1744–1812), composer, singer
- Penny McLean (born 1948), singer with the disco group Silver Convention
- Wolfgang Amadeus Mozart (1756–1791), musician and composer
- Olga Neuwirth (born 1968), composer
- Gerhard Potuznik, electronic musician
- César Sampson (born 1983), singer
- Franz Schmidt (1874–1939), composer
- Arnold Schoenberg (1874–1951), composer
- Franz Schubert (1797–1828), composer and musician
- Parov Stelar (born 1974), electronic musician
- Eduard Strauss (1835–1916), composer
- Johann Strauss Jr. (1825–1899), composer
- Johann Strauss Sr. (1804–1849), composer
- Josef Strauss (1827–1870), composer
- Franz von Suppé (1819–1895), composer
- Nathan Trent (born 1992), singer
- Anton Webern (1883–1945), composer
- Franz Welser-Möst (born 1960), conductor
- Hugo Wolf (1860–1903), composer
- Conchita Wurst (born 1988), pop musician
- Joe Zawinul (1932–2007), jazz musician, composer
- Eric Zeisl (1905–1959), composer
- Alexander von Zemlinsky (1871–1942), composer

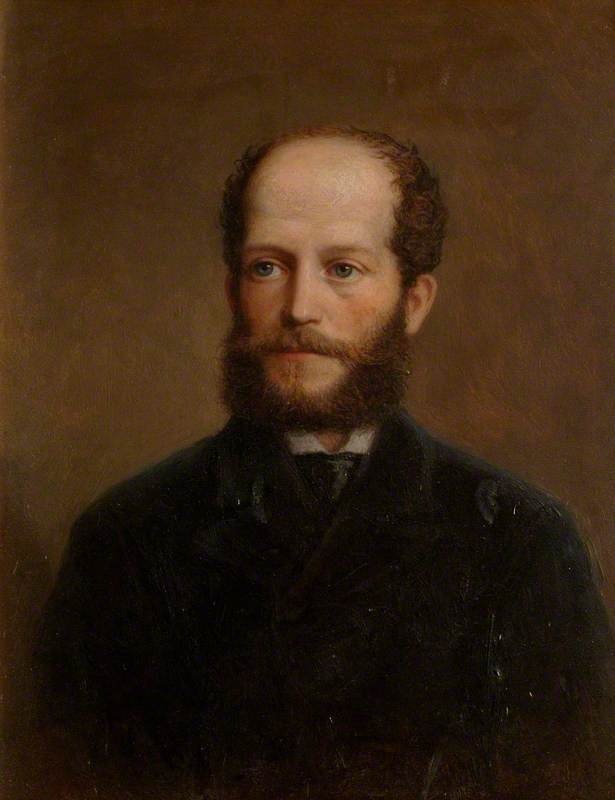
Ferdinand James von Rothschild

== Entrepreneurs ==
- Hannes Androsch (1938–2024), former minister of finance in the government of Bruno Kreisky
- Hikmet Ersek (born 1961), CEO of The Western Union Company, a Fortune 500 company
- Ignaz Glaser (1853–1916), entrepreneur
- Gaston Glock (1929-2023), inventor, founder of Glock Ges.m.b.H.
- Niki Lauda (1949–2019), Formula One race car driver and aviation entrepreneur
- Richard Lugner (1932–2024), entrepreneur and society figure
- Dietrich Mateschitz (1944–2022), businessman behind the Red Bull brand
- Ludwig (Louis) von Nathaniel (1882–1955), banker
- Ferdinand Porsche (1875–1951), automotive engineer, designed the Volkswagen (the "people's car"), born in Vratislavice nad Nisou (Austria-Hungary, Bohemia, present-day Czech Republic)
- Ferdinand Anton Ernst Porsche (1909–1998), automotive engineer and entrepreneur, he expanded the sports car manufacturer Porsche AG to what it is now
- Johann Puch (1862–1914), inventor, mechanic, co-founder of Steyr-Daimler-Puch
- Albert Salomon von Rothschild (1844–1911), banker
- Anselm von Rothschild (1803–1874), banker
- Ferdinand James von Rothschild (1839–1898), investor
- Nathaniel Mayer Anselm von Rothschild (1836–1905), banker
- Salomon Mayer von Rothschild (1774–1855), banker
- Robert Schlumberger (1814–1879), entrepreneur
- Frank Stronach (born 1932), entrepreneur, born in Austria
- Daniel Swarovski (1862–1956), founder of Swarovski AG, world-famous crystals, born in Jiřetín pod Bukovou, (Bohemia, present-day Czech Republic)

== Filmmakers ==
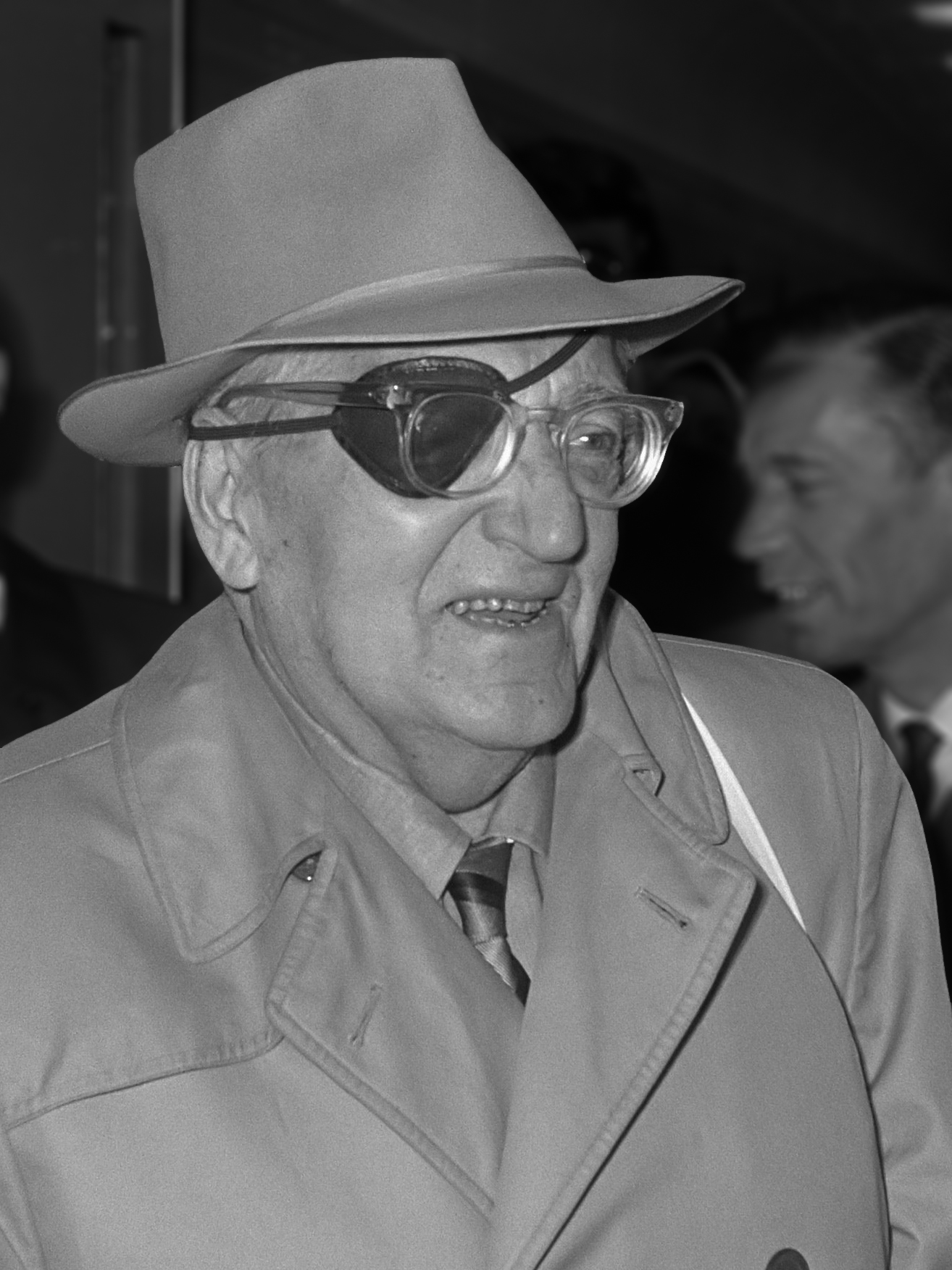
Fritz Lang

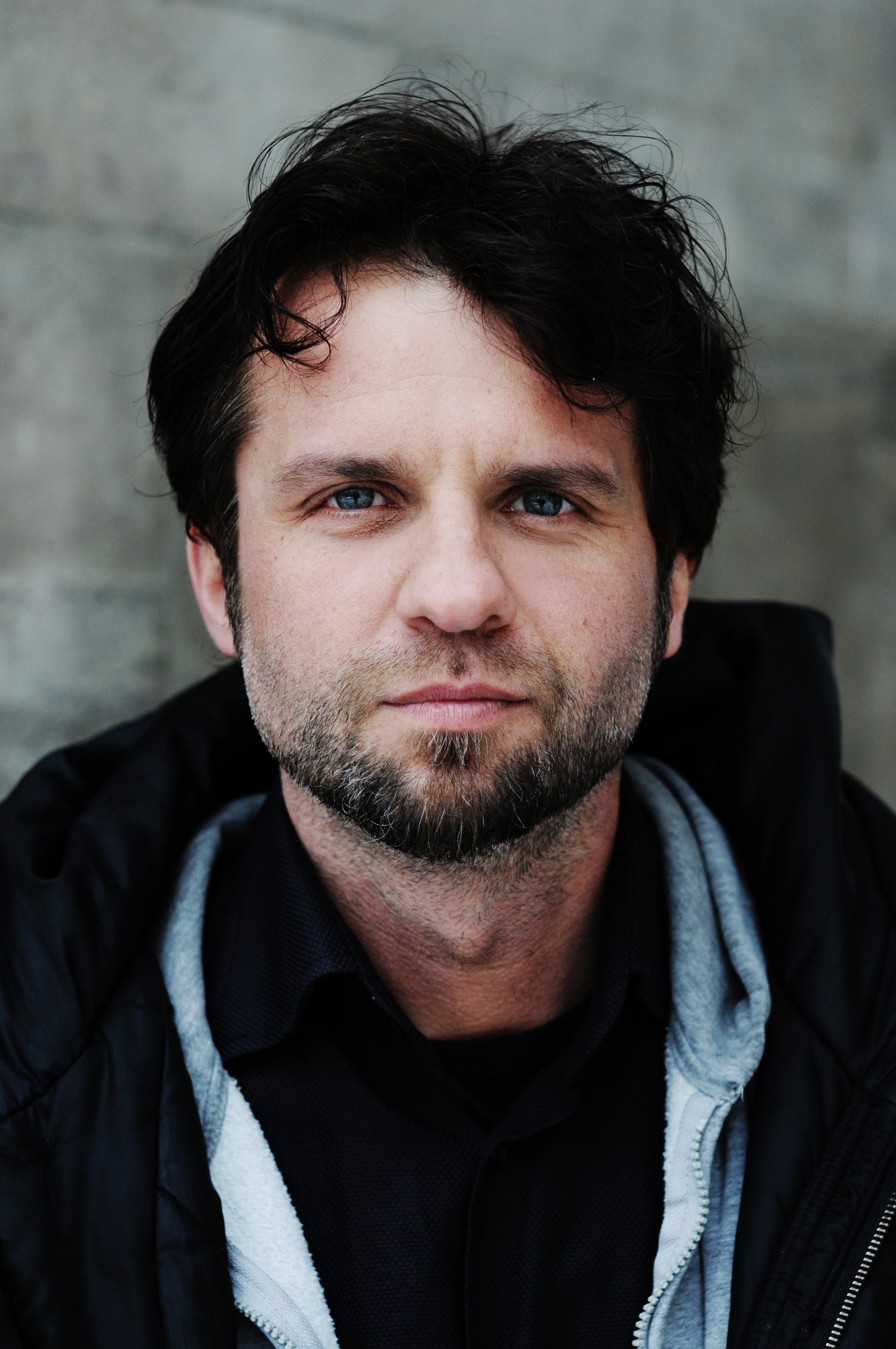
Hans Weingartner

- Barbara Albert (born 1970), film director, producer and writer
- Franz Antel (1913–2007), director, actor and writer
- Axel Corti (1933–1993), director
- Elfi von Dassanowsky (1924–2007), film producer, singer, pianist
- Andrea Maria Dusl (born 1961), film director and writer
- Amir Esmann (born 1965), director, director of photography, writer
- Max Fleischer (1883–1972), animator
- Michael Haneke (born 1942), film director (born in Germany, however lives and works in Austria)
- Fritz Lang (1890–1976), film director
- Francis Lawrence (born 1971), Austrian-American film director
- Otto Preminger (1905–1986), film director
- Stefan Ruzowitzky (born 1961), film director and writer
- Arnold Schwarzenegger (born 1947), actor and politician
- Ulrich Seidl (born 1952), film director and writer
- Josef von Sternberg (1894–1969), film director
- Erich von Stroheim (1885–1957), film director
- Wolfgang Suschitzky (1912–2016), director of photography
- Edgar G. Ulmer (1904–1972), film director
- Hans Weingartner (born 1977), film director, producer and writer
- Virgil Widrich (born 1967), film director, producer and writer
- Billy Wilder (1906–2002), film director, born in Austria-Hungary
- Fred Zinnemann (1907–1977), film director

== Mountaineers ==
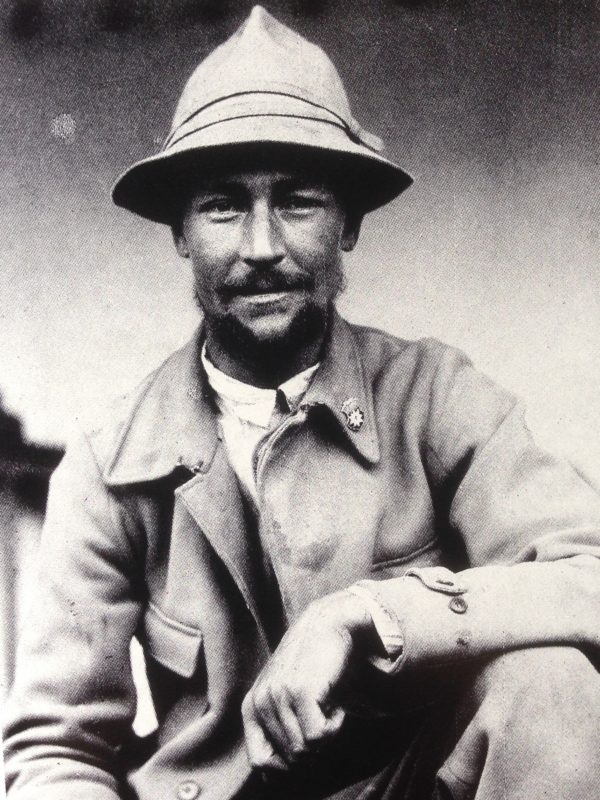
Peter Aufschnaiter

- Peter Aufschnaiter (1899–1973), mountaineer and co-traveller of Heinrich Harrer (Seven Years in Tibet)
- Karl Blodig (1859–1956), mountaineer (first to climb all alpine mountains above 4,000 m)
- Hermann Buhl (1924–1957), first ascent of Nanga Parbat on the 1953 German–Austrian Nanga Parbat expedition, first ascent of Broad Peak
- Kurt Diemberger (born 1932), first ascents of Broad Peak (1957) and Dhaulagiri (1960)
- Peter Habeler (born 1942), first ascent of Mount Everest without oxygen (together with Reinhold Messner)
- Heinrich Harrer (1912–2006), mountaineer (first ascent of the Carstensz Pyramid) and writer (Seven Years in Tibet)
- Gerlinde Kaltenbrunner (born 1970), first woman to ascend all eight-thousanders without oxygen (2011)
- Fritz Moravec (1922–1997), first ascent of Gasherbrum II (1956)
- Ludwig Purtscheller (1849–1900), first ascent of Kilimanjaro in 1889
- Marcus Schmuck (1925–2005), first ascent of Broad Peak in 1957 as expedition leader
- Herbert Tichy (1912–1987), geologist, journalist and mountaineer (first ascent of Cho Oyu)
- Luis Trenker (1892–1990), mountaineer, film director and writer (born in the southern part of Tyrol, then in Austria-Hungary)
- Fritz Wintersteller (1927–2018), first ascent of Broad Peak in 1957

== Military leaders ==
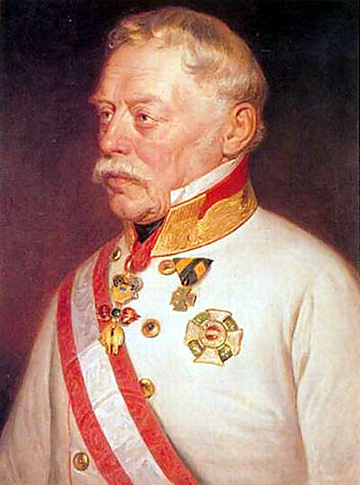
Joseph Radetzky von Radetz

- Haim Bar-Lev (1924–1994), Israeli general and government minister
- Leopold Josef Graf Daun (1705–1766), field marshal
- Joseph Radetzky von Radetz (1766–1858), military leader
- Prince Eugene of Savoy (1663–1736), general in the war against the Turks (17th–18th century)
- Philipp von Stadion und Thannhausen (1799–1868), field marshal
- Wilhelm von Tegetthoff (1827–1871), admiral
- Georg von Trapp (1880–1947), navy officer
- Alfred I, Prince of Windisch-Grätz (1787–1862), general
- Archduke Charles of Austria (1771–1847), fought against Napoleon

== Politicians ==
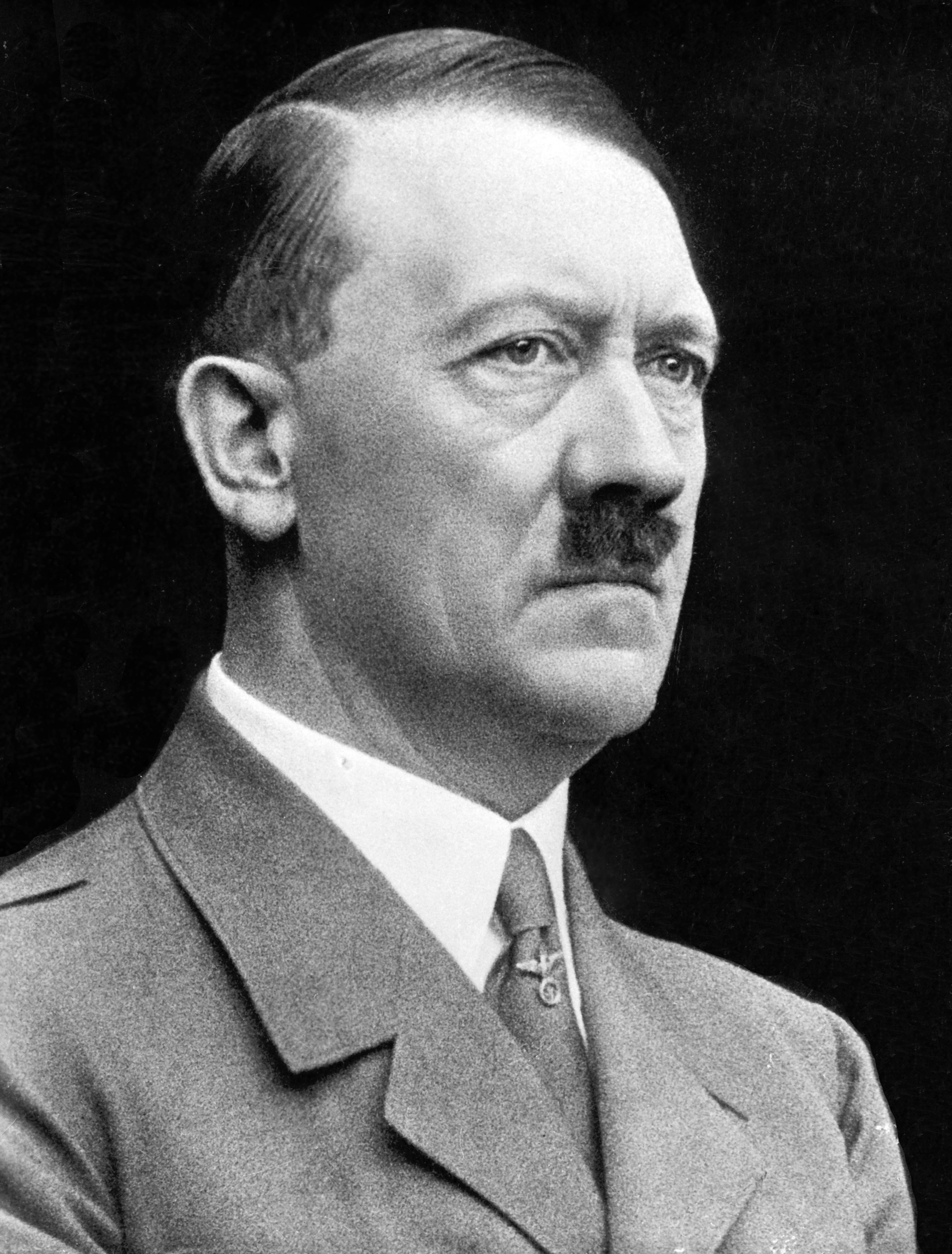
Adolf Hitler

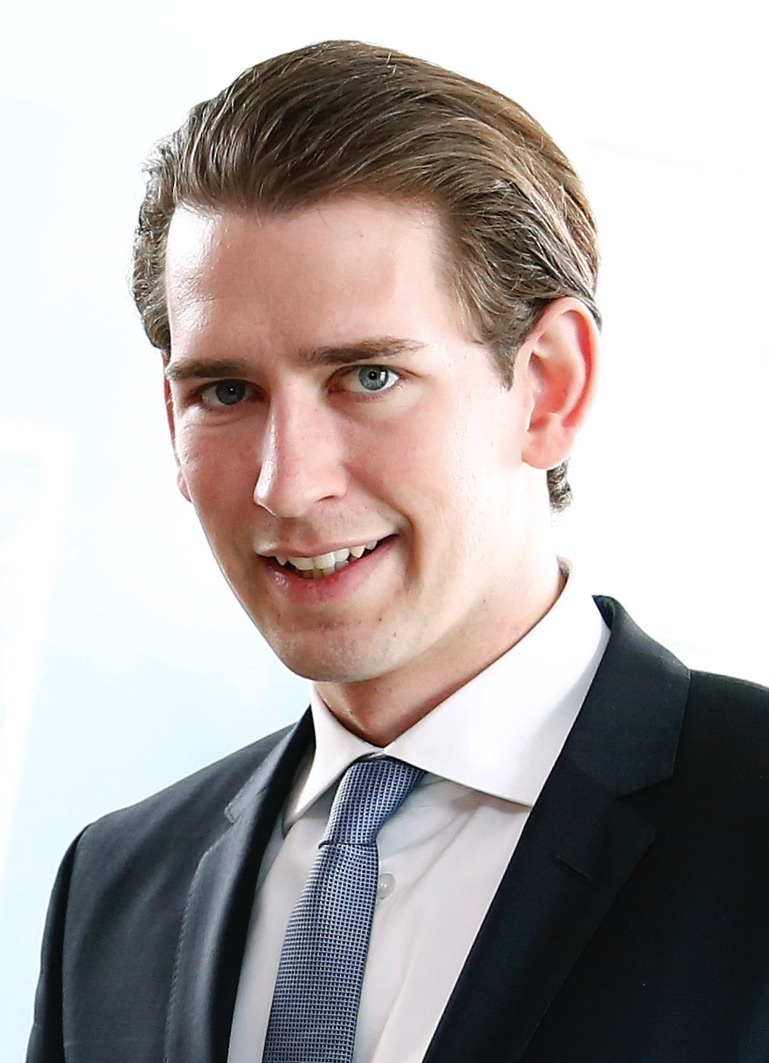
Sebastian Kurz

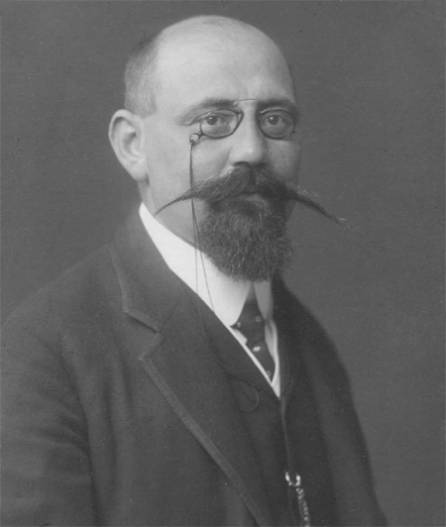
Karl Renner

- Kasimir Felix Graf Badeni (1846–1909), statesman and diplomat
- Leopold Graf Berchtold (1863–1942), foreign minister at the outbreak of the First World War
- Brigitte Bierlein (1949–2024), Chancellor 2019–2020
- Richard von Coudenhove-Kalergi (1894–1972), politician and writer
- Engelbert Dollfuß (1892–1934), Chancellor 1932–1934 (First Republic), established Austrofascism
- Leopold Figl (1902–1965), Chancellor 1945–1953, foreign minister 1953–1959
- Heinz Fischer (born 1938), former President
- Werner Faymann (born 1960), former Chancellor
- Jörg Haider (1950–2008), politician, governour of Carinthia until his death in 2008
- Adolf Hitler (1889–1945), leader of Nazi Germany 1933–1945, gained German citizenship in 1932, and became German Chancellor in 1933. In 1938, he annexed Austria with the Anschluß
- Joseph Hormayr Freiherr zu Hortenburg (1781–1848), statesman and historian
- Theodor Innitzer (1875–1955), cardinal archbishop of Vienna 1932–1955, minister of social affairs 1929–1930
- Ernst Kaltenbrunner (1903–1946), NSDAP politician
- Wenzel Anton Graf Kaunitz (1711–1794), statesman
- Christian Kern (born 1966), Chancellor 2016–2017
- Rudolf Kirchschläger (1915–2000), judge, diplomat and President 1974–1986
- Thomas Klestil (1932–2004), diplomat, President 1992–2004
- Teddy Kollek (1911–2007), Israeli Mayor of Jerusalem
- Bruno Kreisky (1911–1990), Chancellor 1970–1983, foreign minister 1959–1966
- Sebastian Kurz (born 1986), Chancellor 2017–2019, 2020–2021
- Klemens Wenzel von Metternich (1773–1859), diplomat and statesman
- Julius Raab (1891–1964), Chancellor 1953–1961 (1773–1859)
- Adolf Schärf (1890–1965), President 1957–1965
- Anton von Schmerling (1805–1893), statesman (liberal movement of the 19th century)
- Kurt Schuschnigg (1897–1977), Chancellor 1934–1938
- Wolfgang Schüssel (born 1945), Chancellor 2000–2007
- Arnold Schwarzenegger (born 1947), former governor of California
- Ignaz Seipel (1876–1932), Catholic priest, Chancellor 1922–1924 and 1926–1929
- Arthur Seyß-Inquart (1892–1946), NSDAP politician, last Chancellor before the Anschluss in 1938
- Johann Philipp von Stadion (1763–1824), statesman, foreign minister and diplomat 1763–1824
- Alexander Van der Bellen (born 1944), former chairman of the Austrian Green Party and President since 2017
- Kurt Waldheim (1918–2007), diplomat and politician, UN Secretary-General 1972–1982, President of Austria 1986–1992

== Religious leaders ==
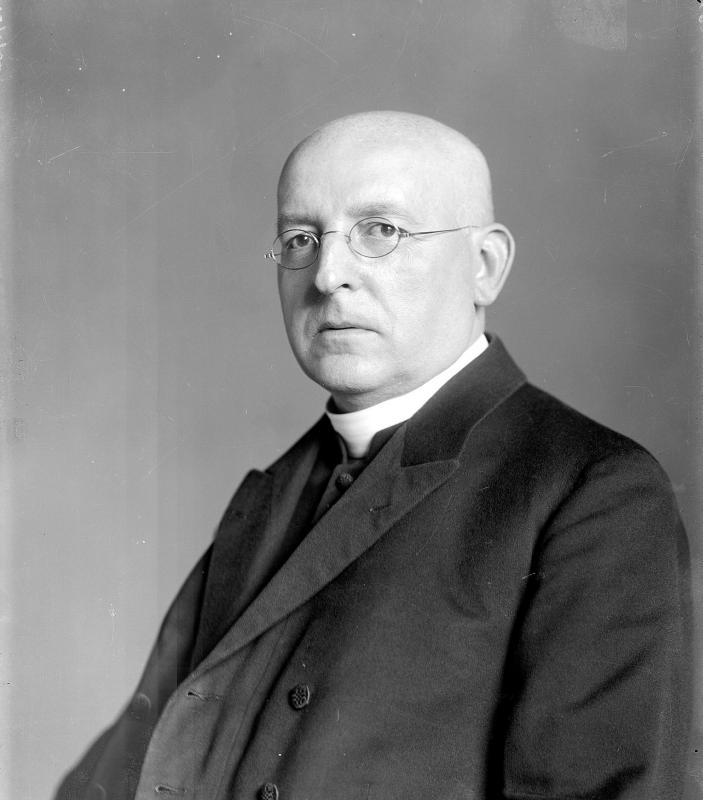
Ignaz Seipel

- Theodor Innitzer (1875–1955), cardinal archbishop of Vienna 1932–1955, minister of social affairs 1929–1930
- Gertraud Knoll (born 1958), Lutheran pastor, superintendent and politician
- Franz König (1905–2004), Cardinal Archbishop of Vienna (1956–1985)
- Christoph Schönborn (born 1945), archbishop and cardinal
- Ignaz Seipel (1876–1932), Catholic priest, Chancellor 1922–1924 and 1926–1929

== Royalty ==
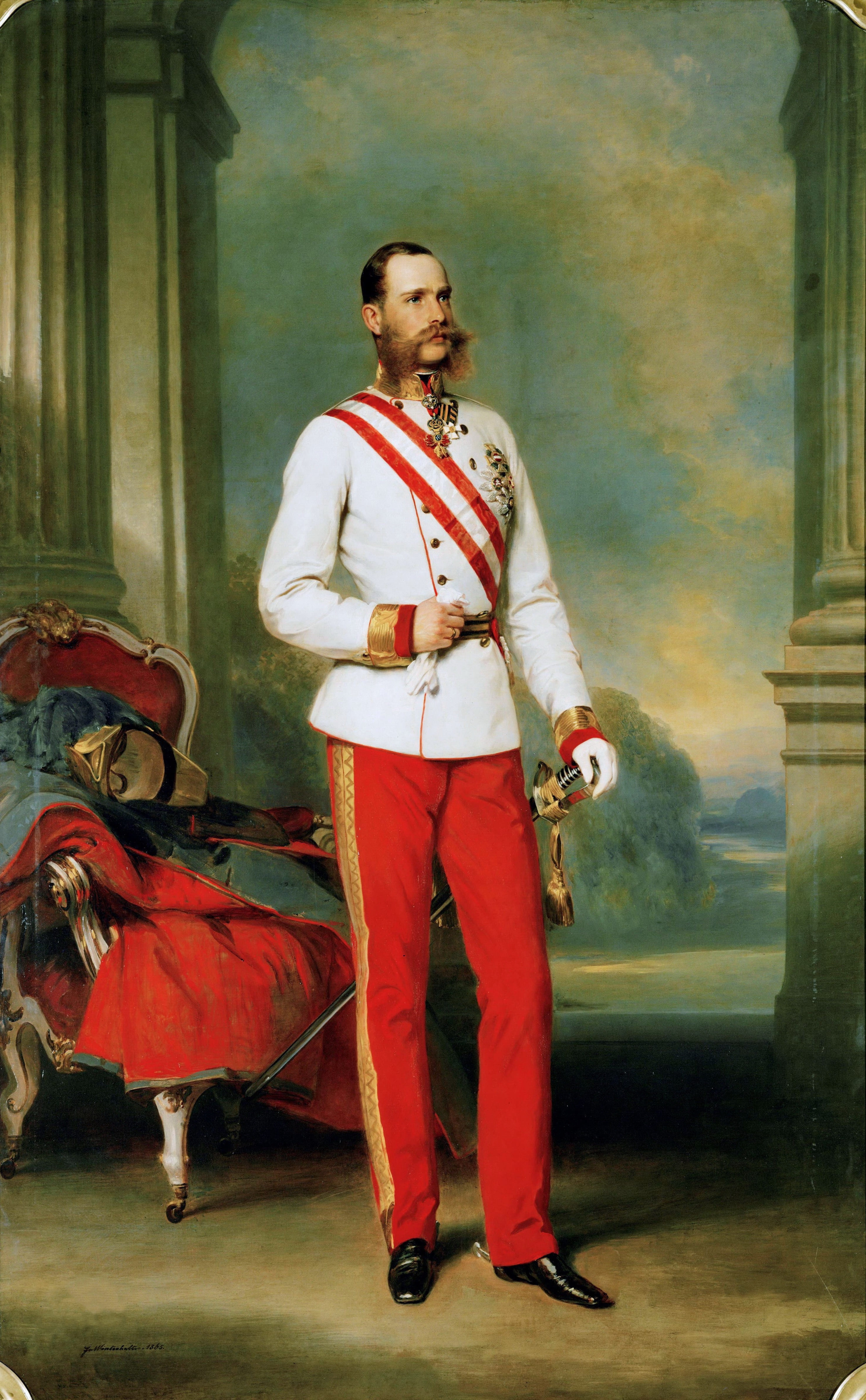
Franz Joseph I of Austria

- Elisabeth, Empress-Consort of Austria, wife of Francis Joseph I
- Ferdinand I, Emperor of Austria
- Francis Joseph I, Emperor of Austria
- Francis II/I, Holy Roman Emperor, first Emperor of Austria
- Franz Ferdinand, Archduke (assassinated in 1914)
- Frederick II of Austria, last Babenberger duke of Austria
- Joseph II, Holy Roman Emperor, reformer (abolished the death penalty) 1780–1790
- Karl I, last Emperor of Austria
- Karl V, Holy Roman Emperor (1500–1558)
- Leopold V, Babenberg duke of Austria, participated in the Third Crusade
- Maria Leopoldina, Archduchess, became Empress of Brazil
- Maria Theresia, Archduchess of Austria, Holy Roman Empress-Consort, last male-line Habsburg
- Marie Antoinette, Archduchess, became Queen of France
- Maximilian I, Holy Roman Emperor (1459–1519)
- Maximilian I, Emperor of Mexico, Archduke of Austria
- Rudolf, Crown Prince of Austria, Archduke of Austria
- Rudolph I, King of Germany, first Habsburg king
- Rudolf IV of Austria, Duke of Austria, self-styled archduke 1358–1365 (Privilegium Maius)

== Scientists ==
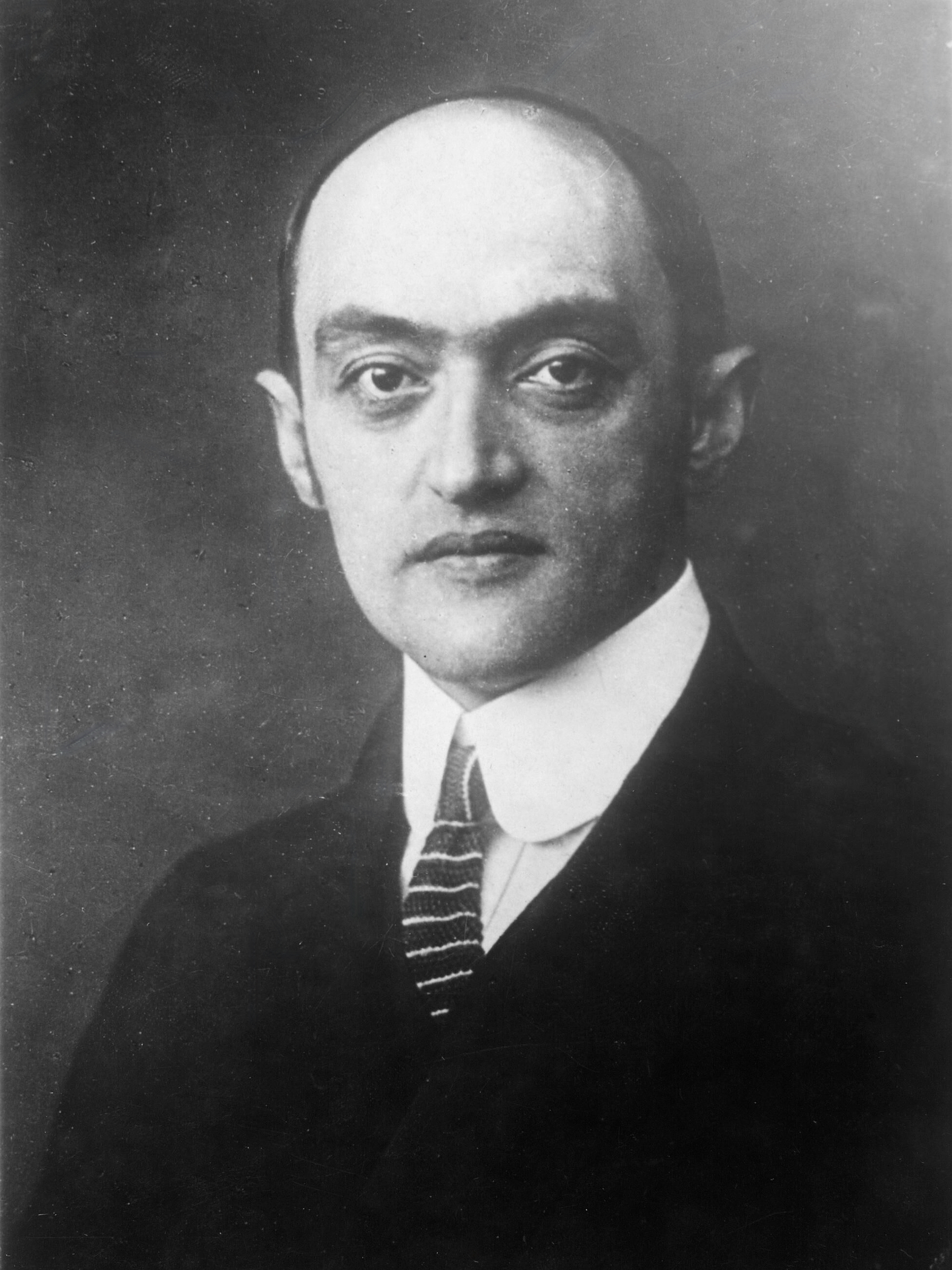
Joseph Schumpeter

=== Economists ===
- Eugen von Böhm-Bawerk (1851–1914), economist and early member of the Austrian School of Economics
- Gottfried von Haberler (1900–1995), Austrian-American economist, born in Purkersdorf, Austria-Hungary
- Friedrich Hayek (1899–1992), economist and social scientist, Bank of Sweden Prize in Economic Sciences in Memory of Alfred Nobel 1974 (became a British citizen in 1938)
- Leopold Kohr (1909–1994), economist, jurist and political scientist
- Fritz Machlup (1902–1983), Austrian-American economist, born in Wiener Neustadt, Austria-Hungary
- Carl Menger (1840–1921), founder of the Austrian School of economics
- Ludwig von Mises (1881–1973), free-market economist
- Oskar Morgenstern (1902–1977), co-founder of game theory
- Otto Neurath (1882–1945), socialist, economist and philosopher
- Joseph Schumpeter (1883–1950), economist, born in Triesch, Austria-Hungary
- Friedrich von Wieser (1851–1926), economist of the Austrian School

=== Engineers/inventors ===
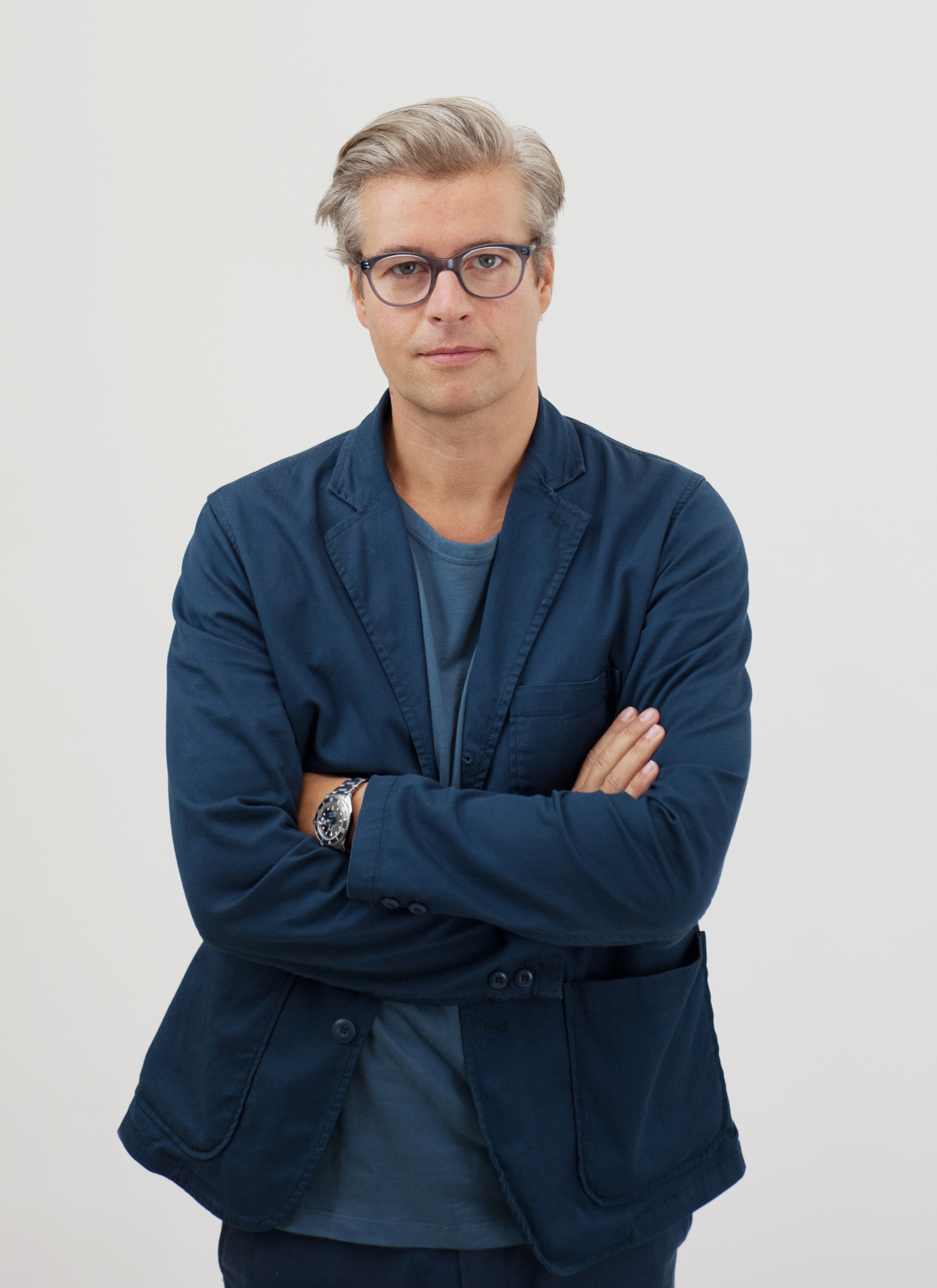
Thomas Feichtner

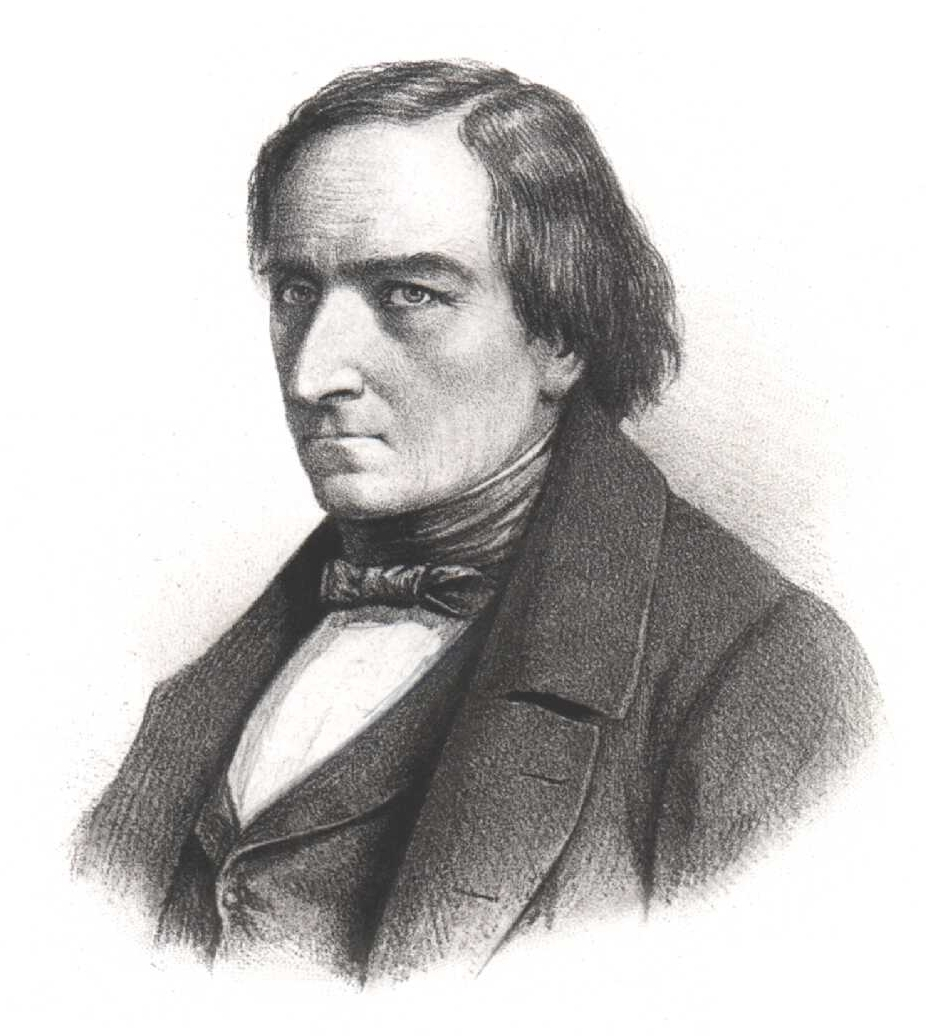
Josef Ressel

- Thomas Feichtner (born 1970), industrial designer
- Anselm Franz (1900–1994), pioneer in jet engine engineering, designed the world's first turbojet
- Gaston Glock (1929–2023), inventor, founder of firearms company GLOCK GmbH
- Eduard Haas (1897–1989), inventor of the Pez candy
- Viktor Kaplan (1876–1934), inventor of turbines for river power plants
- Wilhelm Kress (1836–1913), aviation pioneer, inventor of the stick control for airplanes
- Hedy Lamarr (1914–2000), co-inventor of spread spectrum wireless communications, along with George Antheil
- Ernst Lauda (1859–1932), hydraulic and bridge engineer
- Josef Madersperger (1768–1850), invented the sewing machine in 1818
- Siegfried Marcus (1831–1898), automobile pioneer, inventor of the first gasoline powered automobile (vehicles of 1870 and 1889)
- Alois Negrelli (1799–1858), engineer and railroad pioneer (created the plans for the Suez Canal)
- Ferdinand Porsche (1875–1951), automotive engineer, designed the Volkswagen (the "people's car"), inventor of the hybrid car, contributed to the design of the Tiger I and Tiger II tanks (born in Austria-Hungary)
- Josef Ressel (1793–1857), inventor of the marine screw propeller, pneumatic post and ball bearing
- Theodor Scheimpflug (1865–1911), inventor of Scheimpflug photography
- Alois Senefelder (1771–1834), inventor of the printing technique of lithography
- Josef Singer (1923–2009), Israeli aeronautical engineer and President of Technion – Israel Institute of Technology
- Max Valier (1895–1930), rocketry pioneer
- Carl Auer von Welsbach (1858–1929), inventor of gaslight

=== Philosophers ===
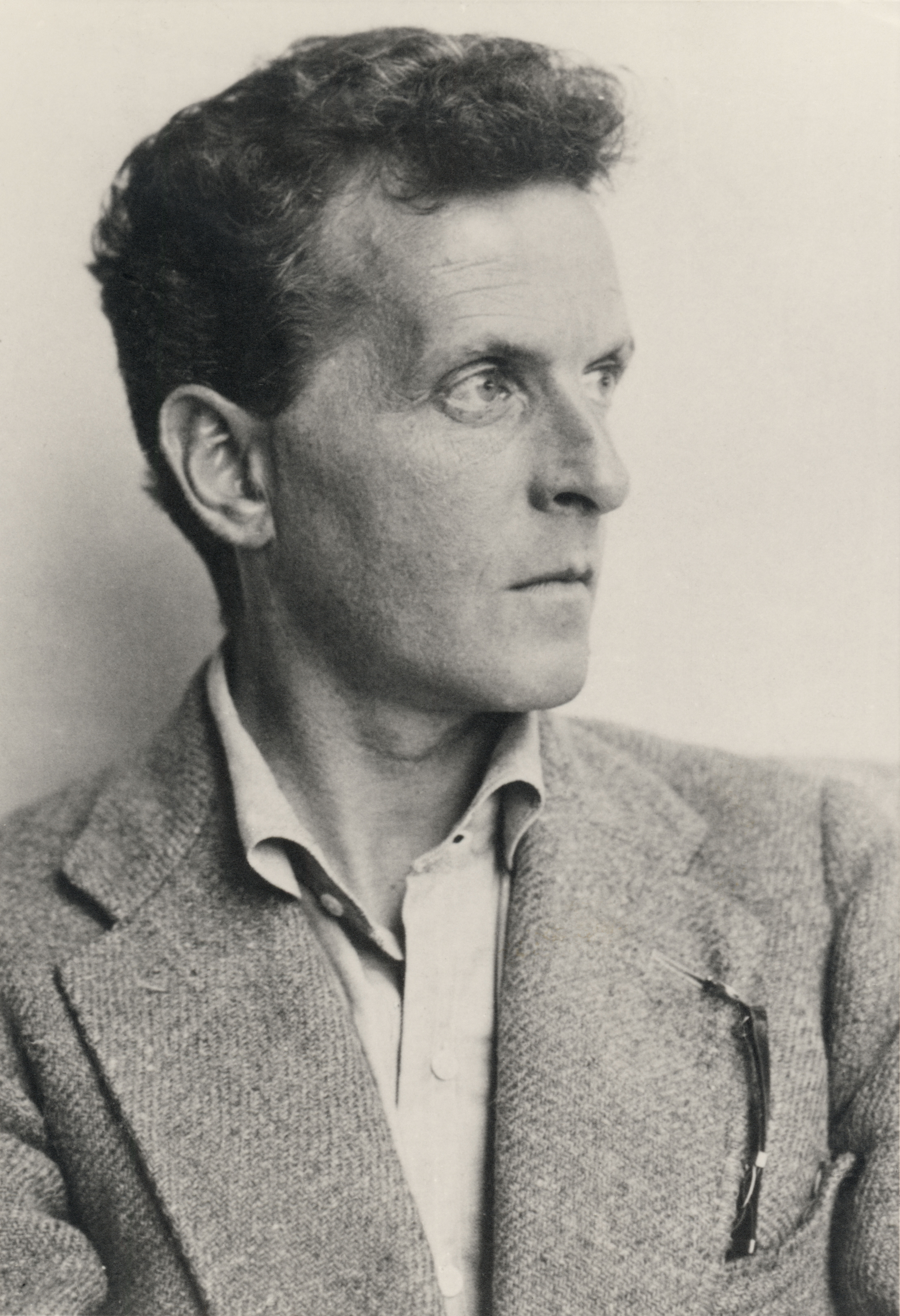
Ludwig Wittgenstein

- Franz Brentano (1838–1917), philosopher and psychologist
- Martin Buber (1878–1965), philosopher
- Christian von Ehrenfels (1859–1932), philosopher
- Herbert Feigl (1902–1988), philosopher (member of the Vienna Circle)
- Paul Feyerabend (1924–1994), philosopher
- Philipp Frank (1884–1966), philosopher and physicist (member of the Vienna Circle)
- Edmund Husserl (1859–1938), philosopher (born in Prossnitz, Austria-Hungary)
- Wilhelm Jerusalem (1854–1923), philosopher, born in Drenitz, died in Vienna
- Hans Köchler (born 1948), philosopher, born in Schwaz
- Georg Kreisel (1923–2015), philosopher and mathematician
- Alexius Meinong (1853–1920), philosopher (theory of objects)
- Otto Neurath (1882–1945), socialist, economist and philosopher
- Karl Popper (1902–1994), philosopher (born in Austria, became British)
- Friedrich Waismann (1896–1959), mathematician, philosopher and physicist (member of the Vienna Circle)
- Otto Weininger (1880–1903), philosopher
- Felix Weltsch (1884–1964), journalist, philosopher, student of Christian von Ehrenfels
- Ludwig Wittgenstein (1889–1951), philosopher, born in Vienna

=== Physicists, mathematicians and chemists ===
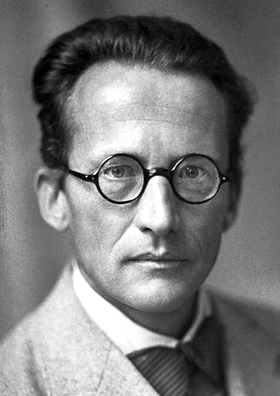
Erwin Schrödinger

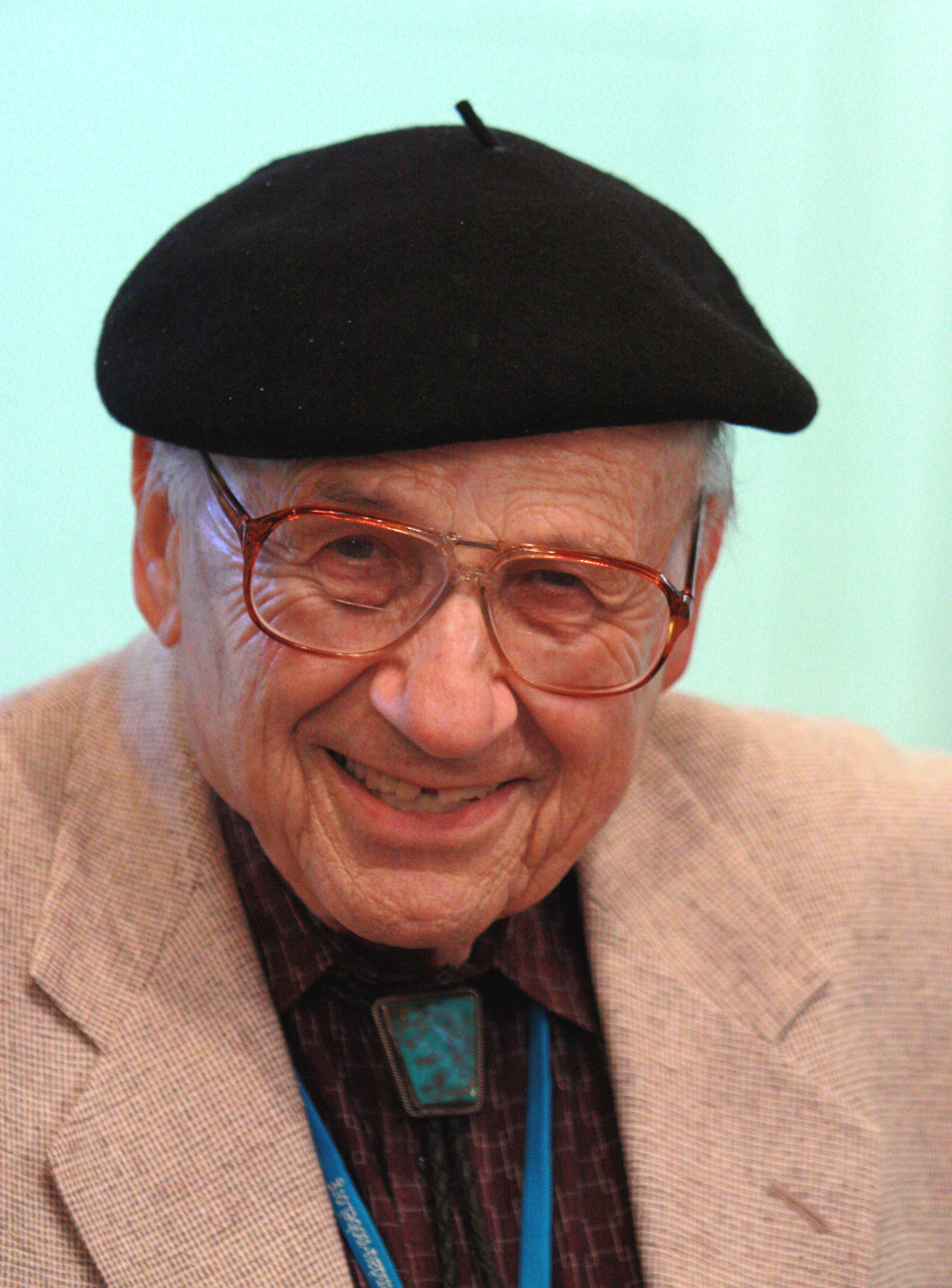
Walter Kohn

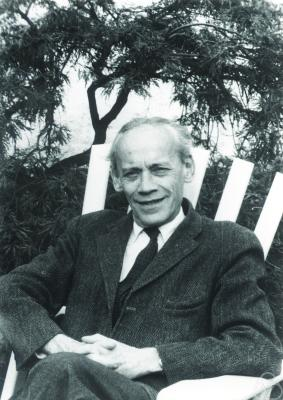
Emil Artin

- Emil Artin (1898–1962), mathematician (Artin's conjecture)
- Ludwig Boltzmann (1844–1906), physicist, born in Vienna (Boltzmann constant)
- Fritjof Capra (born 1939), physicist, born in Vienna
- Carl Cori (1896–1984), born in Prague, Austria-Hungary, biochemist, Nobel Prize in Physiology or Medicine in 1947
- Carl Djerassi (1923-2015), chemist, inventor of the pill
- Christian Doppler (1803–1853), physicist, born in Salzburg (See Doppler effect)
- Paul Ehrenfest (1880–1933), physicist and mathematician
- Felix Ehrenhaft (1879–1952), maverick physicist
- Josef Finger (1841–1925), physicist and mathematician
- Heinz von Foerster (1911–2002), cyberneticist
- Kurt Gödel (1906–1978), mathematician (born in Austria-Hungary, became naturalized U.S. citizen)
- Hans Hahn (1879–1934), mathematician (member of the Vienna Circle)
- Friedrich Hasenöhrl (1874–1915), physicist
- Victor Franz Hess (1883–1964), physicist, Nobel Prize in Physics
- Nikolaus Joseph von Jacquin (1727–1817), chemist
- Walter Kohn (1923–2016), Nobel Prize in Chemistry 1998
- Georg Kreisel (1923–2015), philosopher and mathematician
- Hans Kronberger (1920-1970), nuclear physicist
- Richard Kuhn (1900–1967), chemist, Nobel Prize in Chemistry in 1938
- Robert von Lieben (1878-1913), physicist (Jewish father)
- Johann Josef Loschmidt (1821–1895), physicist and chemist
- Ernst Mach (1838–1916), physicist and philosopher (Mach number)
- Lise Meitner (1878-1968), physicist, discovered nuclear fission of uranium with * Otto Hahn, namegiver of element 109 * meitnerium
- Richard von Mises (1883–1953), physicist (younger brother of Ludwig von Mises)
- John von Neumann (1903–1957), mathematician (Hungarian, Budapest-born)
- Wolfgang Pauli (1900–1958), physicist, Nobel Prize in Physics 1945
- Max Ferdinand Perutz (1914–2002), chemist, Nobel Prize in Chemistry 1962
- Johanna Piesch (1898–1992), physicist, mathematician, pioneer in switching algebra
- Fritz Pregl (1869–1930), chemist, Nobel Prize in Chemistry 1923
- Erwin Schrödinger (1887–1961), physicist, Nobel Prize in Physics
- Heinrich Franz Friedrich Tietze (1880–1964), mathematician
- Leopold Vietoris (1891–2002), mathematician
- Victor Frederick Weisskopf (1908–2002), physicist; during World War II, worked at Los Alamos on the Manhattan Project to develop the atomic bomb; later campaigned against the proliferation of nuclear weapons
- Carl Auer von Welsbach (1858–1929), chemist
- Gernot Zippe (1917–2008), physicist (developed Zippe-type centrifuge to extract uranium-235 for nuclear weapons)
- Richard Adolf Zsigmondy (1865–1929), chemist, Nobel Prize in Chemistry in 1925 (Hungarian origin)

=== Physicians ===
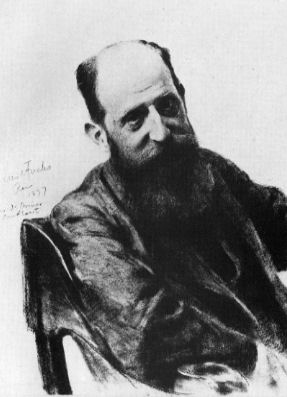
Josef Breuer

- Alfred Adler (1870–1937), psychiatrist, father of Individual Psychology
- Hans Asperger (1906–1980), pediatrician who studied autism, person for whom Asperger syndrome is named
- Leopold Auenbrugger (1722–1809), physician (method of percussion)
- Robert Bárány (1876–1936), physician, Nobel Prize in Physiology or Medicine
- Josef Breuer (1842–1925), physician (forerunner in psychoanalysis)
- Ernst von Fleischl-Marxow (1846–1891), physician and physiologist (studies of nerves and the brain)
- Viktor Frankl (1905–1997), psychiatrist, father of logotherapy
- Sigmund Freud (1856–1939), psychiatrist, father of psychoanalysis
- Karl von Frisch (1886–1982), physician, Nobel Prize in Physiology or Medicine
- Leo Kanner (1894–1981), child psychiatrist
- Helen Singer Kaplan (1929-1995), sex therapist
- Karl Landsteiner (1886–1943), physician, serologist, Nobel Prize in Physiology or Medicine
- Otto Loewi (1873–1961), pharmacologist (born in Germany, but spent 40 years of his life, from age 25, in Austria) Nobel Prize in Physiology or Medicine
- Karol Ignacy Lorinser (1796–1853), physician
- Franz Mesmer (1734–1815), physician, developed an early form of hypnotism
- Paracelsus (1493–1541), (real name: Theophrast von Hohenheim), alchemist and physician
- Clemens von Pirquet (1874–1929), pediatrician and scientist in bacteriology and immunology
- Wilhelm Reich (1897–1957), psychiatrist
- Erwin Ringel (1921–1994), Austrian psychiatrist (presuicidal syndrome)
- Ignaz Semmelweis (1818–1865), physician (born in Hungary, Austria-Hungary)
- Julius Wagner-Jauregg (1857–1940), physician, Nobel Prize in Physiology or Medicine 1927

=== Psychologists ===
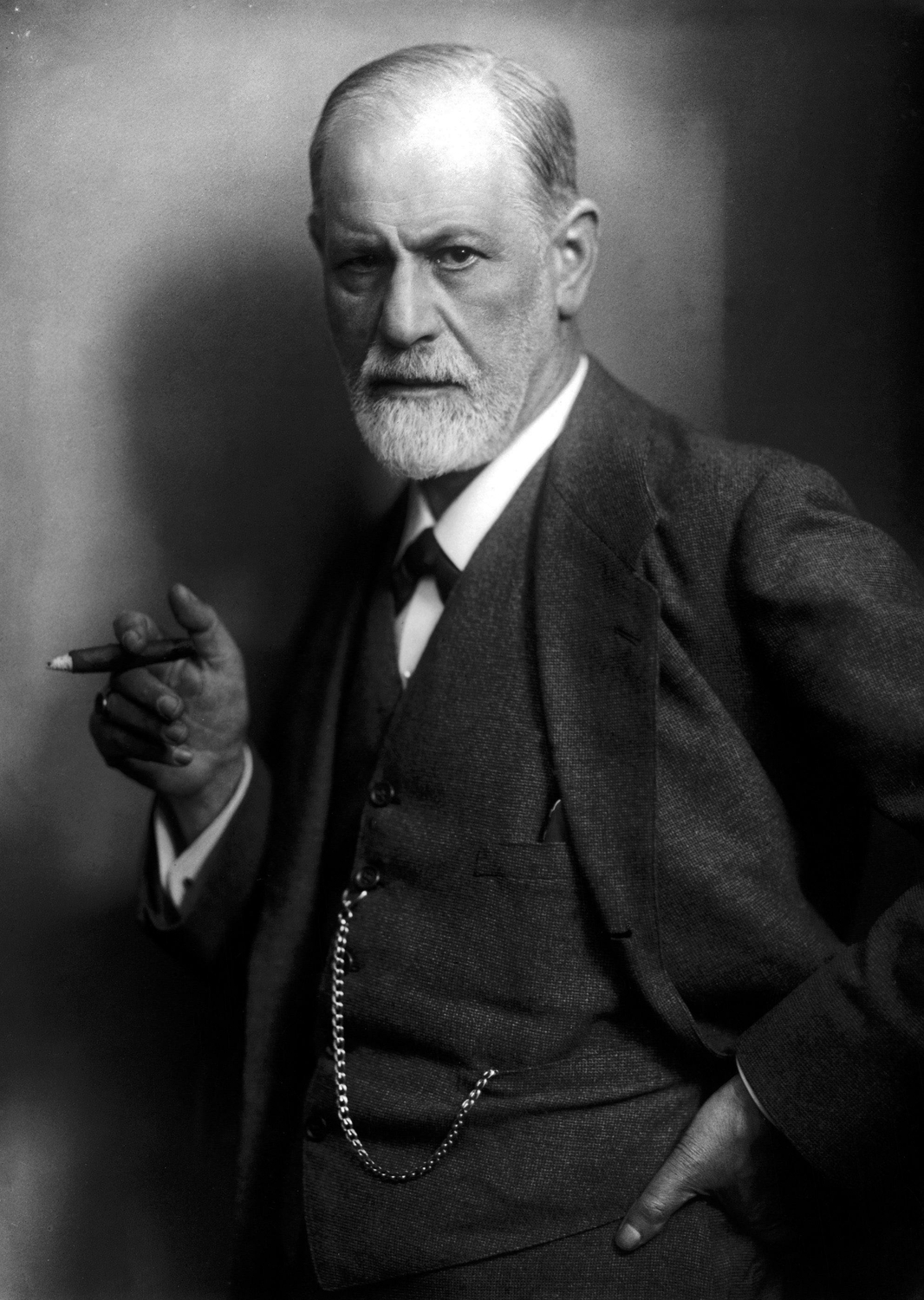
Sigmund Freud

- Alfred Adler (1870-1937), founding member of the Vienna Psychoanalytic Society and founder of the school of individual psychology
- Viktor Frankl (1905-1997), psychiatrist and psychologist
- Anna Freud (1895-1982), Vienna-born child psychologist and daughter of Sigmund Freud
- Sigmund Freud (1856-1939), Moravian-born founder of psychoanalysis and neurologist
- Marie Jahoda (1907-2001), psychologist
- Helen Singer Kaplan (1929-1995), sex therapist
- Melanie Klein (1882-1960), psychotherapy
- Heinz Kohut (1913-1981), psychiatrist and psychoanalyst
- Wilhelm Reich (1897-1957), psychiatry and psychoanalysis
- Paul Watzlawick (1921–2007), communication theory

=== Other scientists ===
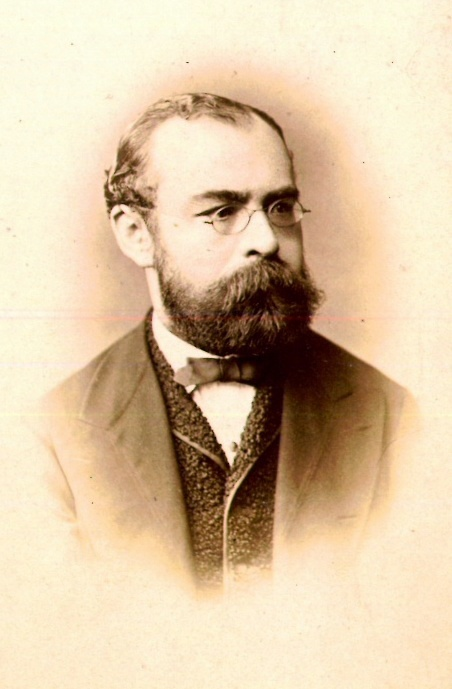
Leo Reinisch

- Othenio Abel (1875–1946), paleontologist
- Karl von Czyhlarz (1833–1914), Czech-Austrian jurist
- Sir Otto Frankel (1900-1998), geneticist
- Martin Gerzabek (born 1961), ecologist and soil scientist
- Helene Gröger-Wurm (1921–2005), Austrian-born Australian ecologist
- Hans Hass (1919–2013), biologist and diving pioneer
- Max Hecker (1879–1964), Austrian-born Israeli President of the Technion – Israel Institute of Technology
- Eric Kandel (born 1929), neuroscientist, winner of 2000 Nobel Prize in Physiology or Medicine
- Hans Kelsen (1881–1973), jurist (father of the Austrian constitution)
- Konrad Lorenz (1903–1989), zoologist, Nobel Prize in Physiology or Medicine
- Gregor Mendel (1822–1884), pioneer of genetics
- Karl Koller (1857-1944), ophthalmologist; first to use cocaine as an anaesthetic
- Julius Pokorny (1887–1970), linguist
- Leo Reinisch (1832–1919), linguist, Africanist and Egyptologist
- Rupert Riedl (1925–2005), zoologist
- Doris Vickers (born 1980), archaeoastronomer
- Maria Wähnl (1908–1989), astronomer

== Sports ==
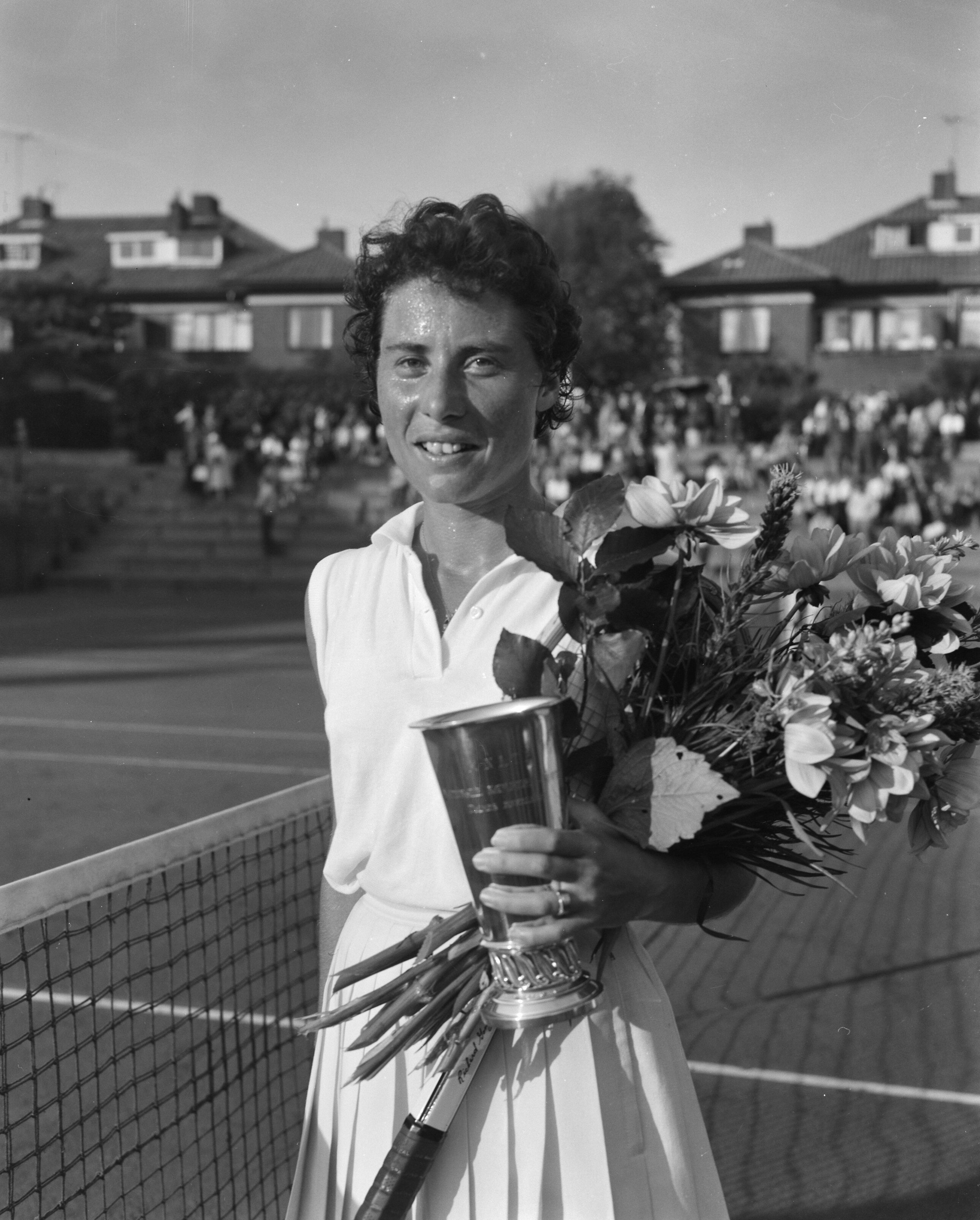
Eva Duldig

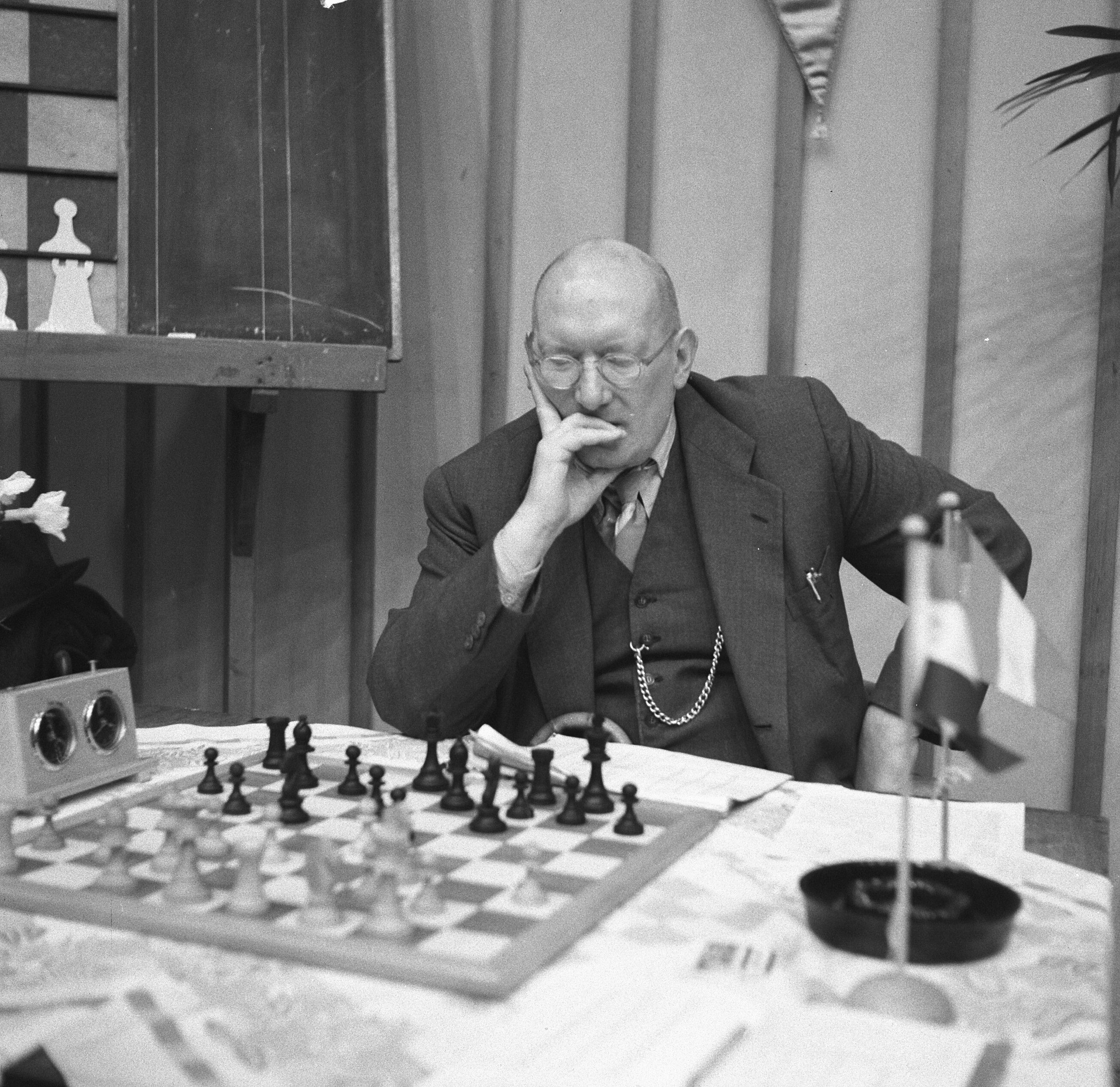
Ernst Grünfeld

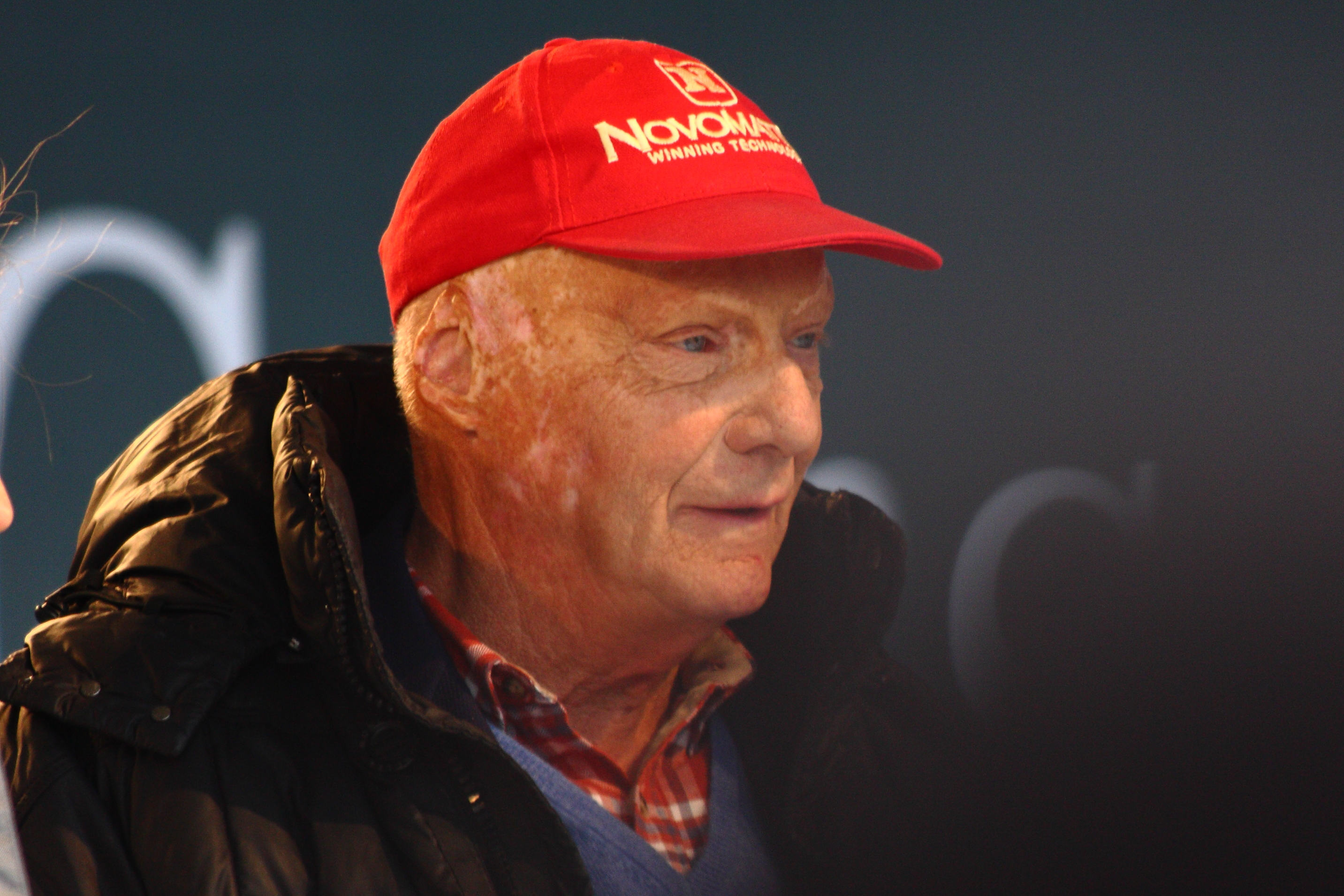
Niki Lauda

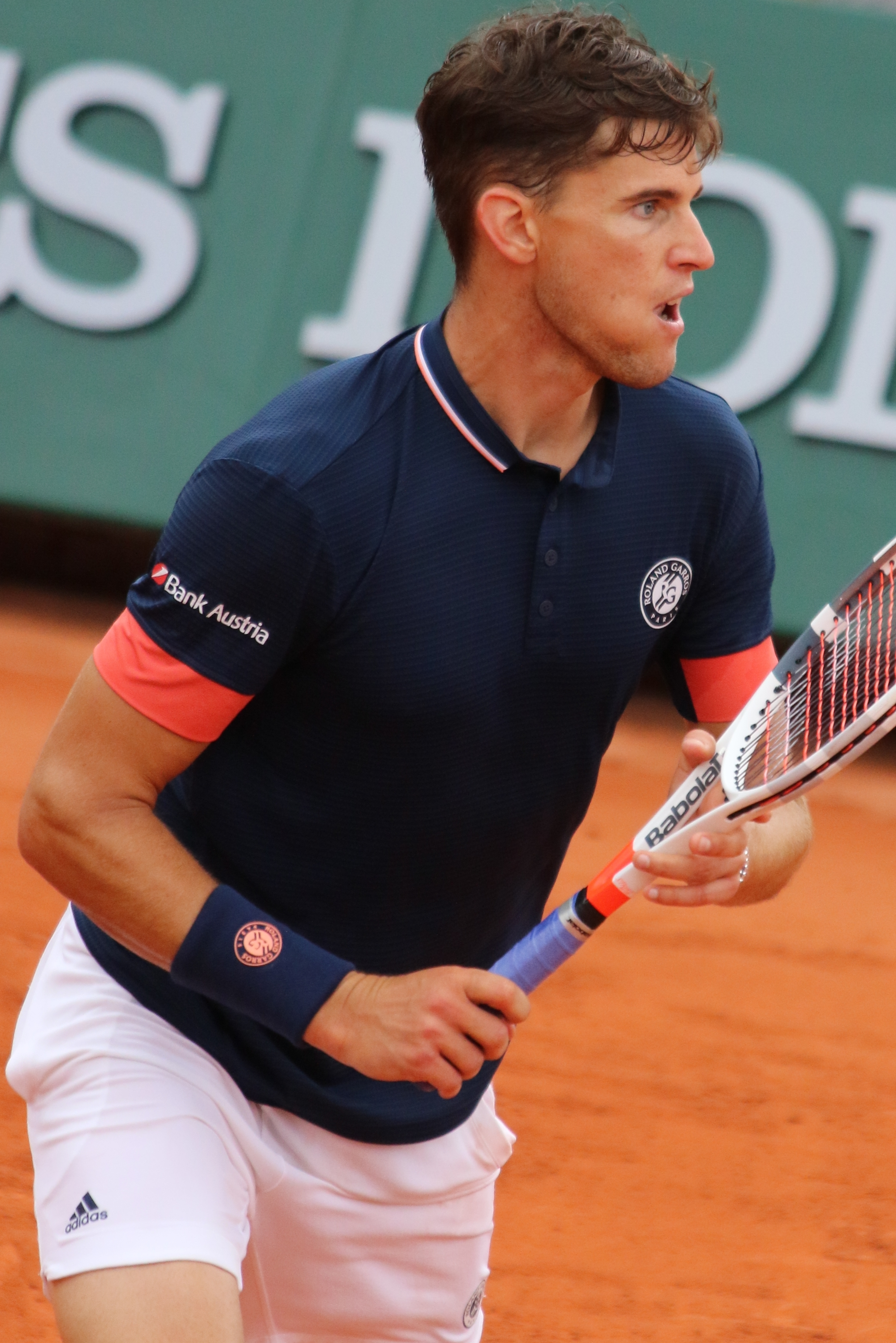
Dominic Thiem

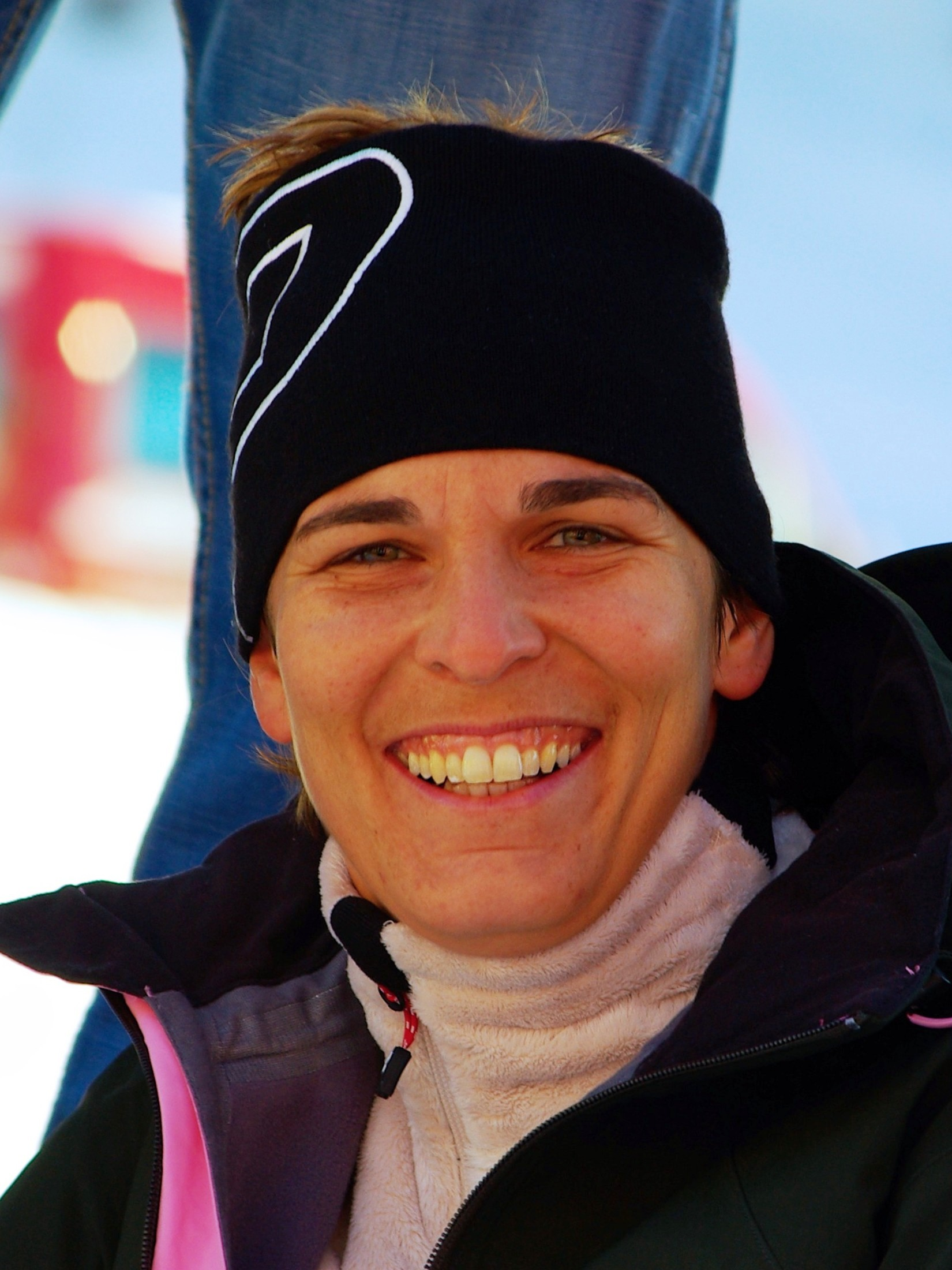
Michaela Dorfmeister

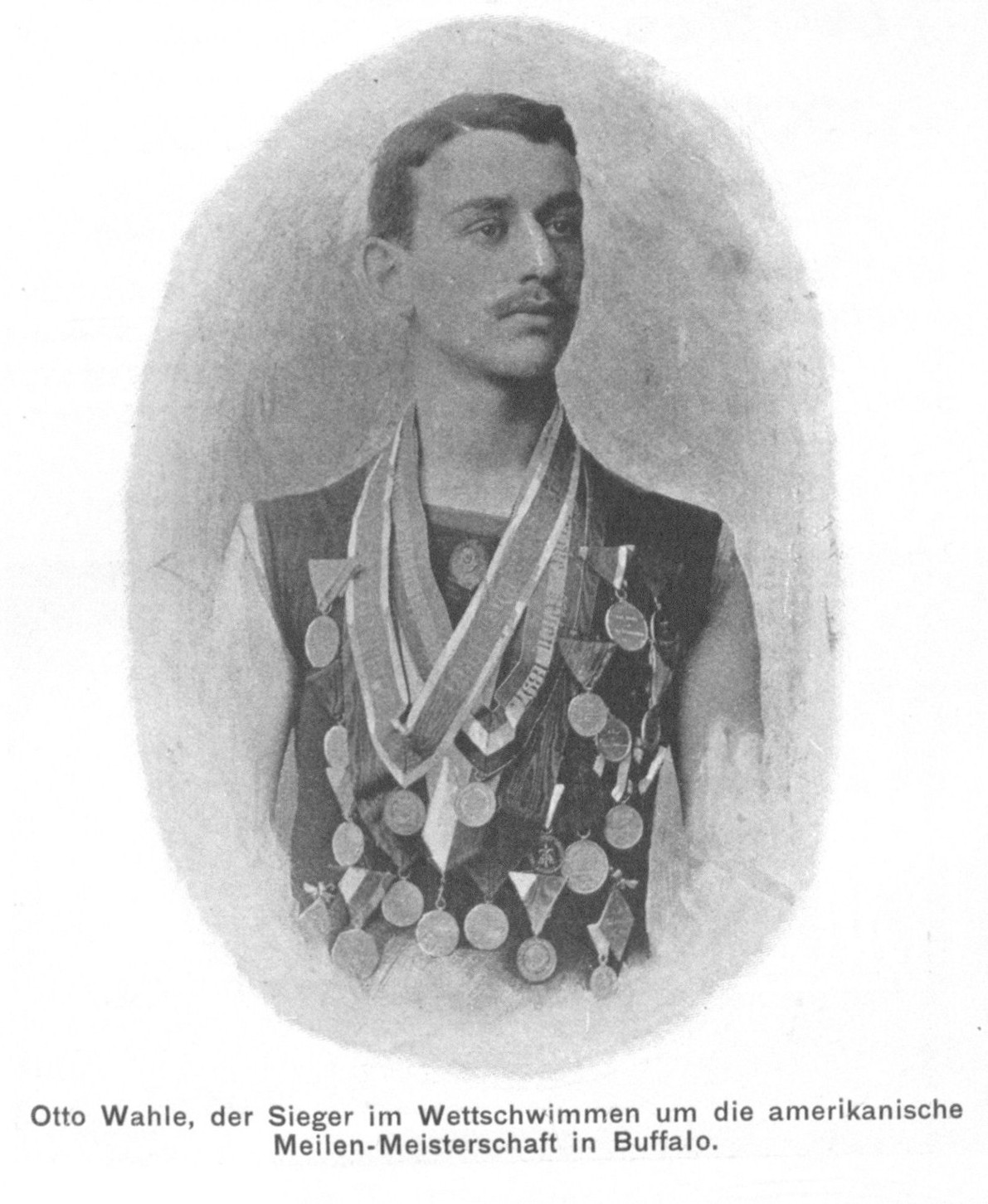
Otto Wahle

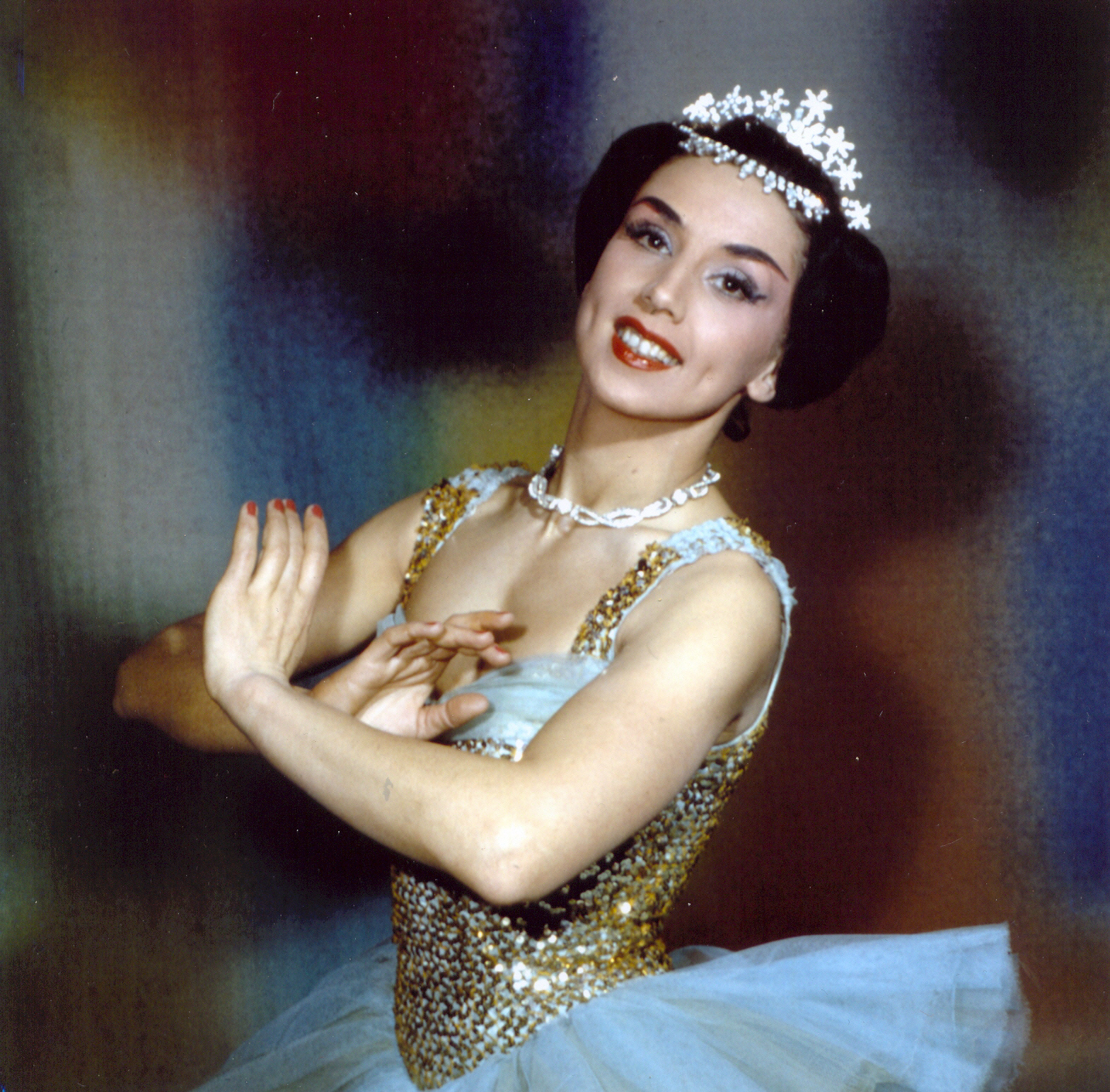
Eva Pawlik

- Margarete Adler (1896–1990), swimmer, Olympic bronze medalist (4x100m freestyle relay)
- David Alaba (born 1992), footballer, winner of 2012–13 UEFA Champions League with FC Bayern Munich
- Felix Baumgartner (1969-2025), world record setting skydiver
- Gerhard Berger (born 1959), racing driver
- Richard Bergmann (1919–1970), seven-time world table tennis champion, ITTF Hall of Fame
- Hedy Bienenfeld (1907–1976), Austrian-American Olympic swimmer
- Albert Bogen (Albert Bógathy) (1882–1961), saber fencer, Olympic silver medalist
- Fritzi Burger (1910–1999), figure skater, two-time Olympic silver medalist, two-time World silver medalist
- Hans Dobida (1929–2025), inductee into the IIHF Hall of Fame
- Michaela Dorfmeister (born 1973), alpine skier
- Eva Duldig (born 1938), Austrian-born Australian and Dutch tennis player, author
- Erich Eliskases (1913–1997), chess grandmaster
- Robert Fein (1907–1975), Olympic Champion weightlifter
- Otto Fischer (1901–1941), footballer and coach
- Siegfried Flesch (1872–1939), sabre fencer, Olympic bronze medalist
- Toni Fritsch (1945–2005), soccer and football player who won the Super Bowl in 1972
- Michael Grabner (born 1987), NHL player
- Ernst Grünfeld (1893–1962), chess grandmaster
- Gunther (wrestler) (born 1987), professional wrestler signed to WWE
- Alfred Guth (1908–1996), Austrian-born American water polo player, swimmer, and Olympic modern pentathlete
- Hans Haas (1906–1973), Olympic champion weightlifter (lightweight), silver medalist
- Tunç Hamarat (born 1946), correspondence chess world champion (2004)
- Ernst Happel (1925–1992), football player and coach
- Judith Haspel (born "Judith Deutsch"; 1918–2004), held every Austrian women's middle and long-distance freestyle record in 1935
- Otto Herschmann (1877–1942), two-time Olympic silver medalist (in saber fencing/team sabre and 100m freestyle)
- Hansi Hinterseer (born 1954), skier, singer, actor, entertainer
- Nickolaus Hirschl (1906–1991), two-time Olympic bronze medalist in wrestling (heavyweight freestyle and Greco-Roman), shot put and discus junior champion, weightlifting junior champion, and pentathlon champion
- Felix Kaspar (1915–2003), figure skater, Olympic bronze medalist
- Veli Kavlak (born 1988), Austrian-Turkish football player
- Malena Kernacs (born 2002), wheel gymnast
- Franz Klammer (born 1953), Olympic alpine ski champion
- Alfred König (1913–1987), Austrian-Turkish Olympic sprinter
- Hans Krankl (born 1953), football player and coach
- Ruth Langer (1921–1999), Austrian national champion swimmer who refused to attend the 1936 Summer Olympics, along with Judith Haspel and Lucie Goldner
- Niki Lauda (1949–2019), Formula One race car driver and aviation entrepreneur
- Fritzi Löwy (1910–1994), Austrian Olympic swimmer
- Hermann Maier (born 1972), Olympic alpine ski champion
- Alex Manninger (1977–2026), professional footballer for Arsenal F.C., winner of 1997–98 FA Premier League title
- Helmut Marko (1943–), former driver and current advisor to Red Bull Racing
- Klara Milch (born 1970), swimmer, Olympic bronze medalist (4x100m freestyle relay)
- Uberto De Morpurgo (1896–1961), Austrian-born Italian tennis player
- Annemarie Moser-Pröll (born 1953), alpine skier
- Thomas Muster (born 1967), tennis champion
- Paul Neumann (1875–1932), Olympic champion swimmer (500m freestyle)
- Fred Oberlander (born 1996), wrestler; world champion (freestyle heavyweight); Maccabiah champion
- Eva Pawlik (1927–1983), European figure skating Champion, World and Olympic runner-up, show star, actress, the world's first female sports commentator on TV (from 1962–1972)
- Felix Pipes (1887–1983), tennis player, Olympic silver medalist (doubles)
- Maxim Podoprigora (born 1978), Olympic swimmer
- Jakob Pöltl (born 1995), basketball player; played two seasons of U.S. college basketball at Utah before declaring for the 2016 NBA draft
- Ellen Preis (1912–2007), foil fencer, three-time world champion (1947, 1949, and 1950), Olympic champion, 17-time Austrian champion
- Herbert Prohaska (born 1955), football player and coach
- Roland Ratzenberger (1960–1994), race car driver, Formula One driver
- Jochen Rindt (1942–1970), race car driver, 1970 Formula One World Champion (posthumous)
- Marcel Sabitzer (born 1994), footballer
- Toni Sailer (1935–2009), Alpine skier, earned the Triple Crown of Alpine Skiing (by winning all three gold medals) at 1956 Olympic Games
- Otto Scheff (born "Otto Sochaczewsky"; 1889–1956), Olympic champion swimmer (400m freestyle) and two-time bronze medalist (400m freestyle, 1,500m freestyle)
- Max Scheuer (1895–1941), footballer; national team
- Werner Schlager (born 1972), 2003 Table Tennis World Champion
- Carl Schlechter (1874–1918), chess grandmaster
- Gregor Schlierenzauer (born 1990), ski jumper, Olympic bronze medalist, World and 4 Hills Tournament champion
- Heinrich Schönfeld (1900–1976), football player
- Matthias Sindelar (1903–1939), footballer
- Wilhelm Steinitz (1836–1900), winner of first-ever world chess championship in 1886
- Josephine Sticker (1894–1963), swimmer, Olympic bronze medalist (4x100m freestyle relay)
- Rudolf Spielmann (1883–1942), chess grandmaster
- Herma Szabo (1902–1986), Olympic and five-time World figure skating champion
- Dominic Thiem (born 1993), top-20 tennis player and Grand Slam Champion (Men's Singles, US Open 2020)
- Nicole Trimmel (born 1982), kickboxing champion
- Thomas Vanek (born 1984), NHL hockey player for the Montreal Canadiens
- Anita Wachter (born 1967 in Schruns), Olympic alpine ski champion
- Otto Wahle (1879–1963), swimmer, two-time Olympic silver medalist (1,000m freestyle, 200m obstacle race) and Olympic bronze medalist (400m freestyle); inducted into International Swimming Hall of Fame
- Walter Wasservogel (1919–1993), inductee into the IIHF Hall of Fame
- Toto Wolff (1972–), motorsport executive, currently team principal of Mercedes-Benz

== Writers ==
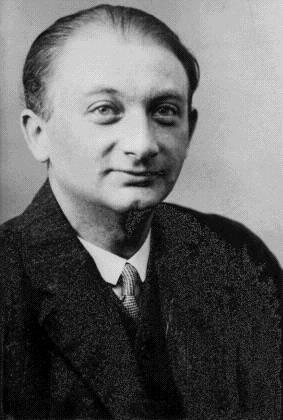
Joseph Roth

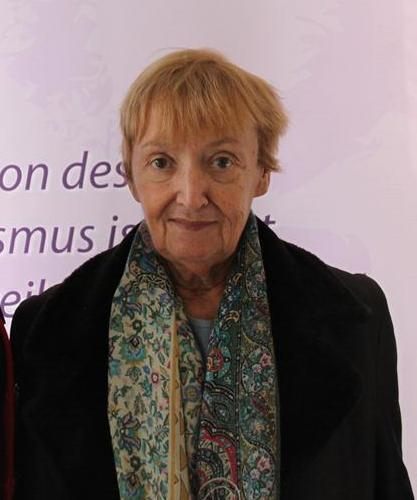
Christine Nöstlinger

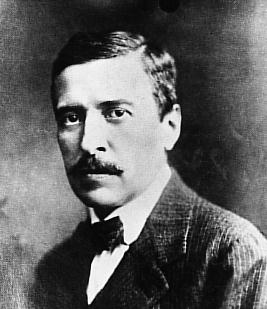
Hugo von Hofmannsthal

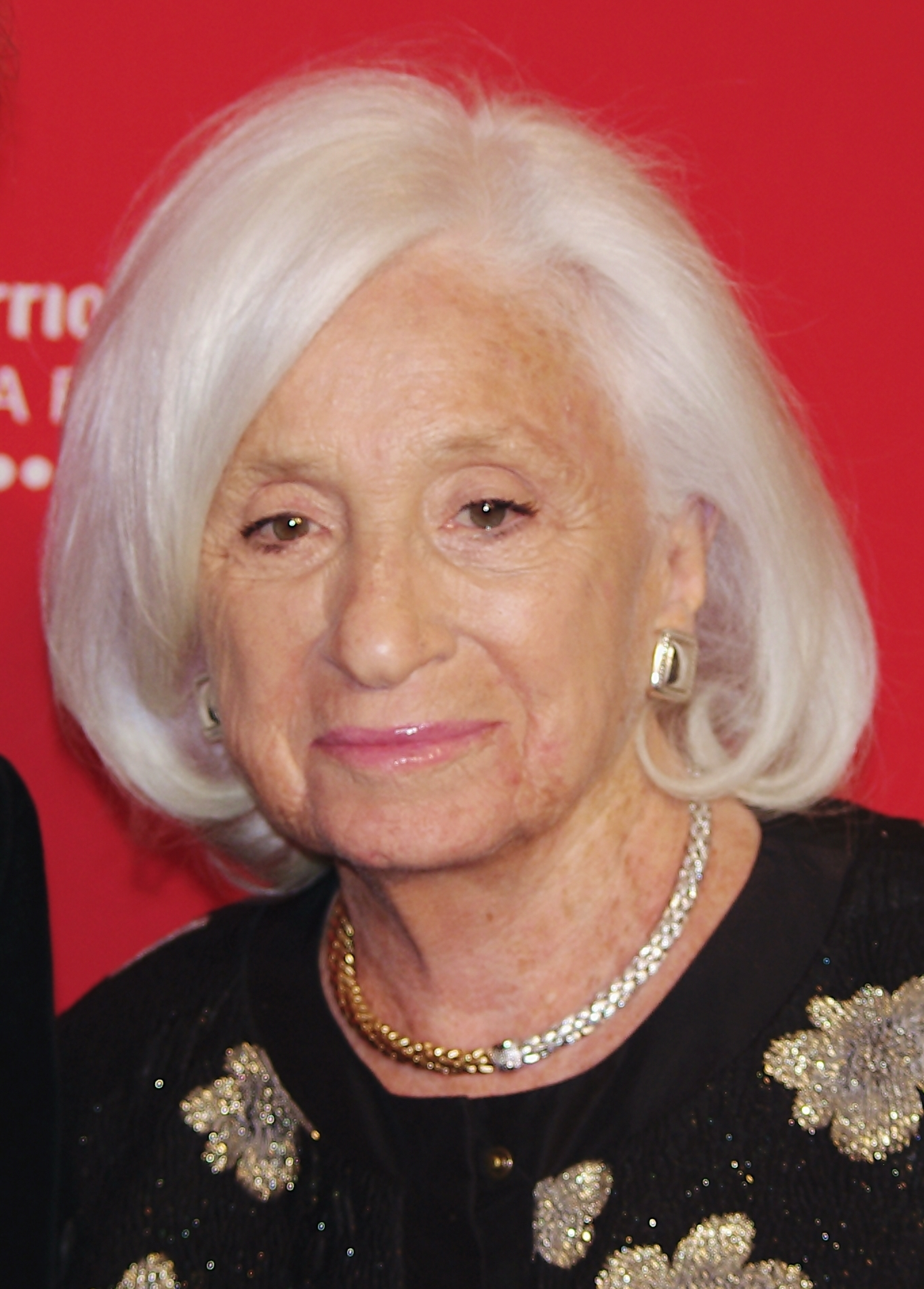
Marion Wiesel

- Ingeborg Bachmann (1926–1973), poet
- Hermann Bahr (1863–1934), playwright, novelist
- Ludwig Bemelmans (1898–1962), author of the Madeline books
- Thomas Bernhard (1931–1989), dramatist, novelist, poet, born in Cloister Heerlen, Netherlands
- Hermann Broch (1886–1951), novelist
- Max Brod (1884–1968), writer, born in Prague, Austria-Hungary, (Bohemia, present-day Czech Republic), wrote in German
- Heimito von Doderer (1896–1966), writer, born in Hadersdorf-Weidlingau near Vienna
- Marie von Ebner-Eschenbach (1830–1916), writer (style: psychological novelist)
- Franz Grillparzer (1791–1872), poet, Vienna
- Robert Hamerling (1830–1889), poet
- Peter Handke (born 1942), author, born in Griffen (Carinthia)
- Hugo von Hofmannsthal (1874–1929), dramatist, writer
- Martin Horváth (born 1967), writer
- Franz Kafka (1883–1924), novelist, born in Prague, Austria-Hungary
- Marie-Thérèse Kerschbaumer (born 1936), novelist, poet
- Werner Kofler (1947–2011), novelist and dramatist
- Karl Gottfried Ritter von Leitner (1800–1890), poet, writer, born in Graz
- Alexander Lernet-Holenia (1897–1976), novelist, poet, dramatist, critic
- Olga Misař (1876–1950), peace activist, feminist, writer
- Robert Musil (1880–1942), writer
- Johann Nestroy (1801–1862), playwright
- Christine Nöstlinger (1936–2018), writer (especially literature for children)
- Ferdinand Raimund (1790–1836), writer and dramatist
- Christoph Ransmayr (born 1954), writer
- Rainer Maria Rilke (1875–1926), poet and novelist, born in Prague, (Bohemia, present-day Czech Republic)
- Peter Rosegger (1843–1918), writer, teacher & Styrian hero and visionary
- Joseph Roth (1894–1939), novelist
- Arthur Schnitzler (1862–1931), novelist and playwright
- Adalbert Stifter (1805–1868), poet and artist
- Bertha von Suttner (1843–1914), writer and pacifist Nobel Peace Prize winner, born in Prague, (Bohemia, present-day Czech Republic)
- Georg Trakl (1887–1914), poet
- Josef Weinheber (1892–1945), poet and essayist
- Marion Wiesel (born Mary Renate Erster; 1931–2025), Austrian-American Holocaust survivor, humanitarian, writer, and translator

== People of the Nazi Party and regime ==
=== Critics of the Nazi Regime ===
- Steffi Kunke (1908–1942), Austrian teacher and anti-fascist activist
- Stefan Zweig (1881–1942), novelist and playwright

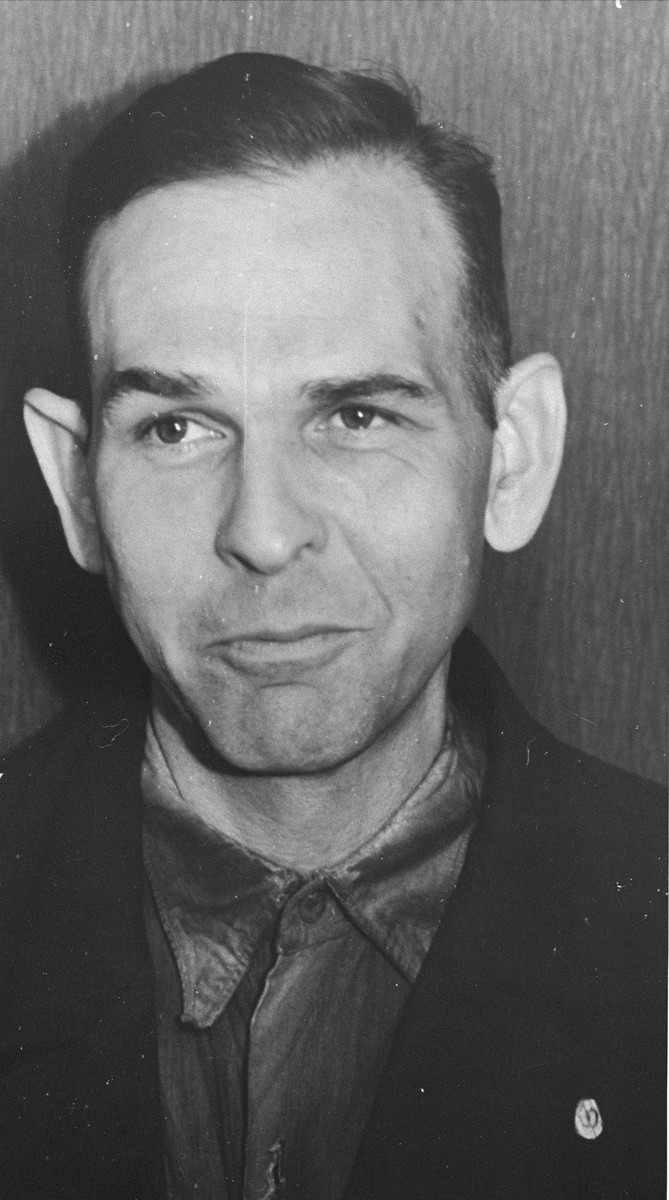
Amon Göth

=== Nazis ===
- Amon Göth (1908–1946), commandant of the Kraków-Płaszów concentration camp and executed Nazi war criminal
- Aribert Heim (1914–1992), physician ("Dr. Death") in the Mauthausen concentration camp
- Adolf Hitler (1889–1945), leader of the Nazi Party and Nazi Germany
- Ernst Kaltenbrunner (1903–1946), high ranking SS officer and Nazi war criminal
- Arthur Seyss-Inquart (1892–1946), Reich Commissioner of the Netherlands

== Other notables ==
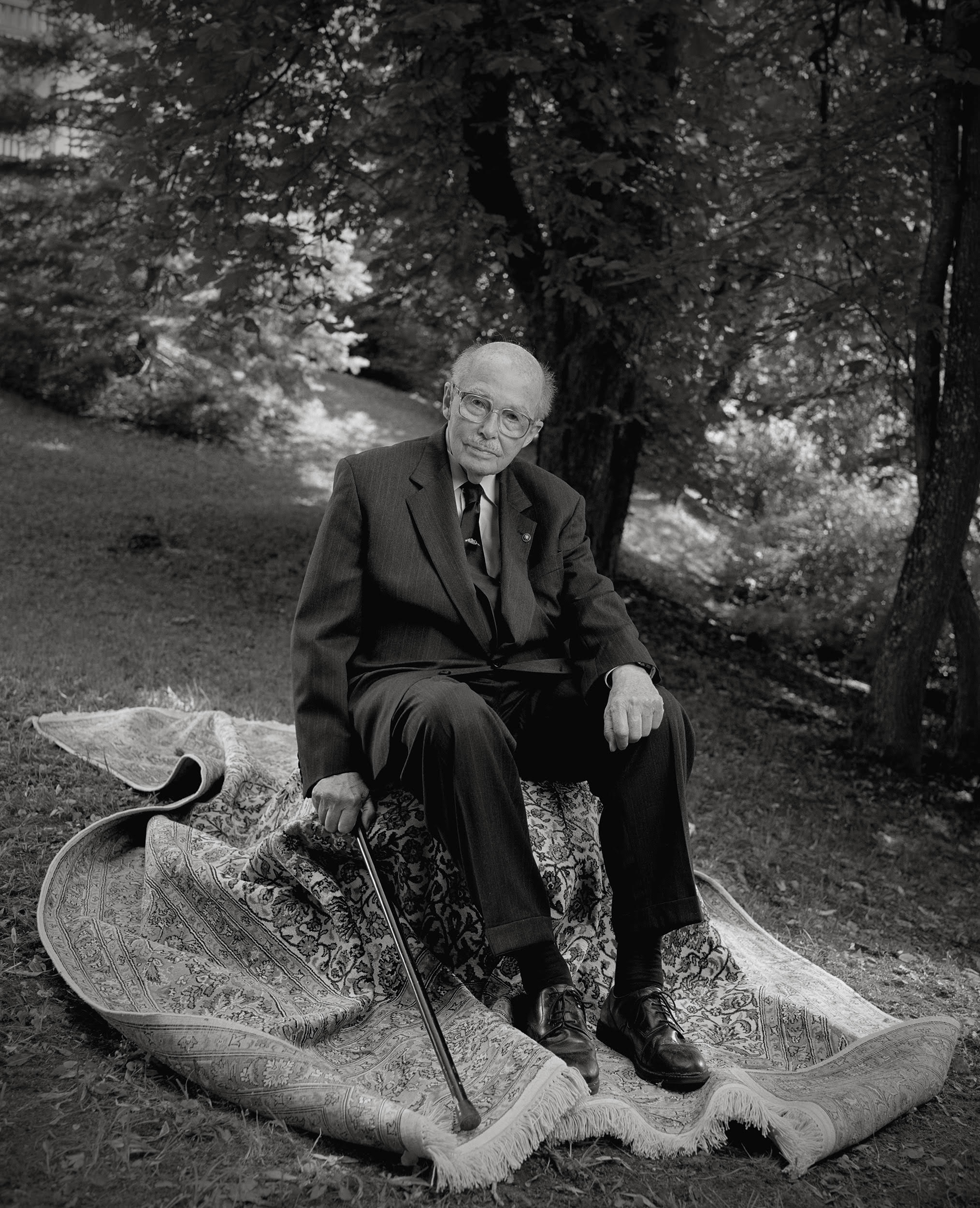
Otto von Habsburg

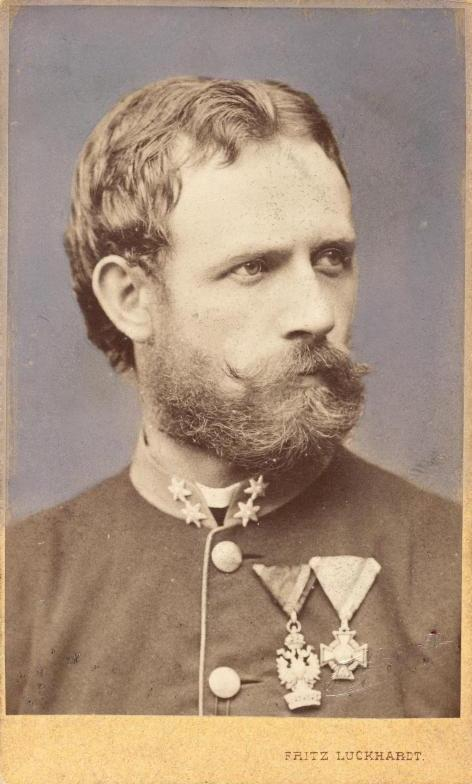
Julius von Payer

- Maria Altmann (1916–2011), niece of Adele Bloch-Bauer
- Oscar Baumann (1864–1899), explored the interior of German East Africa (present-day Tanzania, Rwanda and Burundi)
- Angelica Bäumer (1932–2025), art critic and art historian
- Robert Bernardis (1908–1944), resistance fighter during WW2 (July 20 Plot)
- Edward Bernays (1891–1995), Austrian-American pioneer in public relations, referred to in his obituary as "the father of public relations"
- Adele Bloch-Bauer (1881–1925), subject of famous painting by Gustav Klimt
- Josefine Brunner (1909–1943), socialist, resistance member and victim of the Nazi regime
- Josef Fritzl (born 1935), notorious rapist
- Hugo Haberfeld (1875–1946), Jewish art dealer and gallery owner
- Otto von Habsburg (1912–2011), politician, writer, heir to the thrones of Austria-Hungary
- Theodor Herzl (1860–1904), founder of the ideology of Zionism, lived most of his life in Austria
- Alois Hitler (1837–1903), father of Adolf Hitler
- Klara Hitler (1860–1907), mother of Adolf Hitler
- Andreas Hofer (1767–1810), Tyrolian freedom fighter (against Napoleon)
- Sylvie di Giusto, professional Speaker, Consultant and Author
- Heinrich Kanner (1864–1930), journalist and editor of the newspaper "Die Zeit" in the k.u.k. Monarchy
- Alma Mahler (1879–1964), wife and muse to Mahler, Gropius, Werfel
- Andreas Maislinger (born 1955), founder of the Austrian Holocaust Memorial Service
- Erna Patak (1871–1955), Zionist, social worker
- Julius von Payer (1841–1915), polar explorer
- Wolfgang Puck (born 1949), celebrity chef and restaurateur
- Max Reinhardt (1873–1943), renowned theatre director
- Sister Maria Restituta (1894–1943), nun and nurse murdered by the Nazis
- Günther Schifter (1923–2008), radio personality
- Oskar Schindler (1908–1974), industrialist and famous World War II hero (saved his Jewish factory workers from Auschwitz), born in Svitavy, Moravia
- Otto Skorzeny (1908–1975), Nazi commando (rescuer of Benito Mussolini)
- Wolfgang Streitenberger (born 1952), European Commission senior official
- Carl Szokoll (1915–2004), resistance fighter ("saviour of Vienna"), author and film producer
- Georg Ludwig von Trapp (1880–1947), head of The Sound of Music family
- Franz Viehböck (born 1960), cosmonaut
- Hede von Trapp (1877–1947), painter artist
- Karl Weyprecht (1838–1881), polar explorer
- Simon Wiesenthal (1908–2005), pre-eminent Nazi hunter
- Walter Wolf (born 1939), business person

== See also ==
- List of Austrian Jews
- List of Austrian inventors and discoverers
- List of Germans
- List of Slovenians
- List of Hungarians
- List of Croatians
- List of Serbs
- List of Czechs
- List of Slovaks
- List of Poles
- List of Swiss
- List of people by nationality
