= Esmann =

Esmann is a surname, likely of Danish origin. Notable people with the surname include:

- Amir Esmann (born 1965), Swiss cinematographer
- Frank Esmann (1939–2016), Danish journalist
- Gustav Esmann (1860–1904), Danish journalist, author, scriptwriter, and master of ceremonies
