= Werner Kofler =

Austrian novelist (1947–2011)

- Born: 23 July 1947; Villach, Carinthia, Austria
- Died: 8 December 2011 (aged 64); Vienna, Austria
- Occupation: Novelist. Playwright
- Writing career
- Literary movement: postmodernism

Werner Kofler (23 July 1947 – 8 December 2011) was an Austrian novelist was born in Villach, Austria, and died in Vienna.

== Life ==
Werner Kofler was the son of a merchant. He broke off his teacher training at the teacher training college in Klagenfurt after four years and went travelling. Afterwards he practised various activities. From 1963 on he was engaged in literary activities; since 1968 he lived as a writer in his chosen home-town Vienna.

== Works (in translation) ==
- At the Writing Desk, translated by Lauren K. Wolfe (2016)

== See also ==
- List of Austrian writers
- List of Austrians
