= Wolfgang Streitenberger =

Wolfgang Streitenberger (born 2 January 1952 in Vienna, Austria) was a senior official of the European Commission, Brussels. He is an Austrian citizen and worked there until his retirement in January 2017 as a senior Advisor in the Directorate General "Regional and Urban Policy".

== Life ==
He studied at Vienna University and at the Sorbonne University, Paris and finished Economics with a M.A. in 1974 and Political Sciences with a PhD in 1975. 1975/76 he attended the College of Europe, Bruges, Belgium, studying "Economics of European Integration". 1976 till 1980 Streitenberger worked as economic researcher at the then-largest Austrian bank, the Creditanstalt-Bankverein. 1981–1984 he was economic editor at the public Austrian television ORF. 1985–1989 he was responsible for media policy and corporate planning in the Directorate General of the Austrian television and broadcasting ORF. 1990 he moved to EXPO VIENNA AG Vienna world exposition company which prepared the twin city world exposition Vienna-Budapest planned for 1995. There he was director for public affairs and spokesperson. Just before the project for this world exposition was stopped by a popular vote in Vienna Wolfgang Streitenberger moved to the Lower Austrian capital city planning corporation in St. Pölten. This corporation planned the development of St. Pölten into a capital of the federal state Lower Austria and also constructed its new cultural and governmental buildings. He was member of the board and responsible for communications, innovation, marketing till end 1994. 1996 Streitenberger was nominated official of the European Commission and entrusted with the post of Head of the European Commission Representation to Austria.

He held this post 6 years till end 2001 and was regularly moved to the European Commission headquarters in Brussels.

In 2002 he worked as an Adviser-Conseiller in Directorate General "Communications", 2003–2010 he was a senior Adviser-Conseiller of the Director General "Information Society and Media", where he dealt with support and promotion for R&D in information and communication technologies.

From 2011 until his retirement in January 2017 he was a senior Adviser-Conseiller in Directorate General "Regional and Urban Policy". In this function he holds numerous speeches all over Europe explaining the EU Regional Policy.

== Works ==
As an editor at the economic news desk of the Austrian public TV ORF between 1981 and 1984 he made many contributions to the prime time news programs "Zeit im Bild" and to the economic journal "Schilling", focusing on international finance, banking, development economics. 1987 till 1994 Wolfgang Streitenberger also acted as TV moderator and regularly led TV discussion programs (the one-hour discussions called "Nachtstudio") in the Austrian public TV ORF. He focused on economics, sociology, politics and history. As side activity Streitenberger published numerous articles in several print media like the economic journals "A3-Volt" and "Economy". 1991 till 1994 he acted as editor in chief of the quarterly journal "Stadt im Land". Later, as Head of the EU Representation to Austria, he was for six years editor in chief of the monthly journals "EU Direkt" and the quarterliy "Die Union".

Streitenberger wrote and published the following books:

Die Geburt Europas, Orac, Wien 1989, ISBN 3-7015-0189-0.

Europastadt St. Pölten, St. Pölten 1992.

Botschafter im eigenen Land, BoD, Norderstedt 2013, ISBN 978-3-7322-5431-6.

as editor: Österreichs Zukunft ist Europa, Signum, Wien 1997, ISBN 3-85436-223-4.

Wolfgang Streitenberger was and is regularly active also as lecturer. 1995–1996 at the Werbeakademie Wien (Academy for Public Affairs) as well as at the Wirtschaftsförderungsinstitute (Business promotion institute) St. Pölten and Linz. 1999–2008 he annually held a Doctoral seminar on European Integration at the Vienna University. 2007–2011 he was lecturer for History of European Integration at the Hoogeschool en Universiteit van Brussel, 2010-2016 he was lecturer on several subjects of "Public Diplomacy" at the "International School for Protocol and Diplomacy" ISPD in Brussels. In his retirement he takes over consultancy work and lecturing related to EU-policies and EU-institutions, in particular EU-regional policy.

Wolfgang Streitenberger is member of a Rotary Club since 1995 and was president of his Club in 2007/2008.

== Awards ==
2003 Grosses Goldenes Ehrenzeichen mit dem Stern für Verdienste um die Republik Österreich (= Grand Decoration of Honour in Gold with Star for Services to the Republic of Austria), 2003.

2015 Honorary title "Professor" awarded by the President of Austria and the Minister of Education, for his long-standing public information and communication activities by speeches and publications and by lecturing about the European Union and its policies and institutions.
