= Johann Georg Danninger =

Austrian sculptor

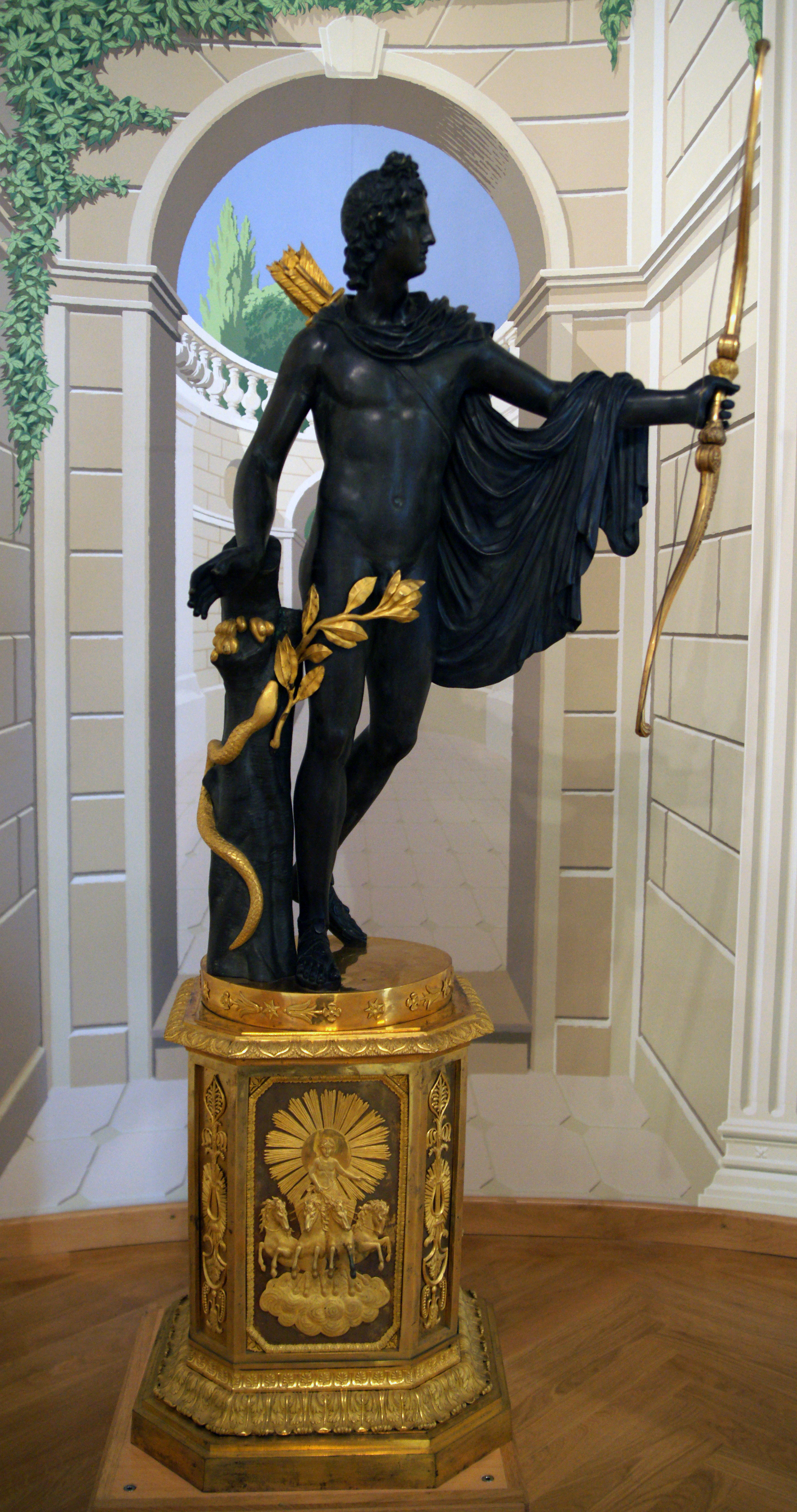
Bronze statue of Apollo by Danninger, bought by the court in 1844

Johann Georg Danninger (died 1848) was an Austrian bronzesmith, known for making many of the bronze items that decorated the Viennese court of the Austrian Empire in the 19th century.

Danninger had made items for the court since 1801 and received the court commission (Hoftitel) in 1811. He made mirror fittings and decorative items for the court. By the 1840s, he was heavily indebted, which he attributed to increasing foreign competition and the burden of having to care for his mentally ill son. In 1844, Emperor Francis I agreed to buy a centrepiece from Danninger in order to save his business from imminent bankruptcy. Nonetheless, Danninger's house and business were sold at auction prior to his death in 1848, and were likely taken over by the originally English firm of John Morton und Sohn.
