= Erna Patak =

Austrian Zionist

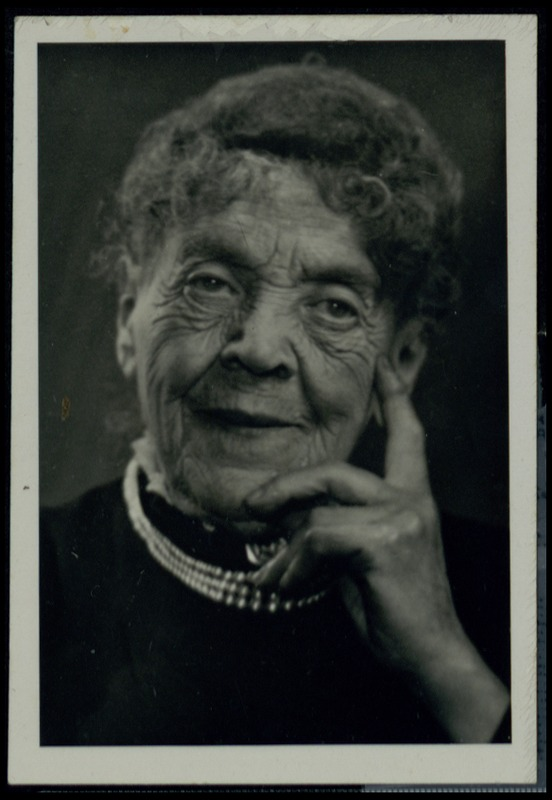
Erna Patak, Tel Aviv, 1953

Erna (Ernestine) Patak (4 November 1871–19 April 1955) was an Austrian Zionist, social worker, women's activist and politician. In the early 1920s, she became the first president of the Austrian branch of the Women's International Zionist Organization. In 1942, she was sent to the Theresienstadt concentration camp but was able to survive and returned to Vienna in 1945. She later immigrated to Israel.
