= Maria Auböck =

Austrian landscape architect

- Born: 20 June 1951 (age 75); Vienna
- Education: Vienna University of Technology; Technical University of Munich
- Occupation: Architect
- Awards: Silbernes Ehrenzeichen
- Practice: Auböck + Kárász; Academy of Fine Arts, Munich

Maria Auböck (born 1951) is an Austrian landscape architect and educator. In 1985, she opened her own firm where, since 1987, she has been working together with János Kárász.

== Biography ==
Born in Vienna on 20 June 1951, Auböck is the daughter of the Austrian industrial designer and architect Carl Auböck (1924–1993), who was himself the son of the designer and painter Carl Auböck (1900–1957). She studied architecture at the Vienna University of Technology, specializing in urban development. Thereafter, she attended the Technical University of Munich on a research grant.

From 1985 to 2000, Auböck lectured on garden and landscape architecture at the Vienna University of Technology as well as in Innsbruck and Munich. Since 1999, she has been a professor at the Academy of Fine Arts, Munich, specializing in landscape architecture and outdoor design. In 1985, she founded her own studio in Vienna, where she was joined by János Kárász in 1987. Now known as Auböck + Kárász, the firm provides architectural services in the areas of open-space planning, parks, historic gardens and outdoor urban design and renovation.

Auböck is executive vice-president of the professional organization Zentralvereinigung der Architekten Österreichs (Central Association of Austrian Architects). She is also associated with the Vier Generationen Werkstätte – Carl Auböck (Four Generation Workshops - Carl Auböck) in the Neubau district of Vienna, where "Vienna Bronzes" were produced from 1926. Today the firm specializes in smoking and writing accessories, items for leather and horn collections and sculptures.

== Awards ==
In 2015, Maria Auböck received the Silbernes Ehrenzeichen für Verdienste um das Land Wien (Silver Medal for Services to the City of Vienna).

== Selected publications ==
- Auböck, Maria (2003). Das Belvedere: der Garten des Prinzen Eugen in Wien. Holzhausen. ISBN 978-3-85493-070-9.
- Auböck, Maria (1975). Die Gärten der Wiener. Jugend u. Volk.
- Auböck, Maria; Hagmüller, Roland (1986). Handbuch für Wiener Kleingärtner. Magistrat, Magistratsabt. 19. ISBN 978-3-85439-021-3.
