= Amir Esmann =

Amir Esmann (born 1965 in Zürich) is a Director of Photography in Austria, known for his association with multiple television and media companies. His productions as a Frontline Cameraman in former Yugoslavia are most recognized by his peers, and in addition to other commendations, Esmann received the Dr.-Karl-Renner-Publizistikpreis, a journalist achievement award in Austria.

Esmann has led several pop documentaries for artists such as Whitney Houston and Jean Paul Gaultier. He worked as cameraman for the documentary on Whitney Houston, Whitney: Can I Be Me. During the days of the Shah, Esmann would live in Tehran, Iran, but would spend most of his time between Austria and Vienna, where in 1999 he would found the Camera Department, a resource for inspiring filmmakers.

Working for the stations ORF, BBC, ARTE, NHK, TV5, RAI, Esmann continues to be recognized for his contributions as a cameraman and director.
