= List of people from Vienna =

This is a list of notable people from Vienna, Austria.

== A–C ==
- Carlo Abarth (1908–1979), Italian race car driver and tuner.
- Gustav Abel (1902–1963), film architect and stage designer.
- Othenio Abel (1875–1946), paleontologist and evolutionary biologist.
- Wolfgang Abel (1905–1997), anthropologist.
- Christoph Ignaz Abele (1627–1685), lawyer and court official.
- Leo Aberer (born 1978), musician.
- Walter Abish (1931–2022), American writer.
- Leopold Ackermann (1771–1831), theologian.
- Antonie Adamberger (1790–1867), actress, fiancé of Theodor Körner.
- Karl Adamek (1910–2000), footballer and coach.
- Alfred Adler (1870–1937), founder of individual psychology.
- Victor Adler (1852–1918), social democrat and activist for the rights of workers.
- Ilse Aichinger (1921–2016), writer.
- David Alaba (born 1992), Austrian footballer.
- Christopher Alexander (1936–2022), England-based architect and design theorist; wrote book A Pattern Language (1977).
- Peter Altenberg (1859–1919), fin de siècle writer and poet.
- Wolfgang Ambros (born 1952), one of the founders of the musical movement Austropop.
- Bernard Amtmann (1907–1979), antiquarian bookseller, bibliographer, publisher.
- Ludwig Anzengruber (1839–1889), Austrian dramatist, novelist and poet.
- Walter Arlen (1920–2023), composer; music critic in LA Times.
- Alfred Ritter von Arneth (1819–1897), Austrian historian, wrote about Maria Theresa.
- Hans Asperger (1906–1980), pediatrician; discoverer of Asperger syndrome.
- Carl Auer von Welsbach (1858–1929), chemist.
- Ilse Barea-Kulcsar (1902–1973), journalist, translator, writer and communist activist.
- Haim Bar-Lev (1924–1994), Israeli general and government minister.
- Fanny Basch-Mahler (1854–1942), pianist and music teacher.
- Polly Batic (1906–1992), operatic mezzo-soprano.
- Eduard von Bauernfeld (1802–1890), Austrian dramatist.
- Vicki Baum (1888–1960), novelist.
- Alban Berg (1885–1935), composer.
- Herbert Berghof (1909–1990), late actor.
- Turhan Bey (1922–2012), actor.
- Hedy Bienenfeld (1907–1976), Austrian-American Olympic swimmer.
- Theodore Bikel (1924–2015), actor and singer.
- Karl Bitter (1867–1915), American architectural sculptor of memorials and residential works.
- John Paul Blass (1937–2023), physician, biochemist and neurochemist.
- Ludwig Boltzmann (1844–1906), physicist.
- Arik Brauer (1929–2021), painter, poet and singer.
- Eugene Braunwald (born 1929), cardiologist.
- Jenny Broch (1864–?), soprano
- Arnolt Bronnen (1895–1959), Austrian playwright and director.
- Vanessa Brown (born Smylla Brind, 1928–1999), actress.
- Martin Buber (1878–1965), philosopher.
- Ignaz Franz Castelli (1781–1862), Austrian dramatist.
- Dorrit Cohn (1924–2012), professor of comparative literature.
- Heinrich Joseph von Collin (1771–1811), Austrian dramatist.
- Carl Czerny (1791–1857), Austrian composer, teacher and pianist.
- Tadeusz Czeżowski (1889–1981), philosopher and logician.

== D–G ==
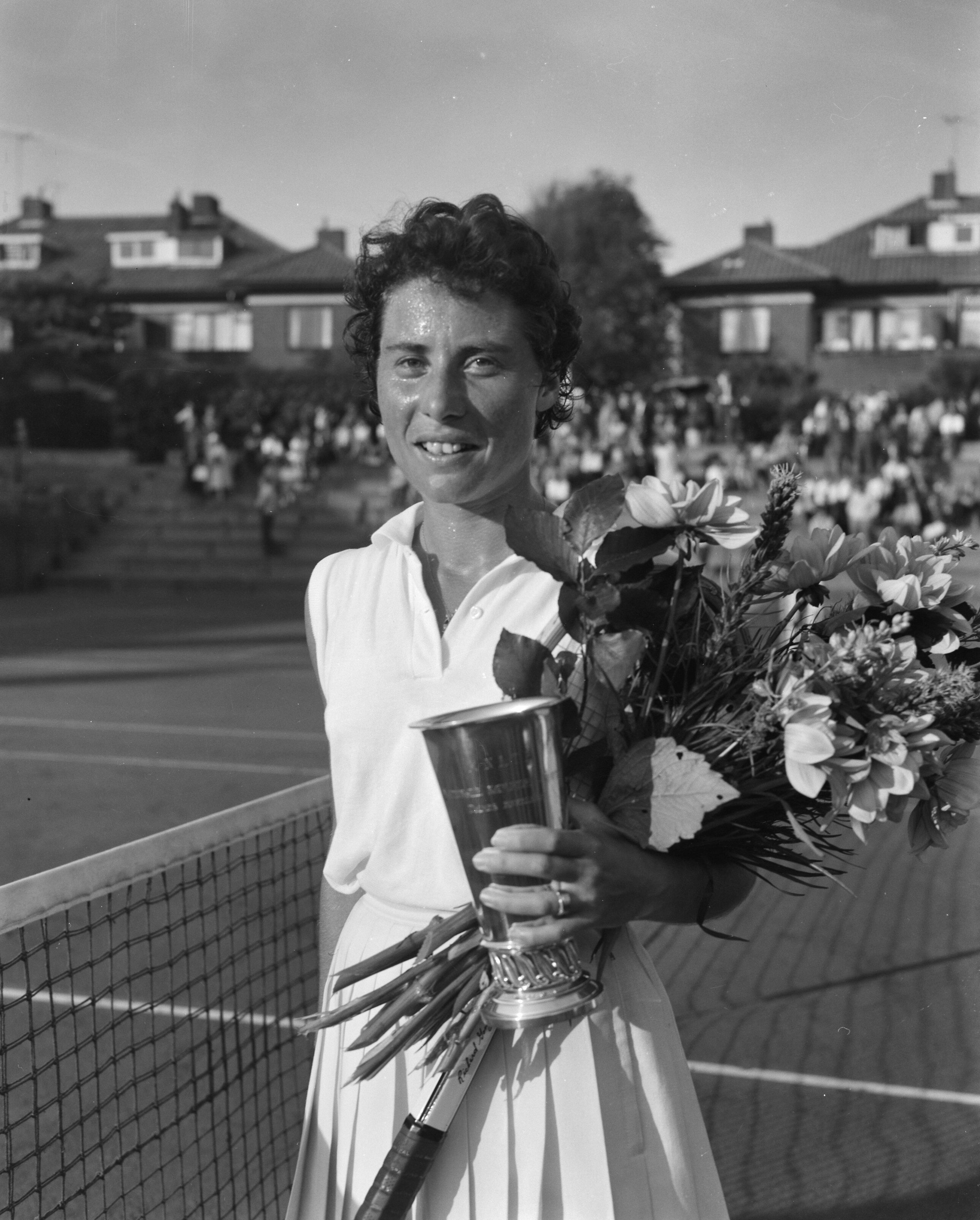
Eva Duldig

- Georg Danzer (1946–2007), songwriter.
- Elfi von Dassanowsky (1924–2007), film producer, pianist and singer.
- Marlene Engelhorn (born 1992), activist.
- Leopold Joseph von Daun (1705–1766), Austrian field marshal, later Prince of Thiano.
- Helmut Deutsch (born 1945), pianist.
- Oskar Deutsch (born 1963), entrepreneur and President of the Jewish Community of Vienna.
- Carl Ditters von Dittersdorf (1739–1799), Austrian composer, violinist and silvologist.
- Carl Djerassi (1923–2015), chemist, novelist, and playwright; developer of the oral contraceptive pill.
- Heimito von Doderer (1896–1966), writer.
- Georgia Doll (born 1980), theatre director, playwright and poet.
- Ludwig Donath (1900–1967), actor.
- Peter Drucker (1909–2005), economist.
- Eva Duldig (born 1938), Austrian-born Australian and Dutch tennis player, author.
- Klaus Ebner (born 1964), writer.
- Albert Ehrenstein (1886–1950), writer.
- Fanny Elssler (1810–1884), ballerina of the Romantic Period.
- Carl Esmond (1902–2004), actor.
- Constantin von Ettingshausen (1826–1897), botanist, studied of flora from the Tertiary era.
- Falco (1957–1998), instrumentalist and singer.
- Maria Zhorella Fedorova (1915–2017), lyric soprano.
- Robert Fein (1907–1975), Olympic Champion weightlifter.
- Ferdinand I of Austria (1793–1875), Emperor of Austria.
- Ferdinand I of Bulgaria (1861–1948), Tsar of Bulgaria.
- Ernst, Baron von Feuchtersleben (1806–1849), physician, poet and philosopher.
- Paul Feyerabend (1924–1994), philosopher.
- Otto Fischer (1901–1941), football player and coach.
- Trude Fleischmann (1895–1990), photographer.
- Willi Forst (1903–1980), actor, director, singer and writer.
- Francis I of Austria & Francis II, Holy Roman Emperor (1768–1835), Holy Roman Emperor and Emperor of Austria.
- Viktor Frankl (1905–1997), neurologist and psychiatrist; founder of logotherapy.
- Archduke Franz Ferdinand of Austria (1863–1914), heir presumptive to the throne of Austria-Hungary.
- Franz Joseph I of Austria (1830–1916), Emperor of Austria.
- Sigmund Freud (1856–1939), neurologist; founder of the psychoanalytic school of psychology.
- Karl von Frisch (1886–1982), animal psychologist, beekeeper and zoologist; co-recipient 1973 Nobel Prize in Physiology or Medicine.
- Nathan Michael Gelber (1891–1966), Austrian-Israeli historian
- Hilda Geiringer (1893–1973), mathematician.
- Karl Geiringer (1899–1989), musicologist.
- Amon Göth (1908–1946), Nazi SS concentration camp commandant executed for war crimes.
- Maximilian Grabner (1905–1948), Nazi Gestapo chief in Auschwitz executed for crimes against humanity.
- Ilona Graenitz (1943–2022), Austrian MP and MEP.
- Franz Grillparzer (1791–1872), writer and dramatist.
- Victor Gruen (1903–1980), architect.
- Ruth Grützbauch (born 1978), astronomer.
- Friedrich Gulda (1930–2000), composer and pianist.
- Alfred Guth (1908–1996), Austrian-born American water polo player, swimmer, and Olympic modern pentathlete.

== H–L ==
- Eduard Haas (1897–1989), inventor of Pez candy.
- Walter Hahn (born 1987), professional wrestler, performs under the name Gunther.
- Wilhelm Karl Ritter von Haidinger (1795–1871), Austrian mineralogist.
- Franz Ritter von Hauer (1822–1899), an Austrian geologist.
- Friedrich Hayek (1899–1992), economist; co-recipient of the 1974 Nobel Memorial Prize in Economic Sciences.
- Andre Heller (born 1947), artist, poet and songwriter.
- Gottfried Helnwein (born 1948), artist.
- Dr. Otto Herschmann (1877–1942), saber fencer, Olympic silver; 100-m freestyle in swimming, Olympic silver.
- Theodor Herzl (1860–1904), journalist; founder of modern political Zionism.
- Mickey Hirschl (1906–1991), Olympic-medal-winning wrestler, shot put and discus junior champion, weightlifting junior champion, and pentathlon champion.
- Pavla Hočevar (1889–1972), Slovenian teacher, writer, socialist and suffragist
- Hugo von Hofmannsthal (1874–1929), writer; founder of the Salzburg Festival.
- Oskar Homolka (1898–1978), actor.
- Moritz Hörnes (1815–1868), Austrian palaeontologist.
- Count Joseph Alexander Hübner (1811–1892), Austrian diplomat.
- Friedensreich Hundertwasser (1928–2000), architect and painter.
- Wolfgang Hutter (1928–2014), artist, painter and university art professor.
- Ernst Jandl (1925–2000), poet and writer.
- Joseph I, Holy Roman Emperor (1678–1711), ruler of the Austrian Habsburg monarchy from 1705 until his death
- Josef Jungwirth (1869–1950), painter
- Dora Kallmus (1881–1963), photographer
- Martin Karplus (1930–2024), theoretical chemist; co-recipient of the 2013 Nobel Prize in Chemistry
- Wenzel Anton, Prince of Kaunitz-Rietberg (1711–1794), Austrian and Czech diplomat and statesman
- Count Alajos Károlyi de Nagykároly (1825–1889), Austro-Hungarian diplomat
- Gina Kaus (1893–1985), novelist
- Abraham Klausner (Austrian rabbi), 14th-century rabbi
- Melchior Klesl (1552–1630), Austrian statesman and cardinal of the Roman Catholic church
- Gustav Klimt (1862–1918), painter
- Pina Kollar, singer-songwriter
- Alfred König (1913–1987), Austrian-Turkish Olympic sprinter
- Franz König (1905–2004), Cardinal Archbishop
- Karl Kordesch (1922–2011), chemist and inventor
- Hans Krankl (born 1953), football player
- Karl Kraus (1874–1936), satirist; publisher of the newspaper Die Fackel
- Klaus Kubinger (born 1949), psychologist, statistician, and university professor
- Steffi Kunke (1908–1942), teacher and anti-fascist activist
- Hedy Lamarr (1914–2000), actress and inventor
- Karl Landsteiner (1868–1943), biologist and physician; discoverer of blood group; recipient of the 1930 Nobel Prize in Physiology or Medicine
- Fritz Lang (1890–1976), director
- Ruth Langer (1921–1999), national champion swimmer
- Josef Lanner (1801–1843), composer
- Niki Lauda (1949–2019), entrepreneur and race car driver
- Henry Lehrman (1881–1946), silent film director
- Bill Leeb (born 1966), musician
- Lotte Lenya (1898–1981), actor and singer
- Leopold II, Holy Roman Emperor (1747–1792), Archduke of Austria from 1790 to 1792
- Leopold Lindtberg (1902–1984), director
- Edie Locke (1921–2020), fashion journalist
- Konrad Lorenz (1903–1989), behavioural scientist; co-recipient of the 1973 Nobel Prize in Physiology or Medicine
- Josef Lorenzl (1892–1950), sculptor
- Tilly Losch (1903–1975), actress and dancer
- Fritzi Löwy (1910–1994), Olympic swimmer
- Bernhard Ludvik (born 1961), physician

== M–R ==
- Anna Mahler (1904–1988), sculptor
- Gustav Mahler (1860–1911), composer and conductor
- Natascha Mair (born 1995), ballet dancer
- Marie Antoinette (1755–1793), daughter of Empress Maria Theresa of Austria; last absolute Queen of France (1774–1792)
- Maria Theresa (1717–1780), daughter of Charles VI, Holy Roman Emperor; Queen of Bohemia and Hungary (1740–1780)
- Matthias, Holy Roman Emperor (1557–1619), Archduke of Austria from 1608 to 1619
- Alice Mavrogordato (1916–2000), painter, translator during the Nuremberg trials
- Maximilian I, Holy Roman Emperor (1459–1519), Holy Roman Emperor from 1508 until his death
- Maximilian II, Holy Roman Emperor (1527–1576,) Holy Roman Emperor from 1564 until his death
- Maximilian I of Mexico (1832–1867), Emperor of Mexico
- Friederike Mayröcker (1924–2021), writer
- Lise Meitner (1878–1968), physicist
- Carl Menger (1840–1921), economist and founder of the Austrian School of economics
- Karl Menger (1902–1985), mathematician and son of Carl Menger
- Ludwig von Mises (1881–1973), economist
- Špelca Mladič (1894–1981), Slovenian painter and designer
- Johann August Georg Edmund Mojsisovics von Mojsvar (1839–1907), Austro-Hungarian geologist and palaeontologist.
- Adele Molnar, voice actress of Piglett in the German dub of "Winnie the Poo".
- Elfriede Moser-Rath (1926–1993), folklorist.
- Karl Motesiczky (1904–1943), psychoanalyst.
- Felix Josef von Mottl (1856–1911), Austrian conductor and composer.
- Reggie Nalder (1907–1991), film and television character actor.
- Itzhak Nener (1919–2012), jurist who cofounded the International Association of Jewish Lawyers and Jurists and served as vice-president of Liberal International.
- Johann Nestroy (1801–1862), playwright.
- Fritz Neugebauer (born 1944), second president of the Austrian National Council.
- Peter C. Newman (1929–2023), journalist.
- Saul K. Padover (1905–1981), historian and political scientist at The New School of Social Research in New York City, New York, US.
- Alfred Pal (1920–2010), Croatian graphic designer and painter.
- Bertha Pappenheim (1859–1936), feminist.
- Wolfgang Pauli (1900–1958), physicist.
- August von Pettenkofen (1822–1889), Austrian painter.
- Ida Laura Pfeiffer (1797–1858), Austrian explorer, travel writer and ethnographer.
- Caroline Pichler (1769–1843), Austrian historical novelist.
- Johannes Pietsch (born 2001), singer, winner of the Eurovision Song Contest 2025.
- Anton Piëch (1894–1952), lawyer, son-in-law of Ferdinand Porsche.
- Thila Plaichinger (1868–1939), opera singer.
- Friderika Podgornik (1880–1948), Slovenian pianist and music educator.
- Karl Polanyi (1886–1964), economic historian.
- Alfred Polgar (1873–1955), author and journalist.
- Józef Poniatowski (1763–1813), Polish general.
- Karl Popper (1902–1994), philosopher.
- Ellen Preis (Ellen Müller-Preis) (1912–2007) – German-born Austrian Olympic champion foil fencer.
- Friederike Proch Benesch (1805–1872), Chezh pianist, music educator and composer.
- Helmut Qualtinger (1928–1986), actor, cabaret performer and writer.
- Doron Rabinovici (born 1961), writer.
- Ferdinand Raimund (1790–1836), playwright.
- Heinrich Rauchinger (1858–1942), painter.
- Karl Leonhard Reinhold (1757–1823), Austrian philosopher, popularised the work of Immanuel Kant.
- Shoshana Ribner (1938–2007), Israeli Olympic swimmer.
- Thomas Robinson, 2nd Baron Grantham (1738–1786), British statesman; Foreign Secretary, 1782/3.
- Alma Rosé (1906–1944), violinist; killed at the Auschwitz concentration camp.
- Stella Rotenberg (1915–2013), poet and Shoah victim.
- Rudolf II, Holy Roman Emperor (1552–1612), Archduke of Austria (1576–1608).

== S–Z ==
- Felix Salten (1869–1945), writer.
- Fritz Saxl (1890–1948), art historian.
- Egon Schiele (1890–1918), artist.
- Romy Schneider (1938–1982), actress.
- Arthur Schnitzler (1862–1931), story teller and playwright.
- Arnold Schoenberg (1874–1951), composer, music theorist and painter.
- Joseph Schildkraut (1896–1964), actor.
- Pauline Schöller (1859–1941), soprano and voice teacher.
- Erwin Schrödinger (1887–1961), physicist; co-recipient of the 1933 Nobel Prize in Physics.
- Franz Schubert (1797–1828), composer.
- Ernst Schwadron (1896–1979), architect.
- Moritz von Schwind (1804–1871), Austrian painter.
- Peter Seisenbacher (born 1960), judoka.
- Karl Seitz (1869–1950), first President of Austria.
- Hans Selye (1907–1982), physiologist.
- Dovid Shmidel (born 1934), rabbi.
- Matthias Sindelar (1903–1939), football player.
- Josef Singer (1923–2009), Israeli President of Technion – Israel Institute of Technology.
- Hans Werner Sokop (born 1942), poet and translator.
- Ignaz Sowinski (1858–1917), architect.
- Leopold Stein, psychologist and author.
- Josef von Sternberg (1894–1969), film director.
- Eduard Strauss (1835–1916), composer.
- Johann Strauss I (1804–1849), Austrian composer of the Romantic Period.
- Johann Strauss II (1825–1899), composer.
- Josef Strauss (1827–1870), composer.
- Erich von Stroheim (1885–1957), actor.
- István Széchenyi (1791–1860), Hungarian politician, political theorist and writer.
- Eduard Taaffe, 11th Viscount Taaffe (1833–1895), an Austrian statesman.
- Sara Telek (born 1988), football referee.
- Friedrich Torberg (1908–1979), writer and journalist.
- Maria von Trapp (1905–1987), guitarist singer and deutergamy of Baron Georg von Trapp.
- Olga von Türk-Rohn (1865–1940), soprano and baroness
- Robert Valberg (1884–1955), stage and film actor.
- Barbara Valentin (1940–2002), actress.
- Thomas Vanek (born 1984), professional ice hockey player.
- Nikolas Vogel (1967–1991), film actor and news camera operator.
- Otto Wagner (1841–1918), architect.
- Maria Wähnl (1908–1989), astronomer.
- Bruno Walter (1876–1962), conductor.
- Christoph Waltz (born 1956), actor.
- Katia Wagner (born 1988), Miss Earth Air 2013.
- Erich Wasicky (1911–1947), Nazi SS pharmacist at Mauthausen concentration camp in charge of gassing victims; was executed.
- Anton von Webern (1883–1945), composer.
- Otto Weininger (1880–1903), philosopher.
- Franz Werfel (1890–1945), writer.
- Christine Werner (born 1954), writer
- Marion Wiesel (born Mary Renate Erster; 1931–2025), Austrian-American Holocaust survivor, humanitarian, and translator
- Cyla Wiesenthal (1908–2003), wife of Simon Wiesenthal
- Simon Wiesenthal (1908–2005), nazi hunter
- Friedrich von Wieser (1851–1926), economist.
- Geri Winkler (born 1956), mountaineer.
- Ludwig Wittgenstein (1889–1951), philosopher.
- Toto Wolff (born 1972), motorsport executive, investor, and former racing driver.
- Hermine Zaynard (1913–1943), political activist
- Joe Zawinul (1932–2007), composer, keyboard player and jazz pianist.
- Heinz Zednik (born 1940), tenor.
- Heinrich Ritter von Zeissberg (1839–1899), Austrian historian.
- Alexander von Zemlinski (1871–1942), composer.
- Fred Zinnemann (1907–1997), director.
- Zoë (born 1996), singer-songwriter and actress.
- Birgit Zotz (born 1979), writer.
- Stefan Zweig (1881–1942), writer.
- Károly Zipernowsky (1853–1942), electrical engineer who co-invented the transformer

== See also ==
- List of Austrians
