= Ramune candy =

Japanese confectionery

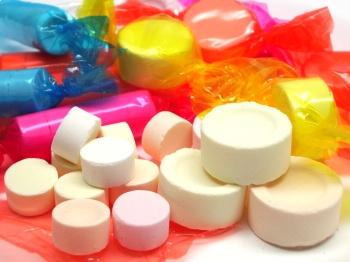
Wet process type ramune

Ramune candy (Japanese: ラムネ) is a kind of Japanese tablet candy. It is generally made from sugar, mixed with a small amount of a binder and other ingredients, and compressed in a tableting machine.

== Overview ==
Since there is no clear definition of ramune, many different types of tablet candies are called ramune. It has in common that it is a confectionery made of solidified powder. Therefore, it is opaque. It also contains some kind of acidifier.

The name may be a reference to the ramune beverage, which is derived from Lemonade, but details are unknown.

There are two major manufacturing methods and different textures, but they are both called ramune.

One method is to mix the raw materials with water, harden them, and then use heat to remove the water. Because of its high porosity, it dissolves quickly in the mouth. This was the original ramune candy.

The other is pressed without mixing in water. Early dry ramune, such as "Juicy" sold by Kabaya in 1965.

In addition, some products are made by mixing baking soda and citric acid as ingredients, and when dissolved in the mouth, the neutralization reaction produces carbon dioxide, which lowers the temperature and gives the product a cool, refreshing sensation. Homemade ramune was hardly popular, but in the 2000s it became widely known that it could be easily produced with familiar ingredients such as baking soda, potato starch, and citric acid, and was introduced as part of cooking and chemistry experiments.

== Preceding products ==
There is a Japanese confection called rakugan that existed as late as 1635. It is made of flour made from cereal grains, mixed with starch syrup and sugar, colored, pressed into a mold (wooden or ceramic) and dried. However, since the main ingredient is grain powder rather than sugar, the taste and texture are different from that of ramune.

In the 1780s, Altoids, a small mint pastry, was created in London. They were made by mixing powdered sugar, gum arabic, peppermint oil, and food coloring, spread into thin sheets, and then molded.

In 1921, Meiji company launched "Calmin," a tablet confection containing calcium.

In 1927, Austrian industrialist Eduard Haas introduced the "Pez" Drops, a tablet confection made of solidified sugar, corn syrup, vegetable fat, flavoring and coloring.

== History ==
There are various theories, including one that it originated in Japan in 1881, based on the method used to make rakugan, but the details are unknown.

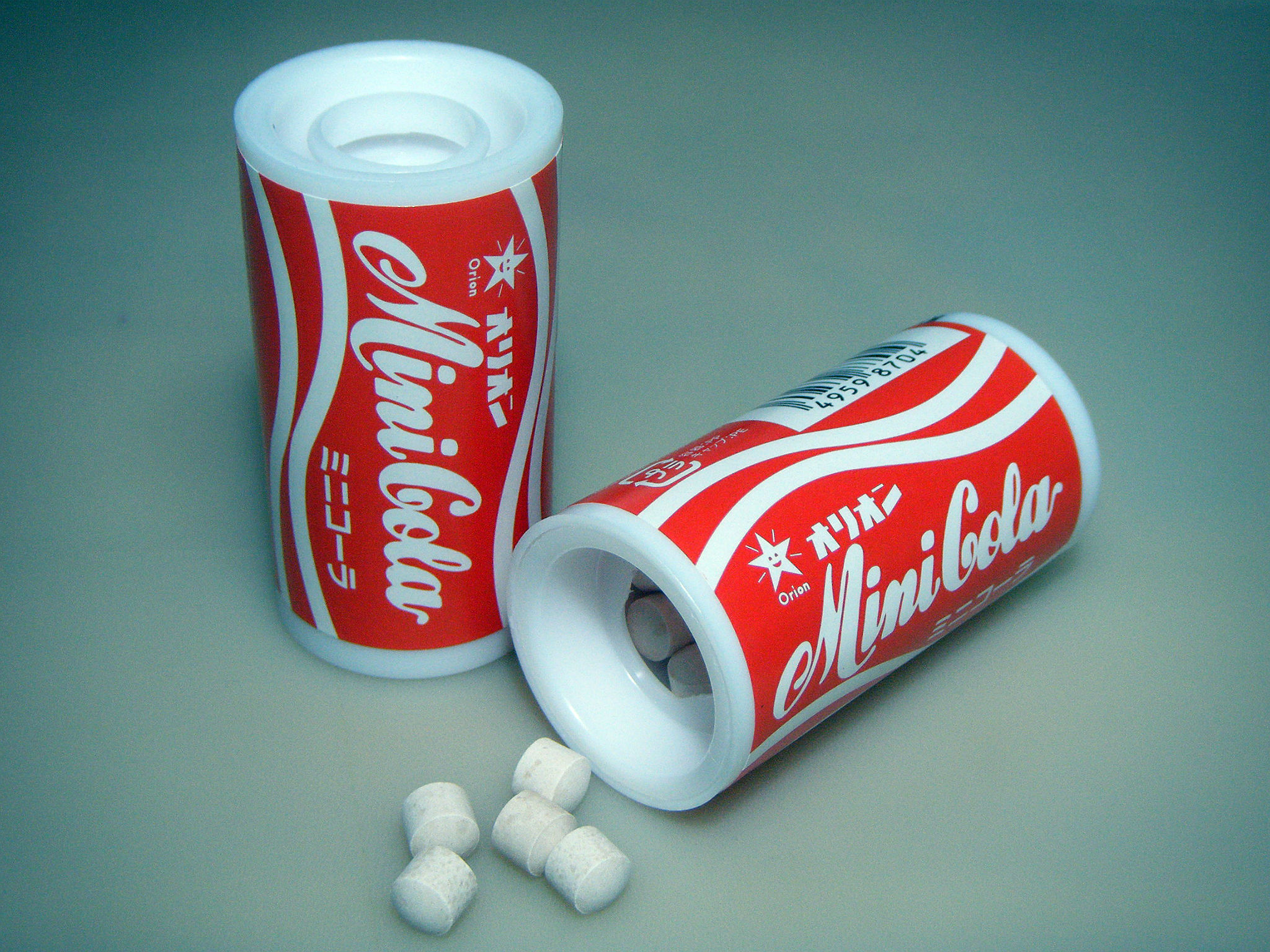
Mini-Cola (1978)

In 1948, Tsuchitana Confectionery in Tokyo started production and sales.

In 1949, Shimada Confectionery in Osaka started production and sales.

In 1950, Ohashi Shoten (now Kakudai Seika), a Nagoya-based manufacturer of semi-perishable Japanese confections, began manufacturing and selling them as a prize in raffle at candy shops.

In 1973, Morinaga Seika began selling Morinaga Ramune, a tablet confectionery made by a dry process in a container that imitated a codd-neck bottle. It was made from glucose, which was rare at the time, to create a cool sensation similar to that of ramune beverages.

In 1978, Orion introduced "Mini-Cola," a container made to resemble a Coca-Cola can.

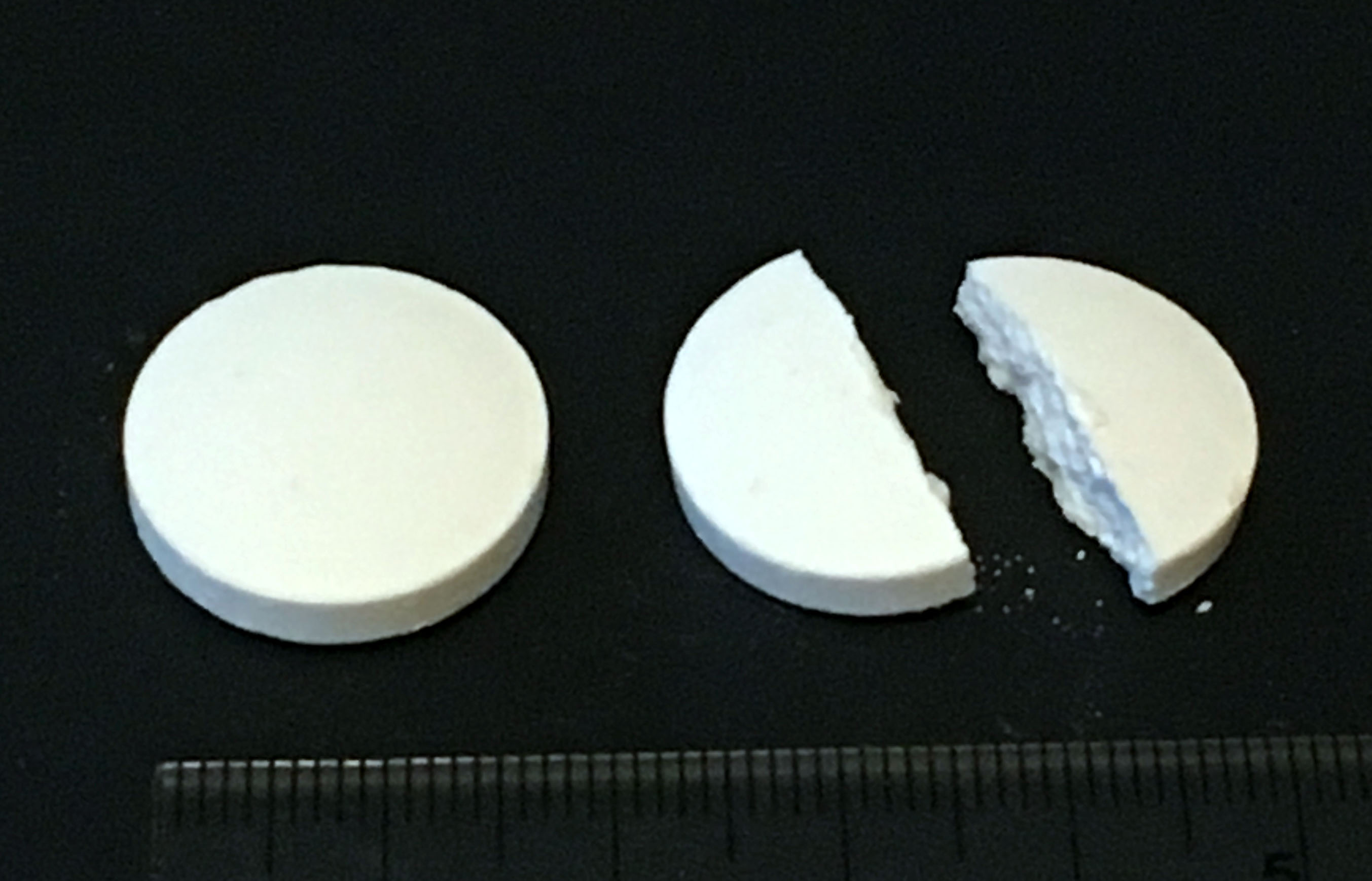
Yoglet (1979)

In 1979, Meiji company launched "Yoglet" containing bifidobacteria. In 1980, "Hi-Lemon" with Vitamin C was launched.

In 1989, Morinaga Seika introduced "Ramune Bar," a popsicle containing ramune candy.

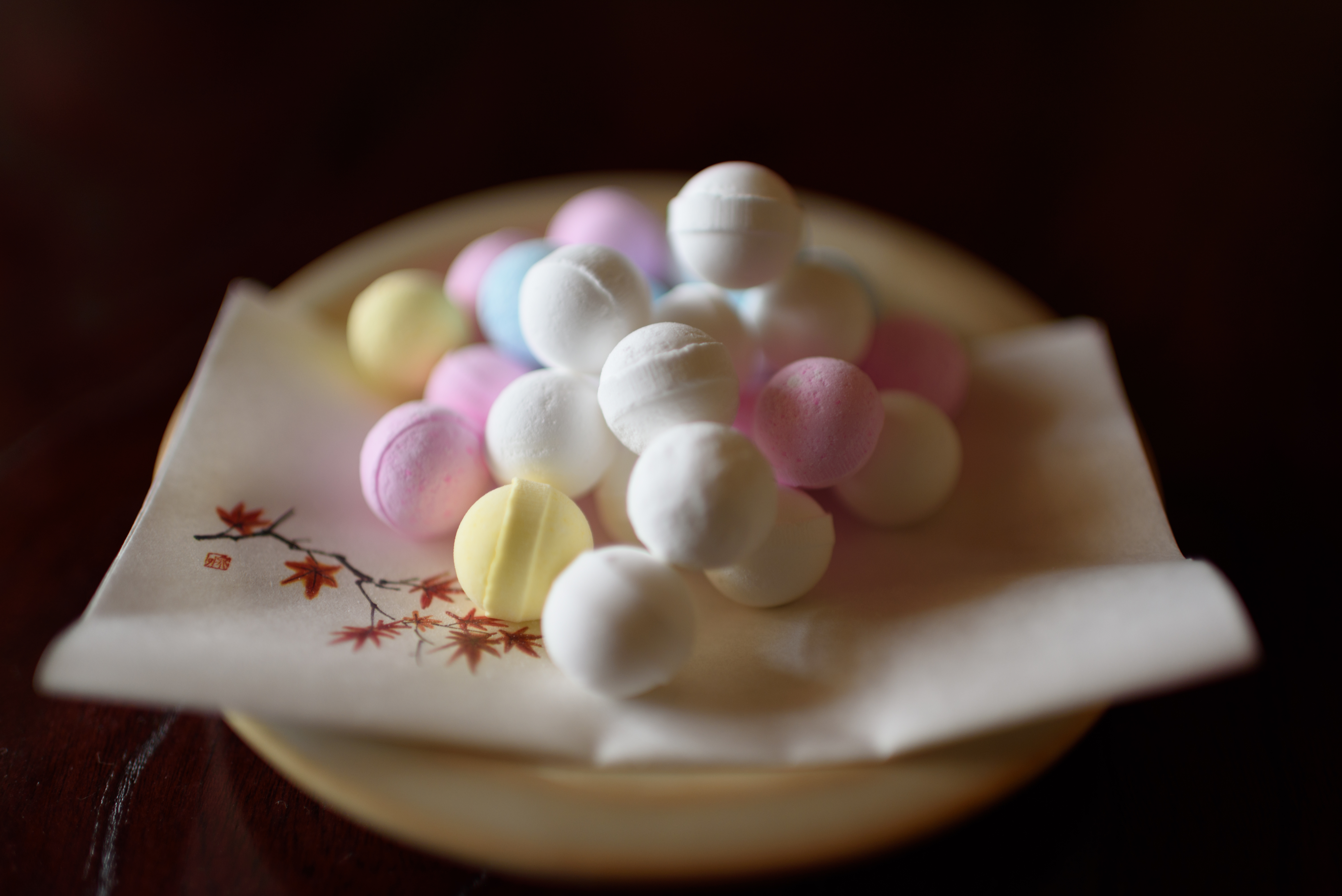
Rainbow Ramune (1993)

Around 1993, Ikoma Confectionery in Nara Prefecture developed a spherical "Rainbow Ramune" inspired by the World Cup soccer Asian qualification Japan v Iraq.
