= Jungwirth =

Jungwirth is a German surname. Notable people with the surname include:

- Daniel Jungwirth (born 1982), German footballer
- Florian Jungwirth (born 1989), German footballer
- Gerold Jungwirth (born 1947), Austrian judoka
- Josef Jungwirth (1869-1950), Austrian painter
- Ken Jungwirth (born 1946), Australian rules footballer
- Leonard D. Jungwirth (1903–1963 or 1964), American sculptor
- Lukas Jungwirth (born 2004), Austrian footballer
- Manfred Jungwirth (1919–1999), Austrian opera singer
- Stanislav Jungwirth (1930-1986), Czechoslovak middle-distance runner
- Tomáš Jungwirth (1942–1998), Czech middle-distance runner
- William John Jungwirth (1897-1981), Australian public servant
