= Loathing =

Loathing or loathe or loathsome may refer to:

- Feeling of disgust or strong hatred
- Loathe (band), an English heavy metal band
- Loathing (album), a music album by Broken Hope
- Loathsome Women, a book by Leopold Stein
