= Star Wars Pez =

Star Wars themed Pez candy dispenser

A Star Wars Pez is a Pez candy dispenser themed after the Star Wars movies, and is one of the company's most prominent merchandising deals. Approximately 100 dispensers have been released on the market from 1997 to 2023, among the many collectibles spawned by the franchise.

The extreme interest of marketing executives in all things Star Wars has spawned a scholarly interest in the "materializing fantasy media" such as these Pez dispensers. It has also led to several museums to feature such Stars Wars memorabilia in their exhibits and/or gift shops, as well as media attention on this fairly odd phenomenon.

== In museum exhibits and gift shops ==
In recent years, several museums around the United States have featured Star Wars Pez in their exhibits and/or gift shops. These products are displayed and exhibited because they are classic Americana. Despite the dispensers' "popularity and cult status," the manufacturer's original factory in Austria does not give tours or sell fancifully-shaped memorabilia. Only in January 2012, Star Wars dispensers are prominently displayed at the company's new North American headquarters in Orange, Connecticut. One travelogue wrote, "The company has been making the cartoonish plastic heads for 60 years now, representing everything from Star Wars to U.S. presidents to the Geico chameleon."

The Clayton Historical Museum, in Clayton, California opened a new exhibit on the history of candy manufacture in January 2012 that featured these confectionery dispensers.

Pez with Star Wars characters have been featured prominently in the Star Wars Museum in Maryland. The Star Wars Pez dispensers are pictured on a fan website, which describes them as "some Candy Heads from 1980."

The Pacific Science Center sold Pez at a popular exhibit about Star Wars.

These branded dispensers were among the "top sellers" at the gift shop at the Burlingame Museum of Pez Memorabilia, in Burlingame, California. The museum also displayed "a whole lot of Star Wars Pez," in Plexiglas displays. The Burlingame "unofficial shrine" to the collectibles was unaffiliated with Pez Candy, Inc., and the manufacturer sued the Burlingame museum in 2009 for copyright infringement. There was a notorious, giant Pez sculpture of C-3PO and Chewbacca locked in a slash fiction kiss. The museum closed in 2019.

Another Pez museum in Easton, Pennsylvania also has featured prominently their obligatory Star Wars memorabilia, ("Of course, we had to include the Star Wars Pez Dispensers"), including an oversize Darth Vader figurine. This museum closed to the public in 2012.

== Other influences ==
Carrie Fisher's "Princess Leia Pez dispenser" is one of the "merchandising horrors" she discusses in her one-woman show Wishful Drinking.

These candy dispensers are featured prominently in the 2010 Emmy Award-winning fan film, Star Wars Uncut.

Star Wars Pez has a gateway drug-like effect for some young collectors. One fan of Pez dispensers started her huge horde with Star Wars figurines at the age of three. Another fan calls Pez dispensers generally "a gateway drug to hardcore collecting". Pezheads shopping for new dispensers frequently place Star Wars first on their shopping lists.

== Chronology of releases ==
Five Star Wars Pez were released in 1997:

- Darth Vader
- Yoda
- Chewbacca (first version)
- C-3PO
- Stormtrooper (first version)

Four Star Wars Pez were released in 1998 in advance of the May 19, 1999 premier of Star Wars: Episode I – The Phantom Menace:

- Luke Skywalker
- Princess Leia
- Wicket the Ewok
- Boba Fett (first version)

A Jar Jar Binks Pez Hander battery operated toy was released in 1999.

Three Star Wars Pez were released in 2002 for Star Wars: Episode II – Attack of the Clones:

- Jango Fett
- Clone Trooper
- R2-D2

In 2003 Pez released three Limited Edition Collectable Crystal Star Wars dispensers:

- Darth Vader
- Yoda
- C-3PO

14 Giant Pez were released in 2005 to commemorate Star Wars: Episode III – Revenge of the Sith:

- Darth Vader
- Clone Trooper
- R2-D2
- C-3PO
- Death Star
- Chewbacca
- Yoda
- General Grievous
- Emperor Palpatine
- Darth Vader (Metal Vader)
- Yoda (Crystal Yoda)
- C-3PO (Metal C-3PO)
- Chewbacca (Bronze Chewbacca)
- General Grievous (Pearl Grievous)

Pez also released five standard-size dispensers in 2005 for the Star Wars: Episode III – Revenge of the Sith movie release:

- Emperor Palpatine
- General Grievous
- Death Star (first version)
- Chewbacca (second version)
- Emperor Palpatine (glow-in-the-dark version, Walmart exclusive)

Walmart released an exclusive limited edition gift set in 2005 containing nine Star Wars Pez dispensers previously available individually. That same year, Pez also released the same nine dispensers in a special numbered limited edition set.

- Death Star (first version)
- Boba Fett
- General Grievous
- Emperor Palpatine (glow-in-the-dark version)
- Darth Vader
- R2-D2
- Chewbacca (second version, updated design)
- Yoda
- C-3PO

For the 2009 animated release of Star Wars: The Clone Wars (film) Pez released three dispensers:

- Obi-Wan Kenobi
- Anakin Skywalker
- Ahsoka

Pez released two dispensers in 2012 for the 3D release of Star Wars: Episode I – The Phantom Menace:

- Darth Maul
- Yoda (second version, updated design)

Two Star Wars Pez were released in 2013:

- Boba Fett (second version, lighter green)
- Giant Darth Vader

Four limited edition crystal Star Wars Pez were released in 2015 as a gift tin:

- Crystal Darth Vader
- Crystal Yoda
- Crystal C-3PO
- Crystal R2-D2

Only one individual Star Wars dispenser was released in 2015:

- Darth Vader (second version, updated design)

In 2016 a Rogue One gift tin was released containing four dispensers:

- Stormtrooper (first version, re-released)
- Death Trooper → Stormtrooper (Star Wars) § Imperial variants
- Darth Vader (2015 version)
- Death Star (second version, updated design)

From 2016 - 2017 seven individual Star Wars Pez were released for Star Wars: The Force Awakens and Rogue One:

- BB-8
- First Order Stormtrooper → Stormtrooper (Star Wars) § First Order variants
- Kylo Ren (first version)
- Porg
- Praetorian Guard
- Rey (Star Wars) (first version, with grey base)
- Stormtrooper Executioner → Stormtrooper (Star Wars) § First Order variants

In 2017 a Millennium Falcon gift tin was released containing four dispensers:

- Rey (Star Wars) (first version, with grey base)
- BB-8
- Han Solo (first version, older Han)
- Chewbacca (second version, re-released)

For the 2018 theatrical release of Solo: A Star Wars Story a gift tin containing four Star Wars dispensers was released:

- Chewbacca (third version, with bandolier)
- Han Solo (second version, younger Han)
- Lando Calrissian
- L3-37

A giant BB-8 was also released in 2018.

In 2019 to celebrate the premier of The Mandalorian, Pez partnered with Funko to produce seven Star Wars dispensers akin to the Pop! Vinyl line of figures:

- Boba Fett Holiday
- Boba Fett
- Bossk
- Logray
- Lando
- Ponda Baba
- Snaggletooth

For the 2019 holiday season a limited edition gift tin (of which "only 75,000 tins" were produced) with four dispensers was released for Star Wars: The Rise of Skywalker:

- First Order Stormtrooper (2017 version, re-released) → Stormtrooper (Star Wars) § First Order variants
- Kylo Ren (second version, red cracks in mask)
- Sith Trooper → Stormtrooper (Star Wars) § Sith Eternal variants
- White Rocket (Jet) Trooper → Stormtrooper (Star Wars) § Sith Eternal variants

For the 2019 theatrical release of Star Wars: The Rise of Skywalker four dispensers were released:

- D-O (Star Wars)
- Rey (Star Wars) (second version, white base)
- Kylo Ren (second version, red cracks in mask)
- Sith Trooper → Stormtrooper (Star Wars) § Sith Eternal variants

Pez released six new Star Wars dispensers in 2020:

- Darth Vader (giant, metallic finish) to commemorate the 40th Anniversary of Star Wars: The Empire Strikes Back
- The Mandalorian gift set containing:
  - Grogu (mini height base)
  - The Mandalorian (Star Wars character)
- Grogu (regular height base)
- The Mandalorian (Star Wars character) (individually wrapped, same dispenser as gift set)
- Funko gift set containing:
  - The Mandalorian (Star Wars character)
  - Grogu (The Child)

In 2021 Pez released the first two Star Wars Pez Clips, a new short-base format "to take on the go." These were sold in a 2-pack including:

- Grogu (The Child)
- The Mandalorian (Star Wars character)

During November 2022 Pez released six new Star Wars dispensers including a gift tin to coincide with the debut of The Mandalorian (Star Wars character) and Grogu at Star Wars: Galaxy's Edge, in Disneyland Park.

- Boba Fett (third version, darker green and with helmet dent)
- The Mandalorian gift tin with 4 dispensers:
  - The Mandalorian (Star Wars character) (2020 version)
  - Grogu (in hovering pram)
  - Fennec Shand
  - Boba Fett (2022 version)
- 2 Walmart exclusive holiday Pez packaged on holiday themed blister card:
  - Grogu (with “Galaxy's Greetings” in white letters on red base)
  - Grogu (with “Merry Force Be With You” in white letters on red base)

October 2023 marked 100 years of Disney, and Pez released several collectable tins of platinum dispensers for the 100th anniversary celebration. The Disney 100 Star Wars tin includes:

- R2-D2 (platinum finish)
- Darth Vader (platinum finish)
- Grogu (platinum finish)
- Chewbacca (platinum finish)

For the 2023 debut of Ahsoka (TV series), three Star Wars dispensers were released:

- Ahsoka (second version, updated design)
- Chewbacca (fourth version, updated design, lighter brown)
- R2-D2 (second version, updated design, dark blue base)

Pez released 2 additional Christmas themed Grogu dispensers in 2023, both on a holiday designed blister card:

- Grogu (with “Up to Snow Good” in white letters on red base)
- Grogu (with “Joy to the Galaxy” in white letters on red base)
