= Bernhard Ludvik =

Austrian physician (born 1961)

Bernhard Ludvik (born 21 June 1961) is a Specialist in Internal Medicine, board certified in Endocrinology and Metabolism. He is currently an associate professor of medicine at the Medical University of Vienna. He serves as the deputy head of the Division of Endocrinology and Metabolism at the General Hospital Vienna (AKH-Allgemeines Krankenhaus).

== Education and career ==
Bernhard Ludvik was born in Vienna in 1961. He attended the medical school at the University of Vienna and graduated as Doctor of Medicine ( M.D.) in 1985. After his internship and residency from 1985 to 1992 at the Medical Department II, University of Vienna, he was a research fellow at the University of California, San Diego for two years and was appointed associate professor at the Medical University of Vienna the following year. Bernhard Ludvik is a specialist in internal medicine and board certified in Endocrinology and Metabolism since 1996. Since 2009 he is the deputy-head of the Division of Endocrinology and Metabolism and the acting head of the Diabetes Outpatient Clinic at the Department of Internal Medicine III, University of Vienna (Vienna General Hospital).

== Current functions (2011) ==
- Immediate past president of the Austrian Diabetes Organisation and past president of the Austrian Obesity Association
- Section editor (for the section: Clinical Aspects and Treatment) Obesity Facts - The European Journal of Obesity
- Advisory board of the Austrian Obesity Association
- Member of the editorial board and editor in chief of Journal für Ernährungsmedizin
- Member of the scientific committee of the IFSO (International Federation for the Surgery of Obesity)

== Honors and awards ==
- Research grant "Erste Österreichische Sparkasse“ (1992)
- Fellowship of the Max Kade Foundation; research fellow at the University of San Diego, California (1992–1994)
- Hoechst Award (1995)
- 1st secretary of the Federation of the International DONAU-SYMPOSIA on Diabetes mellitus (1996–1999)
- Assistant editor of DIABETOLOGIA (1998–2003)
- Chairman of the European Congress on Obesity (ECO) Vienna, Austria (2001)
- Founding fellow of the SCOPE program (EASO) (2004)
- 2nd secretary of the Austrian Society of Internal Medicine (2005)

== Scientific interest and research highlights ==
- Research in obesity, metabolic syndrome and diabetes, more than 95 peer-reviewed publications in high ranked journals, reviewer in top journals, successful application for research grants, organisation of national and international meetings
- Basic research on the pathogenesis and therapy of type 2 diabetes, the metabolic syndrome and obesity
- Clinical research on the treatment of obesity, diabetes and lipid metabolism as the principal investigator of numerous studies and clinical trials
- Nutritional medicine
- Original contributions in many top journals, review articles, book contributions, numerous presentations at national and international congresses, organization of national and international congresses, referent at training events, reviews in top journals (Diabetes Care, Diabetologia, European Journal of Clinical Investigation)

== Memberships ==
- Austrian Society of Internal Medicine
- Austrian Diabetes Association
- Austrian Obesity Association
- Austrian Society of Endocrinology
- American Diabetes Association
- European Association for the Study of Obesity (EASO)
- European Association for the Study of Diabetes (EASD)
- European Group on Insulin Resistance (EGIR)
- Federation of International Donau Symposia on Diabetes mellitus

== Selected papers and reviews ==
- Bohdjalian, Arthur; Prager, Gerhard; Rosak, Christoph; Weiner, Rudolf; Jung, Ralf; Schramm, Markus; Aviv, Ricardo; Schindler, Karin; et al. (2009). "Improvement in Glycemic Control in Morbidly Obese Type 2 Diabetic Subjects by Gastric Stimulation". Obesity Surgery. 19 (9): 1221–7. doi:10.1007/s11695-009-9901-z. PMID 19575272. S2CID 24553682.
- Haider, D. G.; Schindler, K.; Prager, G.; Bohdjalian, A.; Luger, A.; Wolzt, M.; Ludvik, B. (2006). "Serum Retinol-Binding Protein 4 is Reduced after Weight Loss in Morbidly Obese Subjects". Journal of Clinical Endocrinology & Metabolism. 92 (3): 1168–71. doi:10.1210/jc.2006-1839. PMID 17164313.
- Haider, D. G.; Schindler, K; Schaller, G; Prager, G; Wolzt, M; Ludvik, B (2006). "Increased Plasma Visfatin Concentrations in Morbidly Obese Subjects Are Reduced after Gastric Banding". Journal of Clinical Endocrinology & Metabolism. 91 (4): 1578–81. doi:10.1210/jc.2005-2248. PMID 16449335.
- Lamsweerde-Gallez, D.; Meessen, A. (1975). "The role of proteins in a dipole model for steady-state ionic transport through biological membranes". Journal of Membrane Biology. 23 (2): 103–37. doi:10.1007/BF01870247. PMID 1177292. S2CID 24250126.
- Georg, P.; Kautzky-Willer, A.; Mahdjoobian, K.; Hofer, A.; Prager, R.; Pacini, G.; Ludvik, B. H. (2002). "Influence of Metabolic Control on Splanchnic Glucose Uptake, Insulin Sensitivity, and the Time Required for Glucose Absorption in Patients With Type 1 Diabetes". Diabetes Care. 25 (11): 2042–7. doi:10.2337/diacare.25.11.2042. PMID 12401754.
- Ludvik, B; Nolan, J J; Roberts, A; Baloga, J; Joyce, M; Bell, J M; Olefsky, J M (1997). "Evidence for decreased splanchnic glucose uptake after oral glucose administration in non-insulin-dependent diabetes mellitus". Journal of Clinical Investigation. 100 (9): 2354–61. doi:10.1172/JCI119775. PMC 508433. PMID 9410915.
- Ludvik, B; Nolan, J J; Roberts, A; Baloga, J; Joyce, M; Bell, J M; Olefsky, J M (1995). "A noninvasive method to measure splanchnic glucose uptake after oral glucose administration". Journal of Clinical Investigation. 95 (5): 2232–8. doi:10.1172/JCI117913. PMC 295835. PMID 7738188.
- Ludvik, B.; Nolan, J. J.; Baloga, J.; Sacks, D.; Olefsky, J. (1995). "Effect of obesity on insulin resistance in normal subjects and patients with NIDDM". Diabetes. 44 (9): 1121–5. doi:10.2337/diabetes.44.9.1121. PMID 7657038.
- Nolan, John J.; Ludvik, Bernhard; Beerdsen, Patricia; Joyce, Mary; Olefsky, Jerrold (1994). "Improvement in Glucose Tolerance and Insulin Resistance in Obese Subjects Treated with Troglitazone". New England Journal of Medicine. 331 (18): 1188–93. doi:10.1056/NEJM199411033311803. PMID 7935656.
- Ludvik, B; Clodi, M; Kautzky-Willer, A; Schuller, M; Graf, H; Hartter, E; Pacini, G; Prager, R (1994). "Increased levels of circulating islet amyloid polypeptide in patients with chronic renal failure have no effect on insulin secretion". Journal of Clinical Investigation. 94 (5): 2045–50. doi:10.1172/JCI117558. PMC 294639. PMID 7962550.

== Books ==
- Ludvik B (Ed.): Risikofaktor Diabetes – Konzepte für ein Langzeitproblem. Uni-Med-Verlag Bremen, 1.Aufl. 2004 ISBN 3-89599-824-9
- Mihaljevic K, Feffer S, Ludvik B: Essen mit Spass + Aktivsein mit Mass. So entkommen Sie dem Metabolischen Syndrom, Verlagshaus der Ärzte, 1. Aufl. 2006 ISBN 3-901488-75-8
- Pfeiffer A, Ludvik B, Kinzl JF: Für immer dünn. [Audio CD - Hörbuch], Galila Hörbuchverlag, 1.Aufl. 2006 ISBN 3-902533-01-3
- Prager R, Abrahamian H, Kautzky-Willer A, Ludvik B, Schütz-Fuhrmann I, Weitgasser R: Diabetesmanagement mit Insulinanaloga. UNI-MED Verlag AG, 1. Auflage, 2008 ISBN 978-3-89599-919-2
