= Traudl Engelhorn-Vechiatto =

German businesswoman

- Born: Gertraud Vechiatto

Gertraud "Traudl" Engelhorn-Vechiatto (née Vechiatto; 19 January 1927 – 22 September 2022) was an Austrian socialite, billionaire heiress and philanthropist. In 2022, Forbes estimated her net worth at $4.2 billion.

== Early life and education ==
Vechiatto was born 19 January 1927 in Vienna, Austria, into an affluent family of Venetian descent. Her grandfather, Josef Vechiatto, was a manufacturer who owned silk dyeing works and was also a benefactor of the Technologische Gewerbemuseum (an technical engineering school) as well as Volkstheater, Vienna. She studied to ultimately becoming a publishers bookseller and lecturer.

== Personal life ==
In 1955, Vechiatto married German-born Peter Engelhorn (1924–1991), a son of Rudolf Conrad Engelhorn and Lotte Engelhorn (née Clemm), and one of the principal heirs of BASF. They had four daughters:

- Angelika Engelhorn (born 1956), married Milos
- Ariane Engelhorn (born 1957), married Binder
- Alissa Engelhorn (born 1959), married Gerlich
- Sonia Engelhorn (born 1962), had one daughter, Marlene Engelhorn.

Engelhorn passed away 22 September 2022 in Switzerland. She was a resident of Lausanne on Lake Geneva.
