= Curtis Allina =

American business executive (1922–2009)

Curtis Allina (August 15, 1922 – December 15, 2009) is credited with the addition of heads on the dispensers for Pez candy, a design feature implemented while he was an executive at Pez-Haas, then the name of the company that now makes Pez candy.

== Biography ==
Allina was born in Prague, in what was then the Czechoslovak Republic, and raised in Vienna, in what was then the First Austrian Republic. As a child, he lived across the street from Sigmund Freud and he and his friends would peer through the window watching the renowned doctor smoke a cigar while listening to his patients. However, Allina never believed in psychoanalysis.

A Sephardic Jew, he was imprisoned in various Nazi concentration camps, between the ages of 19-23. He was the sole survivor of his immediate family. He told stories of having barely survived random executions. After an attempted escape from one camp, a selection of prisoners were lined up; every third one was to be shot. A guard miscounted, and Allina survived. After another group of prisoners were caught trying to escape, Allina, who had been sent on an errand, was counted among the escapees. He was the final prisoner to have the hangman's noose placed around his neck, but at the last second that prison guard vouched for him, saving him for his usefulness in speaking Czech, German and Russian. This was the theme of his life, his ability to survive.

In the post-war period, he emigrated to the United States and settled in New York City. He learned English by watching Tom Mix movies over and over again. After working his way through the slaughterhouses in New York during the 1940s, he eventually found himself working for Pez Candy, a subsidiary of Haas Foods, an Austrian-based company. At that time, Pez was successful in Europe, but going nowhere in the U.S. Allina went from an on-foot sales rep. to running Pez's North American operations for nearly 30 years.

It wasn't until he had the idea of putting character heads on dispensers and filling them with child-friendly flavors that the company really took off. Allina is responsible for making Pez into the pop culture icon that it became. The first sculpted Pez dispensers (the candy had previously been distributed in tins and "regular" dispensers styled to resemble cigarette lighters) were introduced in 1955: Santa Claus, and a Robot.

His travels took him to the square in Cuba the day Fidel Castro marched in, and was present in Argentina listening amongst the crowds to Eva Perón's final speech. Later in his life, he participated in and was filmed for Steven Spielberg's Shoah project.

Allina opted to move to Washington State for the latter part of his life, saying he felt a calling to go there. Perhaps it reminded him of the countryside in Vienna where he spent his childhood.

Allina died at 87 in December, 2009. He lived in Olympia, Washington.
