= Hermine Zaynard =

Austrian political activist (1913–1943)

- Born: Hermine Schwarzer; 26 May 1913; Vienna, Austro-Hungarian empire
- Died: 19 November 1943 (aged 30); Vienna District Court house (execution cell), "Groß-Wien", Germany
- Occupations: Technical draftswoman Youth activist Communist activist Anti-government resistance activist
- Known for: the circumstances of her execution
- Political party: KPÖ
- Spouse: Leopold Zatnard (1916-1943)
- Children: none
- Parents: Heinrich Theodor Schwarzer (father); Hermine Schwarzer-Ott (mother)

Hermine Zaynard (born Hermine Schwarzer: 26 May 1913 - 19 November 1943) was an Austrian technical draftswomen who became a political activist, working with the Young Communists under Austro-Fascism. After Austria's incorporation into Hitler's new Germany in 1938, and the country's inclusion in the war which broke out the next year, she became an anti-government resistance activist. On 30 September 1943 Hermine Zaynard was convicted and sentenced by the special "People's Court" in Vienna. Her execution took place by decapitation, using the guillotine that had been installed at the Vienna District Court house five years earlier.

== Life ==
Hermine "Minkerl" Schwarzer was born in Vienna a year before the outbreak of the war that would put an end to the Austro-Hungarian empire. Heinrich Theodor Schwarzer, her father, was described in the court report of her trial in 1943 as "a house-painter's assistant". She attended primary school in Vienna and then completed a vocational secondary school training for work as a Kindergarten teacher. She was almost certainly still a teenager when she joined the "Red Falcons" ("Rote Falken"), an organisation with a strongly political (socialist) flavour which organised camping holidays and other leisure activities for young people. By 1933 she is described as an "official" of the movement. That year she took part in the "International Red Falcons Conference", held in Ostend, a port and coastal resort in the Flemish speaking northern half of Belgium. In 1934, the year both of the brief but brutal February uprising which presaged a further retreat from democracy in the country and of Hermine Schwarzer's twenty-first birthday, she teamed up with the Young Communists, becoming a local group leader for Vienna-Margareten ("Vienna 5"). The Dollfuss government, after March 1933 ruling not by democratic modalities but by decree, had determined that political activism - especially left-wing political activism - was illegal, however. Between 1934 and 1938 Hermine Schwarzer served three prison terms, together totalling thirty months.

In March 1938 she was released from the women's prison at Wiener Neudorf, a short distance to the south of Vienna. By this time she was already a member of the (illegal) Communist Party, and she was assigned the highly dangerous work of creating and maintaining contacts between the leadership cells on the various regions of Austria. Meanwhile she supported herself with office work as a technical draftswoman. She also found time to attend evening classes at a "Maturaschule", a college preparing post-school students for the secondary school leaving exam which, once passed, would normally have opened the way to a university-level education.

Hermine Schwarzer married Leopold Zaynard in 1940. He was a typesetter by trade. It was, however, on account of their shared involvement as anti-government resistance activists that they had met and become close. At some point over the next couple of years Leopold Zaynard became a (very reluctant) member of the German wartime army.

On 29 April 1942 Hermine Zaynard-Schwarzer was arrested. By the time her case came to trial, in September/October 1943, her husband had already been tried and convicted by a Court Martial in December 1942 and executed on 5 or 6 March 1943. The civilian justice process faced by Hermine rolled more slowly but, in the event, no less brutally. The case opened on 30 September 1943 in the "People's Court" at Vienna. "People's Courts" had been revived and "brought up to date" by the Hitler government after 1933 in order to deal with cases determined to be of a "political" nature. Zaynard-Schwarzer was one of four defendants on trial before "senate president" Dr. Kurt Albrecht.

Two of the accused prisoners faced the double charge of "Advantaging the enemy and preparing to commit high treason" ("Feindbeguenstugung und Vorbereitung sum Hichverrat"). Hermine Zaynard-Schwarzer was one of the two: her party comrade Friedrich Hedrich was the other. The "High treason" charge was the usual one in trials of this nature. "Advantaging the enemy" was a slightly less usual accusation, and generally implied trying to persuade soldiers in the German army to desert. It was the charge on which Leopold Zaynard had been convicted and sentenced to death earlier in the year.

The kernel of the case against "the widow Zaynard", as the court record repeatedly identifies her, was that she had arranged accommodation in Vienna for Julius Kornweitz (1911-1944), a "foreign communist" (Note: The parents of Julius Kornweitz appear to have been born respectively in Ukraine and in Poland.) and a "senior communist official" who had been smuggled into Austria in 1941 to rebuild a national leadership structure for the illegal Communist Party of Austria. It was alleged that she had been involved in arranging and then facilitating a succession of meetings between Kornweitz and her late husband.

The court sentenced Hermine Zaynard and Friedrich Hedrich to death following a brief trial on 30 September 1943. Their two co-accused, Hedrich's wife Erna and Margarete Bronobhadny (who had no previous court record of political dissent) were also deemed to have been complicit, but they received only lengthy jail sentences. All four received the usual deprivation of civil rights ("Ehrenrechtsverlus") until their sentences had been expunged. A plea for clemency was rejected by Justice Minister Thierack on 1 November 1943. Hermine Zaynard-Schwarzer was executed in the special execution cell at the Vienna District Court house on 19 November 1943. The execution of Friedrich Hedrich followed three months later.

== Mother ==
Hermine Zaynard's mother, also called Hermine Schwarzer, had been arrested on 17 March 1943 "on suspicion of communist activities". It seems likely that she had been arrested on suspicion of having been involved in her daughter's political activities. According to one source she was charged with "preparing to commit high treason and distributing illegal leaflets". However, there is no record of her having actually faced trial, so presumably the security services never obtained the level of evidence that would have been necessary "safely" to secure her conviction. Nevertheless, Hermine Schwarzer (mother) remained under suspicion so could not be released. Instead, after two months in custody in Vienna, she was transferred to the women's concentration camp at Ravensbrück, a short distance to the north of Berlin, where she was detained till May 1945.

== Celebration ==
At the start of October 1943 Hermine Zaynard wrote a letter to her father, her parents-in-law, "sweet Liesserl" (possibly a sister) "and all others who have lived me". Presumably her mother was excluded from the addressees because, being locked away in the women's concentration camp, her mother was not expected to get a chance to read it. The letter indicates that Hermine Zaynard was reconciled to the prospect that she would soon be executed, though she still hoped that she might somehow avoid such a fate. Although she has her own grave memorial at the Vienna's vast (and misleadingly named) "Central Cemetery", for many purposes Hermine Zaynard's most effective memorial is probably the letter which she herself wrote to her family just over six weeks before her execution.
