= The Journal of Membrane Biology =

- Discipline: Membrane biology
- Language: English
- Edited by: Amitabha Chattopadhyay, Hyderabad, India

Publication details
- History: 1969-present
- Publisher: Springer Science+Business Media
- Frequency: Bi-Monthly
- Impact factor: 2.3 (2023)

Standard abbreviations
- ISO 4: J. Membr. Biol.

Indexing
- CODEN: MBBBO
- ISSN: 0022-2631 (print); 1432-1424 (web)
- LCCN: 76023326
- OCLC no.: 39931217

Links
- Journal homepage; Online archive

The Journal of Membrane Biology is a monthly peer-reviewed scientific journal on the nature, structure, genesis, and functions of biological membranes and on the physics and chemistry of artificial membranes with a bearing on biomembranes. According to the Journal Citation Reports, the journal has a 2022 impact factor of 2.4.
