= Burlingame Museum of Pez Memorabilia =

California museum (1995–2019)

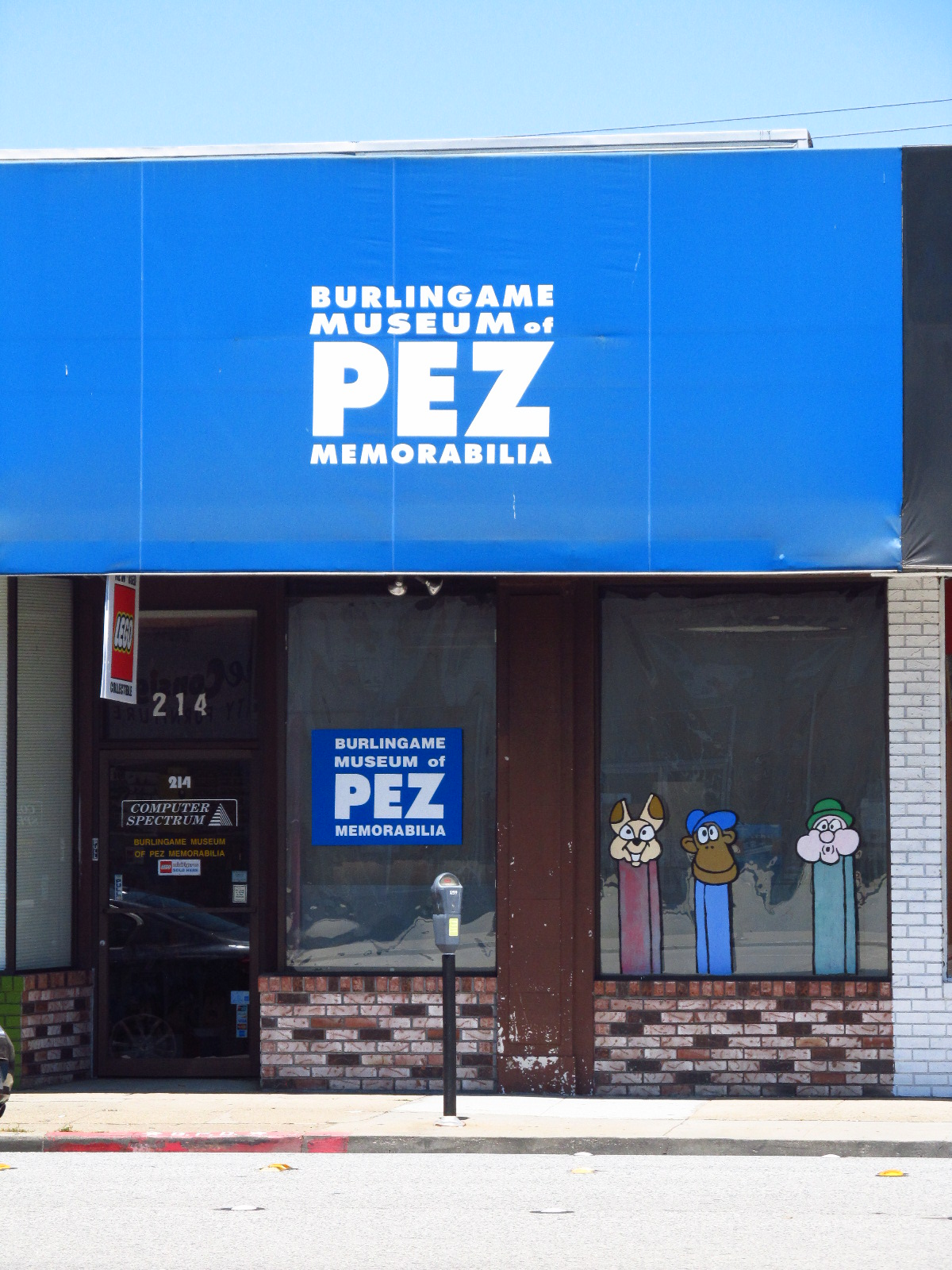
- Exterior view of museum
- Established: 1995
- Dissolved: 2019
- Location: Burlingame, California
- Coordinates: 37°34′45″N 122°20′39″W
- Collections: Pez dispensers
- Founders: Gary and Nancy Doss

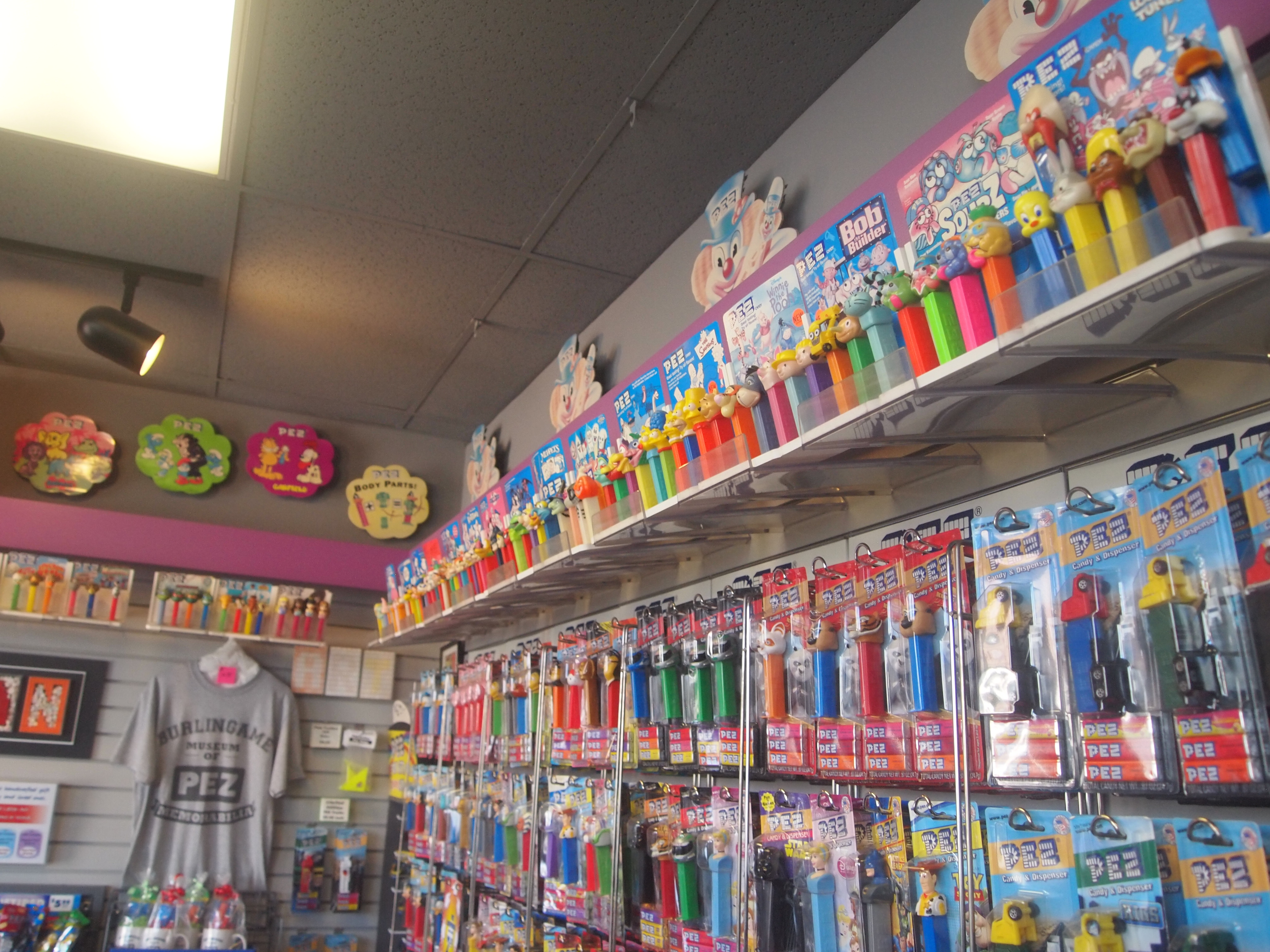
Interior view of museum

The Burlingame Museum of Pez Memorabilia in Burlingame, California, opened in 1995 and was run by Gary and Nancy Doss, who had been collecting Pez dispensers for more than a decade. The Doss couple initially ran a computer store and displayed some of their dispensers in the store, when they discovered that customers were more interested in the dispensers than in the computers. The museum claimed to have an example of every Pez dispenser ever sold, including a Wonder Woman dispenser autographed by Lynda Carter and a Garfield dispenser autographed by Jim Davis.

In 2004, the museum expanded and added the Classic Toy Museum which featured well-known toys and related memorabilia. Toys on display included Tinker Toys, Erector Sets, Lincoln Logs, Mr. Potato Head, View-Masters, Colorforms, Lego, Play-Doh, Slinkys, and more. Part of the display included the Banned Toys Museum, which featured toys that were recalled or banned for a variety of reasons, such as for safety or appropriateness.

In 2009, the Pez company sued the museum for trademark infringement and demanded all profits from the museum's 14 years in business. The suit was settled out of court in 2010 and the museum was allowed to stay open.

The museum permanently closed in July 2019.
