= Steffi Kunke =

Austrian teacher and anti-fascist activist (1908–1942)

- Born: Steffi Jelinek; 26 December 1908; Vienna, Austria-Hungary
- Died: 14 February 1943 (aged 34); Auschwitz-Birkenau concentration camp, German occupied Poland
- Occupations: Teacher, socialist and anti-fascist activist
- Spouse: Hans Kunke

Steffi Kunke (née Jelinek, 26 December 1908 – 14 February 1943) was an Austrian teacher and socialist who was involved in the anti-fascist underground in Vienna during World War II. She died in Auschwitz-Birkenau concentration camp.

== Biography ==
Kunke was born on 26 December 1908 in Vienna, Austria-Hungary. Her parents Ignaz Jellinek and Marie Jellinek (née Ourednik) were of Czech background. She married Hans Kunke (1906–1940), who was Jewish. He worked for the Municipal Insurance Institution. She worked as a teacher and composed music with her husband.

From 1934, Kunke was a member of the Central Committee of the Revolutionary Socialist Youth. Kunke and her husband were arrested in July 1936 by the Viennese police for distributing socialist and anti-fascist literature and she was sentenced to 7 months in prison.

After the Anschluss (annexation of Austria into Nazi Germany), Kunke was summoned before the Gestapo who interrogated her and "strongly advised" her to divorce her Jewish husband. She remained married and operating as a leading functionary of the now illegal Revolutionary Socialist Youth organisation.

Josef Buttinger procured false papers for Kunke and her husband to flee from Nazi occupied Austria, but they chose to remain in Vienna until their close friend Ferdinand Tschürtsch received his own papers. In May 1938, all three were arrested and Kunke was transported to the Lichtenburg concentration camp. She was among the first known female Revolutionary Socialist member to be arrested.

From Lichtenbug, Kunke was sent to Ravensbrück concentration camp for women in May 1939. At Ravensbrück, Kunke suffered repeated solitary confinement. She was whipped under orders from Heinrich Himmler for not denouncing another political prisoner then was held in the Strafblock (a punishment block located next to the gas chambers) where she was forced to undertake hard construction labour. She was sent from Ravensbrück to Auschwitz-Birkenau concentration camp in 1942.

Kunke died in Auschwitz-Birkenau on 14 February 1943. Some sources state she died of typhus while others that she was beaten to death by Schutzstaffel (SS) Obersturmbannführer Otto Max Koegel. Her husband had died in Buchenwald in 1940.

== Legacy ==
Some of the letters written by Kunke to her aunt Flora Jelinek have survived and are held in the Michel Brisebois collection at McMaster University in Hamilton, Ontario, Canada.

Honorary graves for Kunke and her husband have been erected at the Hietzing Cemetery in Vienna.

In 1954, the street Kunkegasse in Vienna was named in Kunke and her husband's honour.
