= Thila Plaichinger =

Austrian opera singer (1868–1939)

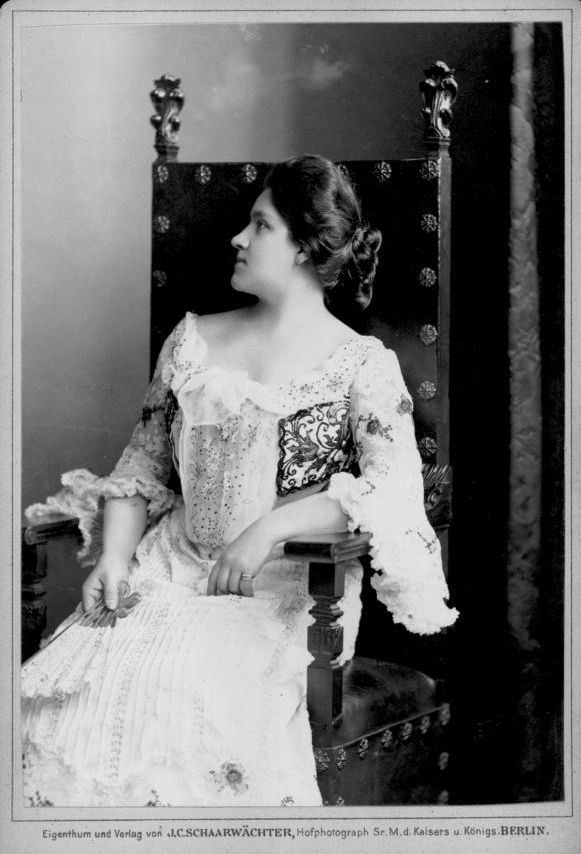
- Born: Mathilde Plaichinger; 14 March 1868; Vienna, Austria-Hungary
- Died: 19 March 1939 (aged 71); Vienna, Nazi Germany

Mathilde Plaichinger, known as Thila Plaichinger (14 March 1868 – 19 March 1939) was an Austrian opera singer of the soprano, who made an international career as a dramatic artist.

== Life ==
Plaichinger's father was a school director and director of a church choir. She studied at the Vienna Conservatory primarily with Josef Gänsbacher, also with Louise Dustmann-Meyer and Emma Mampe-Babnigg. From 1894 to 1901 Plaichinger was a member of the ensemble of the Stadttheater in Strasbourg, specializing in highly dramatic soprano. In 1895 and 1896 she was invited as a guest to the Mannheim Court Theater. In 1897 she took part in smaller roles at the Bayreuth Festival - as Rossweiße, 1st Norn and flower girl. From 1900 to 1914 she belonged to the ensemble of the Berlin Court Opera. Plaichinger was also able to make guest appearances in several European cities. She received invitations to Munich, where she sang at the Wagner Festival from 1901 to 1911 and at the Royal Court Opera from 1904 to 1909. In 1904 she embodied three Wagner heroines, Isolde, Venus and Ortrud, at the London opera house Covent Garden. In 1910, Plaichinger returned for the English premiere of Elektra and also took over the roles of Tannhäuser-Elisabeth and Isolde again. She also sang Elektra in December 1909 in Vienna and in 1910 in the Dutch premiere of the opera in The Hague. She was married to the concert singer Gustav Friedrich . From 1910 she worked in Berlin and later in Rodaun near Vienna as a singing teacher.
