= Marlene Engelhorn =

German-Austrian activist (born 1992)

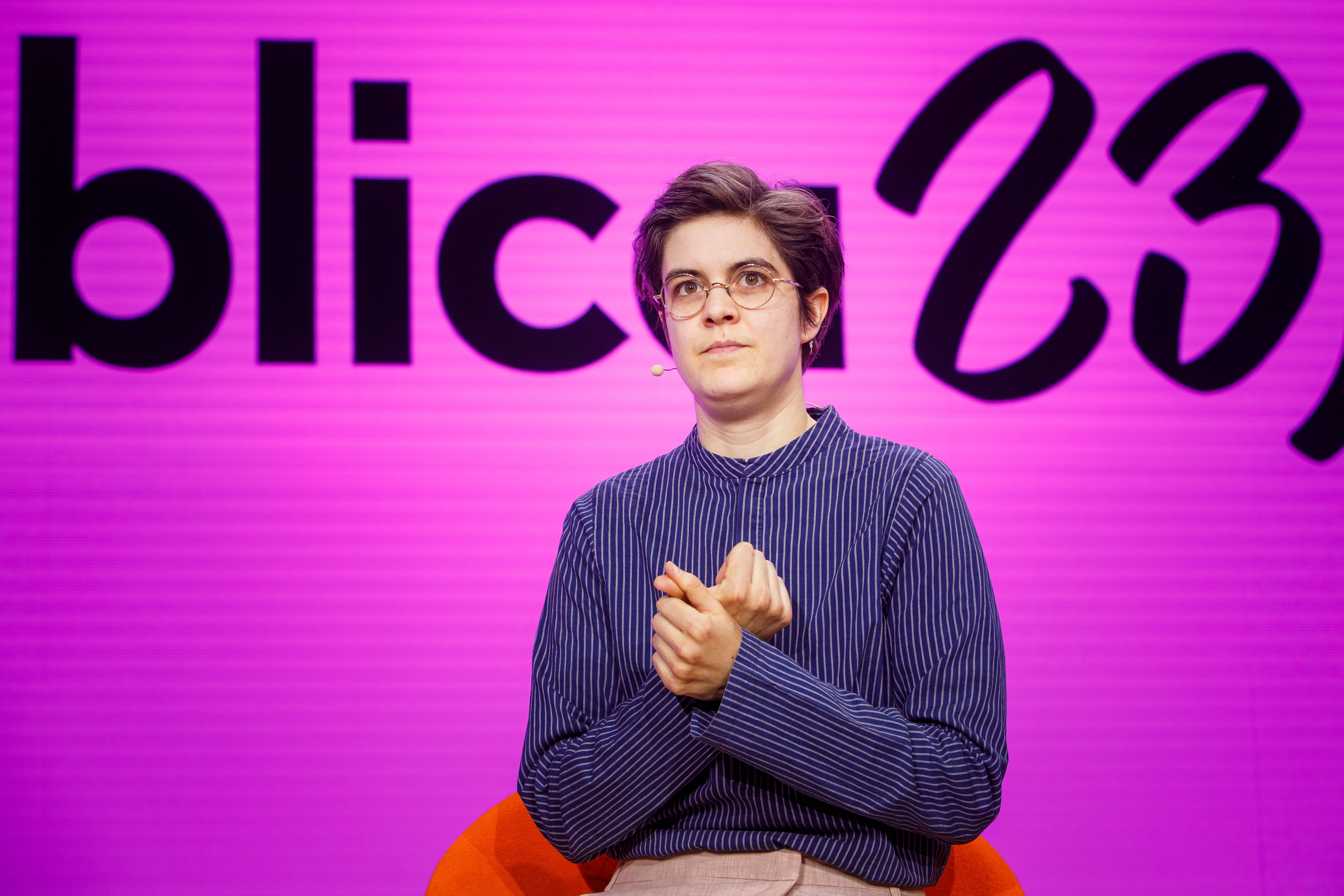
- Marlene Engelhorn at Re:publica in 2023
- Born: 1992 (age 33–34); Vienna, Austria
- Education: University of Vienna (BA)
- Occupations: Activist; philanthropist
- Known for: Advocacy for inheritance tax policies and gay rights
- Notable work: Geld
- Awards: Human Act Award (2022)

Marlene Engelhorn (born 1992) is an Austrian and German activist and heiress known for advocating the reform of inheritance tax policies.

A descendant of Friedrich Engelhorn from the family who founded the chemical industry concern BASF and granddaughter of Peter Engelhorn, Engelhorn inherited a considerable fortune from her grandmother, Traudl Engelhorn-Vechiatto, whose wealth was estimated at $4.2bn (€3.8bn). She gained media attention after saying in an interview that she was in favour of wealth tax and willing to be taxed at 90% on her inheritance or to donate 90% of her wealth. In 2024, she did the latter.

Engelhorn is also the founder of Tax me now, a German initiative lobbying for higher taxes on the wealthy.

== Early life and education ==
A descendant of Friedrich Engelhorn from the family who founded the chemical industry concern BASF, and the granddaughter of Peter Engelhorn and Traudl Engelhorn-Vechiatto, Marlene Engelhorn was born in Vienna in 1992. Like many from the local bourgeoisie, she studied in the Lycée Français de Vienne. She has maintained privacy regarding her parents and immediate family.

She studied German language and literature at the University of Vienna, but left the university between 2015 and 2019 in order to teach, translate, and tutor. She returned in 2019 and received her bachelor's degree in 2021. She would like to work as proofreader for a publishing company.

== Activism ==
She mentioned she became aware of her wealth situation at the university, when she was in contact with ″normal″ people.

In 2021, she discovered she was going to inherit directly from her grandmother, Traudl Engelhorn-Vechiatto, whose wealth was estimated at $4.2bn (€3.8bn). Marlene Engelhorn said she wanted the Austrian state to tax her at 90%, as this inheritance seemed "unfair" to her because she had not worked for it. However, there is no tax on inheritance in Austria.

She founded the group Tax me now in Germany in 2021 to lobby for higher taxes on the wealthy. In 2024, more than 250 people, including Abigail Disney, heiress from Disney family, Brian Cox, from HBO series Succession, and Valerie Rockefeller, had joined her in this initiative. They sent a letter to Davos Forum to ask for more taxes to millionaires.

Engelhorn's grandmother died in September 2022, and Engelhorn inherited around €25 million. Engelhorn said she would donate 90% of it. She then created a Council for Redistribution: after sending 10000 letters to Austrian citizens, 50 of them were selected to propose ideas which will benefit society in order to use Engelhorn's fortune. Work sessions were organized between March and June 2024 in Salzburg. Engelhorn did not have any decision power on the conclusion of the debates, and control of the funds went to an organisation named "the Good Council". In the end, the Council decided to redistribute the €25M to 77 organisations, including €50000 to Wikipedia.

In July 2025, Engelhorn estimated that one third of the funds which she gave to the "Good Council" had been distributed. She has continued her activism, and portrays herself in a play titled GELD IST KLASSE lit. 'money is great/class'. Although she continues to live off of what remains of her inheritance, she has stated her intent to be self-sufficient by 2026.

In August 2025, Engelhorn joined a flotilla bound for Gaza.

== Recognition ==
In 2022, the Human Act Award was awarded to Engelhorn for her advocacy of and her work towards wealth taxes in German-speaking Europe.

== Publications ==
- Engelhorn, Marlene (2022). Geld. Übermorgen. Wien: Verlag Kremayr & Scheriau GmbH & Co.KG. ISBN 978-3-218-01327-7.
