= Ken Jungwirth =

Australian rules footballer

Personal information
- Full name: Ken W. Jungwirth
- Born: 3 August 1946 (age 80)
- Original team: Murrumbeena High School
- Height: 183 cm (6 ft 0 in)
- Weight: 78.5 kg (173 lb)

Playing career^{1}
Years	Club	Games (Goals)
1966	Melbourne	4 (5)
1967	Carlton	1 (0)
Total		5 (5)
- ^{1} Playing statistics correct to the end of 1967.

Ken Jungwirth (born 3 August 1946) is a former Australian rules footballer who played with Melbourne and Carlton in the Victorian Football League (VFL).
