= Klaus Kubinger =

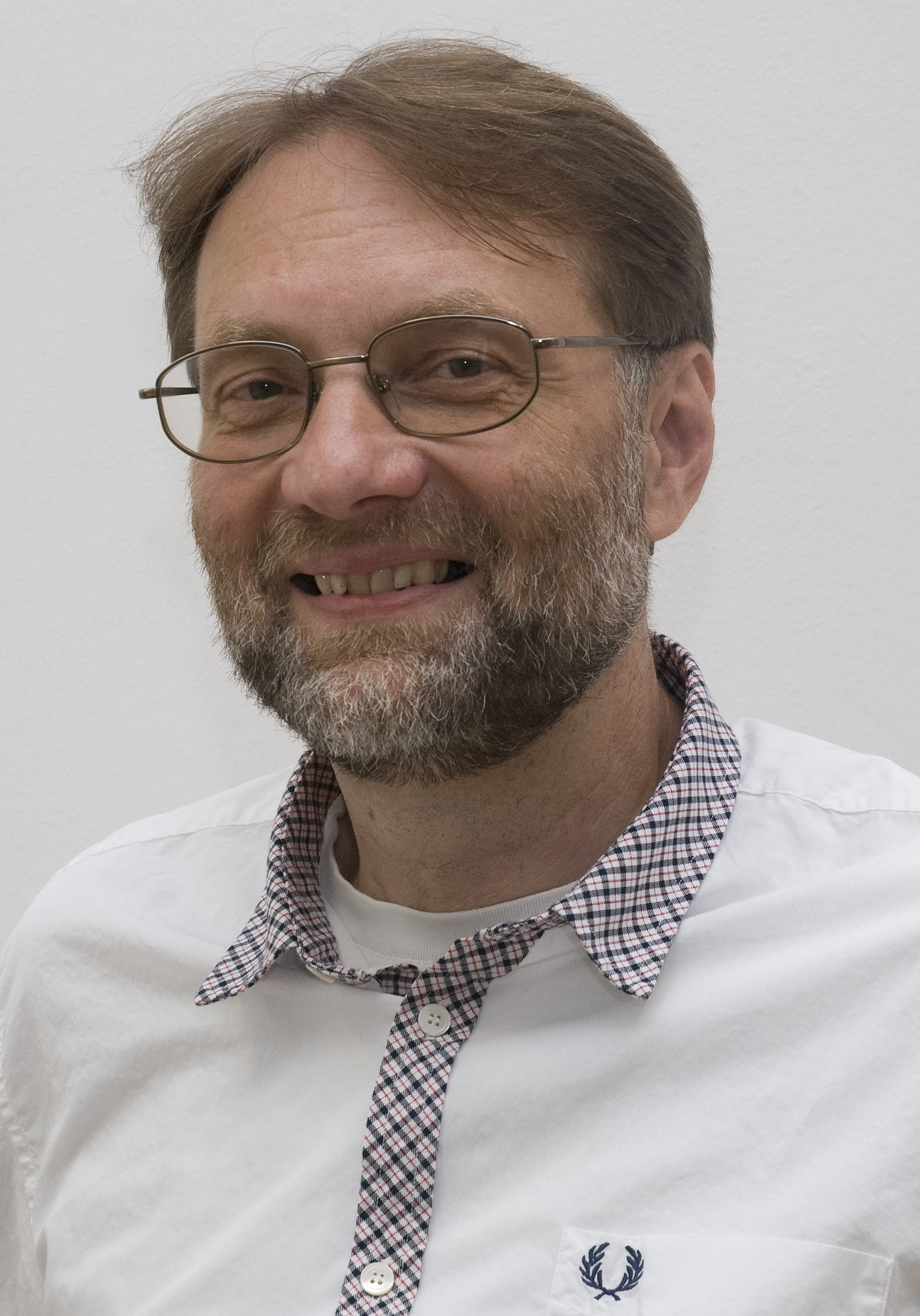
Klaus Kubinger in 2011

Klaus D. Kubinger (born May 25, 1949 in Vienna, Austria) is a psychologist as well as a statistician and has been until retirement professor for psychological assessment at the University of Vienna, Faculty of Psychology. His main research work focuses on fundamental research of assessment processes and on application and advancement of Item response theory models (Rasch model). He is also known as a textbook author of psychological assessment on the one hand and on statistics on the other hand.

== Biography ==
Klaus D. Kubinger received 1973 the doctor's degree in psychology (PhD) in Vienna, Austria, and became assistant professor. In 1985 he achieved the postdoctoral lecture qualification of psychology. Since then he was head of the examination subject psychological assessment at the University of Vienna. In 1989 he graduated as a MSc in statistics. In 1998 he was promoted to a full professor of psychological assessment. From this time on, he has been head of the division of psychological assessment and applied psychometrics, which includes a Center of Testing and Consulting.

In 1997 he earned the qualification of a systemic psychotherapist.

== Scientific Work ==
The beginning of Klaus D. Kubinger's career was characterized by applications of the Rasch model (Item response theory, IRT) on pertinent psychological tests. Then he developed a non-parametric discriminant analysis and an analysis of variance for a two-way layout for rank scaled data. Later on, the intelligence test-battery AID (Adaptives Intelligenz Diagnostikum has been established in German speaking countries and also exists in an English version (AID 3, Adaptive Intelligence Diagnosticum) since 2017. This test-battery is based on (optionally either branched- or tailored) adaptive testing. There have also been developed several objective personality tests sensu R.B. Cattell. Further on, his research work focused on fundamental research of assessment processes (fakeability of personality questionnaires, guessing effects in multiple choice tests, equivalency of computerized or in other cultures transposed tests) and on the elaboration of self-assessments for university students’ counseling. Besides this, he made, especially together with Dieter Rasch, contributions to statistics (for psychology), in particular to sequential testing and sample size planning. Still he works on the advancement and application of Item response theory models, in particular on the Rasch model including the Linear logistic test model (LLTM): on problems of model testing and problems of parameter estimation as well as on specific generalizations and on modelling the difficulty of various components of designing a task's item.

== Journal activities ==
- since 2003 Editor in Chief of Psychological Test and Assessment Modeling
- since 2005 Board member of Journal of Individual Differences
- since 2007 Board member of International Journal of Selection and Assessment

== Awards and honours ==
- 2007: Alfred-Binet-Award of the German Society of Psychology.
- 2009: Award of the European Association of Psychological Assessment for distinguished contributions to psychological assessment as a science in the years 2004-2008.
- 2010: Lifework Award for computerized psychological assessment of the German Society of Psychology.

== Publications ==
=== Books (selection) ===
- Kubinger, K. D. (ed.)(1989). Moderne Testtheorie - Ein Abriß samt neuesten Beiträgen [Modern psychometrics – A brief survey with recent contributions]. (2nd ed.). Munich: Psychologie Verlags Union. ISBN 3-407-86160-5
- Kubinger, K. D. (2019). Psychologische Diagnostik – Theorie und Praxis psychologischen Diagnostizierens [Psychological Assessment – Theory and Practice of Psychological Consulting] (3rd ed.). Göttingen: Hogrefe. ISBN 978-3-8017-2779-6
- Rasch, D., Kubinger, K. D. & Yanagida, T. (2011). Statistics in Psychology – Using R and Spss. Chichester: Wiley. ISBN 978-0-470-97124-6
- Kubinger, K. D., Frebort, M., Khorramdel, L. & Weitensfelder, L. ("Wiener Autorenkollektiv Studienberatungstests") (2012). Self-Assessment: Theorie und Konzepte [Self-Assessment: Theory and Concepts]. Lengerich: Pabst. ISBN 978-3899677829
- Ortner, T. M. & Kubinger, K. D. (eds.)(2021). Psychologische Diagnostik in Fallbeispielen [Case studies of psychological assessment]. Göttingen: Hogrefe. ISBN 978-3-8017-3110-6

=== Papers (since 2020, selection) ===
- Kubinger, K. D. (2021). Note: Reducing the risk of lucky guessing as well as avoiding the contamination of speed and power in (paper-pencil) group-testing – illustrated by a new test-battery. Psychological Test and As-sessment Modeling, 63, 458-468.
- Kubinger, K. D. & Suster, T. (2023). A reasonable approach to check a psychological test’s long ago standardiza-tion – applied for the Adaptive Intelligence Diagnosticum (AID 3). Psychological Test and Assessment Modeling, 65, 195-205.
- Bartok, L. & Kubinger, K. D. (2023). Conceptualization of a new Two-way Figural Reasoning-Test. Psychological Test and Assessment Modeling, 65, 321-338.
- Kubinger, K. D. & Gamsjäger, C. (2023). Conceptualization of the Reasoning-Test “(Mathematical) Equations”. Psychological Test and Assessment Modeling, 65, 339-353.
- Kubinger, K. D. & Heuberger, N. (2023). Conceptualization of the Reasoning-Test “Numerical Topologies”. Psychological Test and Assessment Modeling, 65, 354-387.
- Kubinger, K. D. (2023). On the dimensionality of Reasoning. Psychological Test and Assessment Modeling, 65, 437-447.
