= John Paul Blass =

Austrian physician and biochemist

John P. Blass, physician, biochemist and neurochemist, was born on February 21, 1937, in Vienna, Austria, and died on March 12, 2023, in New York City. Both his parents were physicians; his father, Gustaf Blass, was a prominent Viennese radiologist and his mother, Jolan Wirth Blass, a student of Sigmund Freud, was a psychoanalyst originally from Budapest. The family then moved to Stamford, Connecticut. Both parents practiced psychiatry, Gustaf in a private sanitarium in Stamford and Jolan as a child psychiatrist in New York City and Connecticut. He is survived by his wife, son and two granddaughters.

Blass's most prominent professional achievements were in the area of aging and Alzheimer's disease, in particular relating to brain metabolism. He was granted patents based on decades of scientific research, including a neutraceutical "metabolic enhancer" which has been under study in a large-scale, controlled, "multicenter" clinical trial.

He wrote and contributed to a number of books, including assorted volumes on Alzheimer's disease and a textbook on pharmacology.

== Education and institutional positions ==
Blass's studies brought him to Harvard College (summa cum laude, class of 1958, Harvard Scholar, Phi Beta Kappa (senior sixteen), Sigma Xi, biochemical sciences major); the University of London, where as a Marshall Scholar he earned his PhD in biochemistry (1960) under thesis professor and pioneer of modern neurochemistry Henry McIlwain; and to Columbia College of Physicians and Surgeons, where Blass earned his medical degree (Alpha Omega Alpha, class of 1965). During this time, he took a year off to do research as an American Cancer Society fellow in the laboratory of Dr. Heinrich Waelsch, another founding father of neurochemistry. Blass's internship and residency was in internal medicine at the Massachusetts General Hospital in Boston (1965–67).

He then spent three years (1967-1970) in the National Heart Institute at the National Institute of Health (NIH) (now the National Heart, Lung, and Blood Institute (NHLBI). From 1970 to 1978 he was assistant and associate professor of psychiatry and biochemistry at the UCLA Neuropsychiatric Institute. In 1978 he was appointed Winifred Masterson Burke Professor of Neurology and Medicine at Weill Medical College of Cornell University. Blass established and directed the Dementia Research Service, a combined research and clinical unit at a Cornell-affiliated institution, the Burke Medical Research Institute. He was also appointed in the field of Neurosciences.

He served on the National Panel on Alzheimer's Disease from 1986 to 1996 and was its chairman from 1986 to 1991. As a member of the National Institute on Aging, he was chairman of Geriatric Medicine Ad Hoc Review Committees from 1981 to 1984, and chairman of the Consensus Panel on Neurochemistry of Alzheimer's Disease in 1982. He served on the President's Department of Health and Human Services Task Force on Alzheimer's Disease in 1982–1984. He was president of the American Federation for Aging Research in 1994–1996. In 2005, he became emeritus professor at Cornell, and fully retired as of 2007.

In September 2007, the New York Academy of Sciences held a conference in honor of Blass, 'Mitochondria and Oxidative Stress in Neurodegenerative Disorders', also a satellite meeting of the International Society of Neurochemistry.

Also in 2007 the scientific journal Neurochemical Research published a special issue (Volume 32, Numbers 4-5, 775–781, doi:10.1007/s11064-006-9207-7) dedicated to Blass.

== Publications ==
Among Blass's roughly 200–250 publications, his papers in The New England Journal of Medicine are the most widely recognized, e.g. 'Abnormality of a thiamine-requiring enzyme in patients with Wernicke–Korsakoff syndrome' (New Eng J Med 1977; 297: 1367-1370, with Gary E. Gibson).

Blass was author of the textbook 'Concise Clinical Pharmacology: CNS Therapeutics' (2006, McGraw-Hill Education, ISBN 0-07-144036-4 (0-07-144036-4)); and co-author of Alzheimer's Disease: A Physician's Guide to Practical Management (with Ralph W. Richter, 2003, Humana Press, ISBN 0-89603-891-2 (0-89603-891-2)), Oxidative/Energy Metabolism in Neurodegenerative Disorders (with Fletcher H. McDowell, 1999, New York Academy of Sciences, ISBN 1-57331-209-6 (1-57331-209-6)), Alzheimer's Disease Vol. 1: New Treatment Strategies (with Zhaven Khachaturian, 1992, Dekker Incorporated, Marcel, ISBN 0-8247-8620-3 (0-8247-8620-3)), Caring for Alzheimer's Patients: A Guide for Family and Healthcare Providers (with Ralph W. Richter, 1989, Insight Productions, ISBN 0-306-43199-8 (0-306-43199-8)), and Principles of Geriatric Medicine and Gerontology (with Fletcher H. McDowell, 1989, McGraw-Hill Education, ISBN 0-07-027500-9 (0-07-027500-9) plus multiple subsequent editions with additional authors).

== Board, council, and society memberships ==
Blass served on the editorial boards of 17 journals, including the Journal of Neurochemistry. He was associate editor of the Journal of the American Geriatrics Society for five years. He served on a number of governmental review panels and other committees, including the Council of the National Institute on Aging. He was the first chair of the joint Presidential-Congressional Panel on Alzheimer's Disease and Related Disorders. Blass consulted for state governments and for private foundations in the US and Europe. He was a past president of the American Federation of Aging Research, and remained on its board since its founding. His academic honors include several visiting professorships. He served as a member of the council of both the American Society for Neurochemistry and the International Society for Neurochemistry. He belonged to a number of other scholarly societies, including the American Society for Clinical Investigation, the American Society of Biochemistry and Molecular Biology (https://www.asbmb.org/), Phi Beta Kappa, Sigma Xi, and Alpha Omega Alpha.

== Research, laboratory focus, and projects ==
Regarding his research, in 2005 Blass wrote: "One of the things that happens in Alzheimer's disease and a number of other neurological diseases is a decrease in the brain's ability to burn its fuels with the usual speed and efficiency. My laboratory was particularly interested in diseases affecting the brain's ability to burn its major fuel, sugar. These diseases affect the power plants of the cell (mitochondria) and specifically a part of the mitochondria, namely the Krebs tricarboxylic acid cycle. My coworkers and I were among the first researchers to study the abnormalities in mitochondria in the Alzheimer brain. Our discoveries led me to develop a patented nutraceutical preparation that appeared to slow or stop the progression of Alzheimer's disease, in a small but rigorous study. As emeritus professor, my current focus is further development and clinical testing of this and related preparations designed to help people with Alzheimer disease and other diseases that cause degeneration of the brain."

Blass's research concentrated on brain metabolism and metabolic diseases of the brain, particularly diseases affecting the mitochondria and specifically the Krebs tricarboxylic acid cycle. Blass's interest in this topic began at NIH, where he described the first hereditary defect in a major enzyme of human oxidative/energy metabolism, pyruvate dehydrogenase deficiency. Since moving to Cornell, his work concentrated on Alzheimer Disease and other neurodegenerative diseases. He and his coworkers pioneered the finding that inherent abnormalities of mitochondrial components occur in Alzheimer brain and other Alzheimer tissues and the implications of that finding for the pathophysiology of the dementia. He also published on clinical aspects of Alzheimer's disease and other causes of cognitive impairment.

In his later years, Blass was involved in developing a nutraceutical "metabolic enhancer" which appeared to slow the progression of Alzheimer's disease and related disorders in a relatively small placebo-controlled clinical trials and is under study in a larger multicenter trial. Cornell devolved the patent for this invention on him.
