= Josef Jungwirth =

Austrian painter

- Born: February 19, 1869; Vienna, Austria-Hungary
- Died: April 27, 1950 (aged 81); Södertörn, Sweden
- Education: Academy of Fine Arts Vienna
- Known for: Painting
- Movement: Impressionism

Josef Jungwirth (19 February 1869 – 27 April 1950) was an Austrian impressionist painter and professor at the Academy of Fine Arts Vienna.

== Early life and education ==
Jungwirth was born in Vienna to a construction foreman and a home worker. He trained as a porcelain painter under masters Josef Zeithammel and Wurm. In 1888, he began studying at the Academy of Fine Arts Vienna, where his teachers included August Eisenmenger, Siegmund L'Allemand, and Kazimierz Pochwalski. He also attended drawing classes under Joseph Eugen Hörwarter in Vienna before further studies at Heinrich Knirr's academy in Munich. Jungwirth's professors recommended him to the heir to the throne, Archduke Franz Ferdinand of Austria-Este, who invited him to join a study trip to Dalmatia in 1901. Jungwirth had already traveled to Italy in 1900.

== Career ==
In 1902, Jungwirth became a member of the Vienna Künstlerhaus and later joined the artists' group "Alte Welt". In 1905, he won the Kaiserpreis, a prestigious award funded by Emperor Franz Joseph I worth 400 ducats. That year, his painting Junges Volk (Young People) was purchased by Emperor Franz Joseph, which helped secure further commissions for Jungwirth.

Between 1903 and 1905, Jungwirth lived in the artists' colony in Berg near Böheimkirchen, Lower Austria. In 1906, he moved to Vienna and began teaching at the Academy of Fine Arts Vienna in 1910. He led the master's class at the academy from 1921 to 1934, and served as rector from 1929 to 1931. He was made an honorary member of the academy in 1934 upon his retirement at the age of 65. In 1944, Jungwirth was awarded the Goethe Medal for Art and Science in recognition of his contributions to art. The Völkischer Beobachter, a prominent publication at the time, marked his 75th birthday with an article about his life and exhibitions, including one at the House of German Art in Munich in 1938.

In 1946, at the age of 77, Jungwirth moved to Stockholm to live with his children. He died there in Södertörn in 1950 at the age of 82. He was working on his memoirs at the time of his death, but they were never published.

== Works (selection) ==
- 1902: Junges Volk
- 1905: Heimatlied
- Stadt und Land bekränzen das Wappen Niederösterreichs
- 1907: Primavera
- 1909: Eine Sitzung des niederösterreichischen Landtages 1908 (a 6-meter wide painting with 120 life-size portraits)
- 1914: Der Überfall von Hochkirch, for the Hofburg in Vienna
- 1930: Ansicht von Stockholm
- Numerous portraits, including of Archduke Franz Ferdinand of Austria, Archduke Otto Franz Joseph of Austria, and Karl Lueger

Jungwirth was primarily known as a still-life and landscape painter, heavily influenced by Impressionism, but he was also a recognized portrait artist. His genre and historical paintings earned him multiple accolades.

== Gallery ==
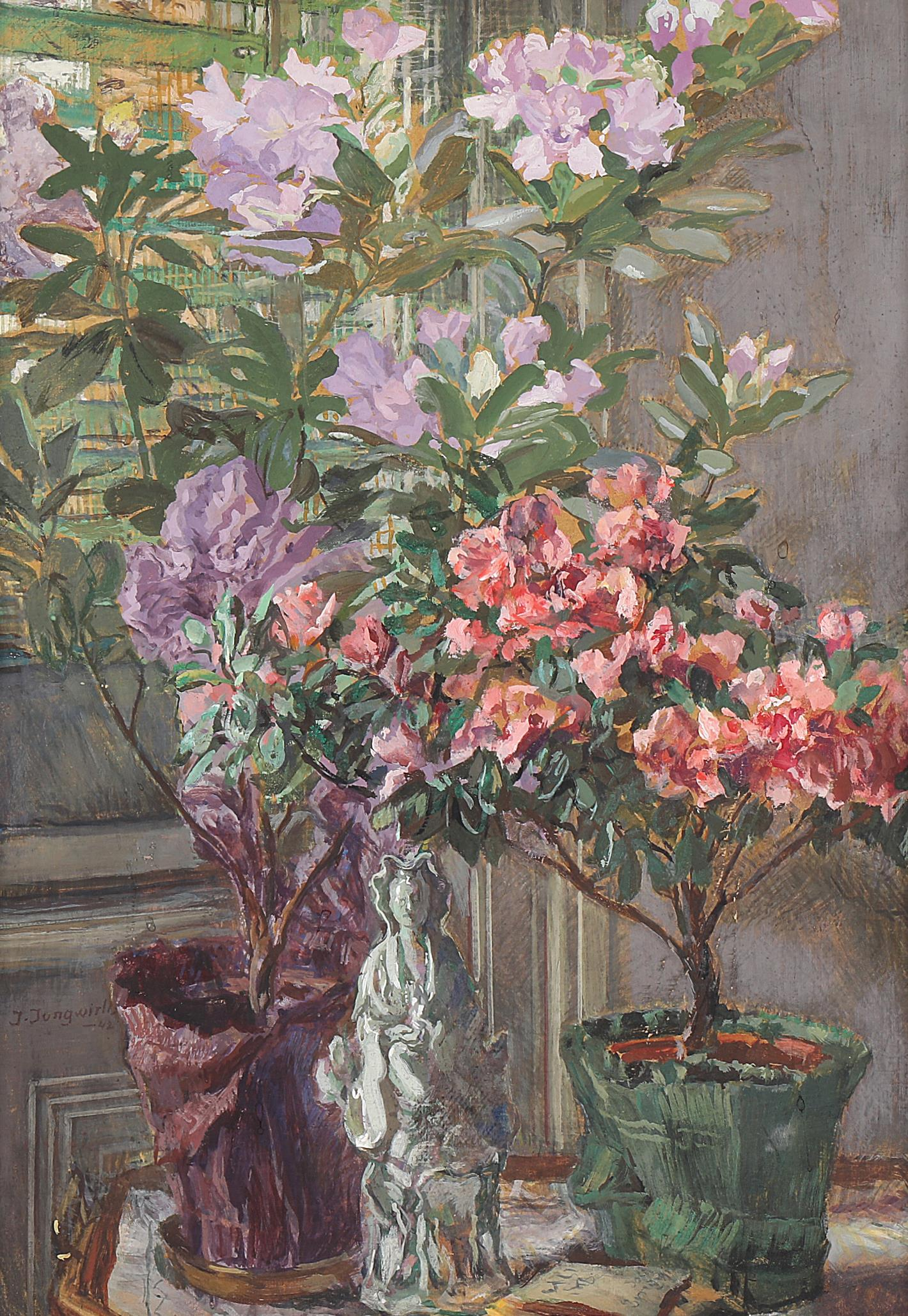
Oleander und Azaleen, 1942

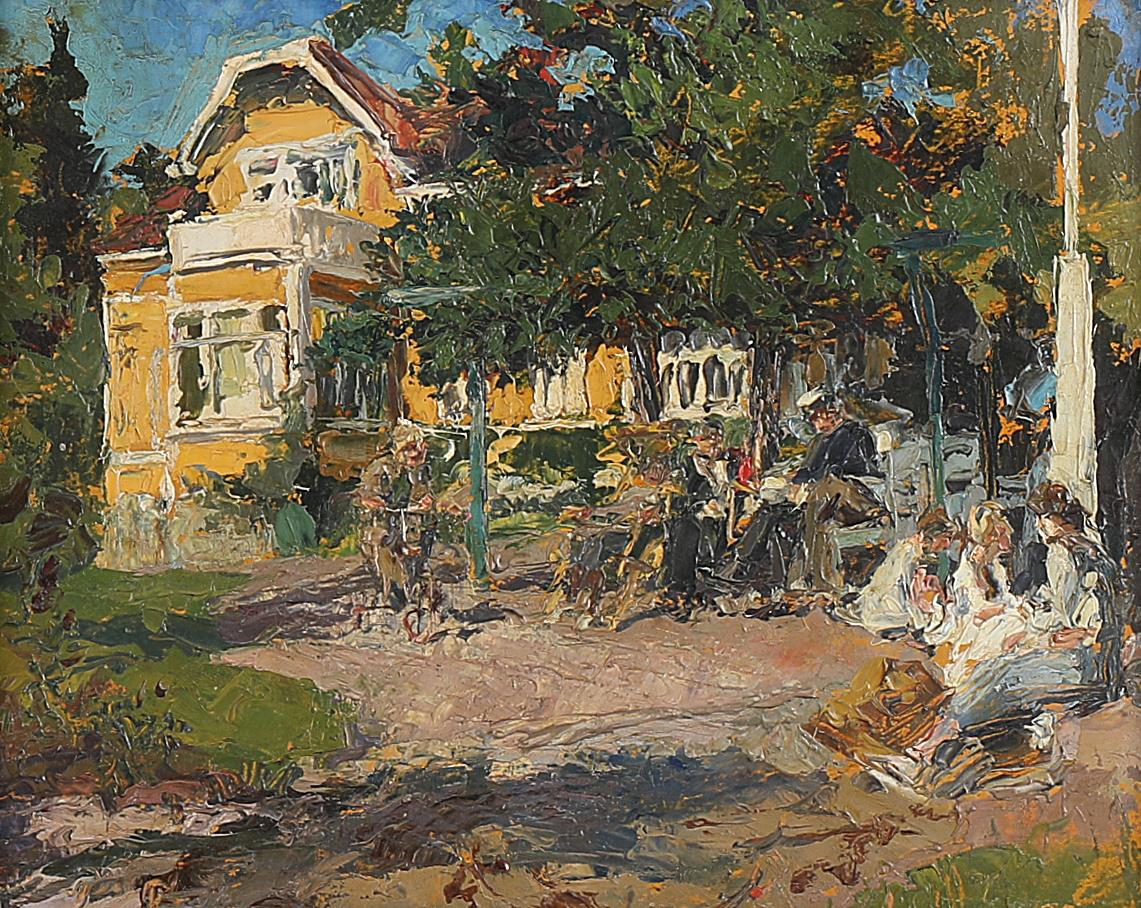
Villa Vårbacka, 1933

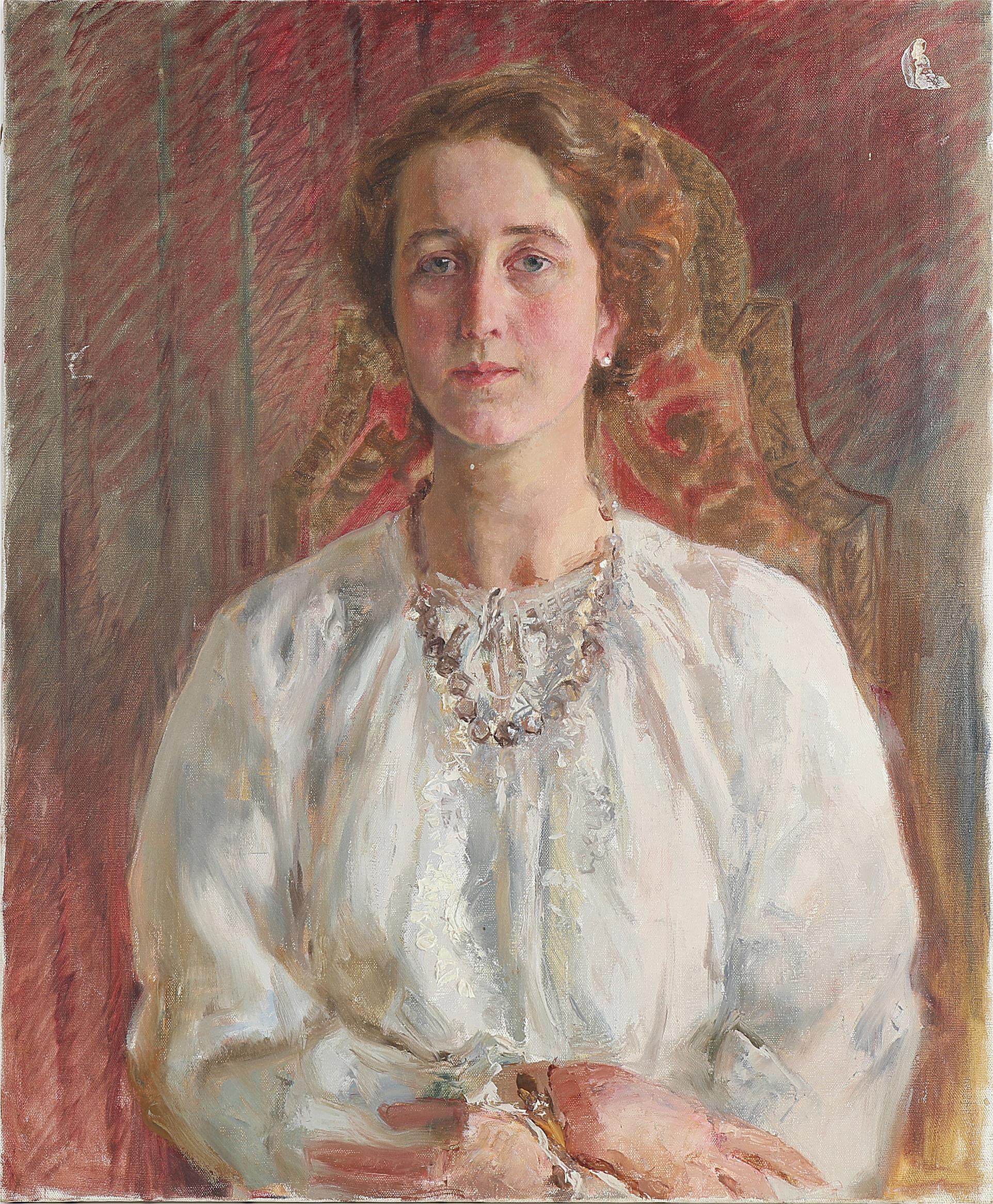
Dame mit Perlenkette und Ohrring, before 1950

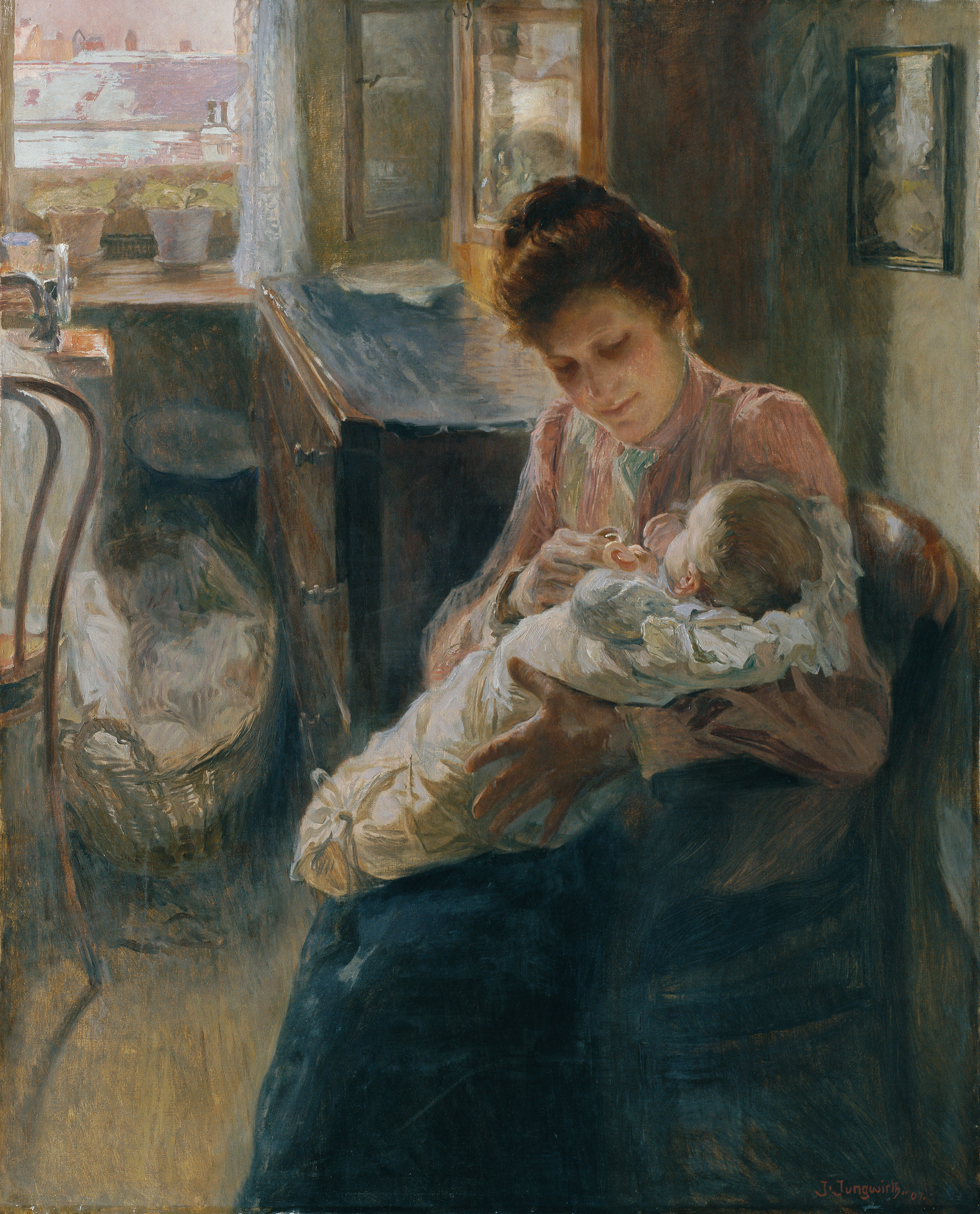
Junge Mutter, 1907

== Awards and recognition ==
- Prix de Rome (Rome Prize)
- 1905: Small Gold State Medal
- 1905: Kaiserpreis (Art)
- Large Gold Medal, St. Petersburg
- Archduke Karl Ludwig Medal
- 1909: Large Gold State Medal
- 1943: Grand Decoration of Honor for Services
- 1944: Goethe Medal for Art and Science

== Literature ==
- Ulrich Thieme and Felix Becker. Thieme-Becker. Vol. 19. pp. 332–333.
- Allgemeines Lexikon der bildenden Künstler des XX. Jahrhunderts. Vol. 2. pp. 580–581.
- "Jungwirth, Josef". In: Österreichisches Biographisches Lexikon 1815–1950 (ÖBL). Vol. 3, Austrian Academy of Sciences, Vienna 1965, p. 152–1.
- Hermann Clemens Kosel: Deutsch-österreichisches Künstler- und Schriftsteller-Lexikon. 2 volumes. Biographien der Wiener Künstler und Schriftsteller. Verlag der Gesellschaft für Graphische Industrie, Vienna 1902–1906.
- Heinrich Fuchs (1972–1974). Die österreichischen Maler des 19. Jahrhunderts. Vol. 2. Heinrich Fuchs Selbstverlag. p. 176.
