= Loathsome Women =

1959 book by Leopold Stein and Martha Alexander

- Book cover
- Author: Leopold Stein; Martha Alexander
- Language: English
- Genre: Non-fiction, psychology
- Publisher: McGraw-Hill Book Company
- Publication date: April 30, 1959
- Publication place: United States
- Pages: 243

Loathsome Women is a 1959 non-fiction book published April 30, 1959 by Viennese Dr. Leopold Stein with Martha Alexander.

The book was also published under the title, Anatomy of Love.

== Overview ==
A quartet of case histories of four imagined women, Sybil, Judith, Daphne, Dora, who may have the personalities of modern-day witches, for which the author states in the book, "I have divided my material into four categories and illustrated each category with one synthesized woman who is all these patients and yet no specific one of them."

== Critical reception ==
The New York Times, "Most interesting reading. Not, however, entirely convincing reading."

Commentary, "A mockery of the entire psychoanalytic movement."

Kirkus Reviews, "One may question the advisability of presenting clinical material in a popular form; the title in any case may help to alienate an audience."
