= Eduard Haas =

Austrian businessman

Eduard Haas III (1897–1989) was an Austrian businessman. In 1927, Haas developed the Pez confectionery.

== Biography ==
Haas was born at Leonding near Linz in Austria-Hungary into a rich family. His grandfather was a doctor and his father Eduard Haas II owned a flourishing grocery store.

As an adolescent, Haas patented a light baking powder mixture for Gugelhupf cakes, developed after a recipe left by his grandfather. The small "Hasin" powder bags soon were sold all over the Austro-Hungarian Monarchy.

In the 1920s, Haas began to purchase peppermint oil from a chemist, and with it, he created in 1927 the small, flat, minty candy known as Pez (the name was coined from "Pfefferminz", the German word for peppermint). Pez gradually gained popularity as a smoking cessation mint; however, Haas decided to broaden the appeal of Pez. After World War II, Haas and colleagues developed small dispensers shaped like lighters; the Pez dispenser debuted in 1947.

In 1952, Haas shifted his base to New York City where he developed a fresh marketing scheme aimed at children. The new Pez featured varying dispensers with popular figures as "flaps" and colored mints. To this day, Pez dispensers are sought out as collector's items.

== Death ==
He died in Vienna, Austria on 13 October 1986.

== Sources ==
- Edward Haas at the Inventor of the Week Archive
