= Pez =

Austrian brand of candy and dispensers

- Type: Candy
- Place of origin: Austria
- Region or state: Upper Austria
- Created by: Eduard Haas III
- Invented: 1927; 99 years ago
- Main ingredients: Sugar, corn syrup, plant-based fat, flavorings and colorings
- Variations: Peppermint, Grape, Cherry, Orange, Lemon, Strawberry, Raspberry, Cola, Sugar Cookie, Fizzy, Sours, Candy Corn, Cotton Candy, Vanilla Cupcake, Banana, Lychee, Mango, Coconut, Chocolate, Dragon Fruit, Cranberry, Mandarin
- Food energy (per 8.5 g (1 roll) serving): 34.4 kcal (144 kJ)
Nutritional value
(per 8.5 g (1 roll) serving)
- Protein: 0 g
- Fat: 0 g
- Carbohydrate: 7.9 g
- Other information: pez-candy.com

Pez (English: /pɛz/, German: [peːts]; stylised in all caps; from German Pfefferminz, meaning "peppermint") is the brand name of an Austrian candy and associated manual candy dispensers. The candy is a pressed, dry, straight-edged, curved-corner block 15 mm x 8mm x 5mm (5/8" x 5/16" x 3/16") (length x width x height), with each Pez dispenser holding 12 candy pieces.

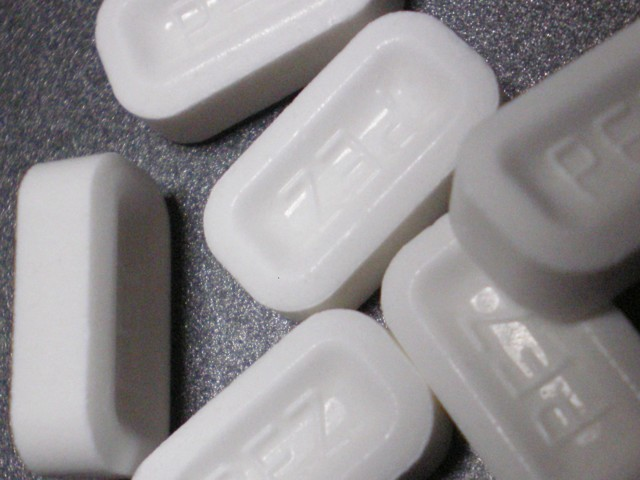
PEZ candy pieces

Pez was invented in Austria and later exported worldwide. The all-uppercase spelling of the logo echoes the trademark's style on the packaging and the dispensers, with the logo drawn in perspective and giving the appearance that the letters are built out of 44 brick-like Pez mints (14 bricks in the P and 15 in each of the E and Z).

Despite the widespread recognition and popularity of the Pez dispenser, the company considers itself to be primarily a candy company, stating that "[t]oday, billions of PEZ candies are consumed annually in the U.S.A. alone". Pez dispensers are a part of popular culture in many nations, an example being "Soul Candy" in the Japanese manga series Bleach. Because of the large number of dispenser designs over the years, they are collected by many.

== History ==
PEZ was first marketed as a compressed peppermint sweet in Vienna, Austria, in 1927 by Eduard Haas III. The name PEZ is an abbreviation of PfeffErminZ (German for peppermint). The original product was a round peppermint lozenge called PEZ drops. Over time, a new manufacturing process evolved and the hard pressed brick shape known today was created. The product packaging evolved from wrapped rolls to a small tin to hold the mints, similar to the modern Altoids tins. The first PEZ mint dispensers, known as "regulars", were similar in shape to a cigarette lighter and dispensed an adult breath mint marketed as an alternative to tobacco. They were invented by Oscar Uxa. Haas Food Manufacturing Corporation of Vienna was the first to sell PEZ products.

World War II slowed marketing and production. In 1945, manufacturers devised and promoted the Pez Box Regular. In 1949 the first dispenser was officially introduced at the Vienna Trade Fair. In 1952 Eduard Haas introduced his product to the United States, and Curtis Allina headed Pez's US business. In 1955, the Pez company placed heads on the dispensers and marketed them for children. Santa Claus, Popeye, Mickey Mouse and Donald Duck were among the first character dispensers. Since 1950, over 1500 Pez dispensers, including the original character dispensers, have been created.

Pez vending machines were used in Germany, Switzerland and Austria. The first German machines were introduced around 1954 and were produced by DWM (Deutsche Waggon- und Maschinenfabrik) and GWS (Georg Wiegandt und Söhne), both of Berlin, Germany. Machines were later introduced in Switzerland and then in Austria, in October 1956; these were produced by Glerios / R.Seipel & Co. and Theodor Braun (Vienna).

In 1973, Pez built a factory in Orange, Connecticut, US. In 1983, Scott McWhinnie became the president of the Pez company. He retired in 2003. Joe Vittoria became president of the company in 2004. Around 2005 the size of the original factory was doubled and the Pez dispenser line was expanded. In the mid-1990s the peppermint flavor was reintroduced with remakes of the "regulars".

In early 2002 the family of the original founder of the company bought back 32.5% of the stock from investment company PGH for €18M. They now own 67.5% of the company. The headquarters are in Traun, Austria. The Pez mints are produced in Jánossomorja, Hungary and Orange, Connecticut, while the dispensers are produced in Hungary and China. In 2011, a PEZ Visitor Center was opened in Orange, with over 4,000 square feet dedicated to all things PEZ.

Pez, Inc. has applied for and received patents related to the Pez dispensers, and usually molds the patent number onto the stem of the design.

== Characters ==
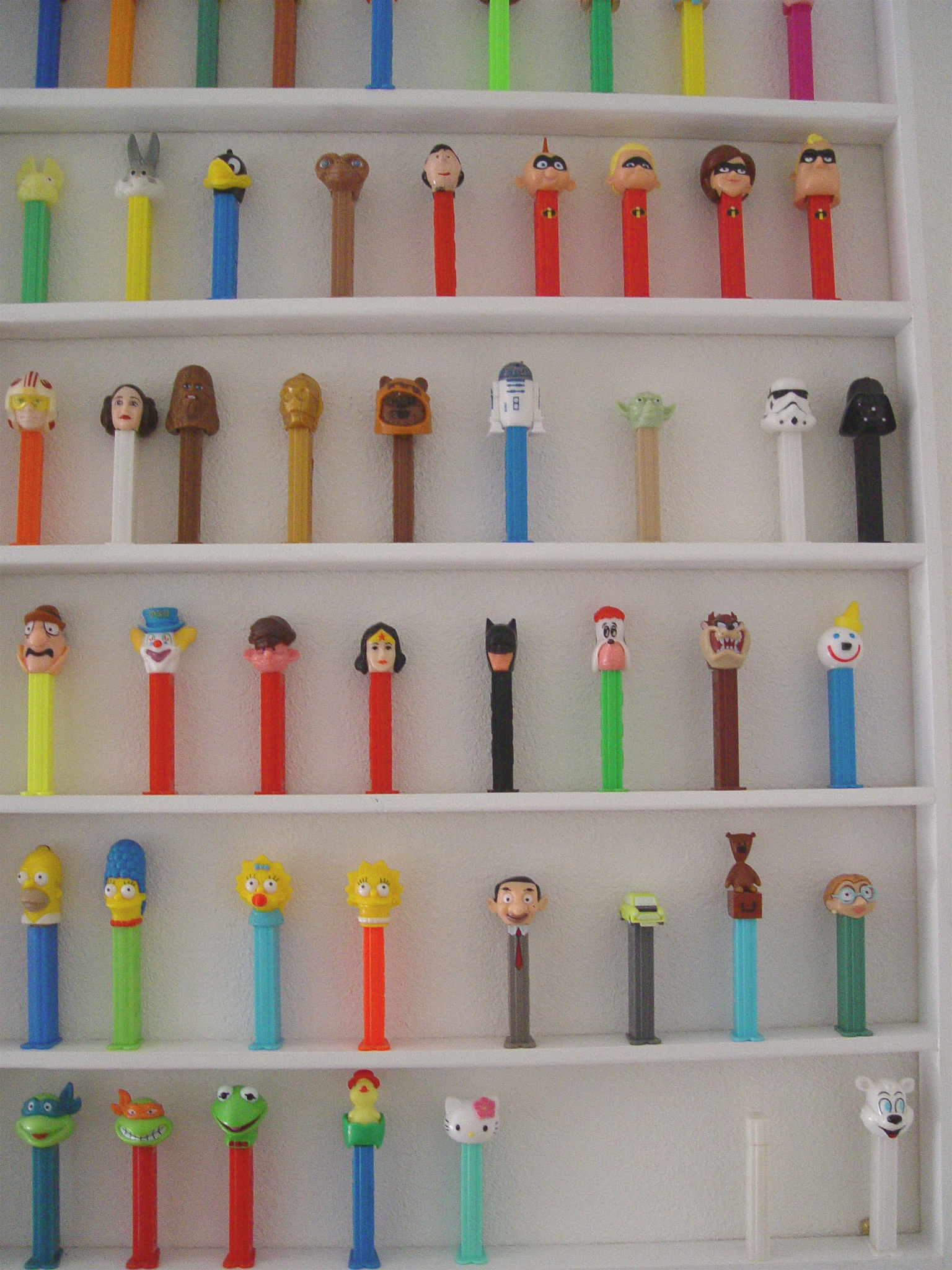
Character-headed Pez dispensers.

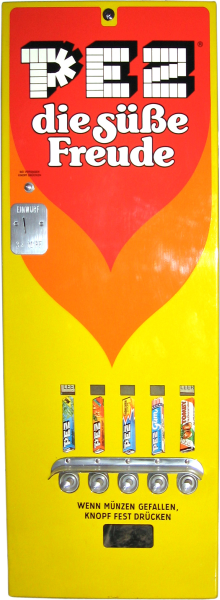
When the price for Pez in a vending machine was increased to 3 coins, extra space for the bigger cash-box had to be fitted below the chute. It shows Pez die süße Freude ("Pez the sweet joy") and Wenn Münzen gefallen, Knopf fest drücken ("When coins have dropped, press button firmly").

Early Pez dispensers did not have character heads on them. They were what is known now as "regulars". A regular dispenser is just a rectangular box with a contoured flip top for dispensing the candy. Toy character head dispensers were introduced in 1955, after the candy was introduced in the United States. There are over 550 unique dispenser heads with thousands of variations.

In the 1970s, three historical figures were created: Betsy Ross, Daniel Boone, and Paul Revere, which were released as part of the Bicentennial series. These dispenser heads were not made to actually look like the people they represented, but instead used generic faces with different accessories.

Star Wars Pez dispensers have been amongst the most popular collectibles since they were introduced in the 1990s.

The company initially had a general rule against creating likenesses of real people, but in 2006 a limited-edition series of three Pez dispensers were made with likenesses of members of the Teutul family from Orange County Choppers.

The NASCAR-themed dispensers are based on the helmets of famous drivers, rather than their actual resemblance.

In 2007, a limited edition Elvis set was released featuring three dispensers from different periods in Presley's life.

In 2008, the first Star Trek dispensers were released in a gift set with the seven original series crew and the Starship Enterprise. A second Star Trek gift set, based on The Next Generation series, was released in autumn 2012.

In 2009, in honour of the 70th anniversary of The Wizard of Oz, Pez released a boxed set with dispensers in the likenesses of the Cowardly Lion, the Tin Man, the Scarecrow, Dorothy Gale, Toto, Glinda, the Wizard of Oz and the Wicked Witch of the West. Only 300,000 sets were made.

In 2010, Pez released a Snow White and the Seven Dwarfs set, featuring a story book. These are the first characters featured on the "Short Stem" body. Only 250,000 sets were made.

In 2011, a two-piece limited edition set was released for charity featuring Prince William and his wife-to-be, Catherine Middleton.

In 2011, an eight-piece limited edition set was released featuring characters from The Lord of the Rings as they appear in Peter Jackson's The Lord of the Rings films: Bilbo, Frodo, Sam, Gandalf, Aragorn, Legolas, Gimli and Gollum. Only 250,000 sets were made. 150,000 Walmart-exclusive sets were made. The Walmart sets did not have Bilbo. Instead, they came with the Eye of Sauron.

In October 2012, Pez released a limited edition Kiss gift set. The Starchild, The Demon, The Catman and The Spaceman are displayed in a reusable metal gift tin.

In 2013, Pez released the Monsters University pez. The characters were Mike Wazowski, James P. "Sulley" Sullivan, Scott "Squishy" Squibbles and Randall Boggs.

In September 2013, Pez released the Hobbit gift set. Bilbo Baggins, Gandalf the Grey, Thorin Oakenshield, Fimbul the Hunter, Radagast, Kili, Bofur and Dwalin are displayed in a printed cardboard box.

In 2013, Pez released a series of 18 wheeler trucks. There were companies like Walgreens, Nice, Wawa, Safeway, Randall's, up market, Havoline and many more.

In 2014, Pez released a giant Raphael from Teenage Mutant Ninja Turtles.

In 2014, Pez released an Angry Birds gift tin. It had Red, Bomb, Stella, and a Minion Pig in a reusable metal gift tin.

=== List of Pez sets of popular characters ===
Name	Characters
Mickey Mouse	Mickey Mouse, Minnie Mouse, Donald Duck, Daisy Duck, Goofy, Pluto
Disney	Dory, Nemo (Finding Dory); Jake (Jake and the Never Land Pirates); Sebastian, Flounder (The Little Mermaid); Simba, Mufasa, Timon and Pumbaa (The Lion King); Olaf (Frozen 2); Phineas Flynn, Ferb Fletcher, Candace Flynn, Agent P, Dr. Heinz Doofenshmirtz (Phineas and Ferb)
Disney Princess	Snow White, Cinderella, Aurora, Ariel, Belle, Jasmine, Tiana, Rapunzel, Merida, Elsa, Anna, Moana
Pixar	Woody, Buzz Lightyear, Jessie, Rex, Slinky the Dog, Hamm, Nemo, Dory, Bruce, Mike Wazowski, Sulley, Randall Boggs, Scott "Squishy" Squibbles, Remy, Lightning McQueen, Mater, Doc Hudson, Linguini, Chef Skinner, The Incredibles, Elastigirl, Jack-Jack, Dash, Violet, Sally Carrera, Bo Peep, WALL-E, EVE, Emile, Bailey, Hank, Finn McMissile, Alien, Captain Lightyear, Sox
The Muppets and Sesame Street	Kermit the Frog, Miss Piggy, Gonzo, Fozzie Bear, Animal, Elmo, Ernie, Bert, Zoe, Cookie Monster, Big Bird
Marvel	Spider-Man, Captain America, Iron Man, Thor, Hulk, Wolverine, Black Panther, Captain Marvel, Thanos, Dr. Strange, Groot, Miles Morales, Rocket Raccoon, Venom
Star Wars	Luke Skywalker, Princess Leia, Han Solo, Boba Fett, Jango Fett, C-3PO, R2-D2, Chewbacca, Lando, Stormtrooper, Emperor Palpatine, General Grievous, Yoda, Darth Vader, Death Star, Clone Trooper, Darth Maul, Porg, Ewok, Rey, Kylo Ren, BB-8, Death Trooper, Ashoka Tano, Anakin Skywalker, Obi-Wan Kenobi, Grogu, Fennec Shand, The Mandalorian,
The Wizard Of Oz	Dorothy Gale, Toto, Wizard of Oz, Scarecrow, Cowardly Lion, Tin Man, Glinda, Wicked Witch of the West
Scooby-Doo	Fred, Daphne, Velma, Shaggy, Scooby-Doo
Tom and Jerry	Tom, Jerry
Looney Tunes	Bugs Bunny, Cool Cat, Daffy Duck, Foghorn Leghorn, Henery Hawk, Merlin Mouse, Petunia Pig, Speedy Gonzales, Sylvester, Tazmanian Devil, Tweety Bird, Wile E. Coyote, Road Runner, Yosemite Sam
DC Comics	Superman, Wonder Woman, Batman, Aquaman, the Flash, Green Lantern, Catwoman, Two-Face, The Riddler, The Joker, The Penguin
The Lord of the Rings and The Hobbit	Bilbo Baggins, Frodo Baggins, Sam, Gandalf The Grey, Aragorn, Legolas, Thorin Oakenshield, Fimbul the Hunter, Radagast, Gimli, Gollum, Sauron
Teenage Mutant Ninja Turtles	Leonardo, Donatello, Raphael, Michelangelo
The Simpsons	Homer Simpson, Marge Simpson, Bart Simpson, Lisa Simpson, Maggie Simpson
Angry Birds	Red, Chuck, Bomb, Stella, Minion Pig, Red (Movie), Bomb (Movie), Chuck (Movie), Silver (Movie)
Sanrio	Hello Kitty, My Melody, Cinnamoroll
Mario	Mario, Luigi, Princess Peach, Yoshi, Koopa, Wario, Toad, Donkey Kong, Diddy Kong
Pokémon	Bulbasaur, Charmander, Squirtle, Pikachu, Torchic, Treecko, Mudkip, Jirachi, Meowth, Plusle, Minun, Deoxys, Munchlax, Weavile, Lucario, Piplup, Mew, Pachirisu, Psyduck, Koffing
Nickelodeon	Liberty, Skye, Chase, Marshall (Paw Patrol); Suzy Sheep, George Pig, Peppa Pig (Peppa Pig)
SpongeBob SquarePants	SpongeBob SquarePants, Patrick Star, Squidward Tentacles, Gary the Snail, alternate attire SpongeBob
DreamWorks	Shrek, Donkey, Fiona, Puss in Boots, Alex, Marty, Melman, Gloria, Skipper, Private, Rico, Kowalski, RJ, Verne, Hammy, Stella, Barry B. Benson, Adam Flayman, Pollen Jock, Vanessa Bloome, Po the Panda, Master Shifu, Tigress, Monkey, B.O.B., The Missing Link, Insectosaurus, Toothless, Hiccup, Branch, Princess Poppy, Guy Diamond, Queen Barb, Viva
The Smurfs	Papa Smurf, Smurfette, Brainy Smurf, Clumsy Smurf
Jurassic World	Blue the Raptor, T-Rex, Triceratops, Mosasaurus
Despicable Me	Gru, Mega Minion Tim, Mega Minion Mel, Tim, Mel, Stuart

== Fandom ==
=== Value of Pez dispensers ===
Some Pez dispensers can sell for large amounts as collectibles. The highest verifiable sale of a Pez dispenser was a private sale of a Mickey Mouse softhead at $7,000 between an Austrian dealer and a US collector. This dispenser was never available for sale to the public, and was a factory prototype. The most valuable Pez dispensers are three Political Donkeys, each valued at over $13,000, one of which was owned by John F. Kennedy.

=== Pez conventions and gatherings ===
The Pez collecting hobby has grown to the point where several conventions are held annually around the world. The oldest convention is Pez-a-Mania, which has been held in Cleveland, Ohio, since 1991.

== Media ==
In 2015 Envision Media Arts started developing an animated film version of Pez with Cameron Fay writing a screenplay, Lee Nelson and David Buelow producing, and Gregg Rossen, Catherine Judit Kaehne, Brian Sawyer and Jonathan Hung executive producing the film.

The Pez Card Game is an out-of-print multiplayer collectible card game based on Pez candy. The object of the game is to earn 25 points through playing cards with Pez flavours and dispensers. The core set contained 204 cards.

In 2022 a documentary called The Pez Outlaw told the story of a rural farmer who made money smuggling foreign Pez dispensers into the United States. The film streamed on Netflix in 2023.

A yellow duck Pez dispenser is very prominent throughout the events of the Apple TV original series Silo.

== See also ==
- Burlingame Museum of Pez Memorabilia

== Bibliography ==
- Welch, David (September 1994). Collecting Pez (illustrated ed.). Bubba Scrubba. ISBN 978-0-96449-560-9.
