= List of Austrian scientists =

This is a list of Austrian scientists and scientists from the Austria of Austria-Hungary.

== Physicists, mathematicians and chemists ==
- Emil Artin, mathematician (Artin's conjecture)
- Norbert Bischofberger, chemist
- Wilhelm Blaschke, mathematician
- Ludwig Boltzmann (1844-1906), physicist, born in Vienna
- Fritjof Capra, physicist
- Christian Andreas Doppler, physicist, 1803-1853, born in Salzburg (See Doppler effect)
- Paul Ehrenfest, physicist and mathematician
- Heinz Falk, chemist
- Kurt Gödel, mathematician (born in Austria-Hungary, became a naturalized US citizen)
- Thomas Gold, astrophysicist, geophysicist, controversial for 'steady state' view of cosmos and abiogenic petroleum origin theory
- Wolfgang Gröbner, mathematician (best known for Gröbner basis)
- Hans Hahn, mathematician (member of the Vienna Circle)
- Wilhelm Karl, Ritter von Haidinger, physicist, geologist and mineralogist of the 19th century
- Friedrich Hasenöhrl, physicist
- Victor Franz Hess, physicist, Nobel Prize in Physics
- Nikolaus Joseph von Jacquin, chemist
- Walter Kohn, Nobel Prize in Chemistry in 1998
- Karl Kordesch, chemist and inventor
- Anton Schrötter von Kristelli, chemist and mineralogist (red phosphor)
- Richard Kuhn, chemist, Nobel Prize in Chemistry in 1938
- Johann Josef Loschmidt, physicist and chemist
- Ernst Mach, physicist and philosopher (Mach number)
- Lise Meitner, physicist
- Karl Menger, mathematician (Menger's theorem, Menger sponge); son of Carl Menger)
- Ronald Micura, chemist
- Richard von Mises, physicist (younger brother of Ludwig von Mises)
- Otto E. Neugebauer, mathematician and astronomer
- Wolfgang Pauli, physicist, Nobel Prize in Physics 1945
- Max Ferdinand Perutz, chemist, Nobel Prize in Chemistry 1962
- Josef Maximilian Petzval, physicist and mathematician
- Fritz Pregl, chemist, Nobel Prize in Chemistry 1923
- Johann Radon, mathematician
- Otto Redlich, physical chemist
- Leopold Ružička (born in Croatia, Austria-Hungary in 1887, died in Mammern, Switzerland in 1976), chemist, Nobel Prize in Chemistry in 1944
- Karl Schlögl, chemist
- Erwin Schrödinger, physicist, Nobel Prize in Physics
- Heinrich Franz Friedrich Tietze, mathematician
- Leopold Vietoris (1891-2002), mathematician
- Victor Frederick Weisskopf, physicist (worked on the Manhattan Project)
- Carl Auer von Welsbach, chemist
- Anton Zeilinger, physicist, Nobel Prize in Physics 2022
- Gernot Zippe, physicist (developed Zippe-type centrifuge to extract Uranium-235 for nuclear weapons)
- Mario Zippermayr, physicist, inventor of the thermobaric weapon
- Richard Adolf Zsigmondy, chemist, Nobel Prize in Chemistry in 1925

== Biologists ==
- Othenio Abel, paleontologist and paleobiologist
- Ludwig von Bertalanffy, theoretical biologist, philosopher of science, and pioneer of systems theory
- Erwin Chargaff, biochemist
- Carl Cori, born in Prague, Austria-Hungary, biochemist, pharmacologist, Nobel Prize in Physiology or Medicine in 1947
- Ernst von Fleischl-Marxow, physiologist and physician
- Karl von Frisch, ethologist Nobel Prize in Physiology or Medicine
- Hans Hass, marine biologist
- Wolf-Dieter Heiss, neuroscientist
- Josef Hyrtl, anatomist
- Nicolaus Joseph Jacquin, botanist, chemist, and physician
- Paul Kammerer, zoologist
- Karl Landsteiner (1886-1943), immunologist and serologist, Nobel Prize in Physiology or Medicine
- Otto Loewi, pharmacologist, Nobel Prize in Physiology or Medicine (born in Germany, but spent 40 years in Austria, from age 25-65)
- Konrad Lorenz, zoologist, Nobel Prize in Physiology or Medicine
- Gregor Mendel, founder of genetics
- Gerd B. Müller, evolutionary biologist
- Clemens von Pirquet, bacteriologist and immunologist
- Karl Pribram, neuroscientist, originator of Holonomic brain theory
- Hans Leo Przibram, zoologist and theoretical biologist
- August Emanuel von Reuss, paleontologist
- Carl Rabl, anatomist
- Rupert Riedl, zoologist and theoretical biologist
- Joseph Rock, explorer, geographer, botanist and linguist
- Peter Schuster, theoretical biochemist, origins of life researcher
- Hans Selye, endocrinologist
- Hans Tuppy, biochemist
- Günter P. Wagner, evolutionary biologist
- Paul Alfred Weiss, embryologist, neurobiologist, and theoretical biologist
- Rudolf Wlassak, physiologist and neurologist 1865-1930

== Physicians ==
- Alfred Adler, psychiatrist, father of Individual Psychology
- Hans Asperger, pediatrician (most known for work on autism, Asperger syndrome named for him)
- Leopold Auenbrugger (1722-1809), physician (method of percussion)
- Robert Bárány, physician, 1914 Nobel Prize in Physiology or Medicine
- Georg Joseph Beer, physician (forerunner in ophthalmology)
- Lorenz Böhler, physician
- Josef Breuer, psychiatrist (forerunner in psychoanalysis)
- Ernst, Baron von Feuchtersleben, physician and poet
- Viktor Frankl, psychiatrist, father of logotherapy
- Sigmund Freud, psychiatrist, father of psychoanalysis
- Otto Gross, physician and revolutionist
- Eric Kandel, neuropsychiatrist (born Vienna, emigrated to the US), 2000 Nobel Prize in Physiology or Medicine
- Leo Kanner, child psychiatrist
- Fritz Köberle, pathologist, physician (emigrated to Brazil)
- Franz Mesmer (1734-1815), physician, developed an early form of hypnotism
- Ernst Moro, physician and pediatrician
- Paracelsus (real name: Theophrast von Hohenheim), alchemist and physician
- Wilhelm Reich (1897-1957), psychiatrist
- Erwin Ringel (1921-1994), psychiatrist (presuicidal syndrome)
- Ignaz Semmelweis, physician (born in Hungary, Austria-Hungary)
- Hans Steiner, child and adolescent psychiatrist
- Julius Wagner-Jauregg, physician, 1927 Nobel Prize in Physiology or Medicine

== Psychologists ==
- Bruno Bettelheim (1903–1990), psychologist
- Anna Freud (1895–1982), child psychologist
- Sigmund Freud (1856–1939), founding father of psychoanalysis
- Fritz Heider (1896–1988), psychologist
- Melanie Klein (1882-1960), child psychotherapist (emigrated to England in 1926)
- Walter Mischel (1930-2018), psychologist
- Otto Rank (1884–1939), pioneer psychologist
- Paul Watzlawick (1921-2007), family therapist and psychologist

== Economists ==
- Siegfried Becher, economist and government minister
- Eugen von Böhm-Bawerk
- Ernst Fehr
- Simon Gächter
- Friedrich Hayek, economist and social scientist, Bank of Sweden Prize in Economic Sciences in Memory of Alfred Nobel 1974
- Rudolf Hilferding (1877-1941), Marxist and politician (murdered by the Gestapo in Paris)
- Leopold Kohr, economist
- Carl Menger, founder of the Austrian School of economics
- Ludwig von Mises, free-market economist
- Oskar Morgenstern, co-founder of game theory
- Martin Nowak
- Joseph Schumpeter, economist (neoclassical), born in Triech, Austria-Hungary
- Othmar Spann, economist and philosopher
- Friedrich von Wieser, economist (regarded as follower of the Austrian School of economics)

== Engineers, inventors ==
- Carlo Abarth, motorcycle racer and car designer
- Igo Etrich (1879-1967), aviation pioneer and pilot
- Anselm Franz, pioneer in jet engine engineering
- Gaston Glock, inventor, founder of GLOCK GmbH
- Claire Gmachl, quantum cascade laser and mid-IR technologies pioneer
- Eduard Haas, inventor of Pez candy
- Ingeborg Hochmair, electrical engineer who developed the modern cochlear implant
- Viktor Kaplan, inventor of turbines for river power plants
- Wilhelm Kress, aviation pioneer, inventor of the stick control for airplanes
- Hedy Lamarr, known for research in frequencies, needed for mobile phones
- Siegfried Marcus, automobile pioneer (vehicles of 1870 and 1889), lived most of his life in Austria
- Alois Negrelli, engineer and railroad pioneer (created the plans for the Suez Canal)
- Ferdinand Porsche, automotive engineer, designed the Volkswagen (the "people's car"), born in Austria-Hungary
- Johann Puch, engineer and entrepreneur
- Josef Ressel, inventor of the marine screw propeller
- Edmund Rumpler, engineer, aviation pioneer
- Alois Senefelder, inventor of the printing technique of Lithography
- Nikola Tesla, inventor, mechanical engineer, and electrical engineer (prior to moving to Paris in 1882)
- Max Valier, rocketry pioneer
- Auer von Welsbach, inventor of gaslight

== Philosophers ==
- Nathan Birnbaum, philosopher (created the word "Zionism")
- Franz Brentano, philosopher and psychologist
- Martin Buber (1878-1965), philosopher, born in Vienna
- Christian von Ehrenfels, philosopher
- Herbert Feigl, philosopher (member of the Vienna Circle)
- Paul Feyerabend (died 1994), philosopher
- Philipp Frank, philosopher and physicist (member of the Vienna Circle)
- Heinrich Gomperz (1873-1942), philosopher, born in Vienna
- Edmund Husserl, philosopher (born in Prossnitz, Austria-Hungary)
- Victor Kraft, philosopher
- Nachman Krochmal, philosopher, historian and theologian
- Alexius Meinong (1853-1920), philosopher (theory of objects)
- Otto Neurath, socialist, economist and philosopher
- Karl Popper, philosopher (born in Austria, became British)
- Moritz Schlick, philosopher (member of the Vienna Circle)
- Othmar Spann, philosopher and economist
- Rudolf Steiner, mystic and philosopher
- Friedrich Waismann, mathematician, philosopher and physicist (member of the Vienna Circle)
- Otto Weininger, philosopher
- Ludwig Wittgenstein, philosopher, born 1889 in Vienna, died 1951 in Cambridge

== Other scientists ==
- Max Adler (1873-1937), jurist and Marxist author
- Christopher Alexander, architectural theorist
- Wilhelm Alzinger, archeologist
- Oscar Baumann, philosopher, explorer, ethnologist and geographer
- Heinz von Foerster, cyberneticist, systems theorist
- Joseph von Hammer-Purgstall, orientalist
- Julius Hann, meteorologist
- Thomas Henzinger, computer scientist, founding president of the IST Austria
- Hans Kelsen, jurist; father of the Austrian constitution
- Paul Felix Lazarsfeld, social scientist
- Doris Vickers, archaeoastronomer
- Maria Wähnl, astronomer

== See also ==
- List of Austrians
- Nobel Prize
