= Kress Drachenflieger =

Drachenflieger
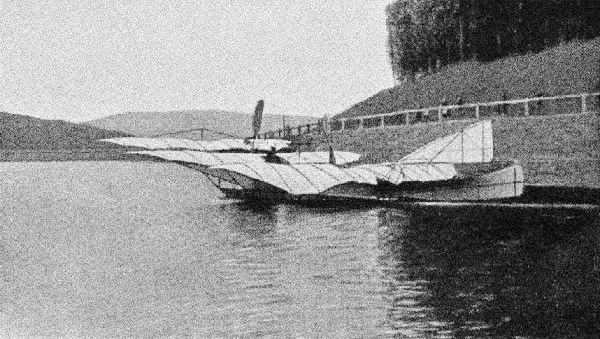

General information
- Type: Experimental aircraft
- National origin: Austria-Hungary
- Manufacturer: Wilhelm Kress
- Designer: Wilhelm Kress
- Number built: 1

The Kress Drachenflieger (German: "Dragon-flier") was an experimental aircraft constructed in Austria-Hungary in 1901. While taxiing trials proved successful, the aircraft lacked sufficient power to fly, and was wrecked in the course of testing on 3 October.

It was built by Wilhelm Kress with the assistance of a 5,000-krone grant from Emperor Franz Josef in an attempt to create the first heavier-than-air flying machine. The aircraft was constructed as a large, open-truss structure of steel tubing with three sets of wire-braced monoplane wings placed in tandem along its length. The sets of wings were placed at uneven heights with respect to the major axis of the aircraft to prevent aerodynamic interference between them. The undercarriage consisted of two aluminium pontoons with hardened keels, intended to allow the Drachenflieger to take off from and land on water or ice. Three rudders were linked to a common control stick and were to provide steering on water and in the air. Power was provided by a Daimler petrol engine driving two large screw-type two-bladed propellers, the first attempt to use an internal combustion engine to power a heavier-than-air aircraft. The fabric-covered propellers were mounted pusher-fashion on pylons above and on either side of the main truss, between the second and third sets of wings, and were designed to counter-rotate.

The engine would prove to be the aircraft's downfall. Kress had originally intended to have an engine specially built, calculating that he needed 37 kW from an engine weighing not more than 220 kg (475 lb). When the cost of this proved prohibitive, he purchased an automobile engine already in production which had an output of just 22 kW (30 hp) but weighing nearly twice as much as Kress' calculations allowed for. Initial trials on water as early as March 1901 confirmed that the poorer power-to-weight ratio would be a problem. Nevertheless, other elements of the design proved sound, and the Drachenflieger was successfully controlled while taxiing, even against a headwind.

Unable to afford to replace the engine, Kress continued taxiing trials. The last of these was on 3 October on the Wienerwaldsee reservoir at Tullnerbach, in which he was forced to swerve suddenly to avoid a groyne. As a result of the violent maneuver, the supports for one of the pontoons failed, causing the Drachenflieger to capsize and sink.

== Specifications ==
General characteristics

- Crew: One pilot
- Gross weight: 850 kg (1,870 lb)
- Powerplant: 1 × Daimler automotive engine , 22 kW (30 hp)
