= Siegfried Marcus =

German engineer and inventor (1831–1898)

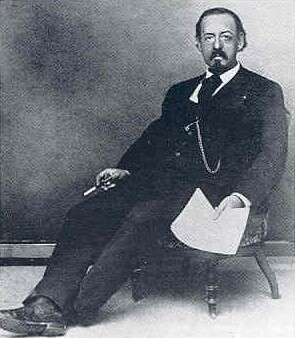
- Marcus
- Born: 18 September 1831; Malchin, Grand Duchy of Mecklenburg-Schwerin
- Died: 1 July 1898 (aged 66); Vienna, Austria-Hungary

Siegfried Samuel Marcus (German: [ˈziːkfʁiːt ˈmaʁkʊs]; 18 September 1831 – 1 July 1898) was a German engineer and inventor, born in the Grand Duchy of Mecklenburg-Schwerin. He made the first petrol-powered vehicle, a handcart, in 1870, while living in Vienna, Austria. Marcus created a second vehicle in 1888/1889, but it is not known if he used it, and he did not develop it further. Marcus' vehicles had no influence on the development of cars, and his experimental vehicles were regarded by some journalists as "impractical". However, Marcus is credited with developing the ignition magneto used in spark-ignition engines.

== Life ==
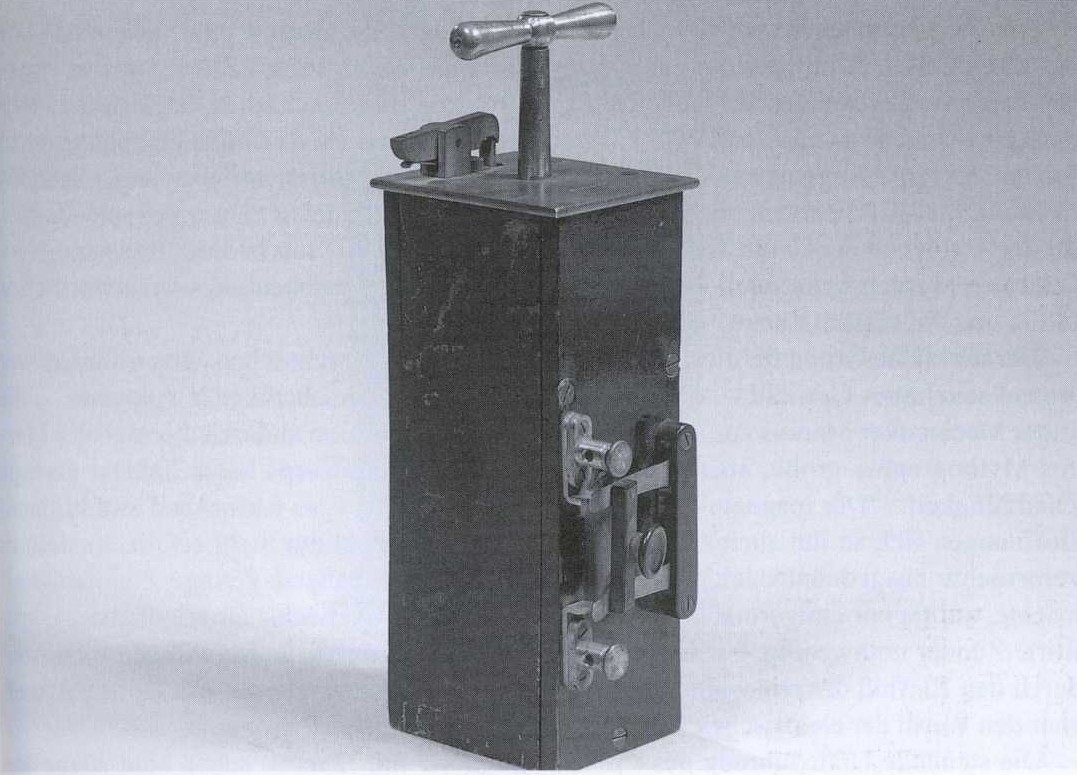
Blasting machine, "Wiener Zünder" (Viennese Igniter), 1864

Marcus was born in Malchin, in the Grand Duchy of Mecklenburg-Schwerin in the German Confederation, into a Jewish family. He began work at age 12 as an apprentice mechanic. At 17, he joined Siemens & Halske, an engineering company that built telegraph lines. He moved to Vienna, the capital of the Austrian Empire, in 1852, working first as a technician in the Physical Institute of the Medical School. He then worked as an assistant to Professor Carl Ludwig, a physiologist. In 1860, Marcus opened his own workshop which made mechanical and electrical equipment. The first was located at Mariahilferstrasse 107 and the second at Mondscheingasse 4.

His chief improvements include a telegraph relay system and ignition devices such as the "Wiener Zünder", a blasting machine. Marcus was buried at the Protestant Cemetery at Hütteldorf, Vienna. Later, his remains were transferred to an "Honorary Tomb" of Vienna's Central Cemetery. During his lifetime he was awarded the Golden Cross of Merit by the Austro-Hungarian Emperor Franz Joseph for his scientific achievements.

== Marcus' cars ==
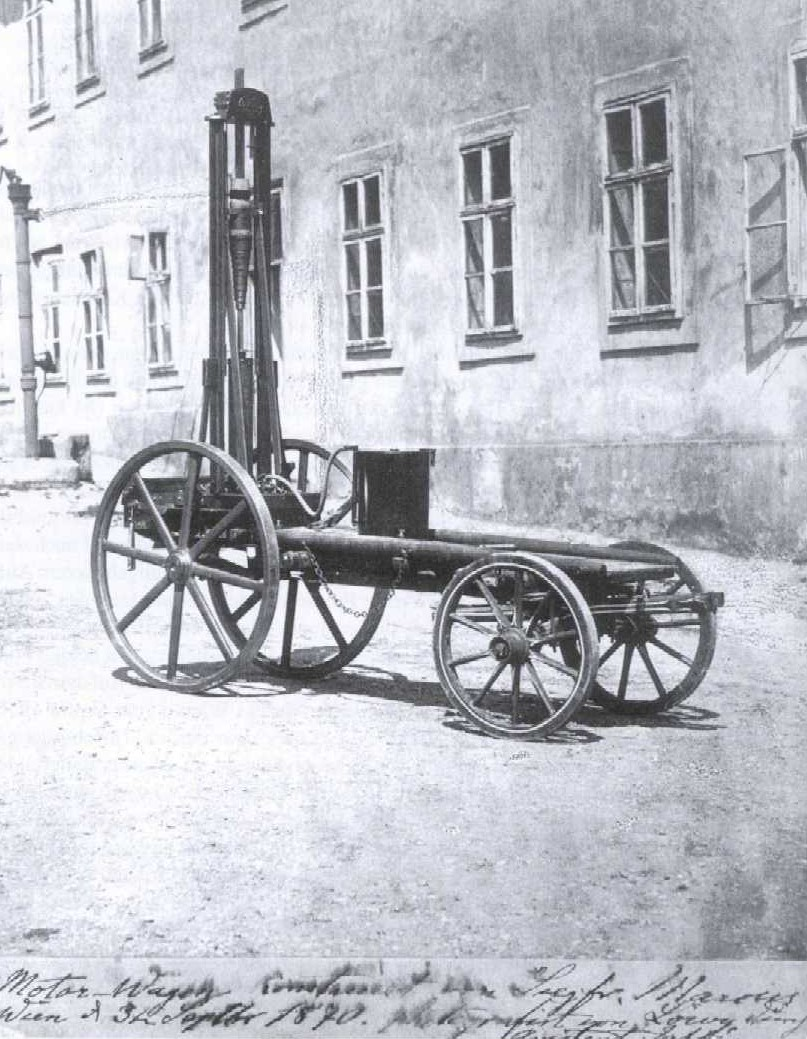
Marcus cart of 1870

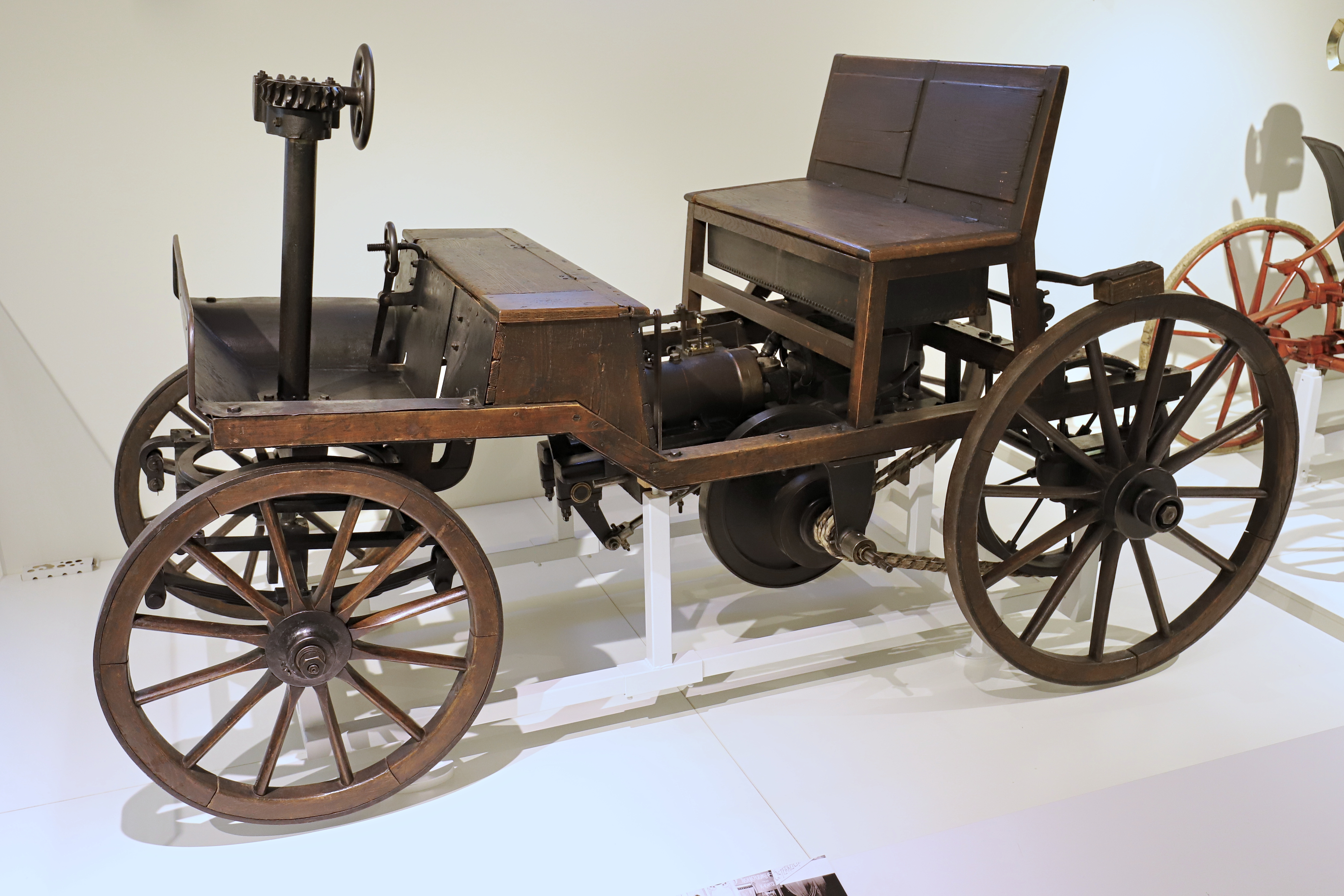
The second Marcus car of 1888/89 in Vienna’s Technical Museum

Based on the information from existing sources, Marcus' first machine was built on a simple handcart in 1870. It had to be started by lifting the drive wheels off the ground and spinning them. The internal combustion engine was designed for liquid combustibles and made him the first to propel a vehicle, a handcart, by means of petrol. Marcus was not satisfied with this cart and dismantled it. However, his first vehicle model was displayed at the Vienna Exhibition in 1873.

In 1883, a patent for a low-voltage ignition magneto was given to Marcus in Germany, and a new petrol engine was built. This design was used for all further engines, including that of the only existing Marcus car of 1888/1889. It was this ignition, in conjunction with the "rotating brush carburetor", that made the engine's design very innovative. By 1886, the German Navy was using the engine in its torpedo boats.

In 1887, Marcus started a co-operation with the Moravian company Märky, Bromovsky & Schulz. They offered two stroke and — after the fall of the Otto-Patent in 1886 — four stroke engines of the Marcus type.

In the 1904 book, The Motor, it was stated that Siegfried Marcus is widely credited with having invented the benzine motor.

John Nixon of The London Times in 1938 considered Marcus' development of the motor car to have been experimental, as opposed to Benz who took the concept from experimental to production. Nixon described Marcus' cars as "impractical". In 1950, The Times described his second car erroneously as being built in 1875, and the first petrol-powered road vehicle. A description of its first journey of 7.5 miles from Vienna to Klosterneuberg was included in the article. In 1968 and 1971, it was disproved that Marcus had constructed his car in 1875; it was built in 1888/89. Since the car was moved to the Vienna Technical Museum in 1918, it has only been driven twice, once when sent for display in Sweden.

== Nazi rewrite ==
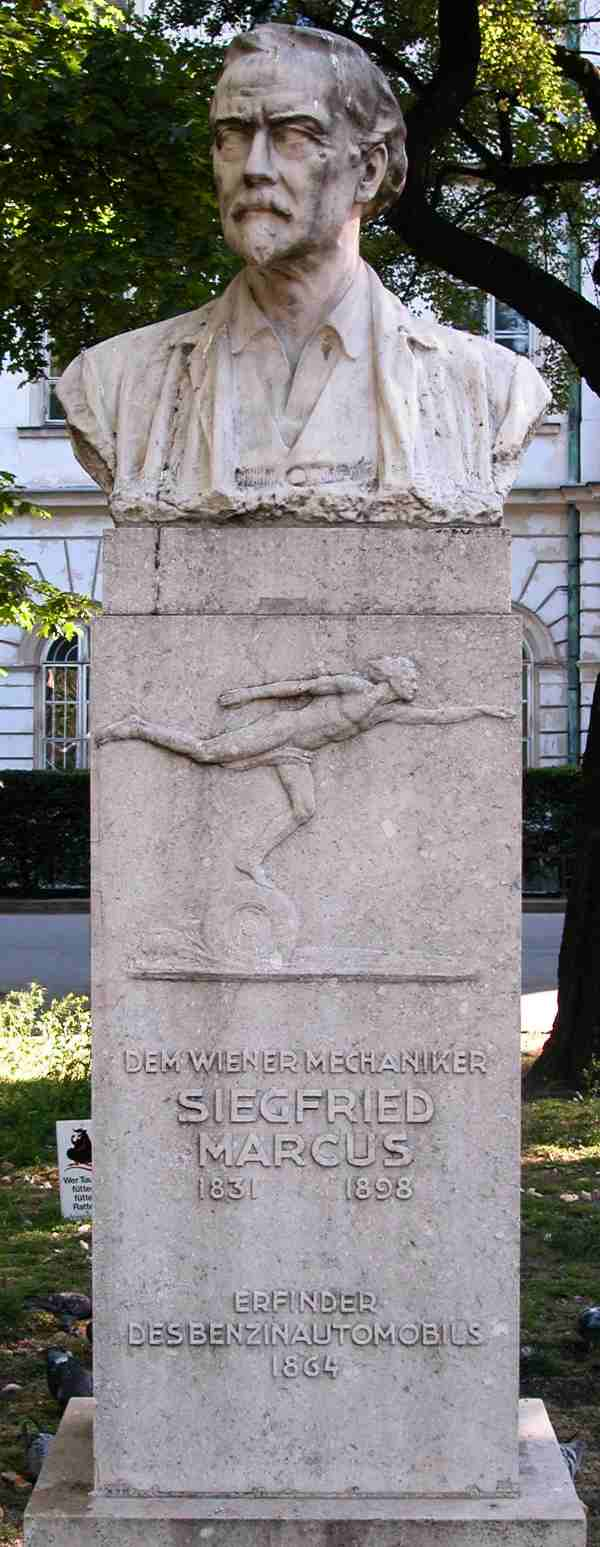
Monument at Vienna Technical Museum

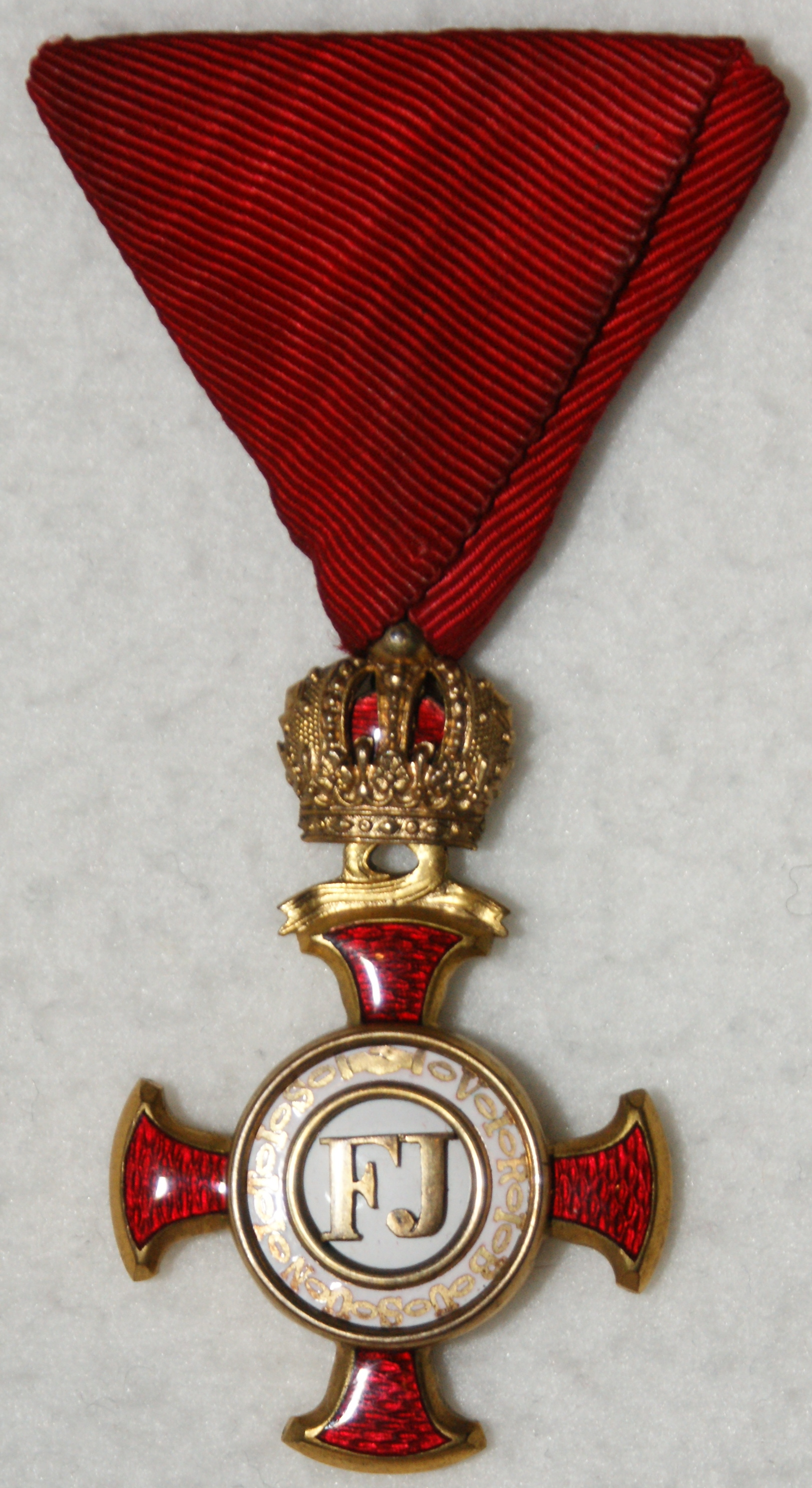
Golden Cross of Merit

Because of Marcus' Jewish ancestry, his name and all memorabilia, particularly in Austria, vanished under the Nazis. In 1937, the Austrian Harand Movement Against Racial Hatred had issued a series of stamps featuring prominent Jews, including Marcus, who had contributed to mankind in response to The Eternal Jew art exhibition by Julius Streicher in Munich. Marcus was credited by the movement as having invented the petrol driven motor car. With the German occupation of Austria in March 1938, the memorial in front of the Vienna Technical University was removed. After World War II, the monument was rebuilt and his car, which had been hidden, was returned to display.

Marcus was removed from German encyclopedias as the inventor of the modern car, under a directive from the German Ministry for Propaganda during World War II. His name was replaced with the names of Daimler and Benz. The directive (in German) read as follows:

Reichsministerium für Volksaufklärung und Propaganda

Geschäftszeichen. S 8100/4.7.4.0/7 1

Berlin W8, den 4. Juli 1940
Wilhelmplatz 8-9

An die Direktion der Daimler-Benz-A.G. Stuttgart-Untertürkheim

Betrifft: Eigentlichen Erfinder des Automobils
Auf Ihr Schreiben vom 30. Mai 1940 Dr.Wo/Fa.

Das Bibliographische Institut und der Verlag F.A. Brockhaus sind darauf hingewiesen worden, dass in Meyers Konversations Lexikon und im Großen Brockhaus künftig nicht Siegfried Marcus, sondern die beiden deutschen Ingenieure Gottlieb Daimler und Carl Benz als Schöpfer des modernen Kraftwagens zu bezeichnen sind.

In English this would be

Reich Ministry of Public Enlightenment and Propaganda

Reference number S 8100 / 4.7.4.0 / 7 1

Berlin W8, 4 July 1940
Wilhelmsplatz 8-9

To the Directorate of Daimler-Benz A.G. Stuttgart-Untertürkheim

Subject: True inventor of the automobile
Referring to your letter of 30 May 1940 Dr.Wo / Fa.

The Bibliographical Institute and the publisher F. A. Brockhaus have been notified that in the future, [the encyclopedias] Meyers Konversations Lexikon and the Große Brockhaus are to refer to the two German engineers Gottlieb Daimler and Carl Benz as the creators of the modern automobile, not to Siegfried Marcus.

Current thinking is that Marcus' car only ran in 1888/1889, years after the Benz Patent-Motorwagen. Some early publications suggested that Marcus may have had a petrol powered vehicle running earlier than 1870 (in 1864 or 1866), but this lacks evidence. Encyclopædia Britannica still cites 1864 for Marcus' first car with a 10-year gap to the second. However, some sources call this the "Marcus myth", stating that early chroniclers confused an automobile he had built in 1888/89 (also called the "Second Marcus Car") with the construction (handcart) he had built in 1870, giving rise to unsubstantiated years of construction such as 1864 and 1875.

In an article titled, "The End of the Marcus Legend", evidence is presented that the "1875” automobile was actually built much later, in 1888. The originator of the 1875 date, Ludwig Czischek-Christen, was asked by patent lawyers to produce any evidence to support the 1875 date, and during the course of his investigation, he uncovered "decisive" evidence that the Marcus automobile was actually built in 1888, and not in 1875 as he had originally published for the 1900 Austrian exhibits at the Paris Exposition.

== Patents ==
Marcus was the holder of 131 patents in 16 countries. He never applied for a patent for the motorcar and, of course, he never held one. Nevertheless, he was the first to use petrol to propel a vehicle, a simple handcart, in 1870. It is uncertain whether the second Marcus car ran before 1890.

Some examples of his patents:

- 33258, 10 September 1861, Improvements to relay magnets
- 2058, 6 July 1872, Device for mixing of fuel with air
- 286030, 2 October 1883, Improved gas engine
- 306339, 7 October 1884, Electrical igniting device for gas engines

In conjunction with Captain E von Wohlgemuth of the Imperial German Navy, Marcus invented an electrical ignition of ships cannons. The advantages of the system were that it allowed for the simultaneous firing of the cannons, or selection of a particular firing pattern, and the ability to fire them from the ship's bridge.

== Sources ==
- Bürbaumer, Ursula (1998). Das erste Auto der Welt? [The first car in the world?] (in German). Vienna: Erasmus.
- Hardenberg, Horst (2000). Siegfried Marcus, Mythos und Wirklichkeit [Siegfried Marcus, Myth and Reality]. aus der Wissenschaftlichen * Schriftenreihe des DaimlerChrysler Konzernarchivs (in German). Bielefeld: Delius & Klasing. Awarded as the June 2001 book of the month by the Austrian Academy of Science.
- Böttcher, Norbert (2005). Siegfried Marcus (in German). Teetz: Hentrich & Hentrich.
- Bürbaumer, Ursula; Steinböck, Johannes; Hardenberg, Horst; Schaukal, Gerhard; Mergl, Ladislav (2000). Grössing, Helmuth (ed.). Autos-Fahrer – Konstrukteure (in German). Vienna: Erasmus.
- Bürbaumer, Ursula (2003), "Siegfried Marcus in Wien", Dissertation Database (in German), Austrian Research Centers

== See also ==
- History of the internal combustion engine
- List of Austrian scientists
