= Heinz Falk =

Austrian professor of organic chemistry (born 1939)

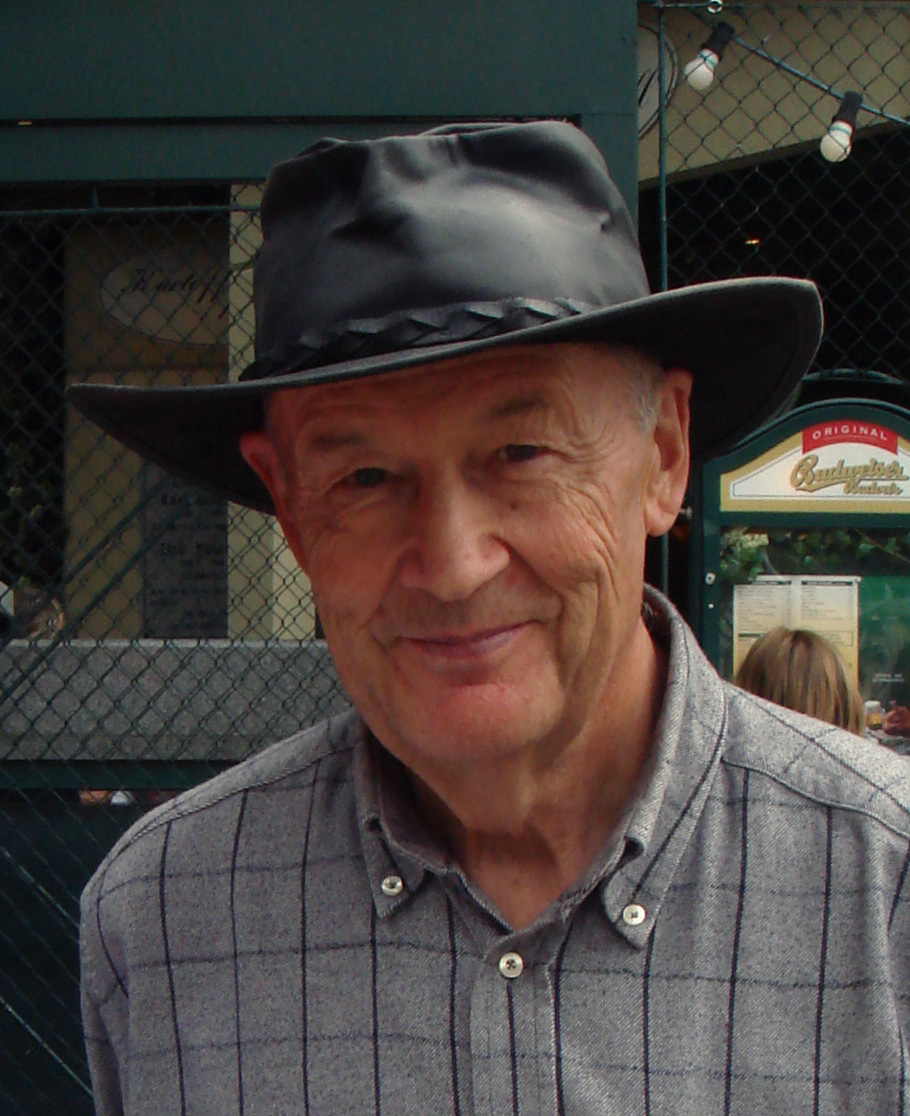
- Heinz Falk
- Born: April 29, 1939 (age 87); Sankt Pölten, Austria
- Occupation: Professor emeritus
- Spouse(s): Rotraud Falk, (m. 1966)
- Children: Alexander Falk

Heinz Falk (born April 29, 1939, in Sankt Pölten, Lower Austria) is professor emeritus for organic chemistry at Johannes Kepler University of Linz and editor of "Progress in the Chemistry of Organic Natural Compounds". His research is focused on structural analysis, synthesis, stereochemistry and photochemistry of plant and animal photosensitizing and photosensory pigments, such as hypericin.

== Biography ==
=== Early life ===
Heinz Falk was born April 29, 1939, in Sankt Pölten, Austria, went to elementary school in Statzendorf and completed middle school in Krems an der Donau. After moving to Vienna in 1953 he completed a three-year program at HBLVA for Chemical Industry, Rosensteingasse and completed his high-school diploma in 1959 through classes at an evening school, where he met his future wife, Rotraud Falk (née Strohbach).

=== Marriage and children ===
Heinz Falk is married to Rotraud Falk since 1966 and they have one son:

- Alexander Falk (August 13, 1967) is the CEO of Altova.

=== Education ===
Heinz Falk studied chemistry at the University of Vienna starting in 1959 and completed his dissertation under his doctoral advisor, Karl Schlögl, in 1966. In 1971 Falk spent a year abroad to study at ETH Zürich. Upon his return to Vienna in 1972 he attained habilitation for organic chemistry at the University of Vienna.

=== Career ===
1966-1979: University of Vienna
Starting in 1966 Falk was an assistant at the Institute of Organic Chemistry at the University of Vienna. In 1975 he was promoted to associate professor of physical organic chemistry at the University of Vienna. In the summer of 1978 Falk was invited to speak at the Gordon Research Conference in Wolfeboro.
1979–present: Johannes Kepler University of Linz
In 1979 Falk received a call to become full professor of organic chemistry at Johannes Kepler University of Linz, where he founded the new Institute of Organic Chemistry. From 1989 through 1991 he was elected Dean of the Faculty of Engineering and Natural Sciences (TNF) at Johannes Kepler University of Linz. In 2005 Falk was ranked #3 among the "Top 10" scientists in Upper Austria by the newspaper "OÖ Nachrichten". In 2008 he retired as Professor emeritus at the Institute of Organic chemistry of the JKU.

== Research interests ==
Falk's main research area is the structural analysis, synthesis, stereochemistry and photochemistry of plant and animal photosensitizing and photosensory pigments. The main group of compounds covered in his work are pigments derived from the fundamental phenanthro[1,10,9,8-opqra]perylene-7,14-dione chromophore with natural pigments like hypericin, stentorin, the fringelites, the gymnochromes, and blepharismin. In addition, he is focusing on hemin-analogous corrphycene derivatives (e.g. as potential blood substitutes and heme oxygenase blocker) as well as on other natural compounds such as the natural sun blocker urocanic acid. Furthermore, research on applied problems of industrial relevance, like oxidation, ozonization, non natural amino acids and catalysis have been pursued.

== Published works ==
=== Books ===
- Falk, Heinz (1978). Ausgewählte Übungsbeispiele Zur Nomenklatur Organischer Verbindungen. Wien, New York: Springer-Verlag. ISBN 978-0-387-81479-7.
- Falk, Heinz (1989). The Chemistry of Linear Oligopyrroles and Bile Pigments. Wien, New York: Springer-Verlag. ISBN 978-0-387-82112-2.
- Falk, Heinz (2026). The Diels–Alder Reaction as a Key Step in Natural Product Synthesis. Progress in the Chemistry of Organic Natural Products. Vol. 130. Cham: Springer. ISBN 978-3-032-09900-6.

=== Scientific articles ===
- H. Marko, N. Müller und H. Falk, Nuclear Magnetic Resonance Investigations of the Biliverdin/Apomyoglobin Complex. Eur. J. Biochem. 193, 573 (1990)
- H. Falk, H. Marko, N. Müller, W. Schmitzberger und H. Stumpe, Reconstitution of Apomyoglobin with Bile Pigments. Monatsh. Chem. 121, 893 (1990)
- H. Falk, H. Marko, N. Müller und W. Schmitzberger, On the Chemistry of Pyrrole Pigments 87.Mitt.: The Apomyoglobin Heme Pocket as a Reaction Vessel in Bile Pigment Chemistry. Monatsh. Chem. 121, 903 (1990)
- H. Falk und H. Marko, Reduction of a Bilindione-10-Thiol-Adduct as a Model for the Reduction Step of the Biliverdin Reductase System. Monatsh. Chem. 122, 319 (1991)
- U. Wagner, C. Kratky, H. Falk und H. Woess, Crystal Structure and Conformation of 10-Aryl-bilatrienes-abc. Monatsh. Chem. 122, 749 (1991)
- H. Falk und G. Schoppel, A Synthesis of Emodin Anthrone. Monatsh. Chem. 122, 739 (1991)
- H. Falk and W. Schmitzberger, On the Nature of "Soluble" Hypericin in Hypericum Species. Monatsh. Chem., 123, 731 (1992)
- H. Falk and D. Hemmer, On the Chemistry of Pyrrole Pigments, 88. Mitt.: Nonlinear Optical Properties of Linear Oligopyrroles. Monatsh. Chem. 123, 779 (1992)
- H. Falk and G. Schoppel, On the Synthesis of Hypericin by Oxidative Trimethylemodin Anthrone and Emodin Anthrone Dimerization: Isohypericin. Monatsh. Chem. 123, 931 (1992)
- H. Falk and W. Schmitzberger, On the Bromination of Hypericin: The Gymnochrome Chromophores. Monatsh. Chem. 124, 77 (1993)
- C. Etzlstorfer, H. Falk, N. Müller, W. Schmitzberger and U. Wagner, Tautomerism and Stereochemistry of Hypericin: Force Field, NMR, and X-ray Crystallographic Investigations. Monatsh. Chem., 124, 751 (1993)
- H. Falk and A. Suste, On the Chemistry of Pyrrole Pigments, XC: Pyridinologous Linear Tri- and Tetrapyrroles. Monatsh. Chem., 124, 881 (1993)
- H. Falk, J. Meyer and M. Oberreiter, A Convenient Semisynthetic Route to Hypericin. Monatsh. Chem., 124, 339 (1993)
- C. Etzlstorfer and H. Falk, Tautomerism and Stereochemistry of Isohypericin, Bromo-hypericines, and Gymnochromes: Force Field Investigations. Monatsh. Chem., 124, 1031 (1993)
- H. Pschierer, J. Friedrich, H. Falk and W. Schmitzberger, On the Correlation Between Pressure Shift and Solvent Shift: A Spectral Hole Burning Study. J. Phys. Chem., 97, 6902 (1993)
- A. Angerhofer, H. Falk, J. Meyer and G. Schoppel, The Lowest Triplet States of Hypericin and Isohypericin. J. Photochem. Photobiol., B20, 133 (1993)
- H. Falk and A. Suste, On the Chemistry of Pyrrole Pigments, XCI: Copper Complexes of Pyridinologous Linear Tri- and Tetrapyrroles as Cyclopropanation Catalysts. Monatsh. Chem., 125, 325 (1994)
- H. Falk and J. Meyer, On the Homo- and Heteroassociation of Hypericin. Monatsh. Chem., 125, 753 (1994)
- C. Etzlstorfer and H. Falk, Stereochemistry and Tautomerism of Stentorin, Isostentorin, and Fringelit D: Force Field Investigations. Monatsh. Chem., 125, 955 (1994)
- H. Falk, E. Mayr and A. Richter, Simple Diffuse Reflectance UV-Vis Spectroscopic Determination of Organic Pigments (Fringelites) in Fossils. Microchim. Acta, 117, 1 (1994)
- H. Falk and J. Leimhofer, Ozone as an Oxygen Source for Alkene Ene-Reactions. Monatsh. Chem., 126, 85 (1995)
- Q.-Q. Chen, H. Falk and R. Micura, On the Chemistry of Pyrrole Pigments, XCII: Syntheses of 1,2-Bis-pyrrolylethanes. Monatsh. Chem., 126, 473 (1995)
- H. Falk, C. Kratky, N. Müller, W. Schmitzberger and U. Wagner, Structure Determination of the Biliverdin Apomyoglobin Complex. Crystal Structure Analysis of Two Crystal Forms at 1.4 and 1.5 * Resolution. J. Mol. Biol., 247, 326 (1995)
- N. H. Tran-Thi and H. Falk, An Efficient Synthesis of the Plant Growth Hormone 1-Triacontanol. Monatsh. Chem., 126, 565 (1995)
- H. Falk and A. F. Vaisburg, Concerning the Absorption and Emission Properties of Phenanthro [1,10,9,8,o,p,q,r,a]perylene-7,14-dione. Monatsh. Chem., 126, 361 (1995)
- H. Falk and E. Mayr, Syntheses and Properties of Fringelite D (1,3,4,6,8,10,11,13-octahydroxy-phenanthro[1,10,9,8,o,p,q,r,a]perylene-7,14-dione). Monatsh. Chem., 126, 699 (1995)
- H. Falk, A.F. Vaisburg and A.M. Amer, On the Synthesis of w-Appended Hypericin Derivatives. Monatsh. Chem., 126, 993 (1995)
- R. Altmann and H. Falk, On the Syntheses and Chiroptical Properties of the Tri- and Tetragalloylquinic Acids. Monatsh. Chem. 126, 1225 (195)
- D. Shemin and H. Falk, Porphyrins and Bile Pigmens, Metabolism Encyclopedia of Human Biology, 2nd Ed., Academic Press, 177 (1996)
- H. Falk and Q.-Q. Chen, On the Chemistry of Pyrrole Pigments, XCVI: An Efficient Synyhesis of Corrphycenes. Mh. Chem., 127, 69 (1996)
- H. Falk and E. Mayr, Syntheses, Constitutions, and Properties of Stentorin and Isostentorin. Mh. Chem., 126, 1311 (1995)
- H. Falk and T.N.H. Tran, Synthesis and Properties of an w,wÕ - Appended Eighteen Carbon Chains Hypericin Derivative. Mh. Chem., 127, 717 (1996)
- C. Etzlstorfer, H. Falk, N. Müller and T.N.H. Tran, Structural Aspects and Electronic Absorption of the Hydroxyphenanthroperylene Quinones Fringelit D, Hypericin, and Stentorin. Mh. Chem., 127, 659 (1996)
- C. Etzlstorfer, H. Falk, E. Mayr and S. Schwarzinger, Concerning the Acidity and Hydrogen Bonding of Hydroxyphenantroperylene Quinones, like Fringelite D, Hypericin, and Stentorin. Mh. Chem., 127,1229 (1996)
- R. Altmann, C. Etzlstorfer and H. Falk, Chiroptical Properties and Absolute Configurations of the Hypericin Chromophore Propeller Enantiomers. Mh. Chem., 128, 785 (1997)
- H. Falk and M. Stanek, Two-Dimensional 1H and 13C NMR Spectroscopy and the Structural Aspects of Amylose and Amylopectin. Mh. Chem., 128, 777 (1997)
- H. Falk, A.A.O. Sarhan, H.T.N. Tran and R. Altmann, Synthesis and Properties of Hypericins Substituted with Acidic and Basic Residues: Hypericin Tetrasulfonic Acid – a Water Soluble Hypericin Derivative. Mh. Chem., 129, 309 (1998)
- E.I. Kapinuns, H. Falk and T.N.H. Tran, Spectroscopic Investigation of the Molecular Structures of Hypericin and its Salts. Mh. Chem., 130, 1237 - 1244 (1999)
- A.M. Amer, H. Falk, H.N.T. Tran, The Dissociation and Tautomerization Equilibria of Hypericin: Alkyl Protected Hydroxyl Derivatives. Mh. Chem., 130, 623 - 635 (1999)
- R. Obermüller, G. Schütz, H. Gruber and H. Falk, Concerning Regioselective Photochemical Intermolecular Proton Transfer from Hypericin. Mh. Chem., 130, 275 - 281 (1999)
- G. Kada, H. Falk and H. Gruber, Accurate Measurement of Avidin and Streptavidin in Crude Biofluids with a New, Optimized Biotin. Fluorescein Conjugate. Biochim. Biophys. Acta, 1427, 33 - 43 (1999)
- C. Etzlstorfer, I Gutman and H. Falk, Concerning the Deprotonation of the Photooxidized 3-Hypericinate Ion. Mh. Chem., 130, 1333 - 1339 (1999)
- T. Dax, H. Falk and E. Kapinus, A Structural Proof for the Hypericin 1,6-Dioxo Tautomer. Mh. Chem., 130, 827 - 831 (1999)
- H. Falk, Gosau Schleifsteine fuer den Fossiliensammler. Fossilien, 4, 248 - 250 (1999)
- H. Falk, Vom Photosensibilisator Hypericin zum Photorezeptor Stentorin - die Chemie der Phenanthroperylenchinone. Angew. Chemie, 111, 3306 - 3326 (1999)
- H. Falk, From the Photosensibilisator Hypericin to the Photoreceptor Stentorin - the Chemistry of the Phenanthroperylene Quinones. Angew. Chemie Int. Ed., 38, 3134 - 3154 (1999)
- S. Baumgartner, T. Dax, W. Praznik and H. Falk, Characterization of the high-molecular weight fructan isolated from garlic (Allium sativum L.). Carbohydrate Res., 328, 177-183 (2000)
- C. Etzlstorfer and H. Falk, Concerning the Association of Hypericin Tautomers and their Hypericinate Ions. Mh. Chem., 131, 333-340 (2000)
- T. Dax, E. Kapinus and H. Falk, A Remarkable Photoreaction of 3-O-Benzylhypericin. Helvetica Chimica Acta, 83, 1744-1752 (2000)
- B. Immitzer, C. Etzlstorfer, R. Obermüller, M. Sonnleitner, G. Schütz, and H. Falk, On the Photochemical Proton Expulsion Capability of Fringelite D — A Model of the Protist Photosensory Pigments of the Stentorin and Blepharismin Types. Mh. Chem., 131, 1039-1045 (2000)
- T. Dax, C. Etzlstorfer, and H. Falk, On the Ground State Energy Hypersurface of Blepharismins and Oxyblepharismins. Mh. Chem., 131, 1115-1122 (2000)
- B. Immitzer and H. Falk, Fringelite D, a Model of the Protist Photosensory Pigments of the Stentorin and Blepharismin Types: the Hypericin and Fringelite D Photosensitized Destruction of Bilirubin. Mh. Chem., 131, 1167-1171 (2000)
- T. Dax and H. Falk, An Unusual Photoreaction of 3,4,-Di-O-benzyl-hypericin. Mh. Chem., 131, 1217-1219 (2000)
- E. Delaey, R. Obermüller, I. Zupko, H. Falk, and P. de Witte, In vitro Study of the Photocytotoxicity of some Hypericin analogs on different Cell Lines. Photochem. Photobiol., 74, 164-171 (2001)
- R.A. Obermüller, K. Hohenthanner, and H. Falk, Towards Hypericin-Derived Potential Photdynamic Therapy Agents. Photochem. Photobiol., 74, 211-215 (2001)
- B. Tu, Q. Chen, F. Yan, J. Ma, K. Grubmayr, and H. Falk, Efficient Routes to w-Chloroalkyl Bilirubins and C12-N22 Bridged Biliverdins. Mh. Chem., 132, 693-705 (2001)
- R.A. Obermüller, T. Dax and H. Falk, Replacement of Methoxy- to tert-Butyl-Substitution on a Napththalene Residue – An Unexpected Reaction Observed During a Snieckus ortho-Lithiation. Mh. Chem., 132, 1057-1062 (2001)
- R.A. Obermüller and H. Falk, Concerning the Absorption and Photochemical Properties of an w-4-Dimethylaminobenzal Hypericin Derivative. Mh. Chem., 132, 1519-1526 (2001)
- R.A. Obermüller, C. Etzlstorfer and H. Falk, On the Chemistry of a Dibenzohypericin Derivative. Mh. Chem., 133, 89-96 (2002)
- J. Leonhartsberger and H. Falk, The Protonation and Deprotonation Equilibria of Hypericin Revisited. Mh. Chem., 133, 167-172 (2002)
- B. Lackner and H. Falk, Concerning the Diastereomerization of Stilbenoid Hypericin Derivatives. Mh. Chem., 133, 717-721 (2002)
- T.N. Tran and H. Falk, Concerning the Chiral Discrimination and Helix Inversion Barrier in Hypericinates and Hypericin Derivatives. Mh. Chem., 133, 1231-1237 (2002)
- M. Emsenhuber, P. Pöchlauer, J.-M. Aubry, V. Nardello and H. Falk, Evidence for the Generation of Singlet Oxygen (1O2, 1Dg) from Ozone Promoted by Inorganic Salts. Mh. Chem., 133, 387-391 (2003)
- M. Deak and H. Falk, On the Chemistry of the Resveratrol Diastereomers. Mh. Chem., 134, 883-888 (2003)
- T.A. Salama, B. Lackner and H. Falk, An Efficient Synthesis of O-Methyl Protected Emodin Aldehyde and Emodin Nitrile. Mh. Chem., 134, 1113-1119 (2003)
- Bettina Schwarzinger, and Heinz Falk, A Unique Photoreaction of Hypericinate Bound to Human Serum Albumin, Lipids, or Vesicles. Mh. Chem., 134, 1353-1358 (2003)
- Beate Hager, Mario Alva-Astudillo, and Heinz Falk, A Hemin-Analogous Corrphycene Derivative: Suppression of Heme Oxygenase and Reconstitution with Apomyoglobin. Mh. Chem., 134, 1499-1507 (2003)
- Tarek A. Salama, Bernd Lackner, and Heinz Falk, Synthesis of 6-Heterocyclically Appendend Tri-O-Methyl Protected 6-Desmethyl Emodin Derivatives. Mh. Chem., 135, 735-742 (2004)
- Thorsten Ganglberger, Walther G. Jary, Peter Pöchlauer, Jean-Marie Aubry, Veronique Nardello, and Heinz Falk, A Chemical (Dark) Source of Singlet Oxygen: Ozone Splitting Promoted by Tin(II) Salts. Mh. Chem., 135, 501-507 (2004)
- Walther G. Jary, Thorsten Ganglberger, Peter Pöchlauer, and Heinz Falk, Generation of Singlet Oxygen from Ozone Catalysed by Phosphinofer-rocenes. Mh. Chem., 136, 537-541 (2005)
- Bernd Lackner, Christoph Etzlstorfer and Heinz Falk, Synthesis and Properties of 10,11-Dibenzimidazolyl-10,11-didesmethyl-hypericin – The First Heterocyclically Substituted Hypericin Derivative. Mh. Chem., 135, 1157-1166 (2004)
- Bettina Schwarzinger and Heinz Falk, Concerning the Photodiastereomerization and Protic Equilibria of Urocanic Acid and its Complex with Human Serum Albumin. Mh. Chem., 135, 1297-1304 (2004)
- Mario Waser, Heinz Falk, Peter Pöchlauer and Walther G. Jary, Concerning Chemistry, Reactivity, and Mechanism of Transition Metal Catalysed Oxidation of Benzylic Compounds by Means of Ozone. Journal of Molecular Catalysis A - Chemical, 236, 187-193 (2005)
- Mario Waser and Heinz Falk, Intramolecularly Friedel-Crafts Acylated Emodin Derivatives: An Access to the Cores of Angucyclinones, Anthracyclinones, and to Hypericin Analogues. Mh. Chem., 136, 609-618 (2005)
- Bernd Lackner, Yulita Popova, Christiph Etzlstorfer, Andrija A. Smelcerovic, Christian W. Klampfl, and Heinz Falk, Syntheses and Properties of Two Heterocyclically Substituted Hypericin Derivatives: 10,11-Dibenzothiazolyl-10,11-didesmethyl-hypericin and 10,11-Dibenzoxazolyl-10,11-didesmethylhypericin. Mh. Chem., 136, 777-793 (2005)
- Mario Waser, Bernd Lackner, Joachim Zuschrader, Norbert Müller, and Heinz Falk, An efficient regioselective synthesis of endocrocin and structural related natural anthraquinones starting from emodin. Tetrahedron Lett., 46, 2377-2380 (2005)
- Bernd Lackner, Klaus Bretterbauer, and Heinz Falk, An Efficient Route to Emodic Amine and Analogous O-Methyl Protected Derivatives Starting from Emodin. Mh. Chem., 136, 1629-1639 (2005)
- Mario Waser, Yulita Popova, Christoph Etzlstorfer, Werner F. Huber, and Heinz Falk, Syntheses, Photochemical Properties, and Tautomerism of Intramolecularly Friedel-Crafts Acylated Hypericin Derivatives. Mh. Chem., 136, 1221-1231 (2005)
- David Geißlmeir, Walther G. Jary and Heinz Falk, The TEMPO/Copper Catalyzed Oxidation of Primary Alcohols to Aldehydes Using Oxygen as Stoichiometric Oxidant. Mh. Chem., 136, 1591-1599 (2005)
- Mario Waser, Yulita Popova, Christian W. Klampfl, and Heinz Falk, 9,12-Dibenzothiazolylhypericin and 10,11-Dibenzothiazolyl-10,11-Didemethylhypericin: Photochemical Properties of Hypericin Derivatives Depending on the Substitution Site. Mh.Chem., 136, 1791-1797 (2005)
- Klaus Wolkenstein, Jürgen H. Gross, Heinz Falk, and Heinz F. Schöler, Preservation of hypericin and related polycyclic quinone pigments in fossil crinoids. Proceedings of the Royal Society B, 273, 451-456 (2006)
- Beate Hager, Bettina Schwarzinger and Heinz Falk, Concerning the Thermal Diastereomerization of the Green Fluorescent Protein Chromophore. Mh. Chem., 137, 163-168 (2006)
- Mario Waser and Heinz Falk, Condensed Emodin Derivatives and Their Applicability for the Synthesis of a Fused Heterocyclic Hypericin Derivative. Eur. J. Org. Chem., 1200-1206 (2006)
- Mario Waser and Heinz Falk, Towards Second Generation Hypericin Based Photosensitizers for Photodynamic Therapy. Curr. Org. Chem. 11: 547-558 (2007)
- Heinz Falk: Karl Schlögl. Obituary. Mh. Chem., 138 (2007)
- Karoline Fendler, Beate Hager, and Heinz Falk, The Thermal Diastereomerization of the Tryptophane-Derived Green Fluorescent Protein Chromophore. Mh. Chem., 138, 859-862 (2007)
- Mieke Roelants, Heinz Falk, Bernd Lackner, Mario Waser, Peter A.M. de Witte, OC222 Bathochromically shifted hypericin derivatives: photosensitizing properties. Abstr. of 12th Congress of the European Society for Photobiology 2007, University of Bath, UK, Sept 1/6, (2007)
- Heinz Falk, Die 44. Mineralientage München - ein Rückblick. Fossilien, 25, 2-4 (2008)
- Heinz Falk. Karl Schlögl, Nachruf. Almanach d. Öst. Akademie der Wiss., 157, 469-477 (2008)
- S. Aigner and Hh. Falk: A microwave-assisted synthesis of phenanthroperylene quinones as exemplified with hypericin. Monatsh. Chem. 139 (2008) 991–993.
- Zuschrader, G. Reiter and H. Falk: ω,ω’-Urea- and dithioacetal-derivatives of hypericin. Monatsh. Chem. 139 (2008) 995–998.
- D. Geißlmeir and H. Falk: ω,ω’-Appended nucleo-base derivatives of hypericin. Monatsh. Chem. 139 (2008) 1127-1136.
- J. Zuschrader, W. Schöfberger, and H. Falk: A carbohydrate-linked hypericinic photosensitizing agent. Monatsh. Chem. 139 (2008) 1387–1390.
- S. Aigner and H. Falk: On synthesis and properties of hypericin-porphyrin hybrids. Monatsh. Chem. 139 (2008) 1513–1518.
- M. Roelants, B. Lackner, M. Waser, H. Falk, P. Agostinis, H. Van Poppel, and P. A. M. de Witte: In vitro study of the phototoxicity of bathochromically-shifted hypericin derivatives. Photochem. Photobiol. Sci. 8 (2009) 822–829.
- B. Hager, W. S. L. Strauss, and H. Falk: Cationic Hypericin Derivatives as Novel Agents with Photobactericidal Activity: Synthesis and Photodynamic Inactivation of Propionibacterium acnes. Photochem. Photobiol. 85 (2009) 1201–1206.
- H. Falk: Die 46. Mineralientage München: ein Rückblick. Fossilien 27 (2010) 3–5.
- H. Falk: Museumsportrait: Die Dauerausstellung „Natur“ im Schlossmuseum Linz. Fossilien 27 (2010) 300–303.
- H. Falk: Ein riesiger Mondfisch aus Österreich. Fossilien 27 (2010) 304–307.
- K. Wolkenstein, J. H. Gross, and H. Falk: Boron-containing organic pigments from a Jurassic red alga. Proc. Natl. Acad. Sci. USA 107 (2010) 19374–19378.
- H. Falk: Die 47. Mineralientage München: ein Rückblick. Fossilien 28 (2011) 3–5.
- H. Falk: Museumsprortrait: Das Kotsiomitis-Museum in Ligurio bei Epidauros. Fossilien 28 (2011) 57–59.
- K. Wolkenstein and H. Falk: Spuren des Lebens: Organische Verbindungen im Stein. Nachr. Chem. 59(5) (2011) 517–520.
- M. Waser and H. Falk: Progress in the Chemistry of Second Generation Hypericin Based Photosensitizers. Curr. Org. Chem. (2011) 3894–3907.
- H. Falk: Die 48. Mineralientage München: ein Rückblick. Fossilien 29 (2012) 3–6.
- I. Teasdale, M. Waser, S. Wilfert, H. Falk, and O. Brüggemann: Photoreactive, water-soluble conjugates of hypericin with polyphosphacenes. Monatsh. Chem./Chem. Monthly 147 (2012) 355–360.
- H. Falk: Emanuel Vogel, Nachruf. Almanach d. Österr. Akademie d. Wiss. 161 (2012) 547–552.
- H. Falk: Das Neueste aus der Welt der Mikro-Kameras: DigiMicro Mobile. Leitfossil.de (Mikromania) (2012) 28. 5. 2012.
- H. Falk: Der neue Sauriersaal des Naturhistorischen Museums Wien. Fossilien 29 (2012) 286–290.
- H. Falk: Naturhistorisches Museum Wien: Der Neue Meteoritensaal. Leitfossil.de (2012) 3.12.2012.
- H. Falk: Naturhistorisches Museum Wien: Die Neuen Anthropologiesäle. Leitfossil.de (2013) 28.4.2013.
- H. Falk: Heinz A. Staab, Nachruf. Almanach d. Österr. Akademie d. Wiss. 162 (2012) 503–510.
- H. Falk: American Museum of Natural History New York. Leitfossil.de (2013) 12.9.2013
- H. Falk: Friedrich Simony zum 200sten Geburtstag. Leitfossil.de (2013) 2.11.2013
- H. Falk: Die 50. Mineralientage München – ein Rückblick. Fossilien 31 (2014) 60–62.
- H. Falk: Ausstellung im NHM Wien: Gabonionta — mehrzellige Organismen vor 2,1 Milliarden Jahren! Leitfossil.de (2014) 17.3.2014.
- H. Falk: „Tintenfisch und Ammonit“ Ausstellung im Biologiezentrum des Oberösterreichischen Landesmuseums in Linz. Leitfossil.de (2014) 25. 4. 2014.
- W. P. Pfeiffer, S. K. Dey, D. A. Lightner, H. Falk: Homorubins and homoverdins. Monatsh. Chem./Chem. Monthly 145 (2014) 963-981.
- K. Wolkenstein, H. Sun, C. Griesinger, H. Falk: Identification of organic pigments in macrofossils: analytical challenges and recent advances. Abstr. of 2014 The Geological Society of America Meeting, Vancouver, B.C. (10–22 Oct. 2014), paper No. 108-14.
- H. Falk: Mammut-Eismumie aus Sibirien zu Gast im Naturhistorischen Museum Wien. Leitfossil.de (2015) 2. 1. 2015.
- H. Falk: Die 51. Mineralientage München – ein Rückblick. Fossilien 32 (2015) 59–61.
- H. Falk: Chemofossilien. Leitfossil.de (2015) 3. 3. 2015.
- H. Falk, A. D. Kinghorn: Foreword. Progr. Chem Org. Nat. Prod. 100 (2015) v-vi.
- K. Wolkenstein, H. Sun, C. Griesinger, H. Falk: Exceptional preservation of polyketide secondary metabolites in macrofossils. Abstr. 27th Intern. Meeting on Org. Geochem. Sept. 13–18, Prague, Cz, 226.
- H. Falk: Paratethys-Stromatolithen aus Ritzing (Burgenland, Österreich) als Zeugen einer Klimakrise im mittelmiozän. Leitfossil.de (2015) 14. 10. 2015.
- H. Falk: Naturhistorisches Museum Wien: Die neuen Säle der Prähistorie. Leitfossil.de (2015) 14. 10. 2015.
- K. Wolkenstein, H. Sun, C. Griesinger, H. Falk: Structure and Absolute Configuration of Jurassic Polyketide-Derived Spiroborate Pigments Obtained from Microgram Quantities. J. Am. Chem. Soc. 137 (2015) 13460-13463.
- H. Falk: Der Specht klopft im Biologiezentrum Linz. Leitfossil.de (2016) 20. 1. 2016.
- H. Falk: Wo die Wiener Mammuts grasten — Naturwissenschaftliche Entdeckungsreisen durch das heutige Wien. Leitfossil.de (2016) 10. 5. 2016
- H. Falk: Ein Ammoniten-Denkmal auf der Rossmoosalm. Leitfossil.de (2016) 9. 6. 2016.
- H. Falk: Augensteine — Zeugen der großen Umbrüche in den Ostalpen in den letzten 35 Millionen Jahren. Leitfossil.de (2016) 13. 8. 2016.
- D. Kinghorn, H. Falk, S. Gibbons, J. Kobayashi: Phytocannabinoids — Unraveling the Complex Chemistry and Pharmacology of Cannabis sativa, Preface. Prog. Chem Org. Nat. Prod. 103 (2017) v-vi.
- H. Falk, K. Wolkenstein: Natural Product Molecular Fossils. Prog. Chem Org. Nat. Prod. 104 (2017) 1–126.

=== Patents ===
- Process for the N-alkylation or ureas US Pat. 5124451 - Filed Jul 10, 1991 - Chemie Linz GmbH
- Process for the N-alkylation of ureas US Pat. 5169954 - Filed Dec 16, 1991 - Chemie Linz GmbH
- Process for the preparation of pure N,N'-asymmetrically substituted phenylureas US Pat. 5283362 - Filed Jul 31, 1992 - Chemie Linz GmbH
- Process for the preparation of Isocyanic Acid by Decomposition of N,N-trisubstituted Ureas Eur. Pat. EP 0582863A2 - Filed Feb 16, 1994 - US Pat. Nr. 5360601 Filed Nov 1, 1994 - Chemie Linz GmbH
- Isocyanates by Decomposition of N,N,N-trisubstituted Ureas Eur. Pat. EP 0583637A1 - Filed Feb 23, 1994 - Chemie Linz GmbH
- Amine-oxides US Pat. 5409532 - Filed Jan 21, 1993 - Lenzing AG

== Awards ==
- Theodor Körner Prize for Science and Art in Austria, 1970
- Ernst Späth Prize of the Austrian Academy of Sciences, 1976
- Sandoz Prize, 1977
- Election to corresponding member of the New York Academy of Sciences, 1989
- Election to corresponding member of the Mathematical and Natural Sciences Class of the Austrian Academy of Sciences, 1992
- Upper Austrian Prize for Science, 1993
- Election to full member of the Mathematical and Natural Sciences Class of the Austrian Academy of Sciences, 1997
- Josef Loschmidt Medal of the Austrian Chemical Society, 1998
- Scientific award of the Rudolf Trauner Stiftung, 2003
- Silver medal of the government of Upper Austria, 2009
