= Tullnerbach =

- Municipality
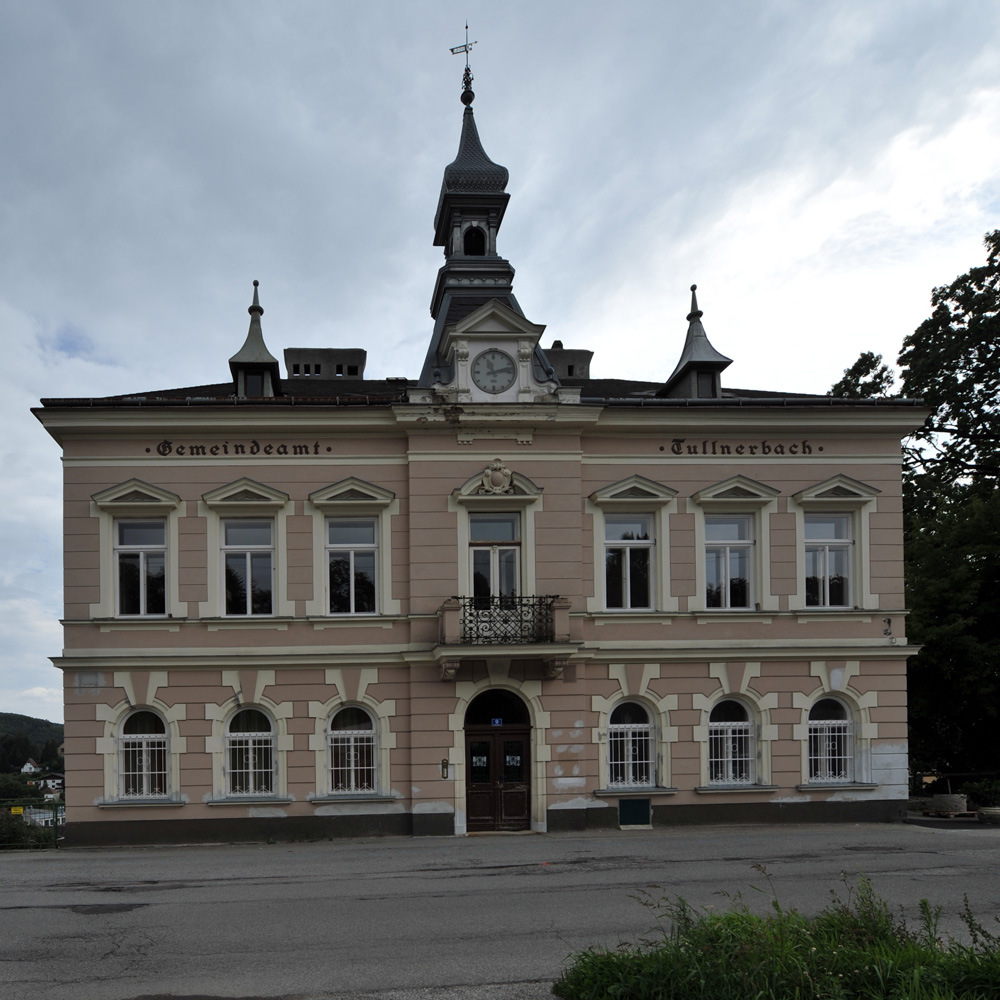
- The old town hall

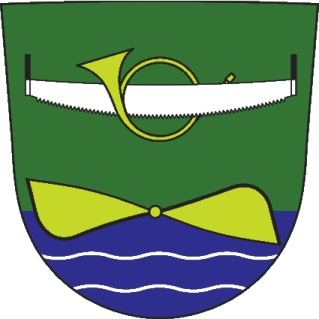
- Coat of arms

- Location within Austria
- Coordinates: 48°12′00″N 16°06′00″E
- Country: Austria
- State: Lower Austria
- District: Sankt Pölten-Land

Government
  - Mayor: Johann Novomestsky

Area
  - Total: 20.24 km^{2} (7.81 sq mi)
- Elevation: 350 m (1,150 ft)

Population (2018-01-01)
  - Total: 2,782
  - Density: 137.5/km^{2} (356.0/sq mi)
- Time zone: UTC+1 (CET)
  - Summer (DST): UTC+2 (CEST)
- Postal code: 3013 Tullnerbach-Lawies; 3011 Untertullnerbach
- Area code: 02233
- Vehicle registration: PL
- Website: www.tullnerbach.gv.at

Tullnerbach is a municipality in the district of St. Pölten-Land in the Austrian state of Lower Austria. It was here in 1901 that Wilhelm Kress failed at his attempt of motorized seaplane flight on the Wienerwaldsee. The town belonged to Wien-Umgebung which was dissolved in 2016.

== Population ==
Historical population
| Year | Pop. | ±% |
|---|---|---|
| 1869 | 505 | — |
| 1880 | 833 | +65.0% |
| 1890 | 1,288 | +54.6% |
| 1900 | 1,701 | +32.1% |
| 1910 | 1,933 | +13.6% |
| 1923 | 2,100 | +8.6% |
| 1934 | 1,949 | −7.2% |
| 1939 | 1,623 | −16.7% |
| 1951 | 1,763 | +8.6% |
| 1961 | 1,609 | −8.7% |
| 1971 | 1,683 | +4.6% |
| 1981 | 1,994 | +18.5% |
| 1991 | 2,292 | +14.9% |
| 2001 | 2,332 | +1.7% |
| 2007 | 2,594 | +11.2% |

== Transport ==
Tullnerbach is located on the Westbahn, on which REX51 and SS50 pass from Wien Westbahnhof to Sankt Poelten / Neulengbach.

Tullnerbach is located in the area of the transpprt association Verkehrsverbund Ost-Region (VOR).
