= On the coloured light of the binary stars and some other stars of the heavens =

1842 treatise by Christian Doppler

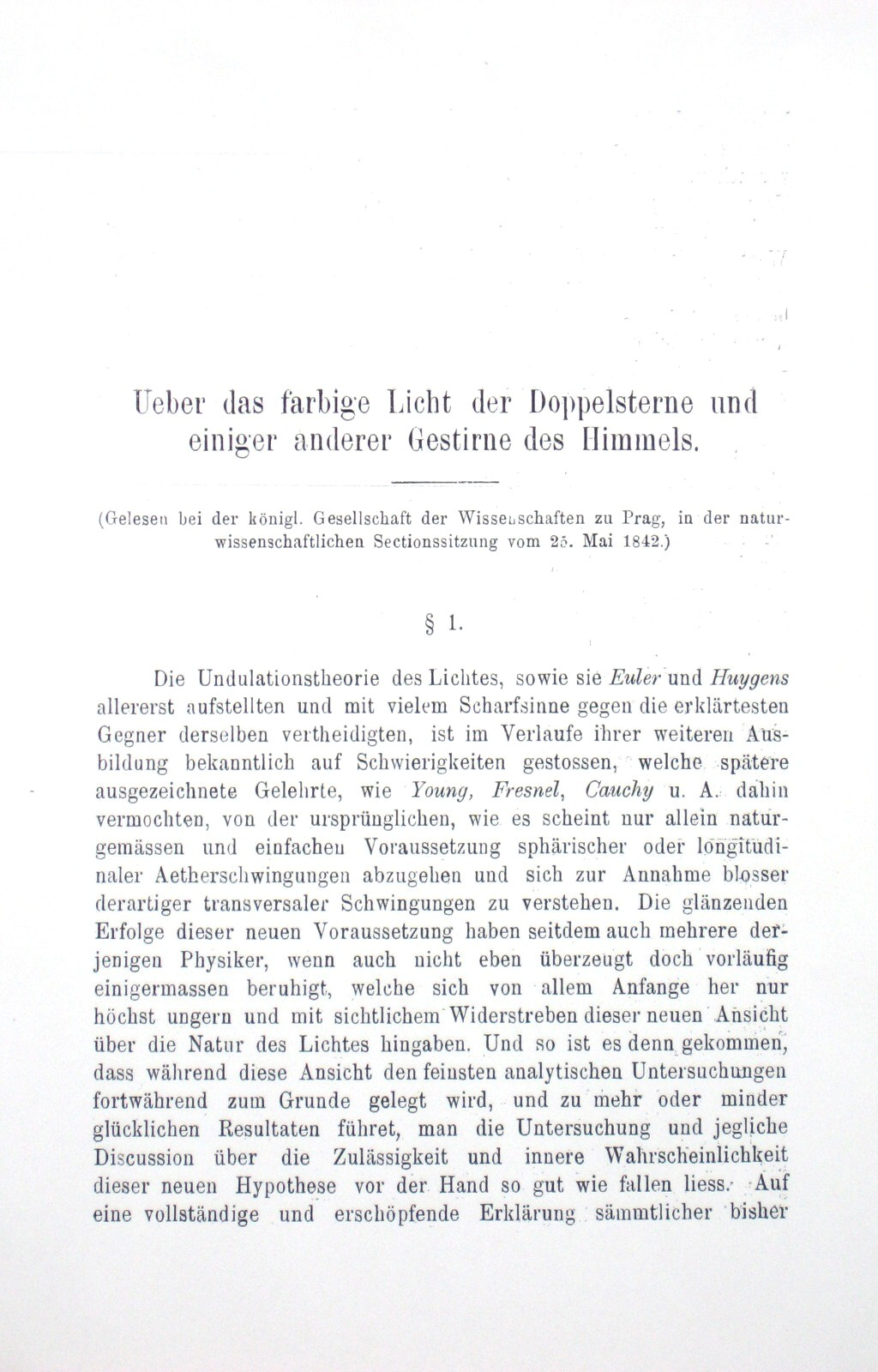
First page of the paper, from a 1903 reprint

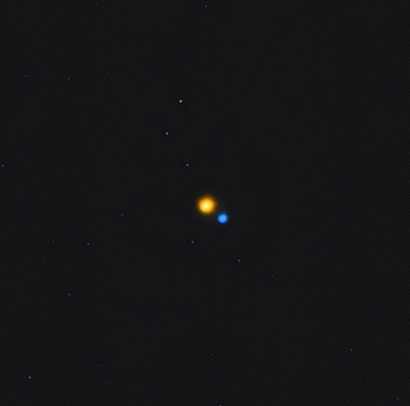
Albireo, a double star whose two stars differ in colour

On the coloured light of the binary stars and some other stars of the heavens (German: Über das farbige Licht der Doppelsterne und einiger anderer Gestirne des Himmels) is a paper by the Austrian physicist Christian Doppler, first presented in Prague in 1842. In it, Doppler proposed that the observed frequency of a wave depends on whether the source of the wave and the observer are moving towards or away from each other. This idea is now known as the Doppler effect.

Doppler used the principle to explain why the stars in some double stars appear strongly coloured. That explanation was wrong, because it rested on mistaken assumptions about starlight and about how fast stars move, but his formulas for the change in frequency were correct. The principle was confirmed for sound in 1845, but some scientists still rejected it during Doppler's lifetime. Astronomers began using it to measure the motion of stars in the late 1860s, and it is now one of the main tools of astronomy.

== Background ==
In 1841 Doppler became professor of elementary mathematics and practical geometry at the State Technical Academy in Prague. He was interested in astronomy, and in particular in the aberration of starlight discovered by James Bradley in 1727. This is a small yearly change in the apparent positions of the stars, caused by Earth's motion around the Sun combined with the finite speed of light. Doppler wondered whether Earth's motion would also affect the colour of a star. Star catalogues of the time listed binary stars (pairs of stars orbiting each other) whose two stars had contrasting colours such as red and blue, and Doppler thought that such stars might move fast enough for their motion to change their colour.

The paper's subtitle, Versuch einer das Bradley'sche Aberrations-Theorem als integrirenden Theil in sich schliessenden allgemeineren Theorie ("Attempt at a more general theory that includes Bradley's aberration theorem as an integral part"), reflects this link with Bradley's work.

== Presentation and publication ==
Doppler read the paper at a meeting of the Royal Bohemian Society of Sciences on 25 May 1842. The meeting was chaired by the mathematician Bernard Bolzano, and only five regular members of the society were present. The paper was printed in the society's proceedings, the Abhandlungen der Königlichen Böhmischen Gesellschaft der Wissenschaften, and was also published separately in Prague in 1842. The volume of the proceedings that contains it is dated 1843, so some sources give that year instead.

== Summary ==
The paper is divided into eleven numbered sections. Doppler begins with the wave theory of light, in which light was thought to be a vibration of the aether, an invisible medium then believed to fill space. He notes that scientists such as Thomas Young and Augustin-Jean Fresnel had concluded that these vibrations are transverse (at right angles to the direction of travel), but he says that he prefers the older idea of longitudinal vibrations (along the direction of travel), which he calls the more natural one. He states that the colour of light depends on how many waves reach the eye each second and its brightness on the size of the vibrations, and that the same is true of the pitch and loudness of sound.

Doppler then argues that what an observer perceives depends on the motion of the source and the observer. He compares this to a ship: a ship steering into the waves meets more of them in a given time than a ship at rest or one moving in the same direction as the waves. He derives formulas for two cases, an observer moving towards or away from a stationary source, and a source moving towards or away from a stationary observer. For light, his results amount to the modern rule that the fractional change in frequency is equal to the speed along the line of sight divided by the speed of light. He illustrates them with sound. For example, if a source of sound moves away from a listener at the speed of sound, the listener hears the note an octave lower.

For light, Doppler takes the speed of light as 42,000 Meilen (German miles) per second and the limits of the visible spectrum as 458 and 727 trillion vibrations per second. From these figures he calculates that a star moving away at 19,000 miles per second would become invisible, and that a speed of about 33 miles per second would be enough to change its colour noticeably. He assumes that the natural colour of stars is white or pale yellow, so that a star approaching fast enough would appear violet and one moving away would appear red.

Doppler applies this theory to double stars. He divides them into two groups. In the first, one star is clearly brighter than the other; the brighter star is white, while its companion may be green, blue, violet, orange or red. In the second, the two stars are about equally bright and usually have contrasting or complementary colours. He rejects the view that these colours are an illusion caused by contrast. He also points out that the colours given for many double stars in Struve's recent catalogue differ from those in William Herschel's older one, and he argues that this shows the colours have really changed over time.

The "other stars" of the title are variable stars and "new stars", such as those seen in 1572 and 1604 (SN 1572 and SN 1604). He describes the star of 1572 as white at its brightest, then yellow and red before it faded from view, and the star of 1604 as passing through all the colours of the rainbow before it disappeared. Doppler also mentions the claim that Sirius, now white, was once red. He suggests that these stars, like double stars, change colour because they move at high speed. He adds that the period of the variable star Mira, which he gives as varying between 328½ and 335½ days, might be affected by Earth's own motion around the Sun. In the last section he predicts that his principle will give astronomers a way to measure the motions and distances of stars that are too far away for other methods.

== Errors ==
Doppler's astronomical arguments rested on two incorrect assumptions: that stars emit light mainly in the visible part of the spectrum, and that stars often move at a large fraction of the speed of light. Stellar motion does not noticeably change the overall colour of a star, so his explanation of the colours of double stars was mistaken, even though his formulas for the change in frequency were correct. Doppler also believed that his principle could not apply to light if light consisted of transverse waves.

== Legacy ==
Confirmation of the effect for light had to wait for the development of astronomical spectroscopy. In 1868 the English astronomer William Huggins reported a shift in the spectral lines of Sirius, which convinced many scientists that the optical Doppler effect was real. The German astronomer Hermann Carl Vogel used the effect to measure the rotation of the Sun, publishing the first conclusive demonstration in 1872, and in 1892 he published the first accurate measurements of the speeds of stars along the line of sight (radial velocities). The Russian astronomer Aristarkh Belopolsky demonstrated the effect for light in the laboratory in 1901.

The Doppler effect is now used to measure the motions of stars and galaxies, to detect planets orbiting other stars, and in medical ultrasound.
