= Ronald Micura =

Austrian chemist

- Born: 1970 (age 55–56); Linz
- Education: University of Linz
- Awards: Lieben Prize
- Scientific career
- Fields: Biochemistry
- Workplaces: University of Innsbruck
- Doctoral advisor: Karl Grubmayr

Ronald Micura is an Austrian chemist. He received his PhD working in the field of phycobilin pigments under the supervision of Karl Grubmayr in 1995. He was awarded the Lieben Prize in 2005.

Micura studied chemistry at the Johannes Kepler University Linz, where he also received his Ph.D. in 1995. After postdoc positions at the ETH Zurich 1996-1997 and the Skaggs Institute for Chemical Biology 1997-1998, both with Albert Eschenmoser (holding such a position "in the 3rd generation", after his PhD supervisor Grubmayr 1982/83, and the latter's PhD supervisor Heinz Falk in 1971), he returned to Linz leading a research group. Micura moved to the University of Innsbruck in 2002, where he submitted his Habilitation, became full professor (non-tenured) in 2004, and was promoted to a tenured position in 2008.
