= Christian Doppler =

Austrian mathematician and physicist (1803–1853)

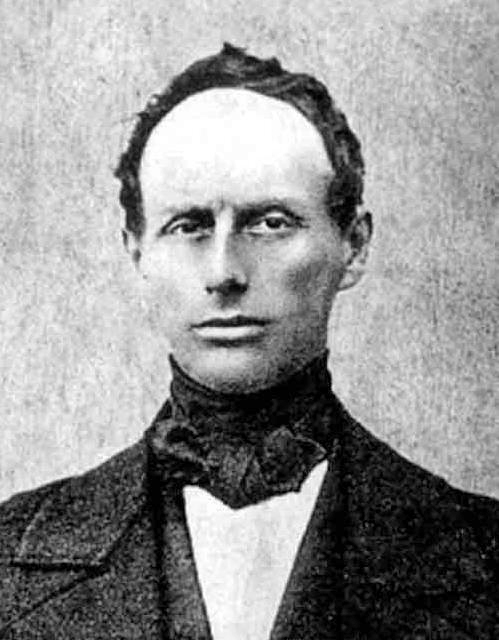
- Born: Christian Andreas Doppler; 29 November 1803; Salzburg, Electorate of Salzburg, Holy Roman Empire
- Died: 17 March 1853 (aged 49); Venice, Kingdom of Lombardy–Venetia, Austrian Empire
- Resting place: San Michele Cemetery, Venice
- Education: University of Vienna; Imperial–Royal Polytechnic Institute
- Known for: Doppler effect (1842)
- Spouse: Mathilde Sturm (m. 1836)
- Children: 5
- Scientific career
- Fields: Mathematics; physics
- Workplaces: Prague Polytechnic (1837–1847); Academy of Mines and Forests (1847–1849); University of Vienna (1850–1853)
- Notable students: Gregor Mendel

Christian Andreas Doppler (/ˈdɒplər/; German: [ˈdɔplɐ]; 29 November 1803 – 17 March 1853) was an Austrian mathematician and physicist. He formulated the principle – now known as the Doppler effect – that the observed frequency of a wave depends on the relative speed of the source and the observer.

== Biography ==
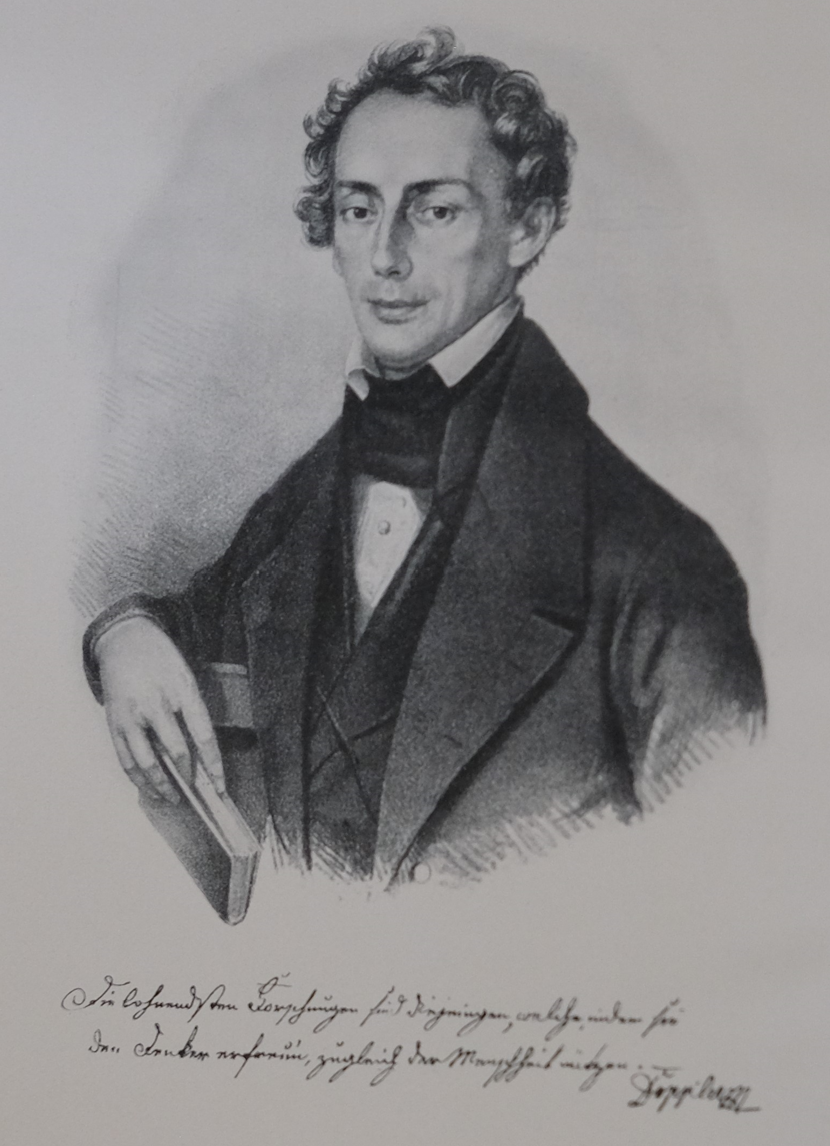
Portrait of Doppler in a 1907 copy of "Abhandlungen," no.161

=== Early life and education ===
Doppler was born in Salzburg (today Austria) in 1803. Doppler was the second son of Johann Evangelist Doppler and Theresia Seeleuthner (Doppler). Doppler's father, Johann Doppler, was a third-generation stone mason in Salzburg. As a young boy, Doppler showed promise for his family's trade. However, due to his weak health, Doppler's father encouraged him instead to pursue a career in business. Doppler started elementary education at the age of 13. After completion, he moved on to secondary education at a school in Linz. Doppler's proficiency in mathematics was discovered by Simon Stampfer, a mathematician in Salzburg. Upon his recommendation, Doppler took a break from high school to attend the Polytechnic Institute in Vienna in 1822. Doppler returned to Salzburg in 1825 to finish his secondary education. After completing high school, Doppler studied philosophy in Salzburg and mathematics and physics at the University of Vienna and Imperial–Royal Polytechnic Institute (now TU Wien). In 1829, he was chosen for an assistant position to Professor Adam von Burg at the Polytechnic Institute of Vienna, where he continued his studies.

In 1835, he decided to immigrate to the United States to pursue a position in academia. Before departing for the United States, Doppler was offered a teaching position at a state-operated high school in Prague, which convinced him to stay in Europe. Shortly after, in 1837 he was appointed as an associate professor of math and geometry at the Prague Polytechnic Institute (now Czech Technical University in Prague). He received a full professorship position in 1841.

=== Family ===
In 1836, Doppler married Mathilde Sturm, the daughter of goldsmith Franz Sturm. Doppler and Mathilde had five children together. Their first child was Mathilde Doppler who was born in 1837. Doppler's second child, Ludwig Doppler was born in 1838. Two years later, in 1840 Adolf Doppler was born. Doppler's fourth child, Bertha Doppler was born in 1843. Their last child Hermann was born in 1845.

=== Development of the Doppler effect ===
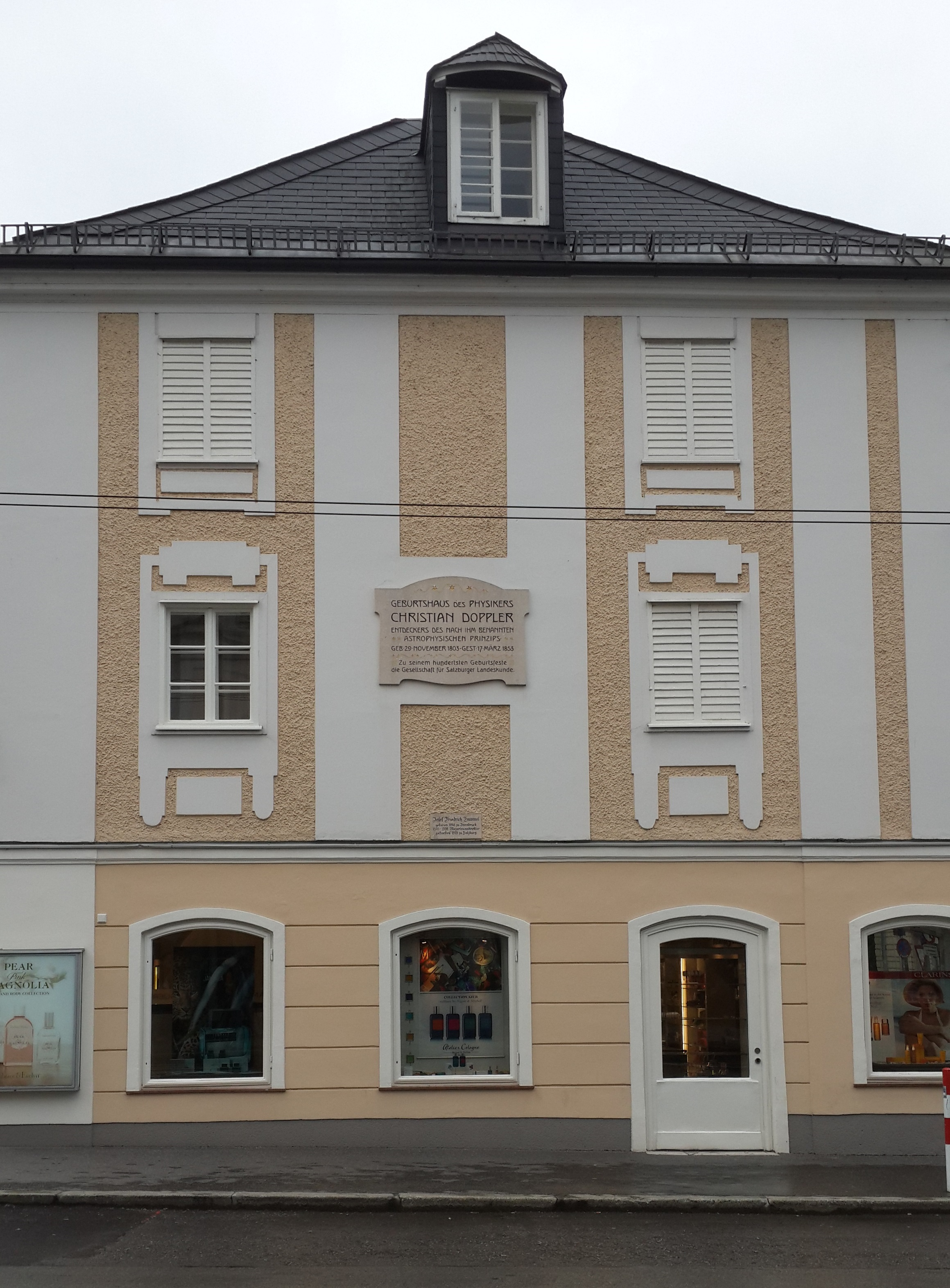
Doppler's birth house in the Makart square in Salzburg, just next door to where Mozart's family had lived. A Doppler research and memorial society is now housed there.

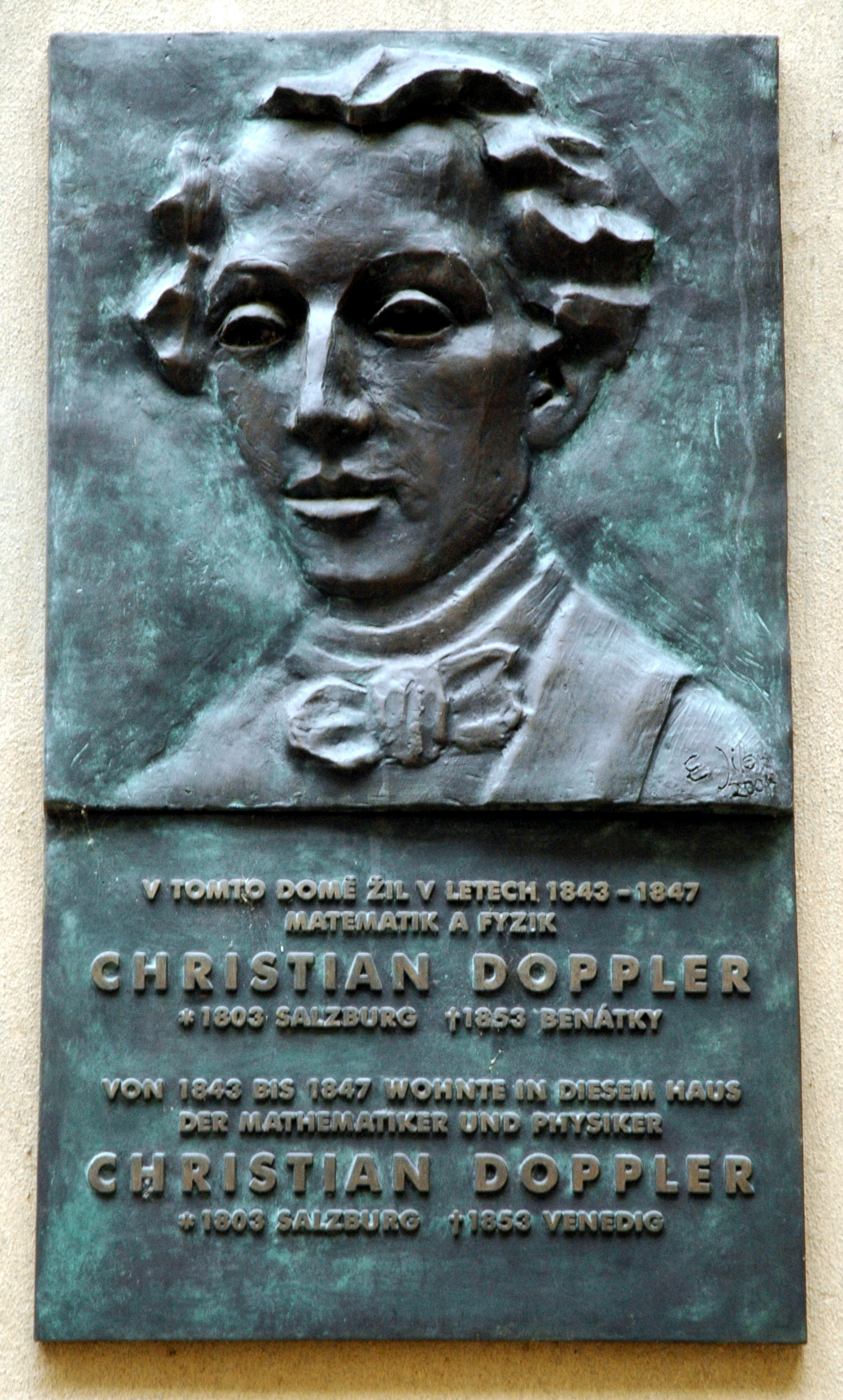
Plaque on the house in Prague in which Doppler lived from 1843 to 1847

In 1842, at the age of 38, Doppler gave a lecture to the Royal Bohemian Society of Sciences and subsequently published Über das farbige Licht der Doppelsterne und einiger anderer Gestirne des Himmels ("On the coloured light of the binary stars and some other stars of the heavens"). In this work, Doppler postulated his principle (later named the Doppler effect) that the observed frequency of a wave depends on the relative speed of the source and the observer, and he later tried to use this concept to explain the visible colours of binary stars (this hypothesis was later proven wrong). Doppler also incorrectly believed that if a star were to exceed 136,000 kilometers per second in radial velocity, then it would not be visible to the human eye.

=== Later life ===
Doppler continued working as a professor at the Prague Polytechnic, publishing over 50 articles on mathematics, physics and astronomy, but in 1847 he left Prague for the professorship of mathematics, physics, and mechanics at the Academy of Mines and Forests (its successor is the University of Miskolc) in Selmecbánya (then Kingdom of Hungary, now Banská Štiavnica Slovakia).

Doppler's research was interrupted by the Hungarian Revolution of 1848. In 1849, he fled to Vienna and in 1850 was appointed head of the Institute for Experimental Physics at the University of Vienna. While there, Doppler, along with Franz Unger, influenced the development of young Gregor Mendel, the founding father of genetics, who was a student at the University of Vienna from 1851 to 1853.

=== Death ===
Doppler died on 17 March 1853 at age 49 from a pulmonary disease in Venice (at that time part of the Austrian Empire). His tomb is in the San Michele cemetery on the Venetian island of San Michele.

== Full name ==
Some confusion exists about Doppler's full name. Doppler referred to himself as Christian Doppler. The records of his birth and baptism stated Christianus Andreas Dopler. Doppler's middle name is shared by his great-great-grandfather Andreas Doppler. Forty years after Doppler's death the misnomer Johann Christian Doppler was introduced by the astronomer Julius Scheiner. Scheiner's mistake has since been copied by many.

== Works ==
- Christian Doppler (1803–1853). Wien: Böhlau, 1992.
  - Bd. 1: ISBN 3-205-05483-0
    - 1. Teil: Helmuth Grössing (unter Mitarbeit von B. Reischl): Wissenschaft, Leben, Umwelt, Gesellschaft;
    - 2. Teil: Karl Kadletz (unter Mitarbeit von Peter Schuster und Ildikó Cazan-Simányi) Quellenanhang.
  - Bd. 2: ISBN 3-205-05508-X
    - 3. Teil: Peter Schuster: Das Werk.

== See also ==
- List of Austrian scientists
- List of Austrians
- List of minor planets named after people
