= Maria Wähnl =

Austrian astronomer (1908–1989)

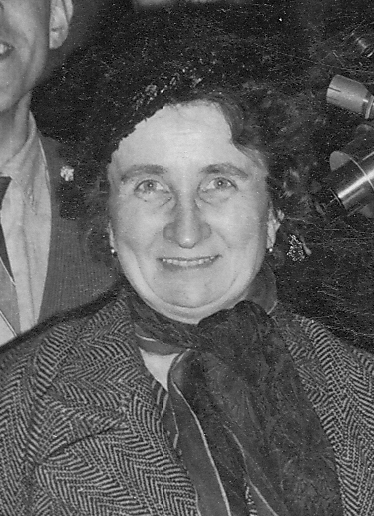
- Born: 9 December 1908; Vienna, Austria-Hungary
- Died: 28 December 1989 (aged 81); Vienna, Austria
- Education: University of Vienna
- Scientific career
- Workplaces: University of Vienna; Urania Public Observatory

Maria Emma Wähnl (9 December 1908 – 28 December 1989) was an Austrian astronomer. She worked at the University of Vienna's Observatory and the Urania Public Observatory. She initiated the publication of the Astronomisches Jahrbuch (Astronomical Yearbook).

== Biography ==
Wähnl was born on 9 December 1908 in Vienna, Austria-Hungary. Her family were from the Fichtel Mountains in Germany.

Wähnl studied astronomy at the University of Vienna, graduating with her doctorate in 1938. After passing the rigorous induction course, Wähnl was employed at the Junkers aircraft factory in Dessau, Saxony-Anhalt, working with the aerodynamics group. She worked in aircraft construction throughout World War II and was a member of the National Socialist Women's League. Wähnl became unemployed after the fall of the Nazi regime in 1945 and took on private students.

In 1949, Wähnl was hired as a computer assistant at the University of Vienna's Observatory, but was only permitted to be employed half time as she was over 40 years of age. In 1952, the Vienna University Observatory lent the Urania Public Observatory a 135mm refracting telescope and Wähnl was appointed manager. She offered astronomy courses for beginners and advanced students, as well as organising scientific lecture series. In 1958, she initiated the publication of the Astronomisches Jahrbuch (Astronomical Yearbook), which ran until 1962.

Wähnl retired in 1969. She died on 28 December 1989 in Vienna, Austria.
