= Rudolf Wlassak =

Austrian physiologist and neurologist

Rudolf Wlassak (27 March 1865, Brno - 10 March 1930, Vienna) was an Austrian physiologist and neurologist. He was a pioneer in the hospital treatment of alcoholism.

He was born in Brno, Austrian Empire (now Czech Republic). He studied medicine at the University of Leipzig, and in 1893 qualified as a lecturer in Zürich. After time spent in Rome and Florence, he started a neurological practice in Vienna Neustadt (1919), and worked with Emil Redlich at the Maria-Theresien-Schlössel Hospital in Vienna. In 1922 he became director of a sanatorium for alcoholics called "Am Steinhof".

He conducted research on the structure of cerebellum and on the physiology of the senses and spatial perception.

He was active in the treatment of alcoholics in Vienna, and more widely in Europe. He is remembered for his contributions towards the workers' temperance movement. In 1897 he published "Gegen den Alkohol" and his "Grundriss der Alkoholfrage" was published in 1922. From 1902 onward, he was editor of the journal "Der Abstinent". In 1907 his treatise, The influence of alcohol upon the functions of the brain, was published in English.

He died in Vienna.
