= Wienerwaldsee =

Austrian reservoir

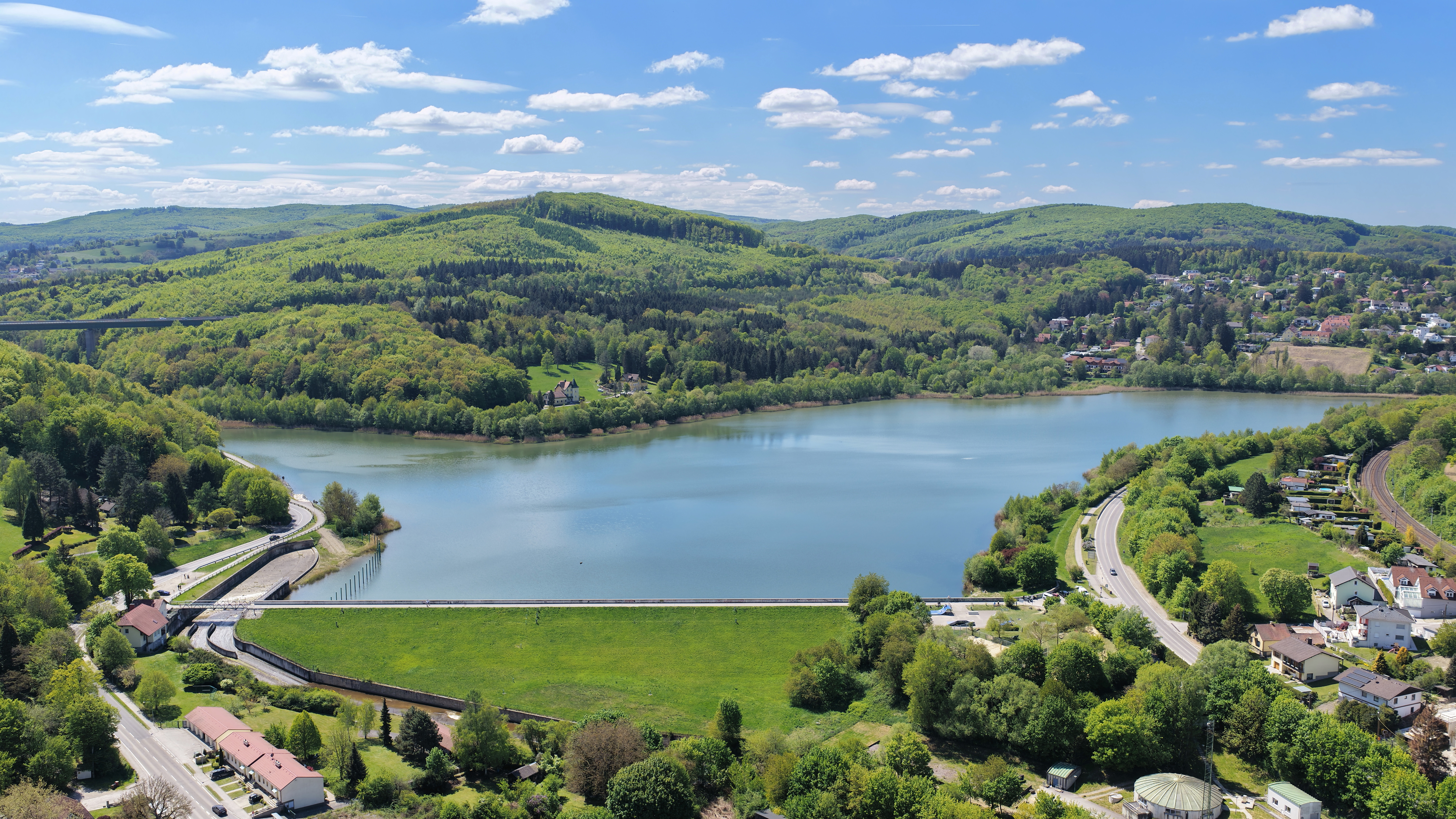
- Northeast view over the reservoir

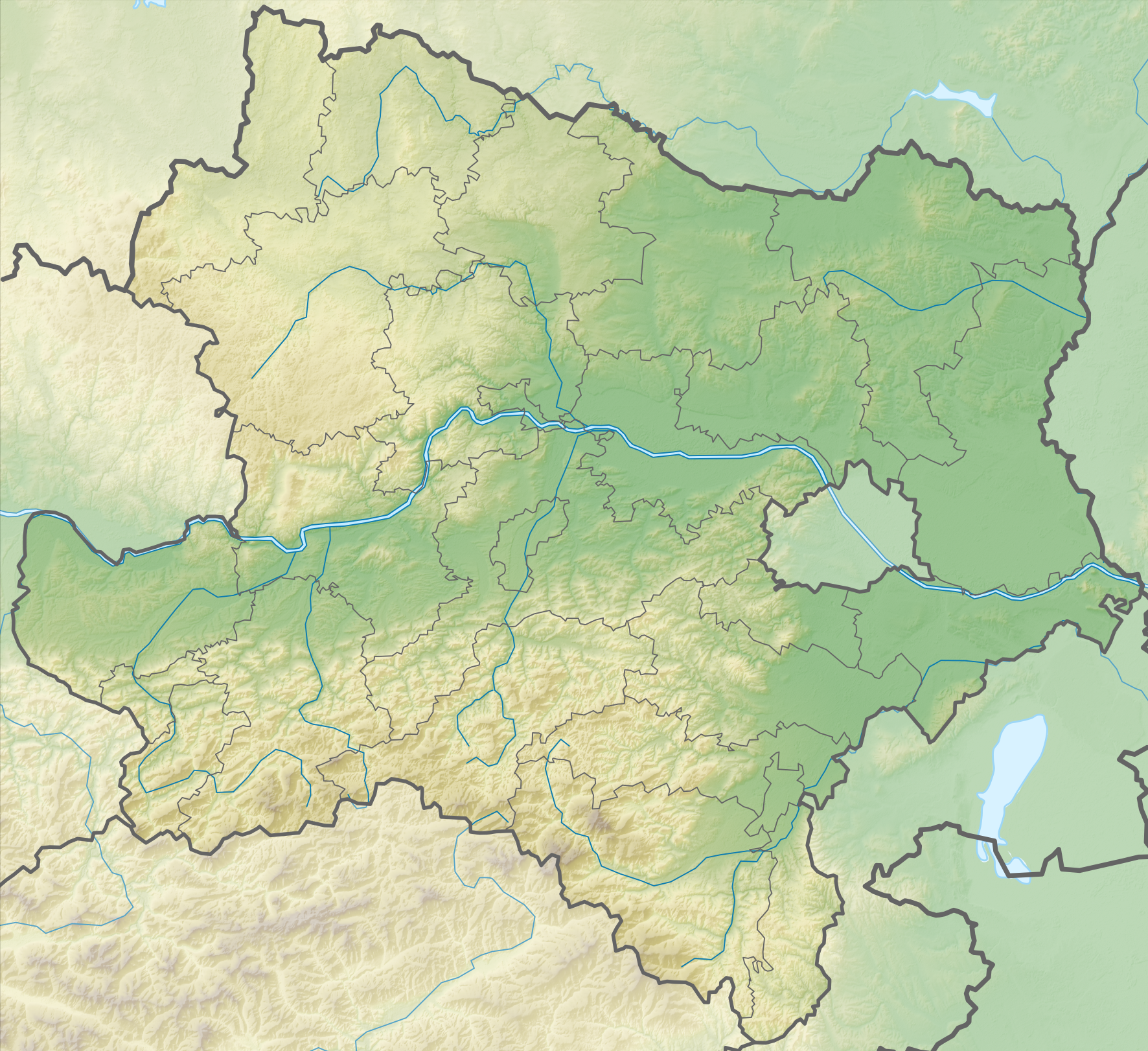
- Location within Lower Austria
- Coordinates: 48°10′50″N 16°7′13″E
- Primary inflows: The Wien, Wolfsgrabenbach
- Primary outflows: The Wien
- Basin countries: Austria
- Max. length: 1.4 km (0.87 mi)
- Max. width: 0.8 km (0.50 mi)
- Surface area: 0.32 km^{2} (0.12 sq mi)
- Surface elevation: 298 m (978 ft)

The Wienerwaldsee (English:Vienna Forest Lake) is a shallow reservoir, located 20 kilometres west of Vienna, Austria.

It is located just north of Austria's main motorway, the West Autobahn, between Tullnerbach and Neu-Purkersdorf. It was created over three years, 1895–1897, by damming the Wienfluss (The Wien) and letting it fill the valley behind. The area around the lake is a nature conservation area. The area is a water protection zone where activities like swimming and ice skating are prohibited. Accordingly, the Wienerwaldsee has established itself as a habitat for a diverse range of flora and fauna. On the northern shore, near the weir, stands the statue of Wilhelm Kress. He was an early pioneer of seaplanes and during testing one of his prototypes sank without trace after hitting debris on the surface. The long distance Westbahn (Western Railway) runs along the northern shore of the lake.

== Gallery ==
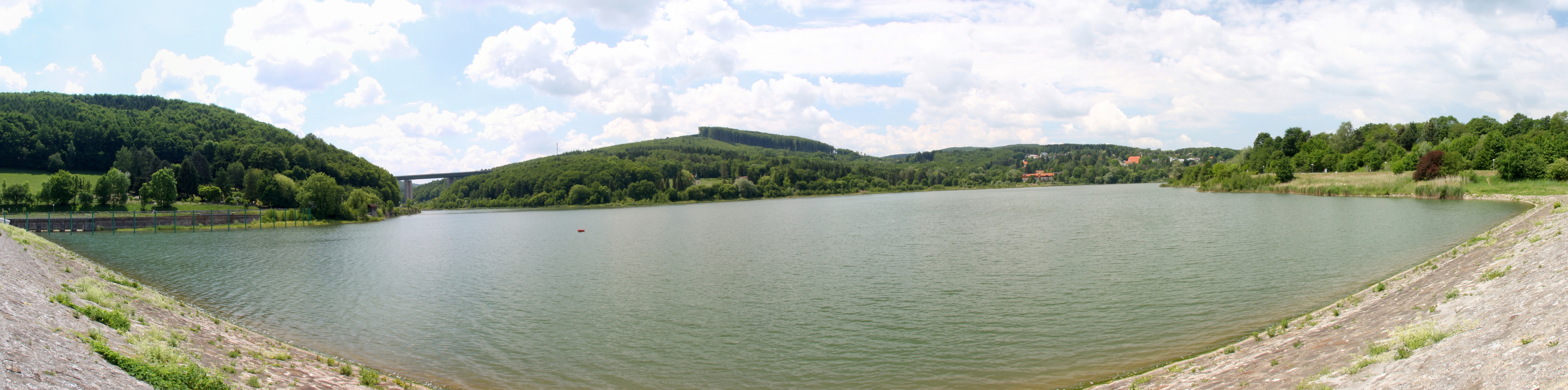
Panorama of the Wienerwaldsees; seen from the North-East bank
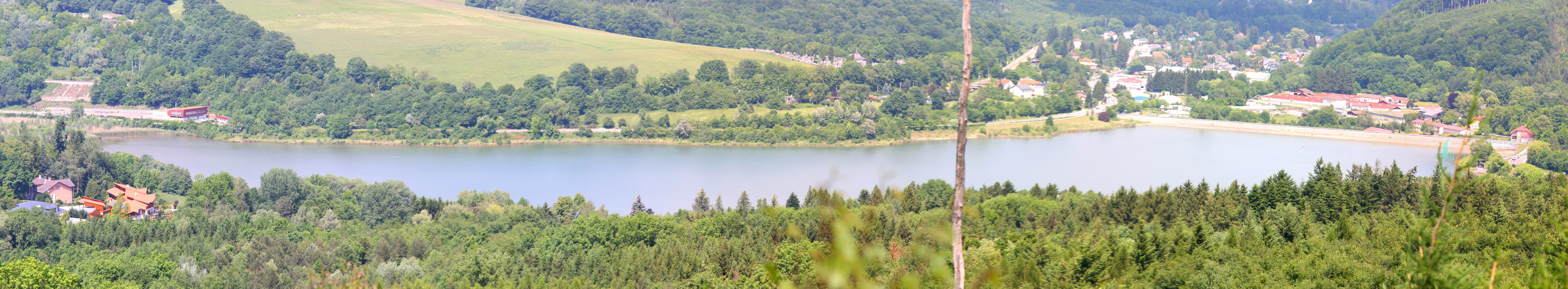
Panorama of the Wienerwaldsees; seen from the Beerwart
