= Statzendorf =

- Municipality
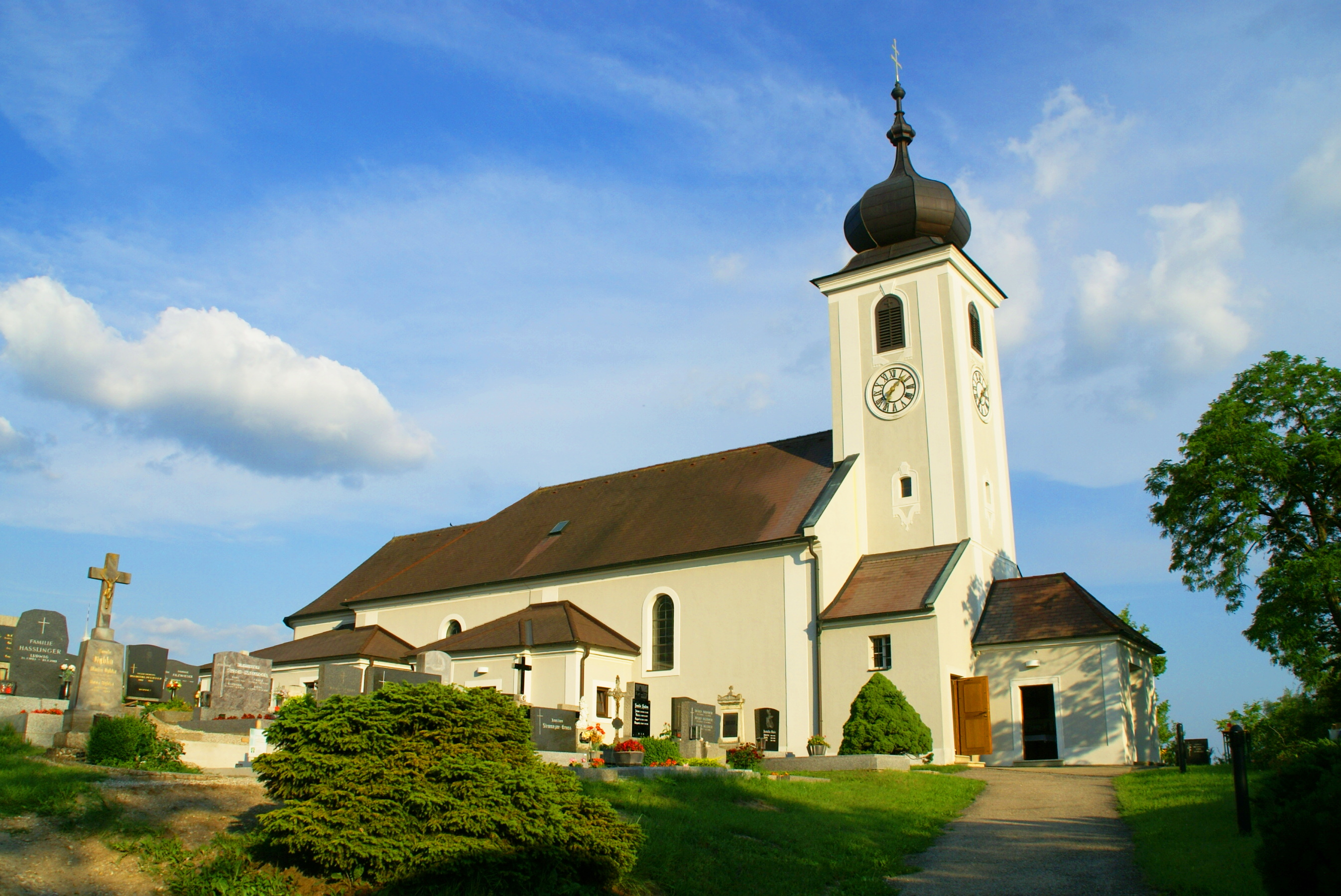
- Statzendorf parish church

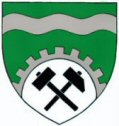
- Coat of arms

- Location within Austria
- Coordinates: 48°18′29″N 15°38′27″E
- Country: Austria
- State: Lower Austria
- District: Sankt Pölten-Land

Government
  - Mayor: Gerhard Reithmayr (SPÖ)

Area
  - Total: 12.46 km^{2} (4.81 sq mi)
- Elevation: 295 m (968 ft)

Population (2018-01-01)
  - Total: 1,362
  - Density: 109.3/km^{2} (283.1/sq mi)
- Time zone: UTC+1 (CET)
  - Summer (DST): UTC+2 (CEST)
- Postal code: 3125
- Area code: 02786
- Vehicle registration: PL
- Website: www.statzendorf.at

Statzendorf is a municipality in the district of Sankt Pölten-Land in Lower Austria, Austria. It consists of the following towns:

- Absdorf (1,17 km²)
- Kuffern (5,07 km²)
- Rottersdorf (2,70 km²)
- Statzendorf (2,91 km²)
- Weidling (0,61 km²)

== Population ==
Historical population
Year	Pop.	±%
1951	1,012	—
1961	115	−88.6%
1971	1,188	+933.0%
1981	1,219	+2.6%
1991	1,247	+2.3%
2001	1,420	+13.9%
2012	1,367	−3.7%
