= Wilhelm Kress =

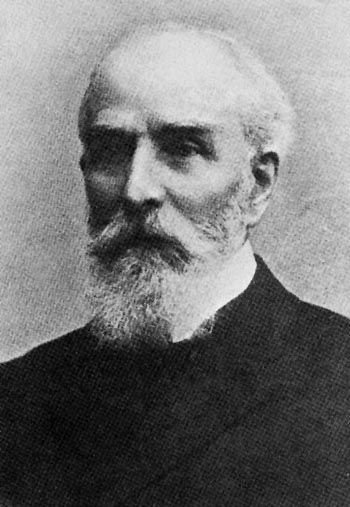
Wilhelm Kress

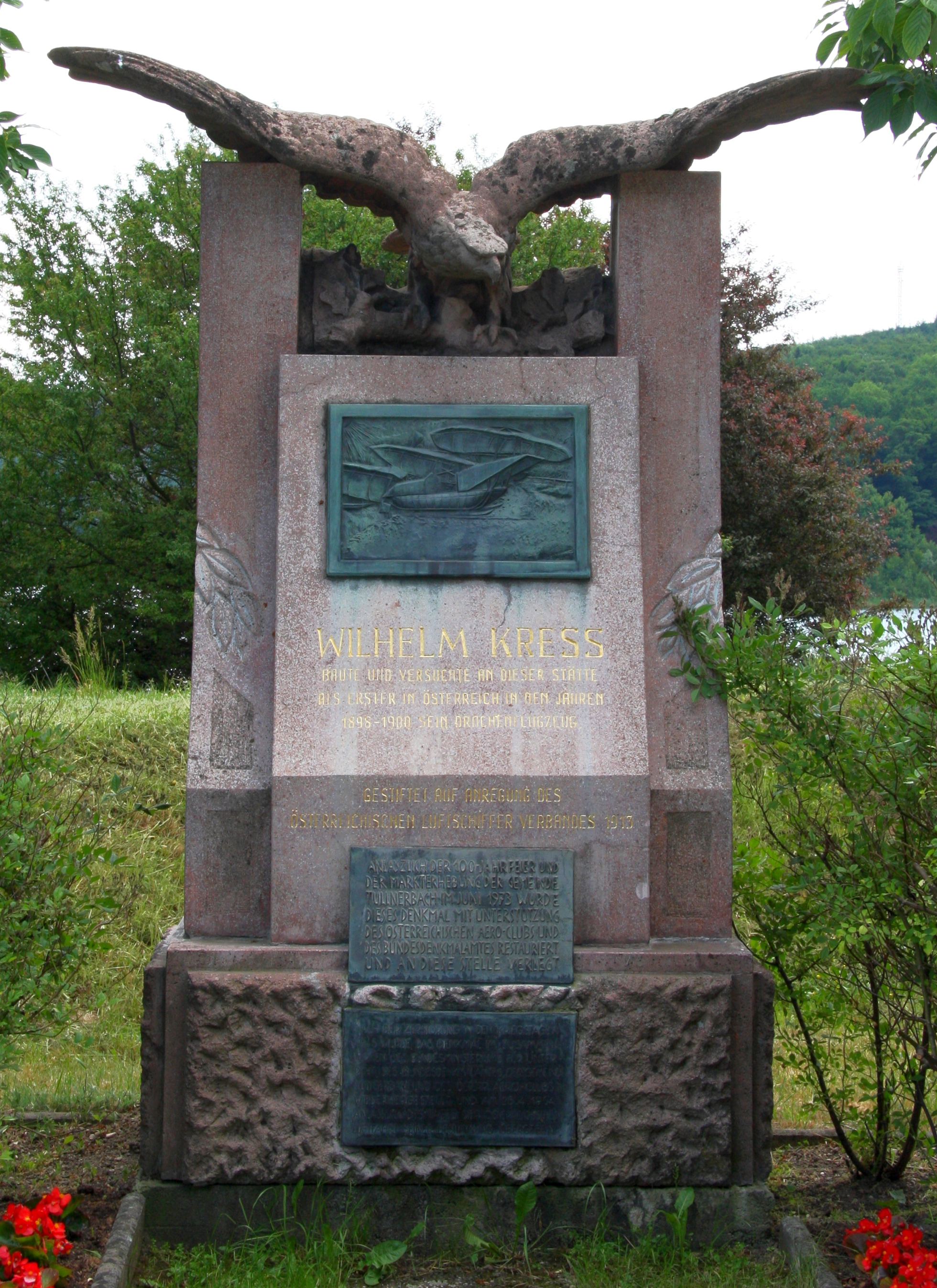
The Wilhelm Kress monument near the Wienerwaldsee

Wilhelm Kress (29 July 1836 in Saint Petersburg – 24 February 1913 in Vienna) Born of German (Bavarian) parents in St. Petersburg in 1836. Moved to Vienna in 1873, where his self-propelled flying models attracted much attention. He became a naturalized Austrian.

== Life ==
Kress came to Vienna in 1873, where he developed the first modern delta-flying hang glider in 1877. This hang-glider was a major achievement for the time, when many engineers still struggled with the development of "heavier-than-air" non-powered aircraft. He also displayed rubber band powered flying models called the 'Aeroveloce' in 1877 and 1880.

During the turn of the century he was one of the world-wide contestants for the creation of a break-through powered airplane. In 1900 he developed the control stick for aircraft, but did not apply for a patent (instead, a patent was awarded to the French aviator, Robert Esnault-Pelterie who applied for it in 1907). Kress' aircraft, the Drachenflieger, was constructed for water takeoff and achieved some brief hops in 1901 at the Wienerwaldsee near Vienna.

A longer controlled flight was not possible because the engine (made by Daimler) was twice as heavy as Kress had specified in his order, and could be operated only at half of its nominal power output. During one of his attempts at flight taking off from water, his plane was destroyed when it became entangled on debris floating in the lake.

== See also ==
- Wright brothers
- Aviation
- List of Austrian scientists
- List of Austrians
