= Karl Schlögl =

Austrian chemist (1924–2007)

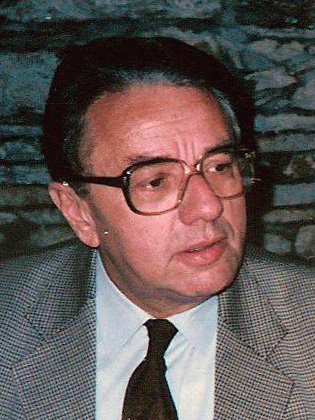
- Karl Schlögl
- Born: October 5, 1924; Vienna, Austria
- Died: May 4, 2007 (aged 82); Vienna, Austria
- Occupation: Professor of organic chemistry
- Spouse: Rosmarie Schlögl

Karl Schlögl (October 5, 1924 – May 4, 2007) was an Austrian chemist. He was professor of organic chemistry at the University of Vienna and secretary as well as vice-president of the Austrian Academy of Sciences.

== Biography ==
Schlögl was born October 5, 1924, in Vienna. Schlögl's first contact with organic chemistry happened during his middle-school education, when his father - the principal and teacher for natural sciences - took young Karl to school after hours to do experiments together. Schlögl graduated from high-school in 1943 and was declared unfit for service by the Wehrmacht due to his asthma. He started studying chemistry at the University of Vienna under Ernst Späth, where he completed his dissertation in 1950.

From 1954 to 1955 Schlögl began working on ferrocenes at the University of Manchester during a British council scholarship. After his return to the University of Vienna he achieved the habilitation for organic chemistry in 1959.

In 1970 Schlögl was promoted to associate professor and in 1971 to full professor for organic chemistry.

Since 1974 he was director, and since 1978 chairman of the Institute of Organic Chemistry at the University of Vienna. From 1977 through 1979 he was the first elected Dean of the Faculty of Formal and Natural Sciences at the University of Vienna.

The Austrian Academy of Sciences elected Schlögl as a corresponding member in 1978 and as a full member in 1982. From 1991 to 1995 Schlögl was general secretary of the academy, and from 1997 to 2000 he was vice-president of the Austrian Academy of Sciences. Furthermore, Schlögl was a corresponding member of the Nordrhein-Westfälische Akademie der Wissenschaften as well as the New York Academy of Sciences.

== Published works ==
Schlögl was one of the pioneers of the research into the geometric structure of organic compounds and the resulting mechanisms of their chemical reactions. He has been very successful with his work on new pharmaceutical substances.

Schlögl authored and co-authored over 200 scientific publications and was an inventor on four patents. He supervised 51 dissertations of his doctoral students.

Schlögl's main field of research since about 1963 was stereochemistry, and in 1970 he began to shift his focus specifically on the chirality of organic compounds.

== Awards ==
Schlögl received numerous scientific awards for his work, including the Erwin Schrödinger Prize of the Austrian Academy of Sciences in 1985, the prize for natural sciences of the city of Vienna in 1989, and the Wilhelm Exner Medal of the Austrian Economic Association in 1991.

== See also ==
- Organic chemistry
- University of Vienna
- Austrian Academy of Sciences
