= Helmut-List-Halle =

Events venue in Graz, Austria

Helmut List Halle
- Helmut-List-Halle
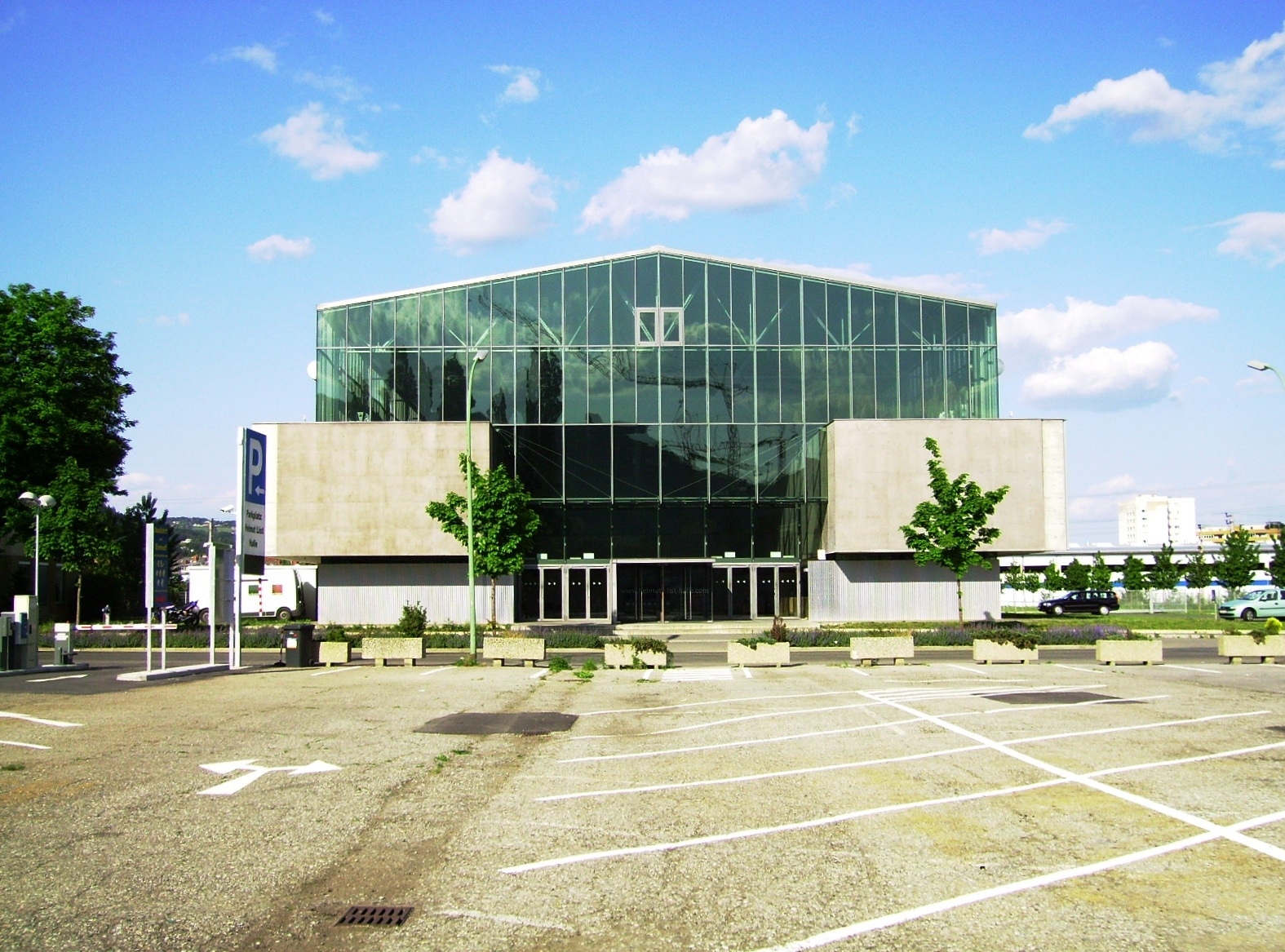
- Helmut-List-Halle
- Interactive map of Helmut List Halle
- Address: 98a Waagner-Biro-Straße; Graz; Austria
- Coordinates: 47.0795°N 15.4115°E
- Capacity: Foyer only: 1,200; Main hall & foyer: 1,800–2,000; Hall, foyer & backstage: up to 2,400

Construction
- Opened: 9 January 2003
- Expanded: 2023 (with Halle D "Club Detroit")
- Architect: Markus Pernthaler

Website
- http://www.helmut-list-halle.com/

The Helmut-List-Halle (or, more commonly in English, Helmut List Halle) is a multi-purpose event and concert hall in Graz, Austria. Housed in a former 1950s industrial building originally erected for AVL List, it was adaptively remodelled in 2003 by architect Markus Pernthaler to provide adequate acoustics and accommodate up to 2,400 spectators. The complex comprises a foyer, main hall and backstage area, and features a 370 m² façade-integrated photovoltaic installation commissioned in January 2003. In 2023 an underground extension, Club Detroit, was added beneath the venue’s parking garage.

== History ==
=== Predecessor industrial hall ===
In 1899 a bridge-building and forge company located on the site was purchased by the Vienna-based forge Waagner, which in 1905 merged with the Hirschstetten firm J. Biró & A. Kurz. The 2002 conversion was carried out within the plain, prismatic Werkshalle IX built from riveted steel sections and glass for Waagner-Biro AG, which had meanwhile withdrawn from its Graz operations. The company name Waagner-Biro, written without an accent on the "o" and in use since 1924, survives in the street that runs in front of the hall.

The mobile telescopic stands were supplied by Waagner-Biro Stage Systems (Waagner-Biro Austria Stage Systems AG), bringing Waagner-Biro’s stage-engineering expertise back to the venue.

=== Helmut-List-Halle ===
Named after Helmut List, the hall was originally a dilapidated factory building of AVL List until 2002, after which it was remodelled. Following four months of planning and ten months of construction, the Helmut-List-Halle was inaugurated on 9 January 2003 with the staged première of Begehren by Beat Furrer, simultaneously opening the Graz 2003 European Capital of Culture.

A further motive for the conversion was that Graz lacked a large concert hall of international standard, something required for events such as Styriarte and the Steirischer Herbst festival. The new hall, offering high-quality acoustics and ample capacity, filled this gap.

The complex consists of three sections: foyer, main hall and backstage area. The foyer is almost 36 m long, 14 m wide and 14 m high, yielding about 550 m² of floor space. The main hall measures just under 45 m in length, roughly 23 m in width and 12 m in height, for about 1,100 m². The backstage area is nearly 28 m long and 15 m wide, with a floor area of roughly 350 m². Taken together, the entire complex is 113 m long, 34 m wide and 15 m high.

In 2023 the Helmut-List-Halle was enlarged by Hall D, branded Club Detroit. The addition cost about €22 million, and is located beneath the venue’s parking garage where it is not externally visible.

Following the 2025 Graz school shooting, the Helmut-List-Halle was used as a triage center by local emergency services.

== Construction ==
The brief called for a moderate, sustainable conversion of the 1950s industrial hall, fostering social development in the surrounding district and providing a concert venue of exceptionally high acoustic quality. Architect Markus Pernthaler employed glass, concrete, steel and wood in the redesign.

From the west elevation, at the entrance and across the roof of the large foyer, substantial portions of the original transparent industrial structure remain visible, newly glazed.

The central concert hall is built from solid timber and steel; its ceiling is a glued-laminated timber structure configured so that resonance and damping, together with upholstered seating, ensure desired acoustic quality. Exterior walls and floors each comprise multiple layers to insulate effectively against airborne and structure-borne noise from the adjacent Graz Hauptbahnhof and to prevent sound leakage. A double-door system separates exterior and interior spaces, corridors terminate at acute angles to absorb sound, and soft-closing door mechanisms minimise disturbance, enabling high-quality audio recording.

On the south side, a photovoltaic-clad technical block projects from the building, with a car park in front to guarantee solar exposure; the cooler north side houses catering facilities. The backstage tract to the east, fitted with a large door to the outside, accommodates building services and a studio for audio and live recording. Seminar and changing rooms occupy the upper floor.

=== Photovoltaics ===
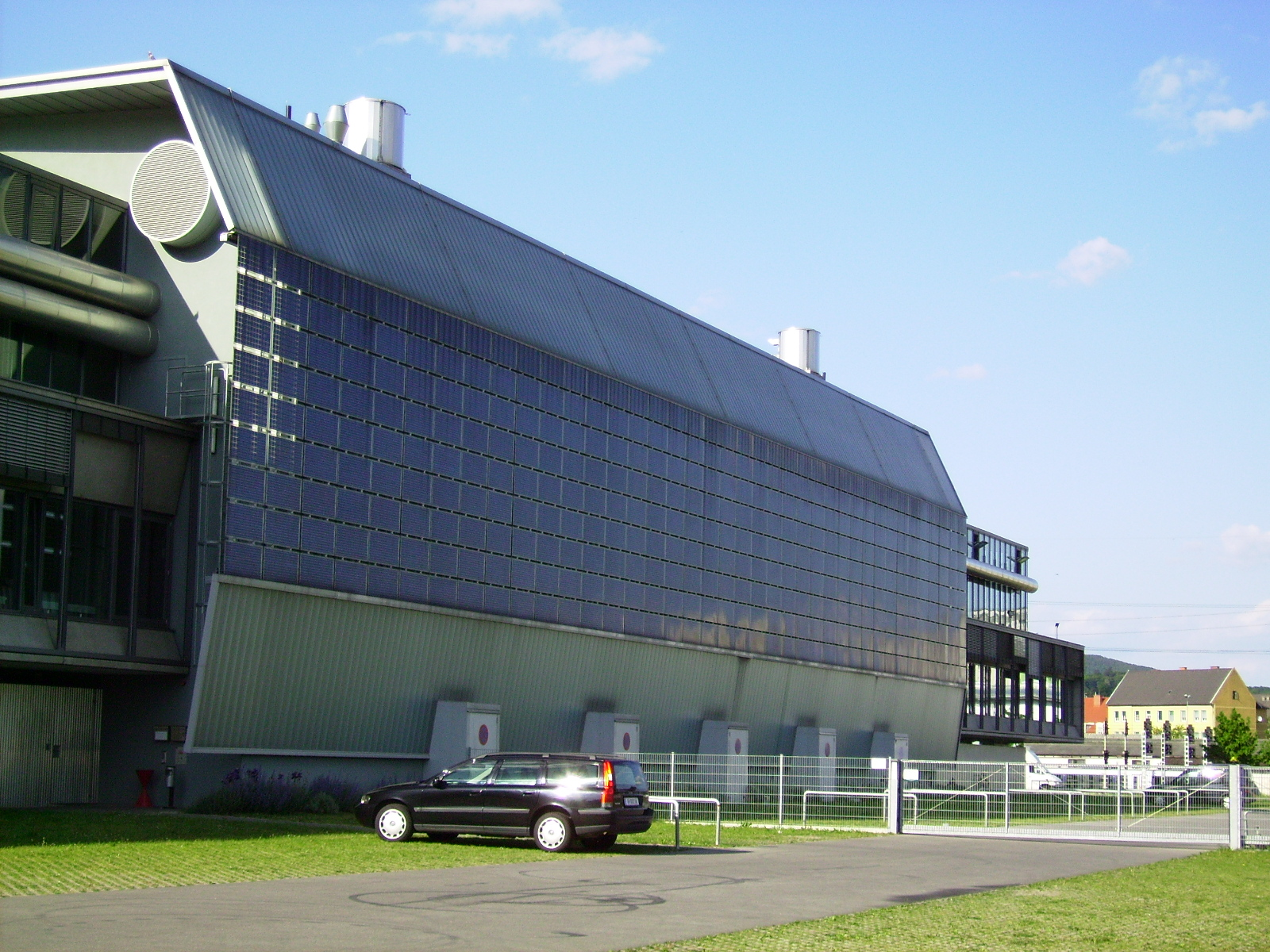
Photovoltaic panels on the south façade

On the south façade, 350 translucent solar modules covering 370 m² provide a peak output of 35 kWp and form a vertical design feature. At the time of commissioning in January 2003, the array was one of Austria’s largest façade-integrated photovoltaic installations and received a Solarpreis (solar prize) in 2004. The system was installed and is operated by Stadtwerke Hartberg through two subsidiaries. Of the total project cost of €216,000, €96,000 was financed under a contracting model by Ökoplan, which operates and monitors the plant at its own risk; a further €120,000 in subsidies was provided via the EU Urban II initiative (2000–2008) for the development of urban areas in need of action, channelled through the City of Graz’s "Urban_Link Graz-West" program and the State of Styria.

The array feeds roughly 26,000 kWh of electricity into the public grid each year.
