= Ernst Fiala =

Ernst Fiala may refer to:

- Ernst Fiala (engineer) (born 1928), Austrian automotive engineer
- Ernst Fiala (footballer) (1940–2006), Austrian footballer
