= Wilhelm Exner Medal =

Award by Wilhelm Exner Fund, founded by Austrian Industry Association

The Wilhelm Exner Medal has been awarded by the Austrian Industry Association, Österreichischer Gewerbeverein (ÖGV), for excellence in research and science since 1921.

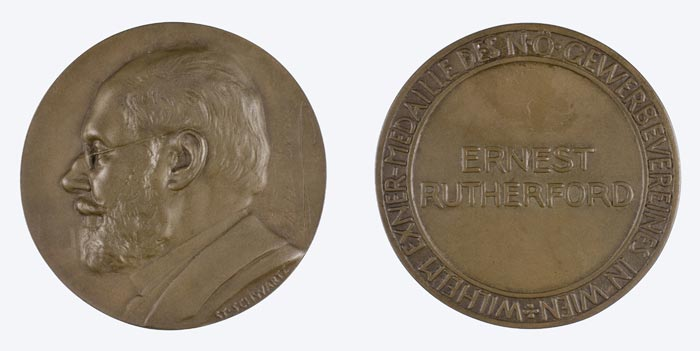
Wilhelm Exner Medal

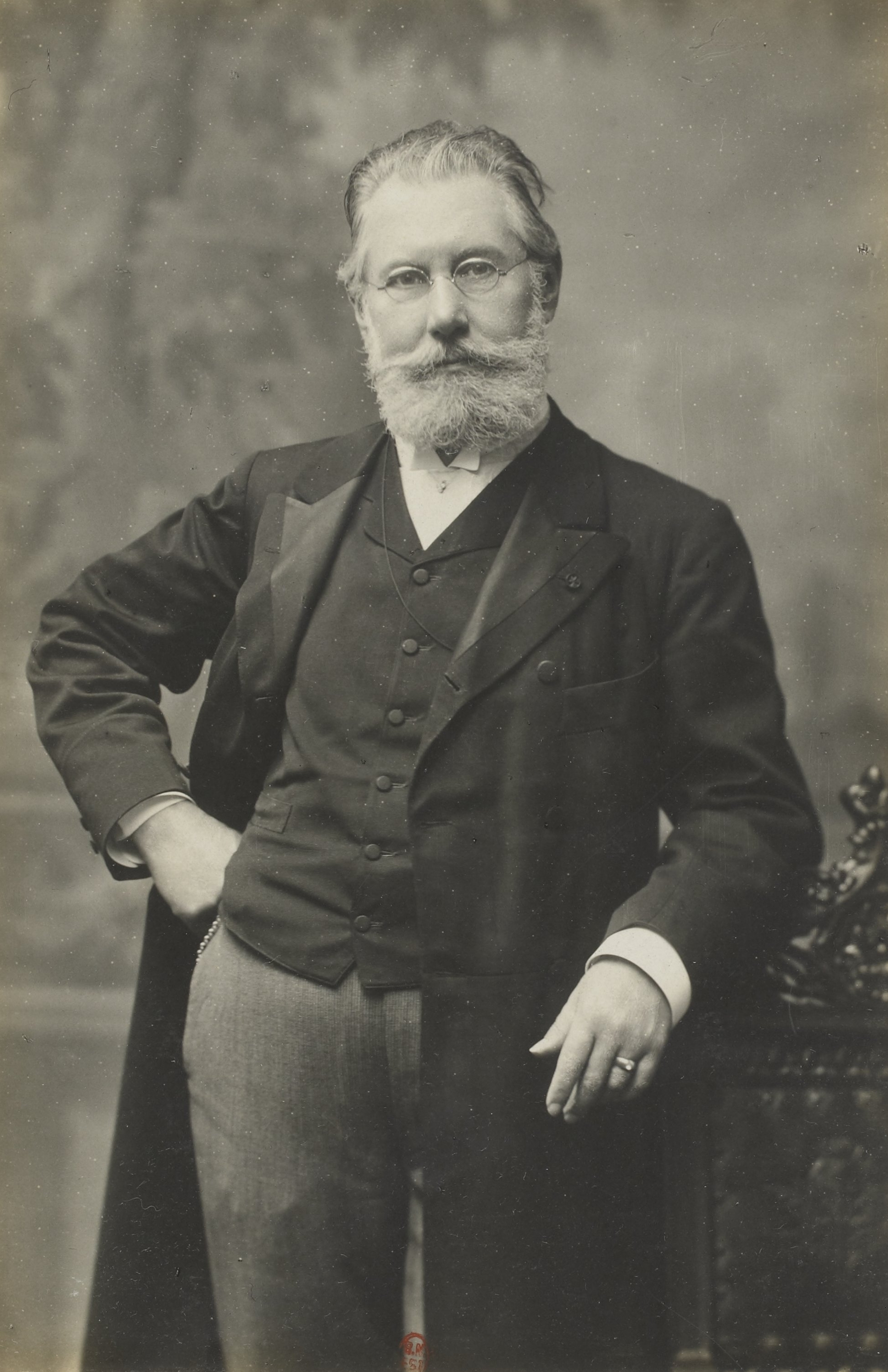
Wilhelm Exner

The medal is dedicated to Wilhelm Exner (1840–1931), former president of the Association, who initialized the chamber of commerce in Austria, the Vienna Technical Museum and the World Exhibition in Vienna. According to Wilhelm Exner the combination of science and economy formed the groundwork for economical growth and wealth. Wilhelm Exner considered the radical changes in the economic and social framework of the 20th century to be an opportunity and aimed to tackle the issues arising offensively and constructively. He represented the cosmopolitan Austrian liberalism with a commitment to modernization and transformation of the economy, science and society. Throughout his career, he has taken a variety of key initiatives and has been involved by helping economy and business.

The Wilhelm Exner Medal is awarded to scientists and researchers that have had a direct impact on business and industry through their scientific achievements and contributions. The award was created to honor the 60th anniversary of Wilhelm Exner's association with ÖGV. The selection of the scientist to be honored takes place at the suggestion and consultation of the former medalists and is confirmed by the board of the Wilhelm Exner Foundation and by the board of the Austrian Entrepreneur´s Association.

Since the Wilhelm Exner Medal was established, over 230 inventors, researchers and scientists have been honored, including 21 Nobel Prize awardees.

== The medal ==
The medal has a diameter of 7.5 cm and is made of bronze. It bears on the front of the picture and the signature Wilhelm Exner, on the back the inscription: "Wilhelm Exner Medal of the Austrian Trade Association in Vienna"; the name of the individual to which the medal was awarded; and the year of the award.

== Wilhelm Exner Lectures ==
In order to honor the new Wilhelm Exner Medalists, the Exner Lectures offer a symposium where the awarded scientists present their current topics of research. The lectures complement the festive ceremony of the medal and offer an opportunity to bring the economic and scientific communities together. Each year, the Association sends out a signal that the cooperative interaction between researchers and entrepreneurs is the basis for prosperity and growth.

== Recipients ==
Source: Wilhelm Exner Medal Foundation

=== 2020s ===
- Sepp Hochreiter, 2025
- Ferdi Schüth, 2024
- Giulio Superti-Furga, 2024
- Omar M. Yaghi, 2023
- Daniel G. Anderson, 2023
- Thuc Quyen Nguyen, 2023
- Katalin Karikó and Luisa Torsi (jointly), 2021
- Edward Boyden, 2020

=== 2010s ===
- Joseph M. DeSimone, 2019
- Gregor Weihs, 2018
- Thomas Jennewein, 2018
- Zhenan Bao, 2018
- A. Paul Alivisatos, 2018
- Fabiola Gianotti, 2017
- Chad Mirkin, 2017
- Emmanuelle Charpentier, 2016
- Gero Miesenböck, 2016
- Stefan Hell, 2016
- Johann Eibl, 2016
- Sir Gregory Winter, 2015
- Thomas J.R. Hughes, 2014
- Joseph M. Jacobson, 2013
- Heinz Redl, 2013
- Ted Hänsch, 2012
- Robert Langer, 2012
- Friedrich Prinz, 2012
- Michael Grätzel, 2011
- Manfred Eigen, 2011
- Bertil Andersson, 2010
- Ada Yonath, 2010

=== 2000s ===
- Sir Alan Fersht, 2009
- Christian Wandrey, 2009
- Zdenek Bazant, 2008
- Wolfgang Knoll, 2008
- Wolfgang L. Zagler, 2007
- Peter Palese, 2007
- Shuguang Zhang, 2006
- Hannes Bardach, 2006
- Jan Egbert de Vries, 2005
- Hermann Kopetz, 2005
- Anton Zeilinger, 2005
- Meir Wilchek, 2004
- Andreas Ullrich, 2004
- Helmut List, 2003
- Hans Sünkel, 2003
- Dietrich Kraft, 2003
- Hermann Katinger, 2002
- Ferdinand Piëch, 2002
- Andreas Plückthun, 2002
- Georg Brasseur, 2001
- Friedrich Dorner, 2001
- Artur Doppelmayr, 2001
- Rudolf Rigler, 2000
- Heinz Saedler, 2000
- Heinz Brandl, 2000

=== 1990s ===
- Peter Schuster, 1999
- Henry Baltes, 1999
- Gottfried Konecny, 1999
- Uwe B. Sleytr, 1998
- Heinz W. Engl, 1998
- Heiner Ryssel, 1998
- Klaus Pinkau, 1997
- Hans A. Leopold, 1997
- Charles Weissmann, 1997
- Ingeborg Hochmair-Desoyer, 1996
- Herbert Mang, 1996
- Heinrich Klaus Peter Ursprung, 1996
- Bengt Gustaf Rånby, 1996
- Jozef Stefaan Schell, 1995
- Gottfried Biegelmeier, 1995
- Bruno Buchberger, 1995
- Siegfried Selberherr, 1994
- Max L. Birnstiel, 1994
- Josef Singer, 1994
- Hellmut Fischmeister, 1993
- Hans Junek, 1993
- Aladar Szalay, 1993
- Willibald Riedler, 1992
- Peter Komarek, 1992
- Karl Hermann Spitzy, 1992
- Michael J. Higatsberger, 1991
- Karl Schlögl, 1991
- Herwig Schopper, 1991
- Takeo Saegusa, 1990
- Karl Kraus, 1990
- Gernot Zippe, 1990

=== 1980s ===
- Hubert Bildstein, 1988
- Helmut Zahn, 1988
- Gyözö Kovács, 1988
- Reimar Lüst, 1987
- Otto Vogl, 1987
- Karl Alexander Müller, 1987
- Viktor Gutmann (chemist), 1986
- Horst Dieter Wahl, 1986
- Gerhard Dorda, 1986
- Helmut Rauch, 1985
- Heinz Maier-Leibnitz, 1985
- Ernst Fiala, 1985
- Karl Rinner, 1984
- Egon Schubert, 1984
- Adolf Birkhofer, 1984
- Walter Heywang, 1983
- Kurt Magnus, 1983
- Ernst Brandl, 1983
- Sir Stanley Hooker, 1982
- Hendrik Brugt Gerhard Casimir, 1982
- Edmund Hlawka, 1982
- Josef Schurz, 1981
- Anton Pischinger, 1981
- Adriaan van Wijngaarden, 1981
- Willem Johan Kolff, 1980
- Otto Hittmair, 1980
- Günther Wilke, 1980
- Ernst Fehrer, 1980

=== 1970s ===
- Winfried Oppelt, 1979
- Ferry Porsche, 1979
- Christian Veder, 1979
- Alfred Kastler, 1979
- Max Auwärter, 1978
- Hans Tuppy, 1978
- Friedrich Ludwig Bauer, 1978
- Viktor Hauk, 1977
- Hans Scherenberg, 1977
- Fritz Paschke, 1977
- Erwin Plöckinger, 1977
- Theodor Wasserrab, 1976
- Ferdinand Steinhauser, 1976
- Ferdinand Beran, 1976
- Ladislaus von Rabcewicz, 1975
- Klaus Oswatitsch, 1975
- Herbert Döring, 1975
- August F. Witt, 1975
- Sir Godfrey Newbold Hounsfield, 1974
- Siegfried J. Meurer, 1974
- Roland Mitsche, 1974
- Peter Klaudy, 1974
- Richard Kieffer, 1973
- Otto Kraupp, 1973
- Otto Hromatka, 1973
- Guido Peter Pirquet, 1973
- Bruno Kralowetz, 1973
- Heinz Zemanek, 1972
- Eberhard Spenke, 1972
- Willibald Jentschke, 1971
- Karl Ziegler, 1971
- Hans List, 1971
- Sir Alastair Pilkington, 1970
- Otto Kratky, 1970
- Herbert Trenkler, 1970
- Charles Hard Townes, 1970

=== 1960s ===
- Wolfgang Gröbner, 1969
- Wernher von Braun, 1969
- Philip Weiss, 1969
- Konrad Zuse, 1969
- Hermann Oberth, 1969
- Hans Nowotny, 1969
- Richard Kwizda, 1968
- Leopold Küchler, 1968
- Adolf Leonhard, 1968
- Sir William Penney, 1967
- Max Ferdinand Perutz, 1967
- Karl V. Kordesch, 1967
- Sir Henry Charles Husband, 1966
- Fritz Wessely, 1966
- Fritz Stüssi, 1966
- Fritz Regler, 1965
- Adolf Slattenschek, 1965
- Adolf Pucher, 1965
- William Shockley, 1963
- Philip Sporn, 1963
- Eduard Justi, 1963
- Theodore von Kármán, 1962
- Franz Patat, 1962
- Albert Caquot, 1962
- Sir John Douglas Cockcroft, 1961
- Rudolf Vogel, 1961
- Paul Harteck, 1961
- Sir Howard Walter Florey, 1960
- Lise Meitner, 1960
- Eugène Freyssinet, 1960

=== 1950s ===
- Richard Joseph Neutra, 1959
- Reinhard Straumann, 1959
- Carl Wagner, 1959
- Otto Hahn, 1958
- Sir Alexander Fleck, 1957
- Pier Luigi Nervi, 1957
- Josef Mattauch, 1957
- Fritz Feigl, 1957
- Erika Cremer, 1957
- Erich Schmid, 1957
- Sir Christopher Hinton, 1956
- Johann Arvid Hedvall, 1956
- Heinrich Sequenz, 1956
- Franz Holzinger, 1956
- Paul Schwarzkopf, 1955
- Ferdinand Campus, 1955
- Bernhard Moritz Gerbel, 1955
- Gustav Hüttig, 1954
- Geoffrey Taylor, 1954
- Eduardo Torroja, 1954
- Berta Karlik, 1954
- Karl Girkmann, 1953
- Hans Lieb, 1953
- Richard Johann Kuhn, 1952
- Gustav Adolf Schwaiger, 1952
- Ludwig Prandtl, 1951
- Karl Holey, 1951
- Eduard Heinl, 1951

=== 1940s ===
- Not awarded, due to World War II

=== 1930s ===
- Sir Harold Hartley, 1937
- Friedrich Bergius, 1937
- Ernst Späth, 1937
- Lord Ernest Rutherford of Nelson, 1936
- Franz Joseph Emil Fischer, 1936
- Ferdinand Porsche, 1936
- Wolf Johannes Müller, 1935
- Arne Frederic Westgren, 1935
- Hermann F. Mark, 1934
- Guglielmo Marconi, 1934
- Otto Waldstein, 1932
- Friedrich Ignaz von Emperger, 1932
- Carl Bosch, 1932
- Rudolf Saliger, 1931
- Carl Hochenegg, 1931
- Johannes Ruths, 1930
- Johann Kremenezky, 1930
- Hermann Michel, 1930

=== 1920s ===
- Paul Ludwik, 1929
- Fritz Haber, 1929
- Mirko Gottfried Ros, 1928
- Friedrich Gebers, 1928
- Hugo Junkers, 1927
- Heinrich Mache, 1927
- Michael Hainisch, 1926
- Georg Wilhelm Graf von Arco, 1926. The city of Arco, Idaho is named after him.
- Ernst Krause, machine tools & trade associations, 1926
- Rudolf Halter, 1925
- Carl Julius von Bach, 1924
- Wilhelm Ostwald, 1923
- Rudolf Wegscheider, 1923
- Josef Maria Eder, 1923
- Hubert Engels, 1923
- Alfred Collmann, 1923
- Carl Paul Gottfried von Linde, 1922
- Wilhelm Exner, 1921
- Oskar von Miller, 1921
- Carl Auer von Welsbach, 1921

== See also ==
- List of general science and technology awards
