= Uwe B. Sleytr =

Austrian biologist

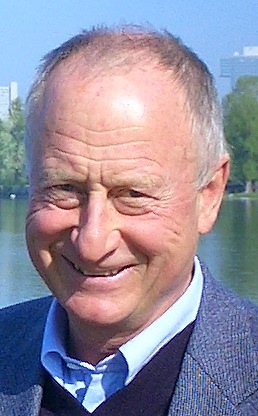
- Born: July 15, 1942 (age 84); Vienna
- Education: University of Natural Resources and Life Sciences, Vienna
- Scientific career
- Fields: Nanobiotechnology, Molecular Biology, biomimetics, synthetic biology
- Workplaces: University of Natural Resources and Life Sciences, Vienna

Uwe B. Sleytr (born July 15, 1942 in Vienna, Austria) is an emeritus professor of microbiology and the former head of the Department of Nanobiotechnology at the University of Natural Resources and Life Sciences, Vienna. He is a full member of the Division of Mathematics and Natural Sciences of the Austrian Academy of Sciences and has published approximately 420 scientific papers, 5 books and several patents.

== Biography ==
Sleytr studied food and biotechnology at the University of Natural Resources and Life Sciences, Vienna, graduating with a PhD (Dr. nat. Techn.) in 1970. He subsequently was senior research scientist at the Medical Research Council Laboratory of Molecular Biology and the Strangeways Research Laboratory in Cambridge with a fellowship from the Medical Research Council. In 1973 he received his habilitation in General Microbiology from the University of Natural Resources and Life Sciences, Vienna. He also served as visiting professor at Temple University in 1977-78. In 1980 he was appointed (ad personam sui generis) head of the Department of Nano-Biotechnology and Ludwig Boltzmann Institute for Molecular Nanotechnology at the University of Natural Resources and Life Sciences, Vienna in 1980. He served in this role until 2010 when he became professor emeritus.

Sleytr has been bestowed honorary professorships by the Shanghai Jiaotong University, Sichuan University and the China University of Petroleum.

== Research ==
Sleytr is an early researcher and pioneer in the field of Nanobiotechnology. He first discovered the S-layer Protein which has found important applications as patterning element and toolkit in nano-biotechnology. Sleytr's work has contributed significantly to the fact that today it is recognized that most bacteria and almost all archaea form S-layers as cell surface structure. In addition, Sleytr deals with the connection and interaction of science and art.

Together with Karin Thorne, he was able to prove in 1976 that S-layers can also consist of glycoproteins, which was the first evidence for the glycosylation of a cell wall protein in bacteria. His investigations of the dynamic self-organization of S-layers on growing and dividing cells and the assembly of isolated S-layer monomers in vitro have shown that S-layers are the simplest isopore protein membranes developed during evolution. These results were also the basis for the production of large S-layer ultrafiltration membranes with strictly defined separation (cut off) limits.

Major fields of application were derived from the fact that S-layer proteins could be fused with other functional proteins (e.g. ligands, antigens, antibodies, enzymes, peptides) and assembled on solid carriers (e.g. metals, semiconductors, graphene, polymers) and lipid membranes including liposomes, emulsomes, nanoparticles and magnetic beads in the form of regular lattices. Due to their unique repetitive physicochemical properties, S-layers could be used in combination with other biomolecules (proteins, lipids, carbohydrates, nucleic acids, etc.) and nanoparticles as patterning elements and basic building blocks for the production of sometimes very complex supramolecular and biomimetic structures. This also opened up a wide range of applications for S-layers in synthetic biology, biomimetics, nanotechnology, nanomedicine and bio-inspired materials.

== Contributions to Nanobiotechnology ==
Sleytr has had a significant impact on the international scientific community in nanobiotechnology. He is widely recognized for his pioneering research involving crystalline bacterial cell surface layers (S-layers), which has influenced multiple fields, including nanomaterials, biomimetics, vaccine development and biosensors.

His research has been cited globally, impacting both academic research and industrial applications. • He has received numerous awards and honors for his contributions to nanobiotechnology. Overall, Uwe Sleytr's work has been foundational in advancing bionanotechnology and continues to inspire research into functional nanostructures

• Sleytr UB, Pum D. S-layers: from a serendipitous discovery to a toolkit for nanobiotechnology. Quarterly Reviews of Biophysics . 2025 Jan 17;58:e4. https://doi.org/10.1017/S0033583524000106, https://pubmed.ncbi.nlm.nih.gov/39819733/

• Sleytr UB: Curiosity and Passion for Science and Art –“S-layer Proteins of Bacteria and Archaea” Series in Structural Biology, World Scientific (2016) Vol 7. ISBN 9789813141810 or ISBN 9813141816

== Cryopreparation Techniques for Transmission Electron Microscopy ==
Uwe Sleytr was engaged in the improvement of electron microscope preparation techniques for biological specimens with special emphasis on freeze-etching (freeze-fracture) for transmission electron microscopy. This method allowed the evaluation of structures of complementary fracture faces produced at temperatures down to 4 Kelvin for the first time. With the help of these methods it was possible to prove that cell membrane brake along the central plane of the lipid bilayer, supporting the fluid mosaic model postulated for cell membranes, and that plastic deformation of polymers even occur during fracturing at 4K.

• Robards, A.W., and U.B. Sleytr. Low temperature Methods in Biological Electron Microscopy (1985) Elsevier Science. ISBN 9780444806840

== Artistic Activities ==
In addition to his scientific endeavors, Sleytr has engaged in artistic pursuits that visualize the possibilities of synthetic biology in relation to human evolution. His artistic activities are intended to make people aware that although fossile records and molecular biology data allow for reconstructing evolutionary pathways leading to current life forms including humans, predicting future developments remain elusive. His mask-like sculptures thematise the ability of humans to intervene in evolution through genetic manipulation and encourage reflection on the future development of life. In his numerous exhibitions he presents works that shed light on the tension between humanity and the global future. His sculptures invite us to reflect on the role of humans as “homo creator” and encourage the imagination in the transfer of knowledge.

• Sleytr UB: Curiosity and Passion for Science and Art –“S-layer Proteins of Bacteria and Archaea” Series in Structural Biology, World Scientific (2016) Vol 7. ISBN 9789813141810 or ISBN 9813141816

• http://art-and-science.eu

== Selected Awards and Fellowships ==
- Honorary Professorships at Shanghai Jiao Tong University, Shanghai, China (2013),
- Sichuan University, Chengdu, China (2006),
- China University of Petroleum, Qingdao, China (2010)
- Fellow of the American Institute for Medical and Biological Engineering, USA (2012)
- Member of the European Academy of Sciences and Arts (2008)
- Wilhelm Exner Medal (1998)
- Science Award of the City of Vienna (1998)
- Philip Morris Research Award (1998) (with M. Sara)
- Member of the Austrian Academy of Sciences (1994)
- Innitzer Award(1989)
- EUREKA Award (1988)
- Sandoz-Novartis Award (1971)
- Schwackhöfer-Award (1970)

== Selected publications ==
- Sleytr UB (1975) Heterologous reattachment of regular arrays of glycoproteins on bacterial surfaces. Nature 257(5525), 400–402. https://doi.org/10.1038/257400a0, https://pubmed.ncbi.nlm.nih.gov/241021/
- Sleytr UB and Thorne KJI (1976) Chemical characterization of the regularly arrayed surface layersof Clostridium thermosaccharolyticum and Clostridium thermohydrosulfuricum. Journal of Bacteriology 126, 377–383. https://doi.org/10.1128/jb.126.1.377-383.1976, https://pubmed.ncbi.nlm.nih.gov/816775/
- U. B. Sleytr, A. W. Robards: Plastic deformation during freeze-cleavage: a review. In: J. Microsc. Band 110, 1977, S. 1–25. https://doi.org/10.1111/j.1365-2818.1977.tb00009.x
- U. B. Sleytr, A. W. Robards: Freeze-fracturing: a review of methods and results. In: J. Microsc. Band 111, 1977, S. 77–100. https://doi.org/10.1111/j.1365-2818.1977.tb00049.x
- Sleytr UB (1978) Regular arrays of macromolecules on bacterial cell walls: Structure, chemistry, assembly, and function. International Review of Cytology 53, 1–62. https://doi.org/10.1016/s0074-7696(08)62240-8, https://pubmed.ncbi.nlm.nih.gov/352979/
- Sleytr UB and Sára M (1986) Ultrafiltration membranes with uniform pores from crystalline bacterial-cell envelope layers. Applied Microbiology and Biotechnology 25(2), 83–90. https://doi.org/10.1007/BF00938929
- Sleytr UB, Messner P, Pum D and Sara M (1999) Crystalline bacterial cell surface layers (S-layers): from supramolecular cell surface structure to biomimetics and nanotechnology. Angew. Chem. Int. Ed. 38(8),1035-1054. https://pubmed.ncbi.nlm.nih.gov/25138491/
- Schuster B and Sleytr UB (2006) Biomimetic S-layer supported lipid membranes. Current Nanoscience 2, 143–152. https://doi.org/10.2174/157341306776875749
- Ilk N, Egelseer EM and Sleytr UB (2011) S-layer fusion proteins – Construction principles and applications. Current Opinion in Biotechnology 22(6), 824–831. https://pubmed.ncbi.nlm.nih.gov/21696943/
- Ücisik MH, Küpcü S, Debreczeny M, Schuster B and Sleytr UB (2013) S-layer coated Emulsomes as potential nanocarriers. Small 9, 2895–2904. https://onlinelibrary.wiley.com/doi/10.1002/smll.201203116, https://pubmed.ncbi.nlm.nih.gov/23606662/
- Sleytr UB, Schuster B, Egelseer EM and Pum D (2014) S-layers: Principles and applications. FEMS Microbiology Reviews 38(5), 823–864. https://doi.org/10.1111/1574-6976.12063, https://pubmed.ncbi.nlm.nih.gov/24483139/
- Pum, D., U.B. Sleytr. (2014) Reassembly of S-layer proteins. Nanotechnology 25:312001. https://pubmed.ncbi.nlm.nih.gov/25030207/
- Ücisik, M.H., U.B. Sleytr, B. Schuster. (2015) Emulsomes meet S-layer proteins: An emerging targeted drug delivery system. Curr. Pharm. Biotechnol. 16:392-405. https://pubmed.ncbi.nlm.nih.gov/25697368/
- Schuster, B. and Sleytr, U.B. (2014) Biomimetic interfaces based on S-layer proteins, lipid membranes and functional biomoleculesJ. R. Soc. Interface.1120140232. https://royalsocietypublishing.org/doi/10.1098/rsif.2014.0232, https://pubmed.ncbi.nlm.nih.gov/24812051/
- Schuster B and Sleytr UB (2021) S-layer ultrafiltration membranes. Membranes 11(4), 275. https://doi.org/10.3390/membranes11040275
- Qing R, Xue M, Zhao J, Wu L, Breitwieser A, Smorodina E, Schubert T, Azzellino G, Jin D, Kong J, Palacios T, Sleytr UB, Zhang S. Scalable biomimetic sensing system with membrane receptor dual-monolayer probe and graphene transistor arrays. Sci Adv. 2023; 9(29):eadf1402. https://www.science.org/doi/10.1126/sciadv.adf1402, https://pubmed.ncbi.nlm.nih.gov/37478177/
- Buhlheller C, Sagmeister T, Grininger C, Gubensäk N, Sleytr UB, Usón I, Pavkov-Keller T. SymProFold: Structural prediction of symmetrical biological assemblies. Nat Commun. 2024;15(1):8152. https://www.nature.com/articles/s41467-024-52138-3, https://pubmed.ncbi.nlm.nih.gov/39294115/
- Sleytr UB, Pum D. S-layers: from a serendipitous discovery to a toolkit for nanobiotechnology. Q Rev Biophys. 2025 Jan 17;58:e4. https://doi.org/10.1017/S0033583524000106, https://pubmed.ncbi.nlm.nih.gov/39819733/
