= Hans List =

Austrian engineer and inventor (1896–1996)

Hans List (30 April 1896, Graz, Austria – 10 September 1996, Graz) was a technical scientist, inventor and entrepreneur.

== Biography ==
After earning a doctorate in engineering at the Technical University in Graz, Hans List was appointed to the Tongji University in China (1926–1932), followed by teaching positions back home in Graz (1932–1941) and Dresden, Germany (until 1945). His research work yielded insights into functionality and improvement of Diesel motors, and of combustion engines in general. In 1946, List founded an engineering office in Graz, from which the company AVL List ('Anstalt für Verbrennungsmotoren Prof. Dr Hans List') emerged in 1948. In 1979, at the age of 83, he handed over the management of the company AVL List, which had 500 employees at the time, to his son Helmut List.

== Decorations and awards ==
- Austrian Decoration for Science and Art
- Honorary Ring of Styria
- Wilhelm Exner Medal (1971).
- Honorary Citizen of the City of Graz
- Honorary doctorate from the Technical University of Graz (1963)

== See also ==
- List of Austrian companies
