= Hans Tuppy =

Austrian biochemist (1924–2024)

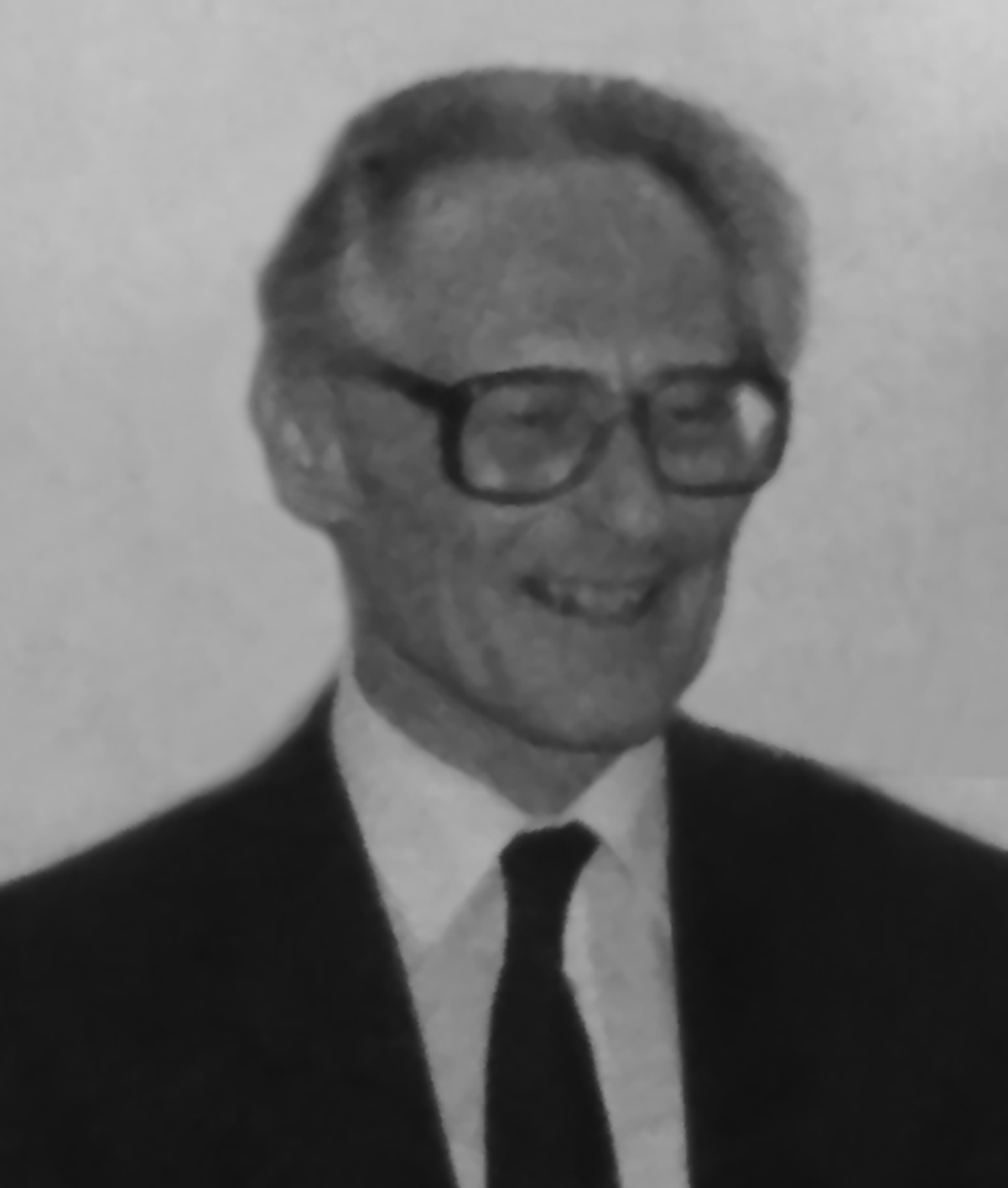
- Born: 22 July 1924; Vienna, Austria
- Died: 24 April 2024 (aged 99)
- Education: University of Vienna
- Known for: Insulin sequencing
- Awards: Schrödinger Prize; Wilhelm Exner Medal (1978).
- Scientific career
- Fields: Biochemistry, protein structure
- Workplaces: Cambridge University, University of Vienna
- Doctoral advisor: Ernst Späth, Friedrich Galinovsky

Hans Tuppy (22 July 1924 – 24 April 2024) was an Austrian biochemist who participated in the sequencing of Insulin, and became Austria's first university professor for biochemistry. He was Austrian Minister for Science and Research from 1987 to 1989.

== Background ==
Hans Tuppy's parents were from the present day Czech Republic, his mother Emma from Prague and his father Karl from Brünn. Karl Tuppy (1 January 1880 – 15 November 1939) was chief prosecutor in the trial against those members of the illegal Austrian Nazi party who had murdered chancellor Engelbert Dollfuss during the abortive 1934 July Putsch. After Austria's Anschluss Karl Tuppy was detained and eventually moved to the Sachsenhausen concentration camp, where he was so savagely beaten upon his arrival that he died the following night. While Hans Tuppy's older brother Peter was killed in action as a Wehrmacht soldier in 1944, Hans (who completed secondary school in 1942) was ordered into the Reichsarbeitsdienst (RAD) but was soon released from duty after suffering a severe injury.

Tuppy died on 24 April 2024, at the age of 99. His death was announced on 8 May.

== Career ==
Tuppy was able to start studying at the University of Vienna even before World War II ended in Austria, thanks to his early release from RAD service. He completed the requirements for his diploma in 1945 and began his doctoral work in the laboratory of Ernst Späth. However, after Späth died in 1946, Tuppy continued his research under the guidance of Friedrich Galinovsky and earned his Ph.D. degree in 1948.

Shortly thereafter Frederick Wessely, Director of the Chemistry Institute recommended Tuppy to Max Perutz for postdoctoral work at Cambridge University. Perutz, in turn, recommended Tuppy to Frederick Sanger. Thus Tuppy joined Sanger's laboratory at Cambridge where he worked on the amino acid sequence of bovine insulin, sequencing its beta chain (Sanger was awarded the Nobel Prize in 1958 for sequencing insulin).

Tuppy's next career step was the Carlsberg Laboratory in Copenhagen, from where he returned to the University of Vienna in 1951 to become an assistant at the Institute for Chemistry II. In 1956 he completed the Habilitation, the highest academic qualification in the Austrian academic system which qualifies the recipient to supervise doctoral students and, ultimately, to hold senior faculty positions. In 1963, Tuppy became Professor of Biochemistry in the Institute of Biochemistry at the University of Vienna. In 1973, he received the Schrödinger Prize of the Austrian Academy of Sciences.

During his distinguished career, Tuppy was President of the Austrian Science Fund (1974–1982), Rector of the University of Vienna (1983–1985), President of the Austria Academy of Sciences (1985–1987) and the Austrian Government Minister for Science and Research (1987–1989) during the chancellorship of Franz Vranitzky. He was chair of the university board of the University of Natural Resources and Applied Life Sciences Vienna from 2003.

== Honours and awards ==
- Austrian Decoration for Science and Art
- Wilhelm Exner Medal, (1978)
- Ludwig Wittgenstein Prize (Austrian Science Foundation, 2002)
- Erwin Schrödinger Prize Austrian Academy of Sciences
- Decoration of Honour for Services to the Republic of Austria
- Member of the Austrian Academy of Sciences
- Member of the German Academy of Sciences Leopoldina
- Member of the Pontifical Academy of Sciences
- Honorary member of the Austrian Neuroscience Association (ANA), inducted at the general assembly on 25 September 2017
