= Wilhelm Exner =

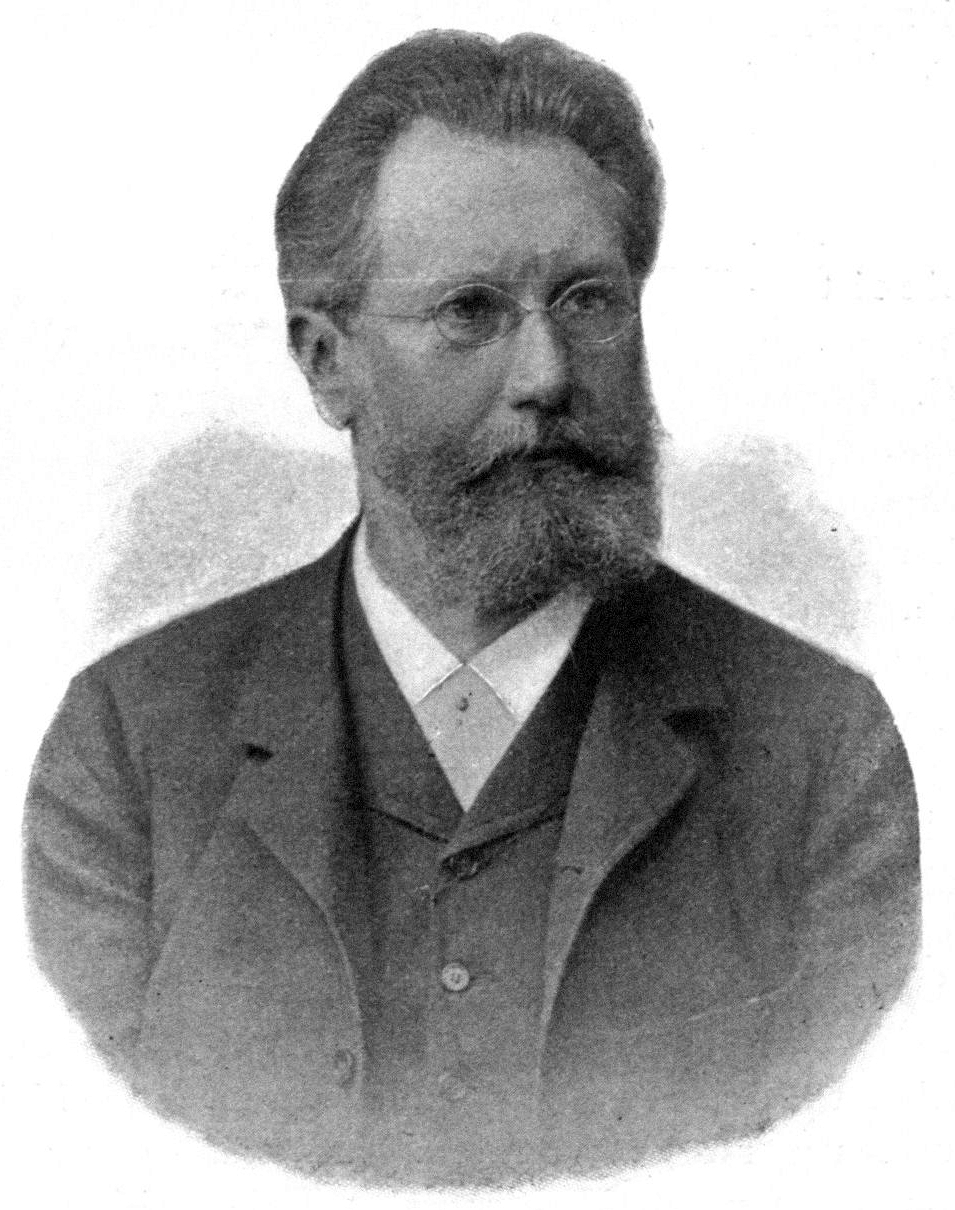
- Born: Wilhelm Franz Exner; 9 April 1840; Gänserndorf, Lower Austria, Austrian Empire,
- Died: 25 May 1931 (aged 91); Vienna, First Austrian Republic

Wilhelm Franz Exner (born 9 April 1840 in Gänserndorf, Lower Austria; died 25 May 1931 in Vienna) was former president of the Austrian Business Association and initiator of the Wilhelm Exner Medal.

== Life and education ==
Exner was the youngest graduate of the Polytechnic Institute of the Department of Performing Geometry, Building and Machine Science at the age of 22. In 1862, Exner attended the World Exposition in London, where he began to start a network of politics and business. In 1875, Wilhelm Exner was appointed Professor of Engineering and between 1881 until 1900 Rector of today’s University of Natural Resources and Life Sciences, Vienna.

== Career ==
Exner established the modern type of vocational schools in Austria, is one of the creator of the Chamber of Labor and was co-founder of the Vienna Technical Museum. The law for examination and material testing goes also back to him.

Due to his affiliation to the Austrian Business Association, the Wilhelm Exner Medal was established in 1921 and was awarded to outstanding scientists and researchers.

== Awards ==
- 1921: Wilhelm Exner Medal

== Others ==
The Wilhelm Exner Hall is named after him and was originally a factory bought by the Department of Trade in 1899. Since 1960, the building is used by the University of Natural Resources and Life Sciences, Vienna. The Wilhelm Exner Gasse is a road in Alsergrund and has been named in honour of Exner's 90th birthday in 1930. Since 2015, the Wilhelm Exner Medal Foundation has been honoring the laureates with the Exner Lectures. The laureates include 20 Nobel Prize winners and engineers like Ferdinand Porsche and Wernher von Braun.

== Publications ==
- Exner, Wilhelm Johann Beckmann : Segrunder Der Technologischen Wissenschaft (1878) Bookdepository.com, published: 10 Sep. 2010; Publisher: Kessinger Publishing, ISBN 9781166149741
- Exner, Wilhelm; Studien über Die Verwaltung Des Eisenbahnwesens Mitteleuropaischer Staaten Waterstones.com, published: 22. May 2015; Publisher: Salzwasser-Verlag Gmbh, ISBN 9783846081419
- Exner, Wilhelm; Das K.K. Polytechnische Institut in Wien, Seine Gründung Bookdepository.com, published: 22. Feb 2017; Publisher: Hansebooks, ISBN 9783744616287
- Exner, Wilhelm; Die Hausindustrie Oesterreichs: Ein Commentar zur Hausindustriellen Abtheilung auf der Allgemeinen Land-und Forstwirthschaftl. Ausstellung Amazon.co.uk, published: 18 Mar. 2018; Publisher: Forgotten Books, ISBN 978-0364420690
- Exner, Wilhelm; Der Antheil Oesterreichs an Den Technischen Fortschritten Der Letzten Hundert Jahre : Zwei Donnerstag-Vorlesungen Gehalten Im Winter-Semester 1873-74 Bookdepository.com, published: 1 Aug. 2018; Publisher Wentworth Press, ISBN 9780274343188
