= AVL List =

Austrian Company for Mobility

AVL List GmbH
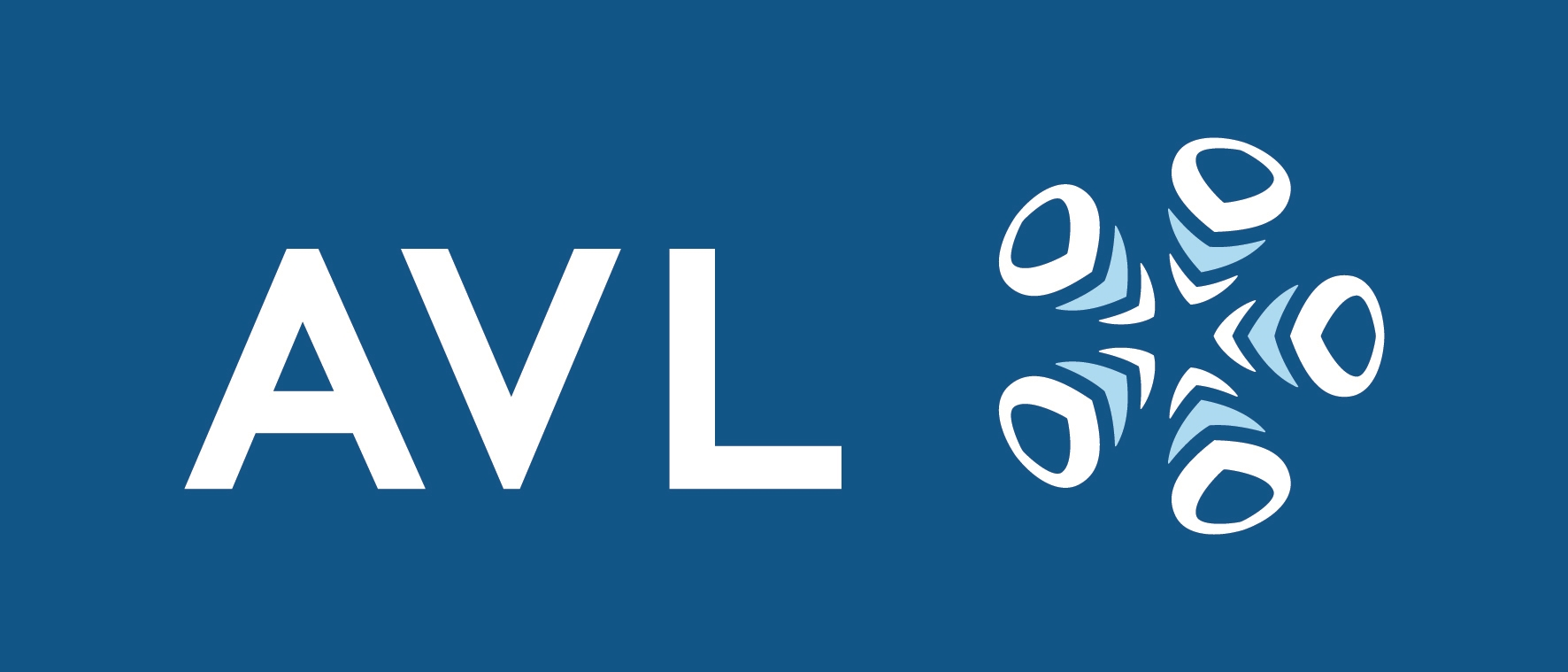
- Type: Private
- Industry: Automotive supplier
- Founded: 1948
- Headquarters: Graz 47.077831°N 15.425120°E
- Revenue: 2.03 billion euros (2024)
- Owner: Helmut List
- Number of employees: > 12.200 (2024)
- Website: avl.com/en

AVL List GmbH is a company for the development, simulation and testing of drive systems in the automotive and other industries. The Austrian company employs more than 12,200 people worldwide (including 4,100 in Graz) and had a turnover of 2.03 billion euros in 2024.

AVL is divided into three business units: Powertrain Engineering, Instrumentation and Test Systems and Advanced Simulation Technology. The current areas of activity include Electrification, Advanced Driver Assistance Systems, Autonomous Driving, Methodologies and Technologies for vehicle development, Emission-free Mobility Solutions and Data Intelligence Services.

== Company history ==
Together with Hans List, several engine researchers founded the IBL (Ingenieurbüro List). The diesel engines from 1949 were already being mass-produced at the Jenbacher Werke in Tyrol and at the Andritzer Maschinenfabrik in Graz. In 1951, the IBL became the AVL, the "Anstalt für Verbrennungskraftmaschinen List" (Institute for Combustion Engines List).

In the 1970s, the AVL List launched fully automatic test beds, capsule technology for engine sound insulation, DI diesel engines for passenger car applications and a LD light diesel engine. In 1979, Helmut List, son of the company's founder Hans List, who had worked for the company since 1966, took over as chairman of the board of management.

Since then, AVL List expanded with further company locations and spin-offs in China and Europe.

2020: Collaboration in an 1.000-km-battery-development-project.

2023: Cooperation with Tongji University and feasibility study focused on developing a Fuel Cell System for heavy-duty trucks.

2024: Acquisition of Piezocryst Advanced Sensorics GmbH ("Piezocryst" or the "Company") from AVL List GmbH (AVL).
