= Ernst Späth =

Austrian chemist

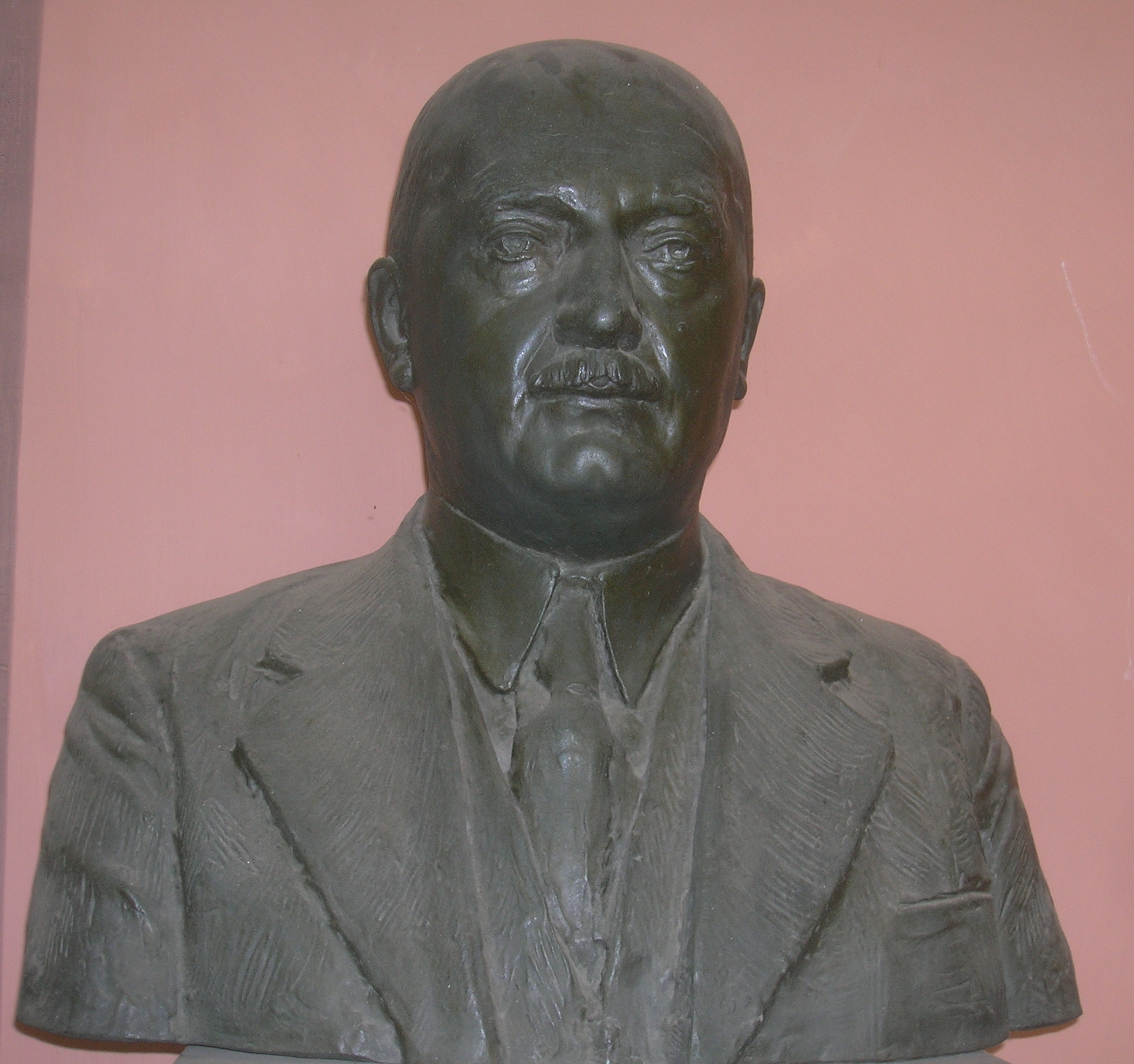
- bust in the Arkadenhof of the University of Vienna
- Born: 14 May 1886; Moravský Beroun, Moravia
- Died: 30 September 1946 (aged 60); Zurich, Switzerland
- Known for: 1919 total synthesis of Mescaline
- Awards: Liebig Medal (1937); Wilhelm Exner Medal (1937)
- Scientific career
- Fields: Phytochemistry
- Doctoral advisor: Rudolf Wegscheider
- Doctoral students: Percy Lavon Julian; Hans Tuppy

Ernst Späth (German pronunciation: [ɛʁnst ˈʃpɛːt]; 14 May 1886 in Moravský Beroun – 30 September 1946 in Zurich) was an Austrian chemist, specializing in natural products.

== Life ==
Späth was the first to synthesise mescaline and was one of the first to synthesize cuscohygrine on a small scale with Hans Tuppy.

He lost everything in World War II, and died with no money. His former student Percy Lavon Julian returned to Vienna, paid for his funeral, and commissioned a bust of Späth, which is still displayed in the foyer of the Faculty of Chemistry of the University of Vienna. A second cast of the bust was erected in 1961 in the Arkadenhof of the University of Vienna.

== See also ==
- List of psychedelic chemists

== Biography ==
- R. Werner Sonkup (2004), Die Wissenschaftliche Welt von Gestern, Wien: Böhlau, pp. 205–216, ISBN 978-3-205-77303-0

== Publications ==
- Ernst Späth (1919), "Über die Anhalonium-Alkaloide. I. Anhalin und Mezcalin", Monatshefte für Chemie - Chemical Monthly, 40 (2): 129–154, doi:10.1007/BF01524590
