= Luisa Torsi =

Italian chemist

- Born: 1964 (age 61–62); Bari
- Education: University of Bari; Bell Labs
- Scientific career
- Workplaces: University of Bari

Luisa Torsi (born 1964) is an Italian chemist who is a professor at the Università degli Studi di Bari. She was the first woman to serve as President of the European Materials Research Society (E-MRS). In 2019 she was named by the International Union of Pure and Applied Chemistry as one of the world's most Distinguished Women in Chemistry.

== Early life and education ==
Torsi was born in Bari. She earned her undergraduate degree in physics at the University of Bari. Torsi has said that she realised that she wanted to be a researcher during her master's research project. She remained there for her graduate studies, switching specialties to chemical sciences. In 1994 Torsi moved to the United States, where she joined Bell Labs as a postdoctoral researcher. During her postdoctoral research Torsi investigated organic field-effect transistors .

== Research and career ==
She returned to Italy in 1993, when she was made Assistant Professor in the Department of Chemistry. In 2005 Torsi was made a full Professor of Chemistry. Her research considers organic semiconductors and their application in electronic devices. She has developed single molecule transistors that are capable of label-free disease detection. The device was capable of detecting zeptomolar concentrations. The discovery launched the Horizon 2020 project SiMBiT, a bio-electronic system that looks to achieve single molecule detection of biomarkers for point-of-care testing. Torsi looks to use nanoparticle based sensor to detect toxic gases.

In 2015 Torsi delivered a TED talk at TEDxBari, where she discussed resilience. Torsi serves on the editorial board of ACS Omega.

== Awards and honours ==
- 2010 Henrick Emmanuel Merck international award
- 2015 Global-Women Inventors and Innovators Network Platinum Prize
- 2016 Elected President of the European Materials Research Society
- 2017 Elected Fellow of the Materials Research Society
- 2018 Italian Chemical Society SCI Silver Medal
- 2019 Alto Riconoscimento "Virtù e Conoscenza"
- 2019 European Chemical Society Robert Kellner Lecturer
- 2019 Elected to the Board of Directors of the Leonardo Foundation
- 2021 Wilhelm Exner Medal

== Selected publications ==
- Dodabalapur, A.; Torsi, L.; Katz, H. E. (1995-04-14). "Organic Transistors: Two-Dimensional Transport and Improved Electrical Characteristics". Science. 268 (5208): 270–271. doi:10.1126/science.268.5208.270. ISSN 0036-8075. PMID 17814790. S2CID 32124694.
- Cioffi, Nicola; Torsi, Luisa; Ditaranto, Nicoletta; Tantillo, Giuseppina; Ghibelli, Lina; Sabbatini, Luigia; Bleve-Zacheo, Teresa; D'Alessio, Maria; Zambonin, P. Giorgio; Traversa, Enrico (2005). "Copper Nanoparticle/Polymer Composites with Antifungal and Bacteriostatic Properties". Chemistry of Materials. 17 (21): 5255–5262. doi:10.1021/cm0505244. ISSN 0897-4756.
- Torsi, Luisa; Magliulo, Maria; Manoli, Kyriaki; Palazzo, Gerardo (2013). "Organic field-effect transistor sensors: a tutorial review". Chemical Society Reviews. 42 (22): 8612–28. doi:10.1039/c3cs60127g. ISSN 0306-0012. PMID 24018860.
