= Hermann Kopetz =

Hermann Kopetz is a professor emeritus at Vienna University of Technology. He was named an IEEE Fellow in 1994 for contributions to fault-tolerant, real-time systems. He is a cofounder of the company TTTech.

== Awards ==
- Wilhelm Exner Medal (2005).
