= Ernst Fiala (engineer) =

Josef Herbert Ernst Fiala (born 2 September 1928) is an Austrian automotive engineer.

== Early life and training ==
Fiala was born on 2 September 1928 in Vienna. Until 1954 Fiala visited mechanical engineering department of the TU Wien. From 1952 to 1954 during his studies he was involved as an assistant at the Institute of internal combustion engine and automotive engineering. 1954 doctorate he with the work cornering forces on rolling pneumatic tires to the doctor the technical sciences.

== Time at Daimler-Benz and at the TU Berlin ==
In 1954 Fiala started his career at Daimler Benz in Sindelfingen, Germany. Until 1963 he worked there as a research and development engineer and most recently as head of the development department for car bodies. In 1963 he was called as a professor to Technische Universität Berlins Institute of Motor Vehicles where he was also in charge of the Technical Testing Center for Motor Vehicles until 1970. Because of the attributed ability to explain complicated technical processes in an easily understandable way, he was ordered in part-time to the directorate of the Hamburg Transport Academy.

== Change to Volkswagen and developing the VW Golf ==
Due to student agitations, university reform and a new university law Ernst Fiala left the TU Berlin in 1970 and changed to Volkswagen Group in Wolfsburg. There, he took over the central research department and since March 1972 temporary supervision of the research and development department. In 1973 he was appointed Volkswagen board member and remained in this role until 1988. In his time the introduction of the Volkswagen Golf Mk1, which came on the market in 1974, replacing the Beetle and became one of the most successful vehicles. In expanding the vehicle range by the Polo, Derby and Jetta als well as the VW commercial vehicle program (VW LT), he had to deal with the consequences of the 1973 oil crisis, the growing environmental awareness and the increased safety requirements. He had a share in the development of the catalytic converter, the lowering of the drag coefficient, making the diesel engine suitable for middle-class cars and the track-stabilized steering.

After completing the age of 60 Fiala gave up his job for dedicated more intensively scientific and journalistic work. As a consultant, he stayed in touch with Volkswagen, and as honorary professor at the Vienna University of Technology he taught the subject "Interrelations between man and vehicle". To date, Ernst Fiala has published numerous technical articles, became granted more than 100 patents. He is a member of several supervisory boards.

== Publications (German) ==
- Soviel Auto braucht der Mensch (1990)
- Was nach dem Auto kommt. Zur Naturgeschichte der Mobilität (1994)
- Abenteuer Elektroauto. Eine umstrittene Technologie im Vakuum der Verkehrspolitik (1994)
- Wachstum ohne Grenzen (2000)
- Mensch und Fahrzeug. Fahrzeugführung und sanfte Technik (2006)

== Awards ==
- 1985: Wilhelm Exner Medal
- 1987: Upper Golden Award for Achievements of the Republic of Austria
- Honorary Doctorate of the Heidelberg University
- Honorary Doctorate of the University of Kragujevac
- 1971: Golden Diesel Ring of the Association of Motor Journalists for special services to traffic safety
- 2008: Béla Barényi Award
