= Helmut List =

Austrian industrialist and philanthropist

Helmut List (born 20 December 1941, Graz) is an Austrian engineer, businessman and philanthropist. He was CEO of AVL, (Anstalt für Verbrennungskraftmaschinen List, "List Institute for Combustion Engines") which was founded by his father, the engineer and inventor Hans List, in 1948.

The Helmut-List-Halle is named after him. It is a large multi-purpose cultural venue, serving for many events during the annual Styrian Autumn Festival. The hall features ideal acoustic conditions for classical concerts.

== Decorations and awards ==
- 2002: Honorary Ring of Graz
- 2003: Wilhelm Exner Medal.
- 2005: Grand Decoration of Styria
- 2010: Grand Gold Decoration of Styria
- 2012: Austrian Cross of Honour for Science and Art, 1st class
