= Vienna Museum of Science and Technology =

Museum in Vienna, Austria

Coordinates: 48°11′27″N 16°19′03″E

- Technisches Museum Wien

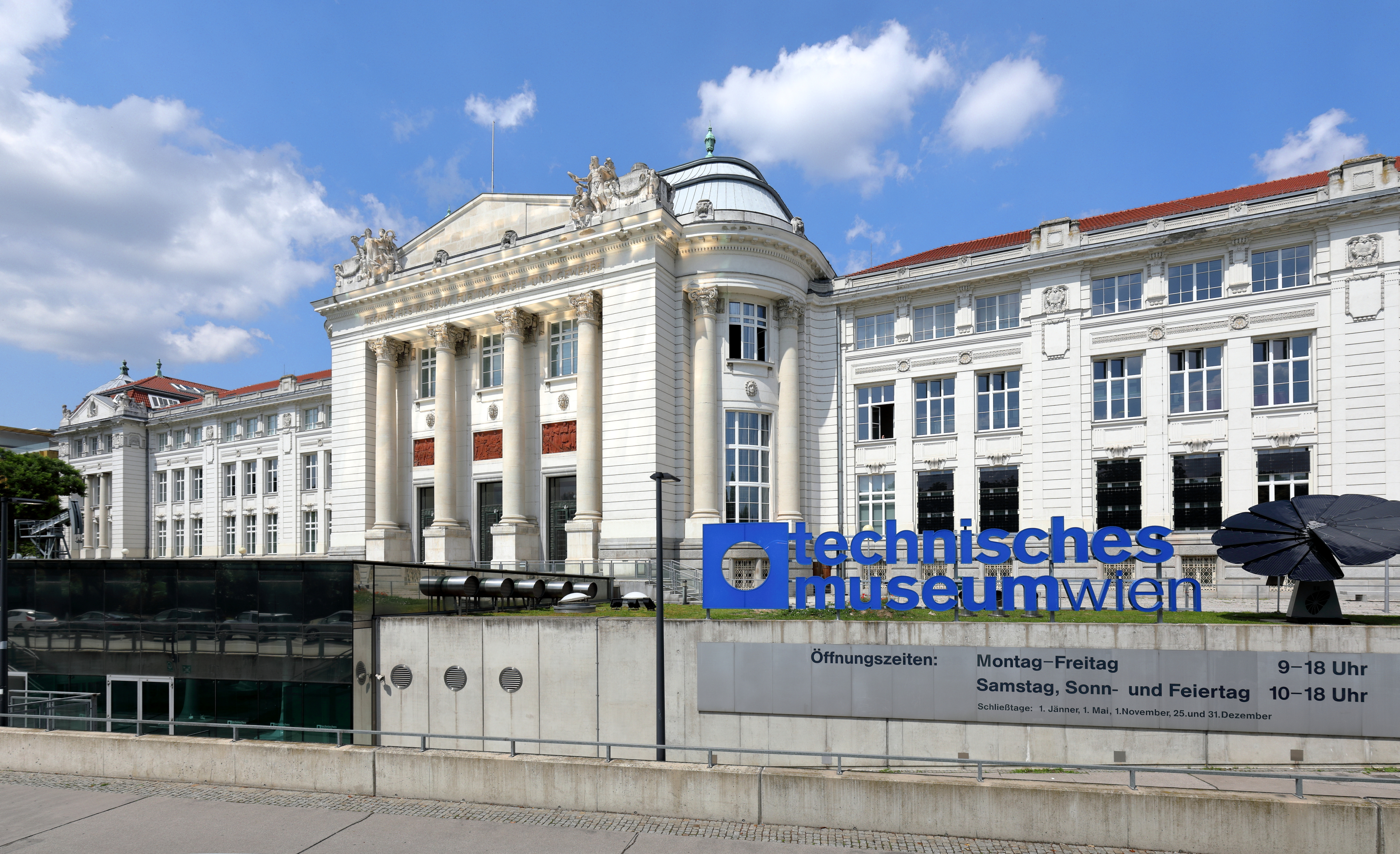
- Established: 6 May 1918
- Location: Vienna, Austria
- Type: Technology museum
- Visitors: 467.894 (2024)
- Director: Peter Aufreiter
- Website: www.technischesmuseum.at/en

The Vienna Museum of Science and Technology (German: Technisches Museum Wien) is a museum in Penzing, Vienna, Austria, on Mariahilfer Straße. The museum showcases the history and development of technology, industry, and science, with a focus on Austrian involvement. It houses numerous historical models, such as those from the fields of rail transport, shipbuilding, aviation, and industry, as well as one of the largest collections of historical musical instruments in Austria.

== History ==
=== Prehistory ===
In 1908, to mark the 60th anniversary of Emperor Franz Joseph I's accession to the throne, it was decided to establish a Technical Museum for Industry and Trade in Vienna. The initiative was primarily driven by Wilhelm Exner, who had advocated for the idea of such a museum since the 1873 Vienna World's Fair. The project was funded by industrialists and bankers, including the Rothschild bank. The same year, the National Technical Museum in Prague, also within Austria-Hungary, was opened.

Once the location was determined, with the museum set to be built in the 14th district of Vienna near the imperial residence in Schönbrunn on land provided free of charge by the city, initial studies were prepared by Viennese Historicist architect Emil von Förster. After his sudden death in 1909, a design competition was held among architects working in Vienna, including Otto Wagner, Adolf Loos, Rudolf Tropsch, and Max Ferstel. The participants had only two months to submit their designs. Otto Wagner, a leading member of the Vienna Secession movement, won the competition; however, the heir to the throne, Archduke Franz Ferdinand, a staunch opponent of modern art, overruled the decision and declared the design by Hans Schneider, which closely resembled Förster's plans, the winner.

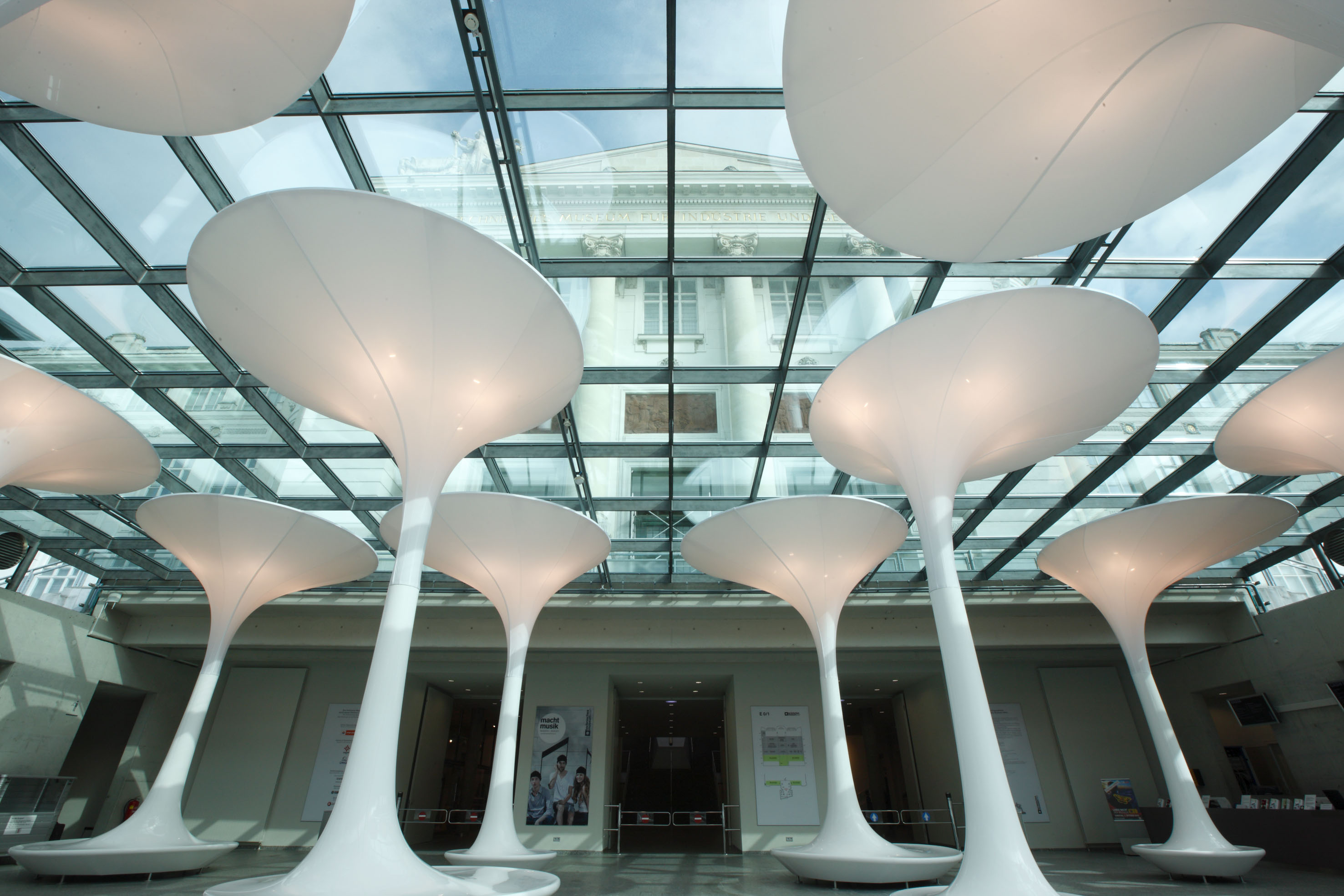
Entrance hall

=== Establishment ===
The cornerstone was laid by Emperor Franz Joseph I on June 20, 1909. The building was completed in 1913, but its opening, initially planned for 1914, was delayed due to World War I until 1918. By March 1919, the museum had already welcomed its 100,000th visitor. Until 1922, the museum was operated by an association, after which it was nationalized for financial reasons, as many former backers had withdrawn following the collapse of the monarchy and the instability of the post-war period.

=== Nazi era and restitution ===
During the Nazi period, the Technical Museum acquired objects and materials that had been stolen from Jews. Following the enactment of the Federal Art Restitution Act in 1998, efforts were made to return looted objects to their rightful owners. The museum remained intact during World War II but received few visitors due to school closures and the ban on Jewish individuals.

=== Modern history ===
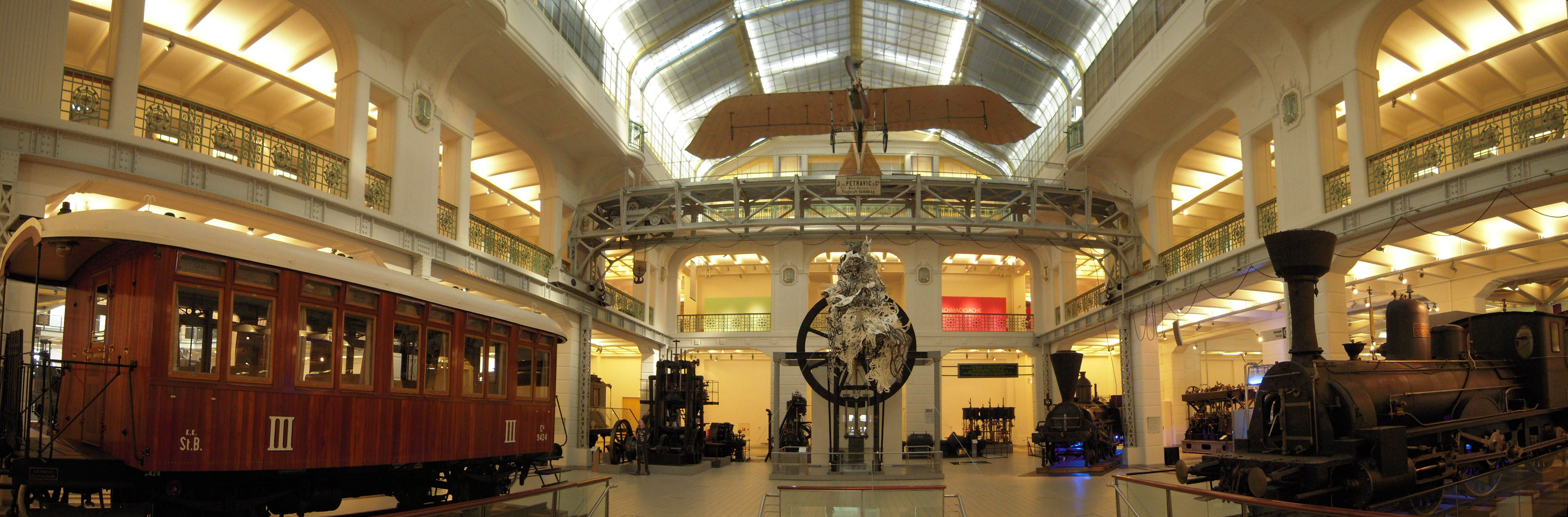
Central hall

After the war, one-third of the museum's staff were affected by the Verbotsgesetz 1947, which required former NSDAP members to register themselves to local authorities. In 1984, concerns were raised about the deteriorating conditions of federal museums. In response, the government allocated several million schillings for restoration efforts, with nearly 502 million schillings designated exclusively for the comprehensive renovation of the Technical Museum. The renovation, which began in July 1994, lasted over three years. Due to leadership changes and exhibition redesigns, the museum's reopening was delayed until 1999.

== Exhibitions ==
Since the exhibitions focus on communicating technical concepts, they feature numerous functional models that allow visitors to explore and understand technical processes. These models are regularly updated to reflect the latest technological advancements.

Additionally, part of the collection includes items from the early 19th century, originating from the k.k. Fabriksprodukten-Kabinett, established in 1807 to document industrial products from the early stages of the monarchy's industrialization.

=== Road vehicles ===
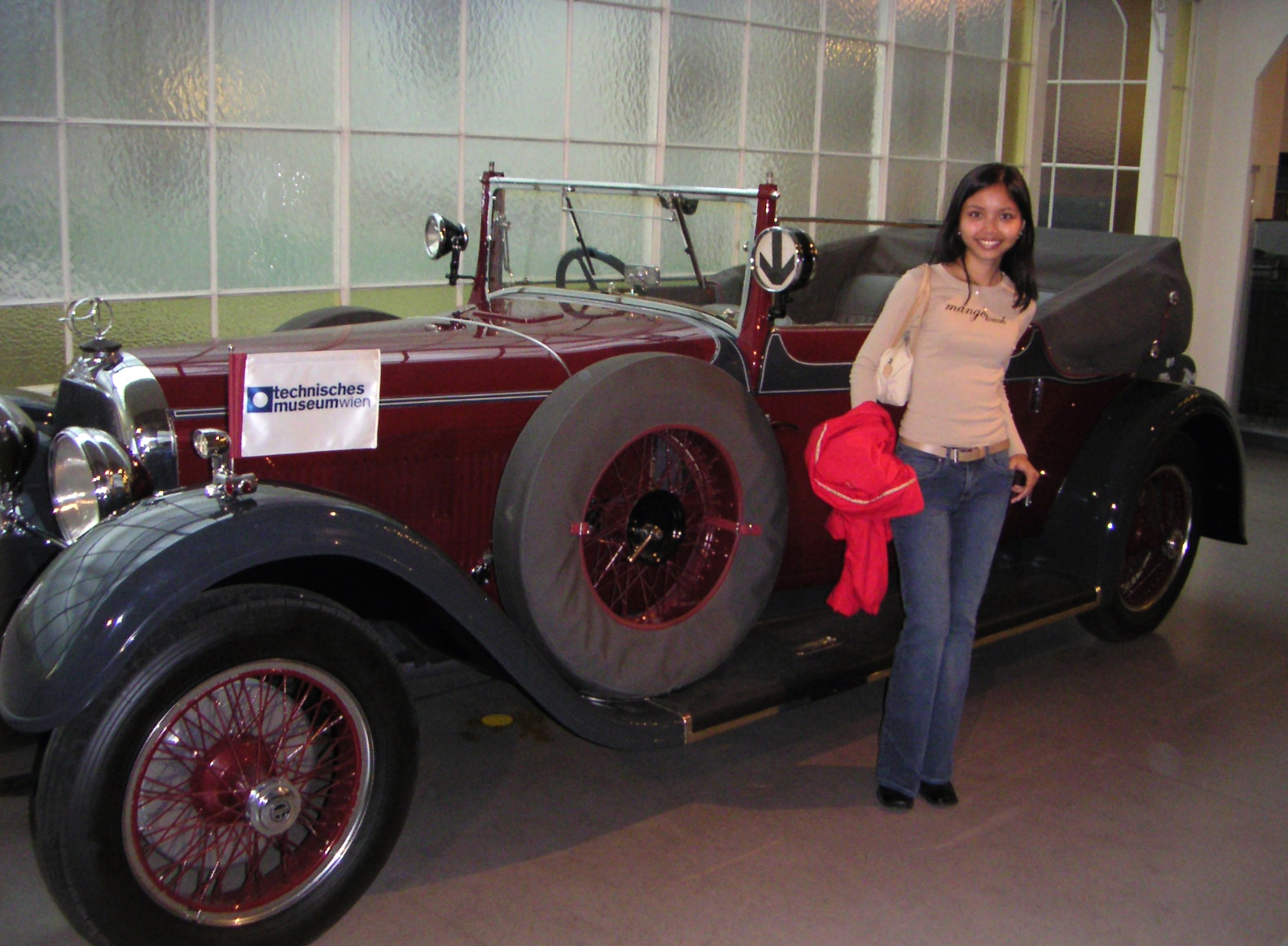
Austro-Daimler

The road vehicle department showcases milestones in Austrian automotive history, featuring brands such as Austro-Daimler, Gräf & Stift, Steyr, and Puch. Among the oldest exhibits are the Benz of Eugen Zardetti, the first gasoline-powered automobile operated in Austria, and the second Marcus car, one of the oldest vehicles preserved in its original condition. In 2006, a functioning replica of the Marcus car was unveiled, allowing for test drives and public demonstrations.

== Gallery ==
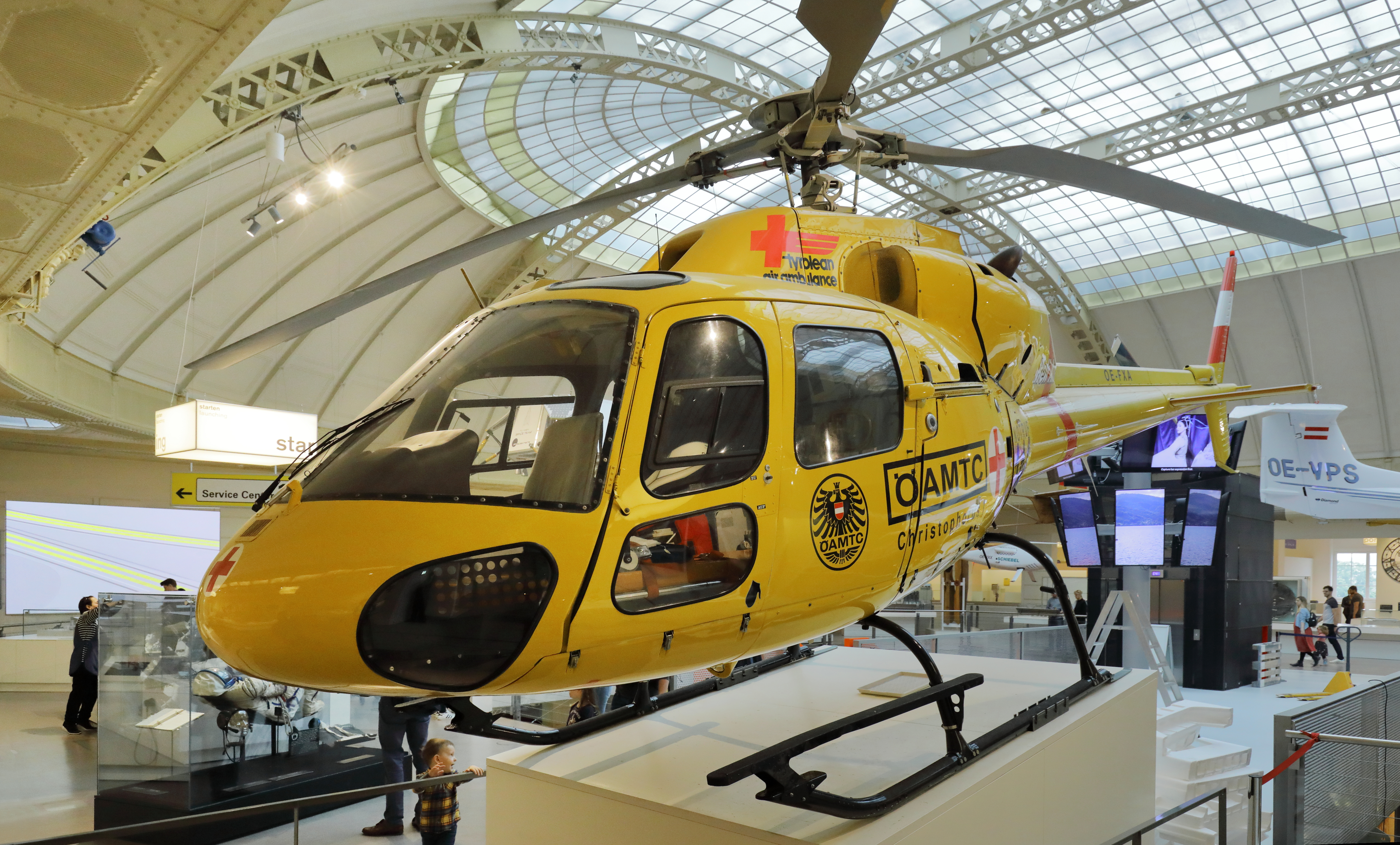
Austria's first rescue helicopter

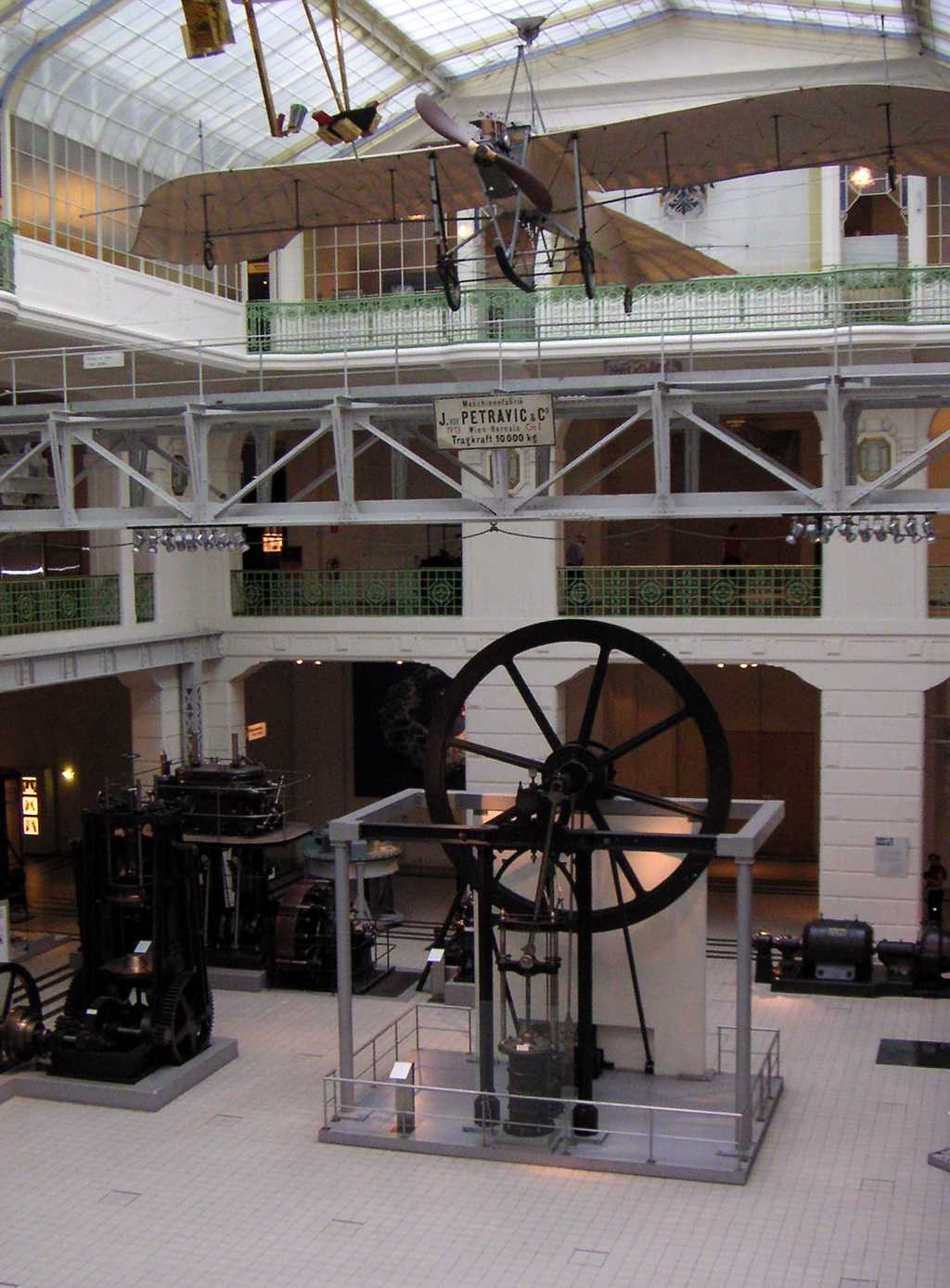
Etrich Taube

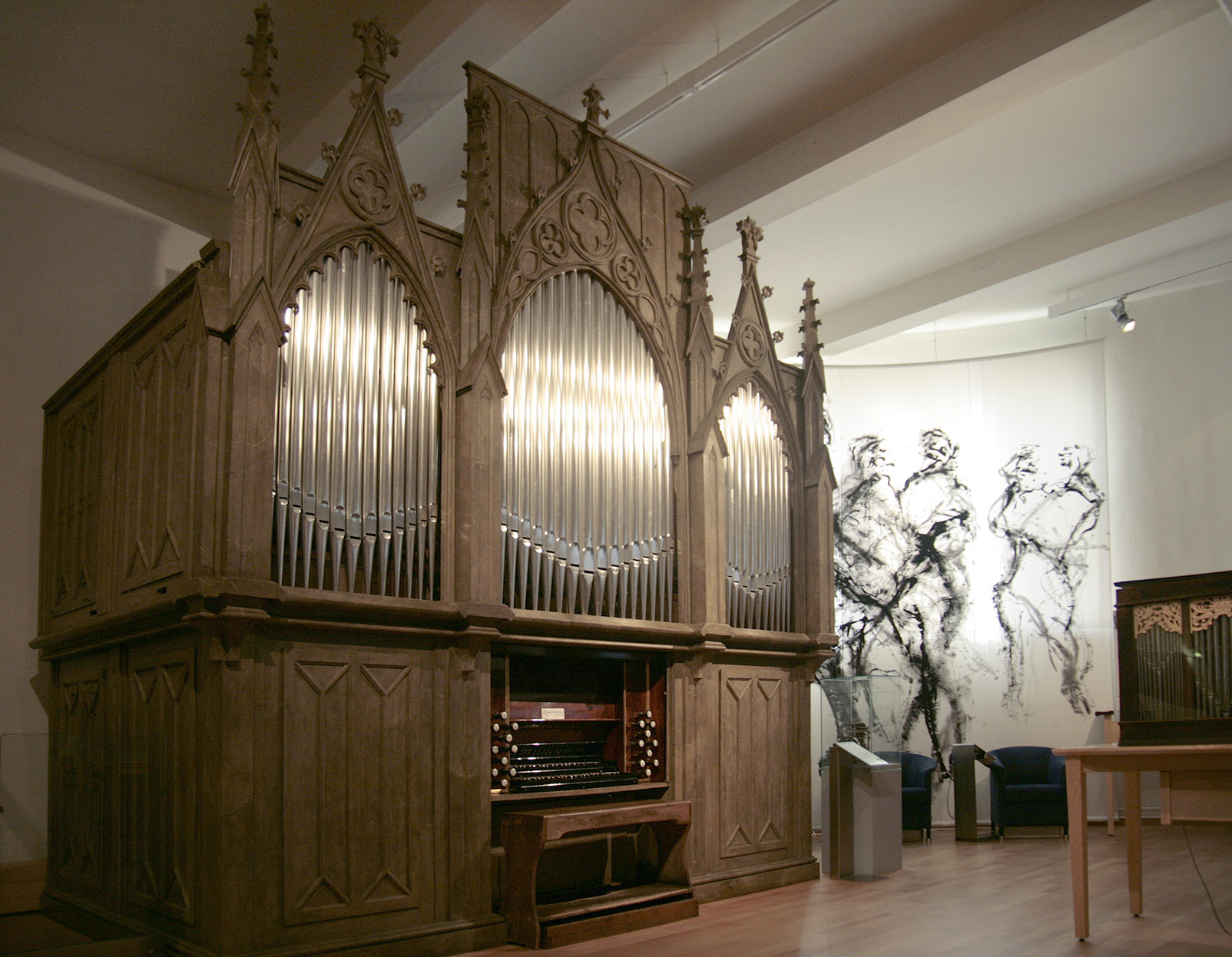
Organ of the Hofburg Chapel

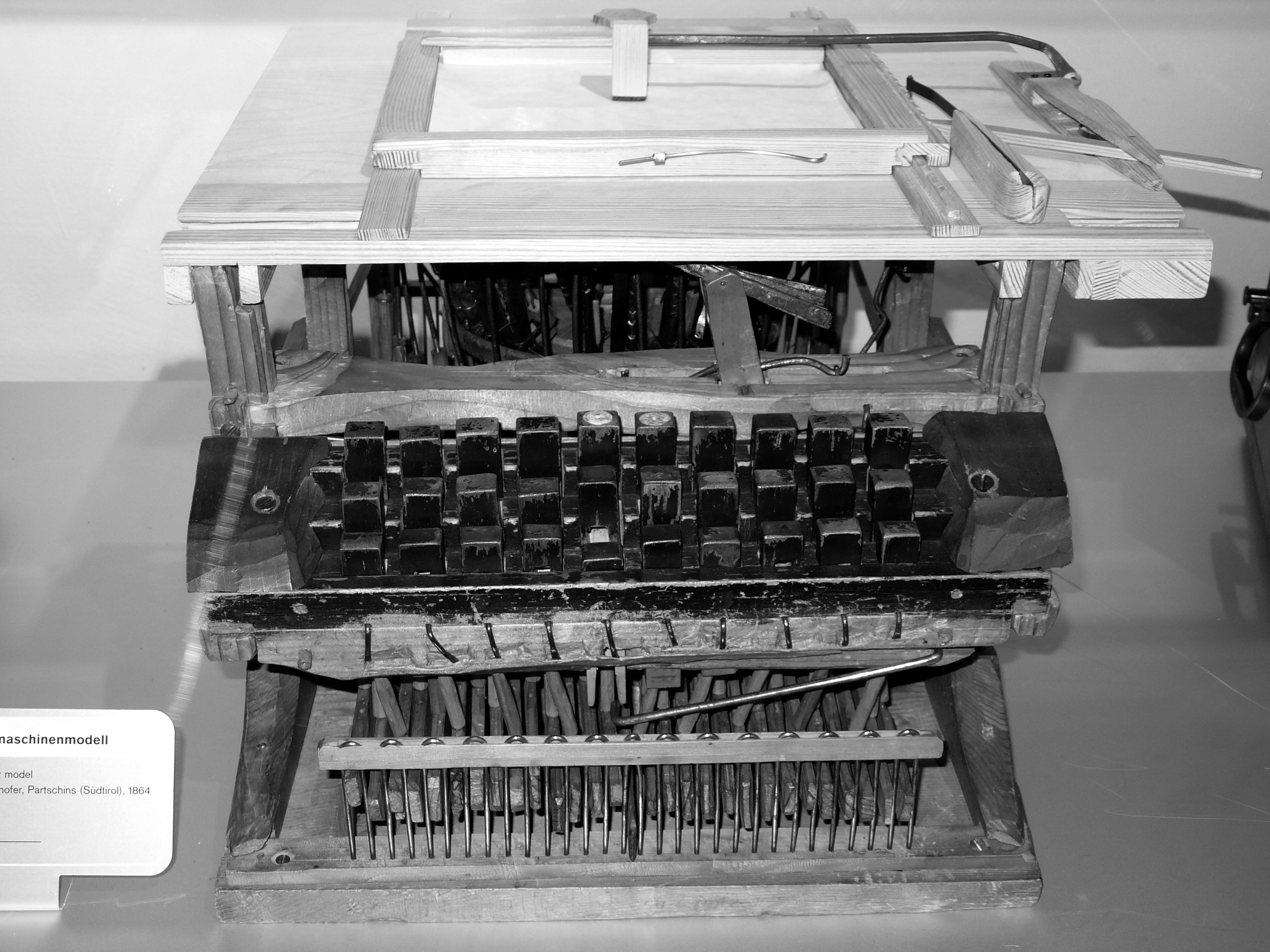
Typewriter of Peter Mitterhofer (1864)

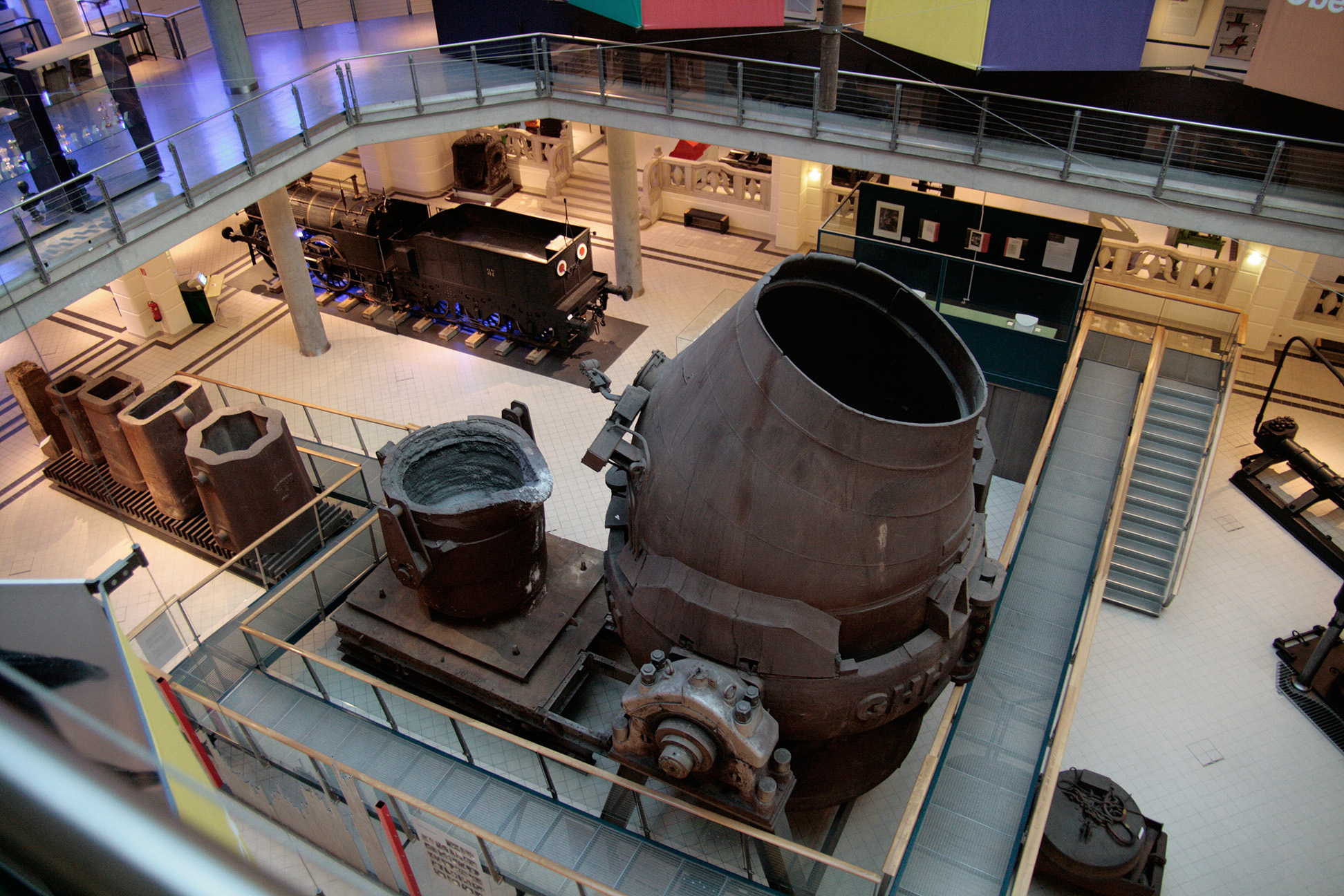
LD crucible (1952)
