= Reissig (surname) =

Reissig is a German surname. Notable people with the surname include:

- Bertold Reissig (1877–1960), German stage and film actor
- Christian Ludwig Reissig (1784–1847), German romantic poet
- Hans-Ulrich Reissig (born 9 May 1949), German chemist
- Julio Herrera y Reissig (1875–1910), Uruguayan poet and essayist
- Nicolas Reissig (born 1989), Austrian tennis player
