= Nusser =

Nusser or Nüsser is a surname. Notable people with this name include:

- Josef Mayr-Nusser (1910–1945), Catholic martyr for refusing to become a Nazi soldier
- Andrés Nusser, founding member of Astro (Chilean band)
- Franz Nusser, Austrian meteorologist, namesake of Nusser Island
- James Nusser (1905–1979), actor in Gunsmoke
- Josef Nüsser (1931–2023), Czech skier and Olympian
- Larissa Nüsser (born 2000), Dutch handball player
- Laura Nusser, victim of serial killer Vincent Johnson
- Robert Nusser (1931–2001), Austrian ice hockey player and Olympian
- Sarah Nusser (born 1957), American statistician
- Zoltan Nusser, Hungarian physiologist

== See also ==
- Nußhardt, a German mountain also sometimes called Nusser
