= Liebig Medal =

Professional award in Germany

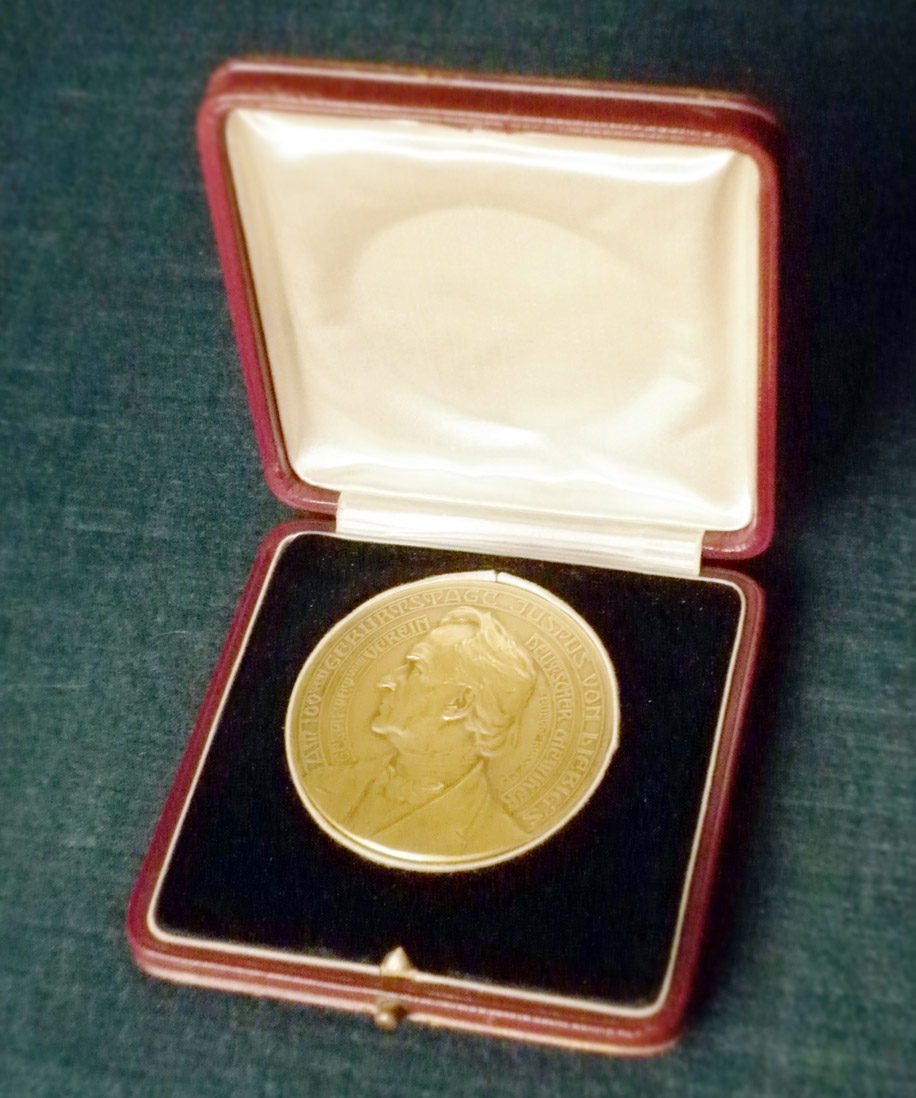
Liebig Commemorative Coin, 1904

The Liebig Medal (German: Liebig-Denkmünze) was established by the Society of German Chemists (Gesellschaft Deutscher Chemiker) in 1903 to celebrate the centenary of Justus von Liebig. Since 1946 it has been awarded by the Society of German Chemists (Gesellschaft Deutscher Chemiker, GDCh).

== Recipients ==
Source: Gesellschaft Deutscher Chemiker (GDCh)

- 1903 Adolf von Baeyer, Munich
- 1904 Rudolf Knietsch, Ludwigshafen
- 1905 Eduard Buchner, Würzburg
- 1907 Adolph Frank, Berlin
- 1908 Otto Schönherr, Dresden
- 1909 Otto Schott, Jena
- 1911 Paul Ehrlich, Frankfurt am Main
- 1912 Carl Dietrich Harries, Berlin
- 1913 Emil Ehrensberger, Traunstein
- 1914 Fritz Haber, Berlin
- 1919 Carl Bosch, Ludwigshafen
- 1921 Max Planck, Berlin
- 1922 Wilhelm Normann, Chemnitz
- 1924 Max Schroeder, Berlin
- 1925 Gustav Tammann, Göttingen
- 1926 Robert-Emanuel Schmidt, Wuppertal-Elberfeld
- 1927 Fritz Raschig, Ludwigshafen
- 1928 Friedrich Bergius, Heidelberg
- 1929 Hans Fischer, München
- 1930 Otto Ruff, Breslau
- 1931 Friedrich Emich, Graz; Ida Noddack and Walter Noddack, Berlin
- 1933 Adolf Spilker, Duisburg
- 1934 Ferdinand Flury, Würzburg
- 1935 Walther A. Roth, Braunschweig and Karl Ziegler, Heidelberg
- 1936 Gustav F. Hüttig, Prag
- 1937 Ernst Späth, Vienna
- 1938 Eduard Zintl, Darmstadt
- 1940 Otto Hönigschmid, Munich
- 1950 Erich Konrad, Leverkusen
- 1951 Wilhelm Klemm, Münster
- 1953 Wilhelm Moschel, Leverkusen
- 1955 Feodor Lynen, München
- 1956 Heinrich Hock, Clausthal
- 1957 Friedrich Adolf Paneth, Mainz
- 1958 Gerhard Schramm, Tübingen
- 1960 Georg-Maria Schwab, Munich
- 1961 Rolf Huisgen, Munich
- 1964 Günter Scheibe, Munich
- 1965 Wilhelm Husmann, Aachen
- 1967 Erich Thilo, Berlin
- 1969 Oskar Glemser, Göttingen
- 1972 Hans-Werner Kuhn, Göttingen
- 1973 Leopold Horner, Mainz
- 1976 Horst Pommer, Ludwigshafen
- 1980 Ernst Ruch, Berlin
- 1981 Armin Weiss, Munich
- 1983 Dieter Oesterhelt, Munich
- 1984 Ulrich Schöllkopf, Göttingen
- 1986 Rolf Appel, Bonn
- 1987 Gerhard Ertl, Berlin
- 1989 Meinhart Zenk, Munich
- 1991 Kurt Issleib, Halle/Saale
- 1993 Reinhard W. Hoffmann, Marburg
- 1994 Wolfgang Beck, Munich
- 1996 Werner Kutzelnigg, Bochum
- 1998 Helmut Schwarz, Berlin
- 2000 Reinhart Ahlrichs, Karlsruhe
- 2002 Hans Wolfgang Spiess, Mainz
- 2004 Arndt Simon, Stuttgart
- 2006 Herbert Mayr, Munich
- 2008 Wolfgang Krätschmer, Heidelberg
- 2010 Joachim Sauer, Berlin
- 2012 Walter Thiel, Mülheim a.d. Ruhr
- 2014 Hans-Ulrich Reissig, Berlin
- 2016 Markus Antonietti, Potsdam
- 2018 Wolfgang Schnick, München
- 2020 Herbert Waldmann, Dortmund
- 2022 Claudia Felser, Dresden
- 2024 Katharina Landfester, Mainz

== See also ==
- List of chemistry awards
