= Carl von Than =

Hungarian chemist (1834–1908)

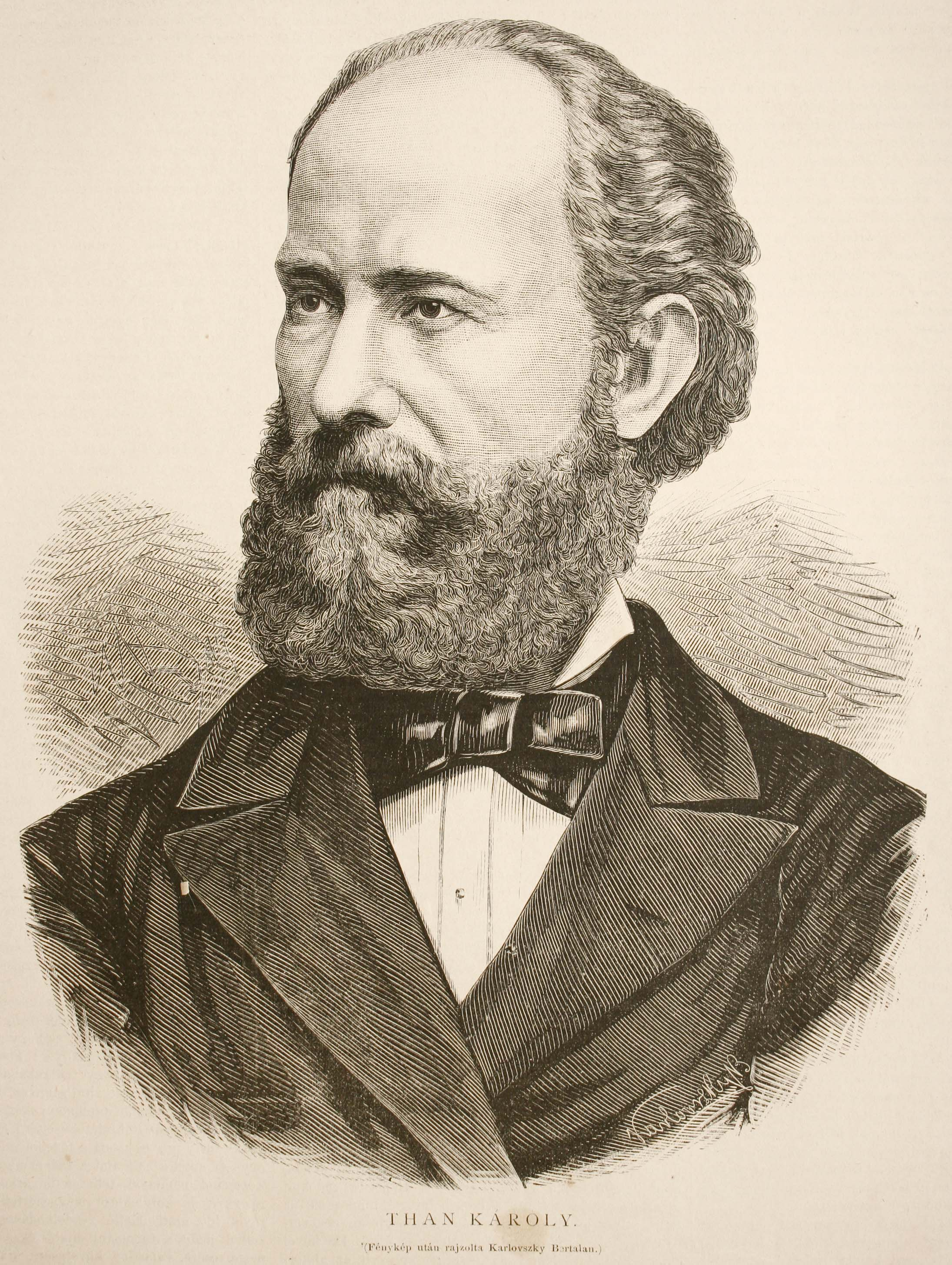
- Than c. 1880
- Born: 20 December 1834; Óbecse, Kingdom of Hungary, Austrian Empire (today Bečej, Serbia)
- Died: 5 July 1908 (aged 73); Budapest, Austria-Hungary (today Hungary)
- Known for: discovery of carbonyl sulfide
- Awards: Lieben Prize 1868
- Scientific career
- Fields: organic chemistry
- Doctoral advisor: Josef Redtenbacher
- Doctoral students: Gusztáv Buchböck

Károly Antal Than de Apát – also called as Carl von Than – (20 December 1834 – 5 July 1908) was a Hungarian chemist who discovered carbonyl sulfide in 1867.

== Life ==
AKároly Than was born in Óbecse, Kingdom of Hungary, Austrian Empire (today Bečej, Serbia). His mother was Otillia Setényi. He interrupted his education and joined the Hungarian army in the war of independence 1848 at the age of 14. On his return, he found his mother dead and his father ruined. Than worked in several pharmacies to earn money form completing his education. After attending a school in Szeged, Than started to study medicine and later chemistry at the University of Vienna. He received his PhD for work with Josef Redtenbacher in 1858. After working for some time as assistant of Redtenbacher, he left to study with Robert Bunsen at the University of Heidelberg and with Charles-Adolphe Wurtz at the University of Paris. On his return to Redtenbacher in 1859, he worked as lecturer at the University of Vienna.

The University of Budapest was in need of Hungarian-speaking professors due to a change from German to Hungarian teaching language in 1860. Theodor Wertheim changed to the University of Graz and Than was offered the vacant position which he occupied until his retirement in 1908. Than married Ervina Terézia Mária Albertina Kleinschmidt in 1872 and had five children. He published the first Hungarian chemistry journal (Magyar Chémiai Folyóirat) and was the president of the Hungarian Society of Natural Science from 1872 until his death. He was made baron in 1908, and died, suddenly, the same year.

== Discovery of carbonyl sulfide ==
Than was aware of existence of the two compounds carbon dioxide (CO_{2}) and carbon disulfide (CS_{2}) and so he tried to synthesize COS. In his first experiments he reacted carbon monoxide (CO) with sulfur. The reaction yielded some product which Than was unable to purify. The second approach to create the COS was by hydrolysis of thiocyanic acid. The reaction of potassium thiocyanate and sulfuric acid yielded a gas containing significant amount of byproducts (HCN, H_{2}O and CS_{2}) and required purification.

KSCN + 2 H_{2}SO_{4} + H_{2}O → KHSO_{4} + NH_{4}HSO_{4} + COS

Than was able to characterize most of the properties of carbonyl sulfide and also tried to determine the chemical reactions of carbonyl sulfide. For these achievements, he received the Lieben Prize in 1868.
