= Stefanie Horovitz =

Polish chemist (1877–1942)

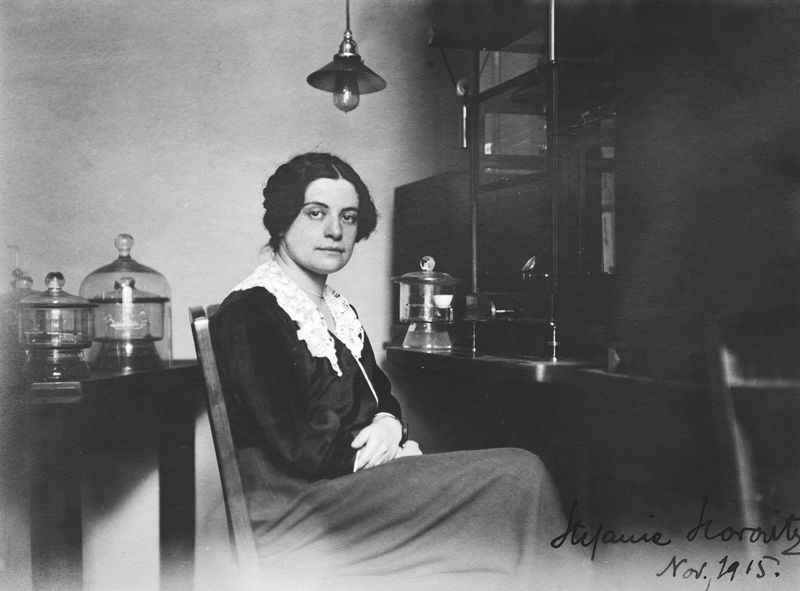
- Born: 1887; Warsaw, Poland
- Died: 1942 (aged 54–55); Treblinka extermination camp
- Education: University of Vienna
- Scientific career
- Workplaces: Institute for Radium Research, Vienna

Stefanie Horovitz (1887–1942) (Stefania Horovitz or Stephanie Horowitz) was a Polish-Jewish chemist known for experimental work proving the existence of isotopes. Between approximately 1914–1918, she worked with Otto Hönigschmid at the Radium Institute of Vienna using analytical methods to demonstrate the first and second credible cases of isotopes in lead and thorium. Later she co-founded a home for children and young adults in need of psychological therapy. She was killed by Nazis at Treblinka extermination camp in 1942.

== Early life and education ==
Horovitz was born in Warsaw on 17 April 1887. Her father was the artist Leopold Horovitz, a successful painter known for Baroque style portraiture. Her mother's maiden name was Rosa London and she had one sister. The family moved to Vienna around 1890.

She was educated at the University of Vienna beginning in 1907, earning a PhD in organic chemistry in 1914. Her advisor was Guido Goldschmiedt and her doctoral research was on the rearrangement of quinone using sulfuric acid.

== Scientific career ==
At the recommendation of Lise Meitner, Horovitz was recruited by Otto Hönigschmid at the Institute for Radium Research, Vienna in 1913 or 1914. At this time, the radioactive displacement law of Fajans and Soddy was a recent development in radiochemistry. It predicted that lead resulting from the radioactive decay of uranium or thorium would have different atomic weights than typical lead. Early experimental data was not considered authoritative by analytical chemists. Hönigschmid had studied under leading expert Theodore Williams Richards at Harvard and his work in determining precise atomic weights was well respected. Hönigschmid was asked by Fajans and Soddy to determine the atomic weight of lead from radioactive sources to demonstrate the existence of isotopes.

Horovitz undertook the laborious process of separating, purifying, and measuring lead with fine accuracy. First, she isolated lead from uranium-rich pitchblende samples from the nearby St. Joachmistal mine. The purification process involved many rounds of washing, dissolving, filtering, and recrystallization to yield a lead chloride sample completely free of contamination. Her gravimetric analysis to the thousandth of a gram proved that lead created from the radioactive decay of uranium had a lower atomic weight (206.736) than typical lead (207.190). This was the first widely accepted experimental proof that elements could have different atomic weights depending on the source.

Horovitz and Hönigschmid later proved that ionium, a radioactive element discovered by Bertram Boltwood, was in fact an isotope of thorium. This experimental work disproved the existence of a widely accepted element and established thorium as a second element with isotopes.

The two scientists co-published their work, and Horovitz was publicly recognized as a contributor both by Hönigschmid and Soddy. This recognition is notable because at the time it was common for female scientists to be limited to assistant positions. However, after Hönigschmid's death Horovitz's name seems to have been dropped and her contribution nearly forgotten.

== Later years and circumstances of death ==
After World War I, Horovitz's career was disrupted by family matters and political upheaval. In a major career shift, she established a foster home in Vienna providing therapy for children with Alice Friedmann, an Adlerian psychologist.

She returned to Warsaw with her sister in 1937, and Nazis descended on the city forming a Jewish ghetto in 1940. Her exact date of death is unknown. Correspondence from Kazimierz Fajans indicates that she returned to Warsaw and was killed by the Nazis in 1940. Other sources explain that Horovitz and her sister reported themselves to Umschlagplatz in 1942 to avoid endangering others, but the details are unclear. They were transported to the Treblinka extermination camp and were among 900,000 Jews who did not survive there. Records indicate Horovitz was murdered in a gas chamber in 1942.

== Published works ==
- Hönigschmid, Otto; Horovitz, Stefanie; Richards, Th. W.; Lembert, M. E. (1915). "Das Atomgewicht des Urans und des Bleis". Zeitschrift für Analytische Chemie. 54 (1): 70–72. doi:10.1007/BF01453144. S2CID 97812424.
- Hönigschmid, Otto; Horovitz, Stefanie (1916). "Mitteilungen aus dem Institut für Radiumforschung". Monatshefte für Chemie und verwandte Teile anderer Wissenschaften. 37 (6): 305–334. doi:10.1007/BF01521416.
