= Bertram Boltwood =

American radiochemistry pioneer (1870–1927)

Bertram Borden Boltwood
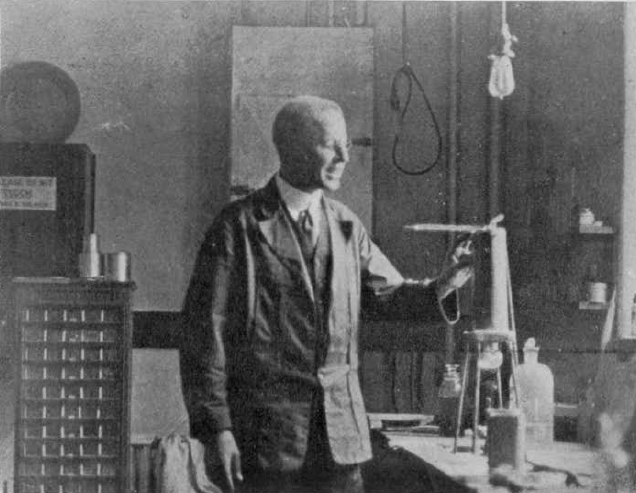
- Boltwood at Yale 1917
- Born: July 27, 1870; Amherst, Massachusetts
- Died: August 15, 1927 (aged 57); Hancock, Maine
- Education: Yale University
- Known for: Radiochemistry
- Scientific career
- Fields: Radiochemistry

Bertram Borden Boltwood (July 27, 1870 – August 15, 1927) was an American pioneer of radiochemistry.

Boltwood attended Yale University, became a professor there and in 1910 was appointed chair of the first academic department of radiochemistry. He established that lead (the metal) was the final decay product of uranium, noted that the lead-uranium ratio was greater in older rocks and, acting on a suggestion by Ernest Rutherford, he was the first to measure the age of rocks by the decay of uranium to lead, in 1907. He obtained results of 400 to 2200 million years, the first successful use of radioactive decay by Pb/U chemical dating. More recently, older mineral deposits have been dated to about 4.4 billion years old, close to the best estimate of the age of Earth.

His work with the uranium decay series led to the discovery of the parent of radium, a new element that he named ionium. Once the existence of isotopes was established, ionium was shown to in fact be thorium-230. Although Boltwood did not get his element on the periodic table, he later got a mineral namesake: Boltwoodite which is named after him.

In his later days, Boltwood suffered from depression and committed suicide on August 15, 1927.

== Early life and family ==
Bertram Boltwood was born on July 27, 1870, in the Amherst, Massachusetts home of his grandfather, Lucius Boltwood. After relocating from England in the 17th century, the Boltwood family was active in the Amherst community for generations. Lucius was the son of a farmer who worked his way through Williams College to become a lawyer. He was a founder of Amherst College and ran for Governor of Massachusetts as an early member of the Liberty Party in 1841. Thomas Kast Boltwood, son of Lucius, was a lawyer who died in 1872 when his son Bertram was 2 years old. Bertram Boltwood was emotionally close with his mother, Margaret Mathilda, and he grew up in her hometown of Castleton, NY. She prepared him to attend Yale, his father's alma mater, by placing him in private school at a young age, followed by the Albany Academy.

Boltwood’s childhood reveals influences and inclinations that foreshadow the scientist he became as an adult. As a boy, he was interested in mechanical gadgets and enjoyed hobbies such as fishing, photography, and minerals. The latter was likely the influence of his uncle, Charles Upham Shepard, who was a mineralogist and a chemist. His personality was reportedly light-hearted, and he was known to play practical jokes in his youth. He was often reminded of a familial tie to Ralph Waldo Emerson through his paternal great-grandmother’s sister (Emerson’s mother Ruth Haskins), and it was expected that Boltwood would study and succeed in line with the family legacy.

== Education and scientific background ==
He graduated with high honors in chemistry from Yale in 1892, and went on to study analytical methods of inorganic chemistry and rare earth elements for two years in Germany at the Ludwig-Maximilians-Universität München. Afterwards, he returned to Yale and earned a PhD in 1897 and became an instructor in the Sheffield Scientific School there from 1896 to 1900. His teaching and research work at Yale focused on physical chemistry, despite it being a relatively new field. Lacking resources in English for teaching the subject, he translated two books from German, Alexander Classen, "Quantitative Analysis by Electrolysis," and the other by Charles Van Deventer, "Physical Chemistry for Beginners." He was particularly handy in the lab, often improving upon methods and devices. For example, he developed a low melting point wax that found use in labs across the country and was called, "Boltwax".

From 1900 to 1906, he had a private lab in New Haven, Connecticut. He worked as a consulting chemist, analyzing ore samples for miners. This experience brought him into contact with the rare earth metals he had studied as well as uranium and thorium, elements that would become the crux of his greatest scientific contributions.

== Research and academic career ==
In 1906, Boltwood returned to Yale as an assistant professor of physics at a time when the newly discovered science of radioactivity was considered both chemistry and physics. He would eventually become the leading American scientist in the field, and be appointed chair of radiochemistry in 1910, a position that was the first of its kind. He developed a friendship with Ernest Rutherford, whose highly influential thinking played a role in much of Boltwood's work. They communicated primarily through overseas correspondence, except for a short period from 1909 to 1910 when Rutherford invited Boltwood to join him at the University of Manchester in England. Their letters from 1904-1912 were published in 1969 in the book Rutherford and Boltwood: Letters on Radioactivity, which reveals an ongoing conversation as the two scientists work to unravel details of radioactivity and the uranium decay series.

=== Radiometric dating and the age of Earth ===
Boltwood is credited as being the first to introduce a uranium-lead dating technique to determine the age of geological samples. The discovery stemmed from his investigations of the uranium decay series and conversations with Rutherford. In 1904, Rutherford gave lectures around the topic of radioactivity as a tool for geologic dating, and presented calculations based on the presence of helium as a product. He dated a sample of fergusonite at 40 million years, with the caveat that helium could escape and would therefore only provide a minimum age. The following year, Boltwood made the assertion that lead was the final decay product in the disintegration of uranium, and that Pb:U ratios increase in older geological samples. In 1907, he published results of analyzing ten mineral samples from different world locations, including a thorianite that measured 2.2 billion years old. This value was ten times greater than any previous estimated age of the Earth, and geologists did not immediately accept the validity of radioactivity as a dating method. Boltwood published a single paper on radiometric dating, instead focusing the majority of his research on the uranium decay series.

=== Uranium decay series and discovery of ionium ===
In 1904, scientists were working to piece together the series of products as a radioactive atom disintegrates, and understand which elements are related by the process. At this time, Boltwood showed that old geological samples contain a constant ratio of radium and uranium, and he set out to prove the two are connected. To do so, he attempted to determine radium's parent element by "growing" it from uranium's known product, "uranium X". His attempts were unsuccessful, and he suspected a long half-life would make it impossible to "grow" radium in a measurable amount. In 1907, he discovered a new element with a half-life of almost 100,000 years before it decays to radium, and he named it "ionium" after the ionizing action of its alpha particles. Boltwood was able to prove that ionium disintegrates to radium, and the full connection to uranium was shown in work by Frederick Soddy in 1919. Once the existence of isotopes was established in 1914, Stefanie Horovitz and Otto Hönigschmid demonstrated that ionium was actually thorium-230, the second known case of an isotope, rather than its own distinct element. However, the work of these two scientists in Vienna, as they precisely measured the atomic weight of lead from radioactive sources, also served to reinforce Boltwood's assertion that lead is the final product in the uranium decay series.

== Later career and death ==
Once Boltwood was offered a full professorship and chair of radiochemistry position at Yale in 1910, his career became more academic and he no longer actively pursued research. He was elected to both the United States National Academy of Sciences and the American Philosophical Society in 1911. He was elected to the American Academy of Arts and Sciences in 1913. In 1918, Boltwood became the director of Yale College chemical laboratory. As he took on more responsibilities at the college, he began overseeing the setup of two laboratories – Sloane Physics and Sterling Chemistry. During this time of added stress, he experienced bouts of depression and was forced to take time off to recover from a mental breakdown in 1924. He returned with renewed zeal and continued his work, but fell into periods of depression over the following years. On August 15, 1927, he took his own life in Hancock Point, Maine at the age of 57.
