= Zintl =

Zintl is a surname. Notable people with the surname include:

- Bernhard Zintl (born 1965), German pole vaulter
- Eduard Zintl (1898–1941), German chemist
