= Heinrich Hlasiwetz =

Austrian chemist (1825–1875)

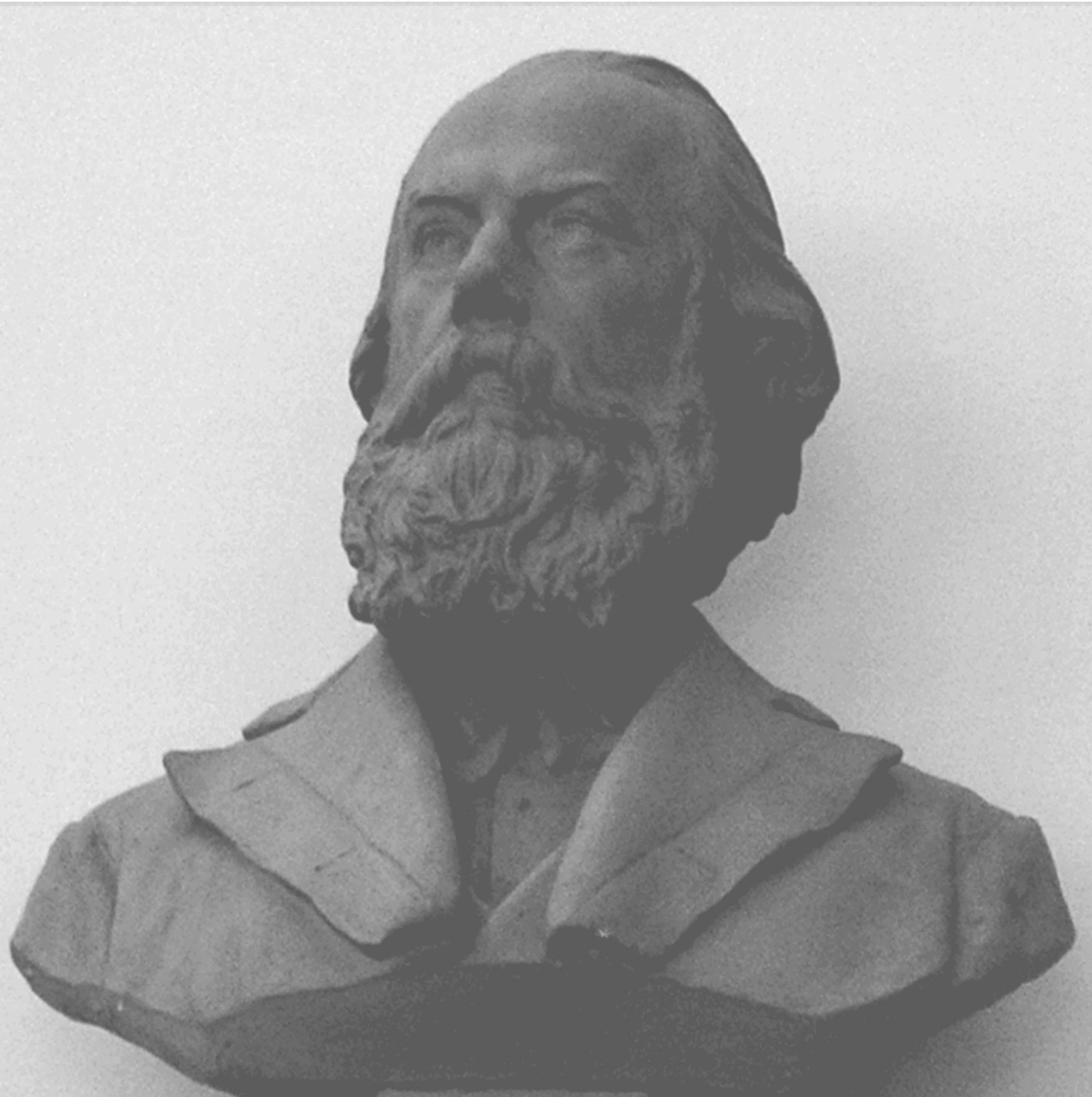
- Bust of Hlasiwetz
- Born: 7 April 1825; Reichenberg, Bohemia, Austrian Empire
- Died: 7 October 1875 (aged 50); Vienna, Austria
- Scientific career
- Doctoral students: Hugo Weidel

Heinrich Hlasiwetz (7 April 1825 – 7 October 1875) was an Austrian chemist.

== Life ==
Hlasiwetz was born in Reichenberg, Bohemia, Austrian Empire (now Liberec, Czech Republic).

Son of a pharmacist, he studied at the University of Jena, where his instructors included Johann Wolfgang Döbereiner (1780-1849), Heinrich Wilhelm Ferdinand Wackenroder and Matthias Jakob Schleiden. Later he studied under Josef Redtenbacher in Prague. In 1848 he earned the diploma of Magister Pharmacia, and during the following year received his doctorate in chemistry.

In 1849 he began work as an assistant to Friedrich Rochleder, later becoming an associate professor of chemistry at the University of Innsbruck (1854). In 1867 he became a professor at the Vienna University of Technology, where from 1869 he represented general and analytical chemistry.

During his career he largely worked with resins, tannins and protein compounds. Hlasiwetz is remembered for his chemical analysis of quercitrin, phloroglucinol, resorcinol and creosote.

== Written works ==
- Über das Quercitrin, 1859
- Über eine neue Säure aus dem Milchzucker, 1859.
