= Losonczy =

Losonczy is a Hungarian surname. Notable people with the surname include:

- Attila Losonczy (born 1974), Hungarian neuroscientist and professor
- Géza Losonczy (1917–1957), Hungarian journalist and politician
- Levente Losonczy (born 2003), Hungarian racing driver
- Thomas Losonczy (born 1953), American fencer
