= Thomas Reardon =

American computational neuroscientist and co-founder of CTRL-labs

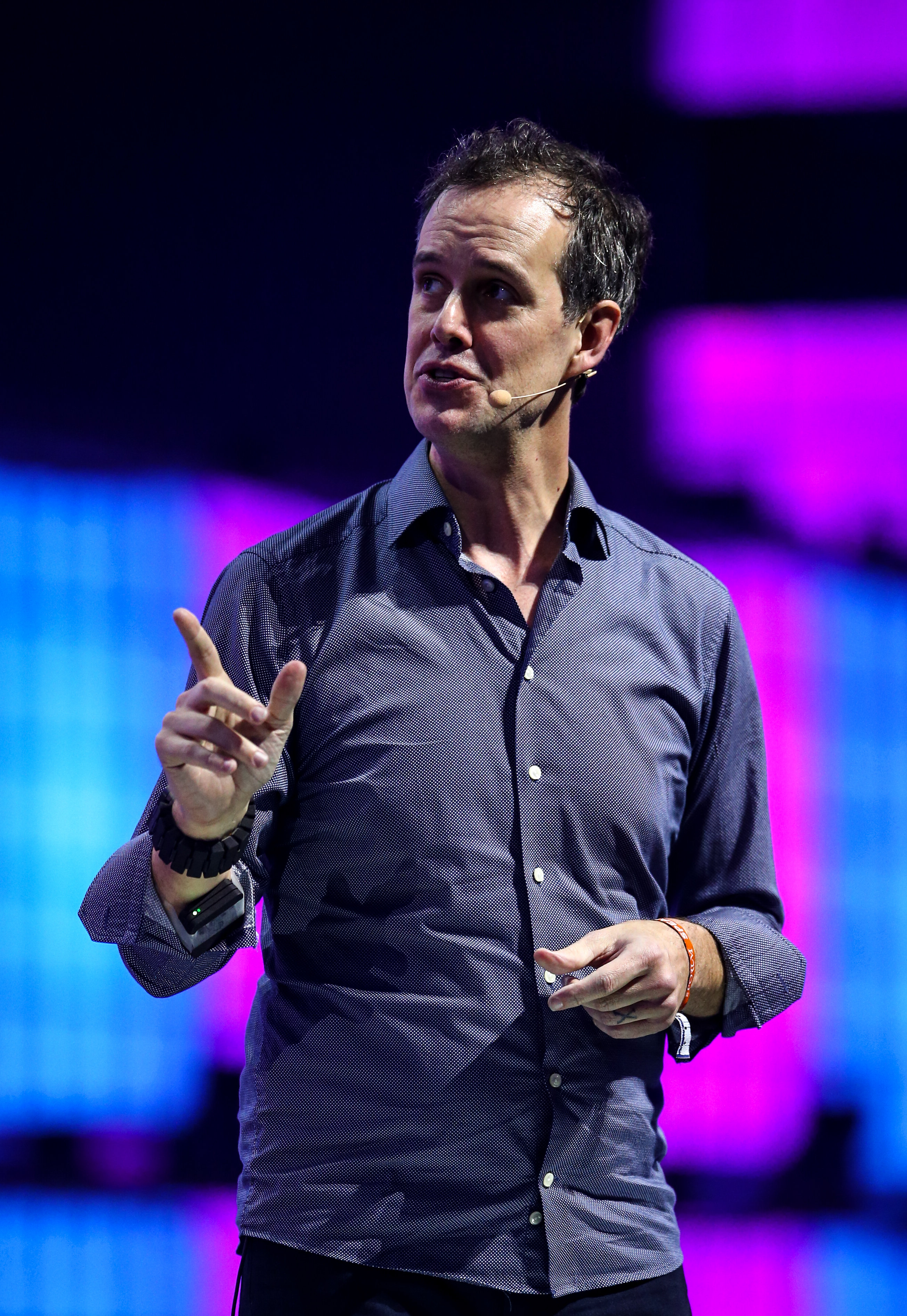
- Reardon at 2019 Web Summit
- Born: 1969 (age 56–57)
- Education: Columbia University (B.A., 2008; M.Phil, 2013; PhD, 2016); Duke University (M.S., 2010)
- Known for: CTRL-Labs; Internet Explorer; W3C
- Awards: TR35 (2003)
- Scientific career
- Fields: Information technology Computational neuroscience
- Workplaces: Columbia University
- Doctoral advisor: Thomas Jessell; Attila Losonczy

Thomas Reardon (born 1969) is an American computational neuroscientist and the CEO and co-founder of CTRL-labs. Formerly, he was a computer programmer and developer at Microsoft. He is credited with creating the project to build Microsoft's web browser, Internet Explorer, which was the world's most used browser during its peak in the early 2000s. He founded CTRL-labs in 2015 with neuroscientists from Columbia University. Following the acquisition of CTRL-labs he leads the neural interfaces group at Facebook Reality Labs.

== Early life ==
Reardon is originally from New Hampshire, from an Irish-Catholic background. He is one of 18 siblings, eight of them adopted. Described as a "math and computer prodigy," Reardon took graduate-level math and science classes at the Massachusetts Institute of Technology while in high school. He moved to North Carolina at age 16.

== Early tech career ==
While in North Carolina, Reardon co-founded a startup at age 19. After the startup's acquisition, he met Bill Gates and joined Microsoft for 10 years as a program manager on the Windows 95 and Windows 98 projects.

At one point, Reardon constituted Microsoft's entire Internet Explorer development team. He served as a program manager and architect for Internet Explorer through version 4. Notably, he delivered the first implementation of CSS in Internet Explorer 3 and came up with the idea of bundling Internet Explorer with the Microsoft Windows operating system. IE3 was the first incarnation of Explorer to seriously compete with Netscape Navigator, which until that point had been the most popular browser.

During Reardon's tenure, Internet Explorer surpassed Netscape Navigator as the most-used web browser in the late 1990s and early 2000s, in what came to be known as the First Browser War. Reardon was a founding board member of the World Wide Web Consortium (W3C) and worked with W3C and other standards agencies as Microsoft's representative to establish many of the standards and precedents that still govern the World Wide Web. Reardon was one of the earliest advocates and influencers of HTML4, CSS, and XML, designing the first commercial implementations of these languages.

In 1998, Microsoft became embroiled in antitrust litigation, United States v. Microsoft Corp., as a result of the browser war with Netscape. Reardon expressed disillusionment with Microsoft after the Netscape ordeal, ultimately deciding to leave to start a wireless networking startup called Avogadro.

Reardon later joined OpenWave, a mobile software company, where he served as general manager and then vice president, finally being appointed chief technology officer, a post he held until 2004. At OpenWave, he worked on developing the first mobile web browser. In 2003, the MIT Technology Review named Reardon one of its Top 35 Innovators Under 35, an annually published list recognizing innovators for "accomplishments that are poised to have a dramatic impact on the world as we know it".

== Higher education ==
In 2004, Reardon went back to college, studying Classics at the Columbia University School of General Studies. He credits a conversation with physicist Freeman Dyson for inspiring him to widen his worldview.

In 2008, Reardon graduated magna cum laude and Phi Beta Kappa from Columbia University with a B.A. in Literature and Classical Languages. By 2010, he had also earned an M.S. in Neurobiology from Duke University.

In 2012 Reardon gave the commencement address to the School of General Studies as part of Columbia University commencement. Reardon began the address quoting "my favorite Roman philosopher" Seneca in Latin: "What matters most is whether one is extending one's life or merely delaying one's death". He contextualized the revisionist history with the temptation of narrative fallacy: "There is a lot of pressure at events like these to connect the events in one's life with a smooth line. But rich lives, lived well, are actually quite non-linear." He again recounted the experience with Freeman Dyson, being encouraged to further explore his high school interest in Latin: "Oh, yes you must – read Tacitus."

Reardon completed a M.Phil and a Ph.D. in Neuroscience and Behavior from Columbia University in 2013 and 2016, respectively. He presently sits on the board of directors at Transportation Alternatives, and on the board of visitors at the School of General Studies and the Zuckerman Institute.

== CTRL-labs ==
The flagship device of CTRL-labs has been called an "API for the brain" by TechCrunch and a "wristband to let human beings control machines with their minds" by CNBC.

In February 2019, CTRL-labs announced raising $28 million in a Series B financing round from Google Ventures, Amazon’s Alexa Fund, Lux Capital, Spark Capital, Matrix Partners, Breyer Capital, and Fuel Capital.

VentureBeat features a series of demos for CTRL-Labs' technology.

In November 2019, CTRL-labs was acquired by Facebook in a deal reportedly between $500 million and $1 billion. The team was integrated into Facebook's AR/VR research group.

In July 2025, the scientific research underlying the wrist-worn neural interface debuted in Nature (journal).

== Publications ==
- Reardon, Thomas; Murray, Andrew; Turi, Gergely; Wirblick, Christopher; Croce, Katherine; Schnell, Matthias; Jessell, Thomas; Losonczy, Attila (17 February 2016). "Rabies Virus CVS-N2c^{ΔG} Strain Enhances Retrograde Synaptic Transfer and Neuronal Viability". Neuron. 89 (4): 711–724. doi:10.1016/j.neuron.2016.01.004. PMC 4760870. PMID 26804990.
- Kaifosh, Patrick; Reardon, Thomas R. (23 July 2025). "A generic non-invasive neuromotor interface for human-computer interaction". Nature: 1–10. doi:10.1038/s41586-025-09255-w. ISSN 1476-4687. PMC 12443603.
