= Friedrich Emich =

Austrian chemist

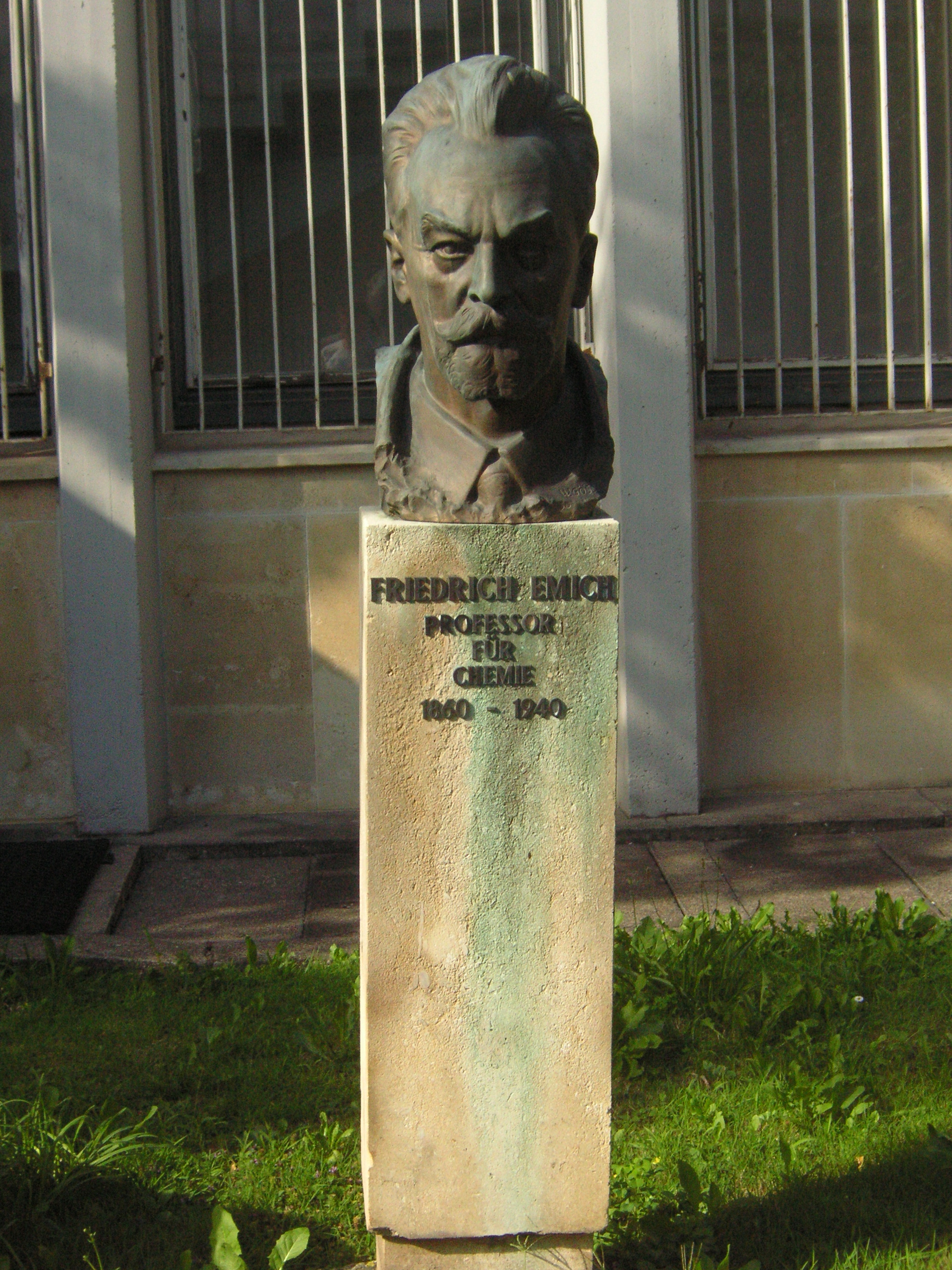
- Born: 5 September 1860; Graz, Austria-Hungary
- Died: 22 January 1940 (aged 79); Graz, Austria
- Education: Graz University of Technology
- Awards: Lieben Prize (1911)
- Scientific career
- Workplaces: Graz University of Technology

Friedrich Emich (5 September 1860 – 22 January 1940) was an Austrian chemist. Emich is recognized as the founder of microchemistry and worked at Graz University of Technology. Together with his colleague from the University of Graz, Fritz Pregl he perfected the work in small scales analysis. Fritz Pregl was awarded the Nobel Prize for Chemistry in 1923 for his work on microanalysis.

== Life ==
Emich was born in Graz in 1860. He went to school in Graz and started studying chemistry at Graz University of Technology (formerly Technische Hochschule Graz) in 1878. Emich worked as a student in the laboratory of professor Richard Maly. He received his PhD in 1884 and after teaching in a school for a short period he handed in his habilitation in 1888. He became assistant professor at Graz University of Technology in 1889 and full professor in 1894. Emich served as rector of his alma mater for four periods (1899/1900, 1907/1908, 1908/1909, 1920/21). He stayed in Graz the rest of his academic career until his retirement in 1931.

== Work ==
Emich started with work on natural products, for example bile acid. in the 20th century he changed more to research of inorganic chemistry, for example the chemistry of nitrogen oxides, the fluorides of tin and titanium and the reactions in explosive gases.

His first publication on microchemistry was in 1893 where he described a method to identify sulfur. His work focused steadily on microchemistry and in 1911 he published his book Lehrbuch der Mikrochemie (Textbook of Microchemistry). In the following years Emich was able to introduce several new methods into chemistry which were essential for working in small scales. Emich improved the quartz fiber balance and he introduced capillary pipettes to handle small amounts of liquid for analysis.

In 1911 he received the Austrian Lieben Prize for his work on microchemistry.

After the publication of his second book Mikrochemisches Praktikum in 1924 he spent considerable time teaching visitors to Graz University of Technology his new methods. After his retirement in 1931 he received the Liebig Medal. He worked in the laboratories of the university until 1937 and died in Graz in 1940.
