= Baltuška =

- Lithuanian surname
- m.: Baltuška
- f.: (unmarried): Baltuškaitė
- f.: (married): Baltuškienė

Baltuška is a Lithuanian surname.

- Andrius Baltuška, Lithuanian physicist
- Raimundas Saulius Baltuška (1937–2016), Lithuanian military figure, flotilla admiral, former commander of the Lithuanian naval forces
