= Rolf Huisgen =

German chemist (1920–2020)

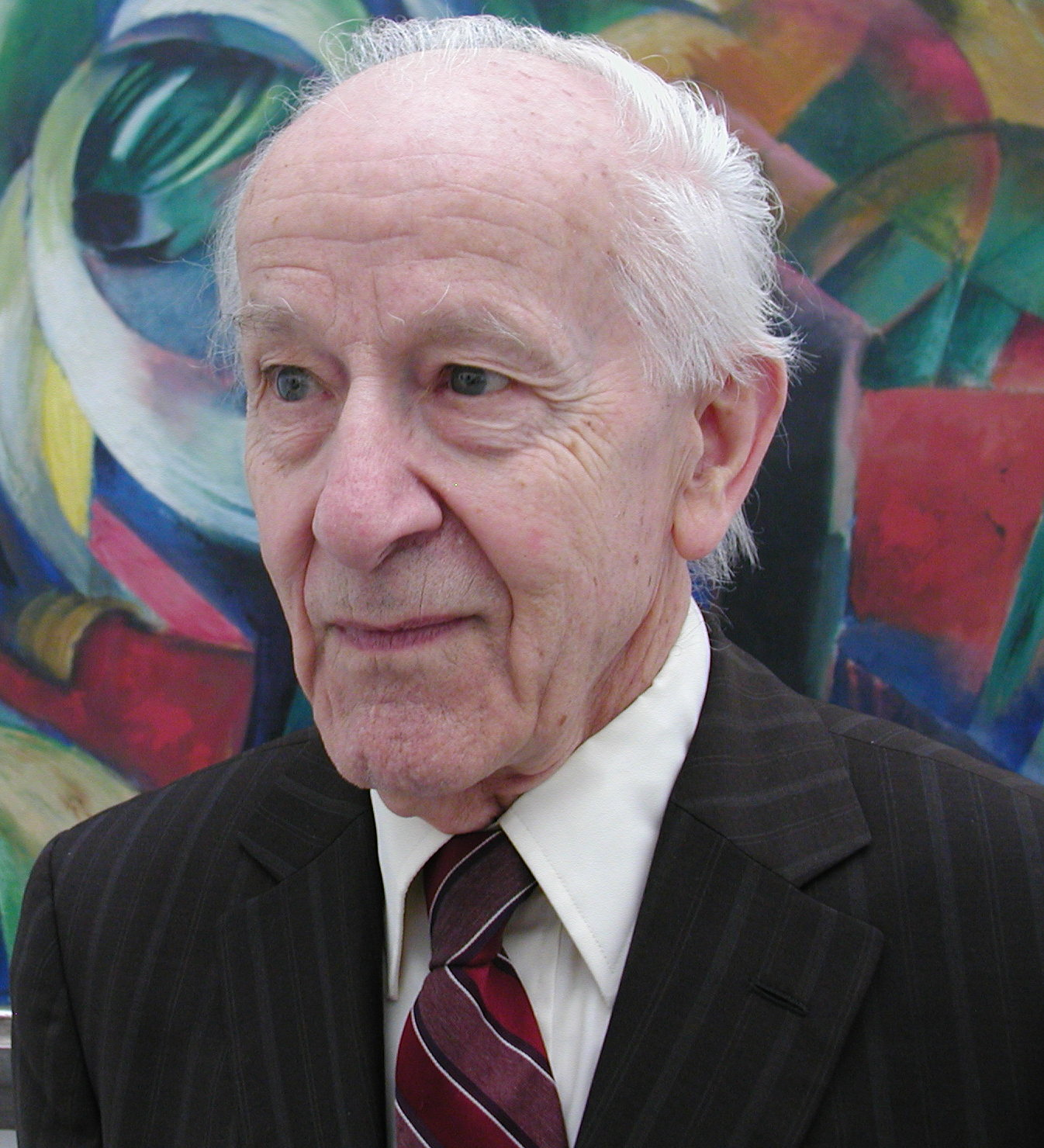
- Rolf Huisgen in 2004
- Born: 13 June 1920; Gerolstein, Rhineland-Palatinate, Germany
- Died: 26 March 2020 (aged 99); Munich, Bavaria, Germany
- Education: Ludwig-Maximilians-Universität München
- Known for: 1,3-dipolar cycloaddition reaction
- Awards: 1960 Centenary Prize; 1961 Liebig Medal; 1979 Otto Hahn Prize for Chemistry and Physics
- Scientific career
- Fields: Chemist
- Workplaces: Ludwig-Maximilians-Universität München
- Doctoral advisor: Heinrich Otto Wieland

Rolf Huisgen (German: ['huːzgɛn]; 13 June 1920 – 26 March 2020) was a German chemist. His importance in synthetic organic chemistry extends to the enormous influence he had in post-war chemistry departments in Germany and Austria, due to many of his habilitants becoming professors. His major achievement was the development of the 1,3-dipolar cycloaddition reaction, also called the Huisgen cycloaddition.

== Life ==
Huisgen was born in Gerolstein in Rhineland-Palatinate and studied at the Ludwig-Maximilians-Universität München under the supervision of Heinrich Otto Wieland. He completed his Ph.D. in 1943 with a thesis about a strychnine alkaloid. He completed his habilitation in 1947, and was appointed professor at the University of Tübingen in 1949. He returned to the Ludwig-Maximilians-Universität München in 1952, succeeding Wieland, and he remained dedicated to research long after attaining emeritus status there in 1988.

One of his major achievements was the development of the 1,3-dipolar cycloaddition reaction, also known as the Huisgen cycloaddition or Huisgen reaction. The Huisgen reaction is of paramount importance to the synthesis of heterocyclic compounds, such as vitamins, alkaloids and antibiotics.

Huisgen was a member of the American Academy of Arts and Sciences from 1960. He was also a member of the German National Academy of Sciences Leopoldina and an Honorary Fellow of the Royal Society of Chemistry. He was an Honorary Member of the Gesellschaft Deutscher Chemiker and the Chemical Society of Japan. He was awarded the Liebig Medal in 1961, the Lavoisier Medal from the Société Chimique de France in 1965, and the Adolfo Quilico Medal from the Società Chimica Italiana in 1987, among others. He was elected to the National Academy of Sciences in 1989. He received several honorary doctorates, including from the Free University of Berlin in 2010.

Sixteen of his students became professors in Germany alone, including Reinhard Brückner, Johann Gasteiger, Bernd Giese, Herbert Mayr, Johann Mulzer, Hans-Ulrich Reissig, Jürgen Sauer and Ivar Karl Ugi.

== Personal life ==
His daughter, mathematician Birge Huisgen-Zimmermann, was born in 1946. He died in Munich on 26 March 2020, aged 99.

== Publications ==
- Huisgen, Rolf; Grashey, Rudolf; Sauer, Jürgen (1964). "Cycloaddition reactions of alkenes". The Alkenes: Vol. 1 (1964). Chichester, UK: John Wiley & Sons, Ltd. pp. 739–953. doi:10.1002/9780470771044.ch11. ISBN 978-0-470-77104-4.
- Huisgen, Rolf (7 July 1963). "1.3-Dipolare Cycloadditionen Rückschau und Ausblick". Angewandte Chemie (in German). 75 (13). Wiley: 604–637. Bibcode:1963AngCh..75..604H. doi:10.1002/ange.19630751304. ISSN 0044-8249.
- Huisgen, Rolf (1994). The adventure playground of mechanisms and novel reactions. Washington, DC: American Chemical Society. ISBN 978-0-8412-1832-1. OCLC 30399911.

== Literature ==
- Rüchardt, Christoph; Sauer, Jürgen; Sustmann, Reiner (2005). "Rolf Huisgen: Some Highlights of His Contributions to Organic Chemistry". Helvetica Chimica Acta. 88 (6): 1154. doi:10.1002/hlca.200590098.
- Houk, Kendall N. (2010). "Rolf Huisgen's Profound Adventures in Chemistry". Helvetica Chimica Acta. 93 (7): 1241–1260. doi:10.1002/hlca.201000209.
