= Lieben Prize =

Austrian science and technology award

The Ignaz Lieben Prize, named after the Austrian banker Ignaz Lieben, is an annual Austrian award made by the Austrian Academy of Sciences to young scientists working in the fields of molecular biology, chemistry, or physics.

== Biography ==
The Ignaz Lieben Prize has been called the Austrian Nobel Prize. It is similar in intent but somewhat older than the Nobel Prize. The Austrian merchant Ignaz L. Lieben, whose family supported many philanthropic activities, had stipulated in his testament that 6,000 florins should be used “for the common good”. In 1863 this money was given to the Austrian Imperial Academy of Sciences, and the Ignaz L. Lieben Prize was instituted. Every three years, the sum of 900 florins was to be given to an Austrian scientist in the field of chemistry, physics, or physiology. This sum corresponded to roughly 40 per cent of the annual income of a university professor.

From 1900 on, the prize was offered on a yearly basis. The endowment was twice increased by the Lieben family. When the endowment had lost its value due to inflation after World War I, the family transferred the necessary sum yearly to the Austrian Academy of Sciences. But since the family was persecuted by the National Socialists, the prize was discontinued after the German Anschluss of Austria in 1938.

Richard Lieben (1842–1919), the younger son of Ignaz Lieben, financed the Richard Lieben Prize in Mathematics, which was awarded every three years from 1912 to 1921, and one final time in 1928, before being discontinued.

In 2004 the Lieben prize was reinstated, with support from Isabel Bader and Alfred Bader (who was able to flee from Austria to Great Britain at the age of fourteen in 1938). Now, the award amounts to US Dollar 36,000, and it is offered yearly to young scientists who work in Austria, Bosnia-Herzegovina, Croatia, the Czech Republic, Hungary, Slovakia or Slovenia (i.e., in one of the countries that were part of the Austro-Hungarian Empire a hundred years ago), and who work in the fields of molecular biology, chemistry, or physics.

== Laureates ==
Source (1865–1937; 2004–2007): Ignaz Lieben Gesellschaft:

- 2024 Edit Mátyus
- 2023 Hannes Pichler
- 2022 Dennis Kurzbach
- 2021 Kristin Tessmar-Raible
- 2020 Norbert Werner
- 2019 Gašper Tkačik
- 2018 Nuno Maulide
- 2017 Iva Tolić
- 2016 Illés Farkas
- 2015 Francesca Ferlaino
- 2014 Jana Roithová
- 2013 Barbara Kraus
- 2012 Michael Sixt
- 2011 Mihály Kovács
- 2010 Robert Kralovics
- 2009 Frank Verstraete
- 2008 Csaba Pal
- 2007 Markus Aspelmeyer
- 2006 Andrius Baltuska
- 2005 Ronald Micura
- 2004 Zoltan Nusser
- Not awarded 1938–2003
- 1937 Marietta Blau and Hertha Wambacher
- 1936 Franz Lippay and Richard Rössler
- 1935 Armin Dadieu
- 1934 Eduard Haschek
- 1933 Ferdinand Scheminzky
- 1932 Georg Koller
- 1931 Karl Höfler
- 1930 Wolf Johannes Müller
- 1929 Karl Przibram
- 1927 Otto Porsch and Gustav Klein
- 1926 Adolf Franke
- 1925 Lise Meitner
- 1924 Otto Loewi and Ernst Peter Pick
- 1923 Otto von Fürth
- 1922 Karl Wilhelm Friedrich Kohlrausch
- 1921 Karl von Frisch
- 1920 Ernst Späth
- 1919 Victor Franz Hess
- 1918 Eugen Steinach
- 1917 Wilhelm Schlenk
- 1916 Friedrich Adolf Paneth
- 1915 Wilhelm Trendelenburg
- 1914 Fritz Pregl
- 1913 Stefan Meyer
- 1912 Oswald Richter
- 1911 Friedrich Emich
- 1910 Felix Ehrenhaft
- 1909 Eugen Steinach
- 1908 Paul Friedlaender
- 1907 Hans Benndorf
- 1906 Arnold Durig
- 1905 Rudolf Wegscheider and Hans Leopold Meyer
- 1904 Franz Schwab
- 1903 Josef Schaffer
- 1902 Josef Herzig
- 1901 Josef Liznar
- 1900 Theodor Beer and Oskar Zoth
- 1898 Konrad Natterer
- 1895 Josef Maria Eder and Eduard Valenta
- 1892 Guido Goldschmiedt
- 1889 Sigmund Ritter Exner von Ewarten
- 1886 Zdenko Hans Skraup
- 1883 Victor Ritter Ebner von Rofenstein
- 1880 Hugo Weidel
- 1877 Sigmund Ritter Exner von Ewarten
- 1874 Eduard Linnemann
- 1871 Leander Ditscheiner
- 1868 Eduard Linnemann and Karl von Than
- 1865 Josef Stefan

=== Richard Lieben Prize ===
- 1912 Josip Plemelj
- 1915 Gustav Herglotz
- 1918 Wilhelm Gross
- 1921 Hans Hahn and Johann Radon
- 1928 Karl Menger

== See also ==
- List of biology awards
- List of chemistry awards
- List of physics awards
