= Oskar Zoth =

Austrian physiologist (1864–1933)

- Born: 28 August 1864; Padua, Austrian Empire
- Died: 30 November 1933 (aged 69); Graz, Austria
- Education: University of Graz
- Awards: Lieben Prize (1900)

Oskar Karl Maria Zoth (28 August 1864, Padua – 30 November 1933, Graz) was an Austrian physiologist.

In 1888 he received his medical doctorate from the University of Graz, where in 1896 he qualified as a lecturer for physiology. In 1898 he became an associate professor, and three years later, was a named a full professor at the University of Innsbruck. In 1904 he returned as a professor to the University of Graz. In 1900 he was a recipient of the Lieben Prize.

In an 1894 experiment he injected himself with a liquid extraction of bulls' testicles, then tested his muscle strength with a "Mosso ergograph". In regards to this testing, he stated "the training of athletes offers an opportunity for further research in this area and for a practical assessment of our experimental results".

== Selected writings ==
- Die Wirkungen der Augenmuskeln und die Erscheinungen bei Lähmungen derselben, 1897 – The effects of eye muscles and symptoms for paralysis.
- Pathologische Anatomie des Sehnerveneintrittes (with Anton Elschnig), 1900 – Pathological anatomy of optic nerve occurrences.
- Über die natur der mischfarben auf grund der undulationshypothese, 1914 – Concerning the nature of mixing colors on the basis of the undulation hypothesis.
- Farbenbezeichnungen und -benennungen, 1925 – Color designation.
- Ergographie und ergometrie, 1936 – Ergography and ergometry.
