= Josef Goubeau =

German chemist (1901–1990)

Josef Goubeau (31 March 1901 – 18 October 1990) was a German chemist.

== Life and work ==
Goubeau was born in Augsburg, Germany.

He studied chemistry at the Ludwig-Maximilians-Universität München starting from 1921 and attained a doctorate there 1926 on the atomic weight regulation of the potassiumin the group of Otto Hönigschmid under the supervision of Eduard Zintl. Subsequently, he worked at the University of Freiburg, the mountain academy Clausthal-Zellerfeld, where he made his postdoctoral lecture qualification in 1935 on the Raman effect in analytical chemistry. Starting from 1940, he became a university teacher at the University of Göttingen, and from 1951 professor at the Technische Hochschule Stuttgart. His focus of activity was the inorganic synthetic chemistry and spectroscopy of compounds of boron, silicon and phosphorus. Most important was his fundamental work about vibrational spectroscopy and to force constants as measure of the strength of chemical bonds.

Goubeau died on 18 October 1990 in Stuttgart, at the age of 89.

== Honours ==
- Doctor HC of Clausthal University of Technology and the Ludwig-Maximilians-Universität München
- Alfred Stock Memorial Prize of the Society of German Chemists
- Member of the Academy of Sciences Leopoldina
