= Leander Ditscheiner =

Austrian physicist and mathematician

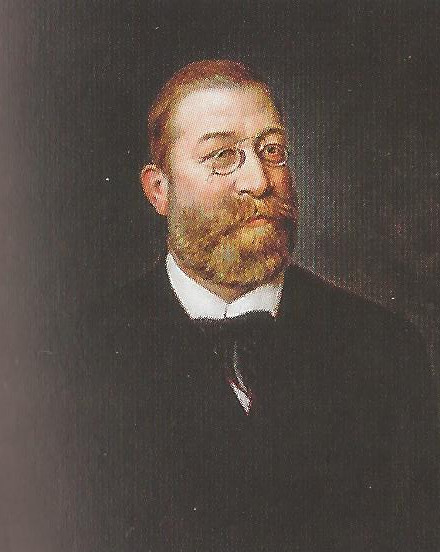
- 1893 portrait by Wenzel Ottokar Noltsch
- Born: 4 January 1839; Vienna, Austrian Empire
- Died: 1 February 1905 (aged 66); Vienna, Austria-Hungary
- Awards: Lieben Prize (1871)

Signature
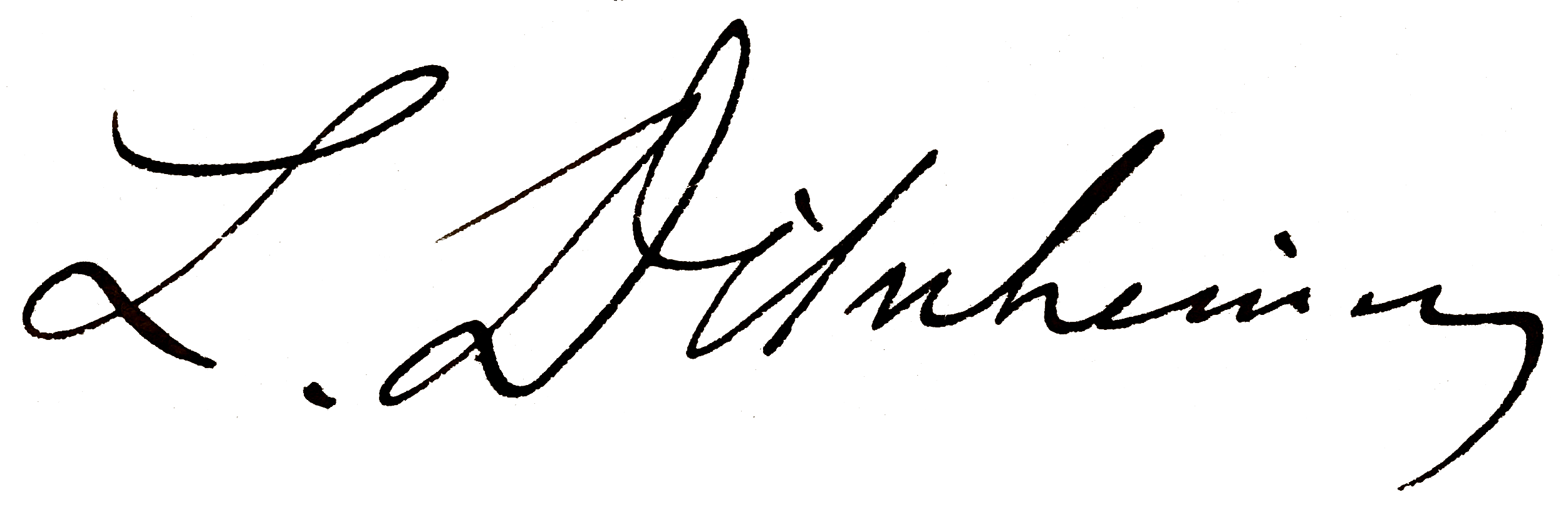

Leander Ditscheiner (4 January 1839 – 1 February 1905) was an Austrian physicist and mathematician, best known for his research on birefringence.

== Life and work ==
Leander Ditscheiner was born 1839 in Vienna. He studied at the University of Vienna and later at the Heidelberg University. He received his Ph.D. in 1857 and became lecturer at the TU Wien in 1866. In the later years he became assistant professor and full professor in 1883.
