= Csaba Pal =

Hungarian biologist (born 1975)

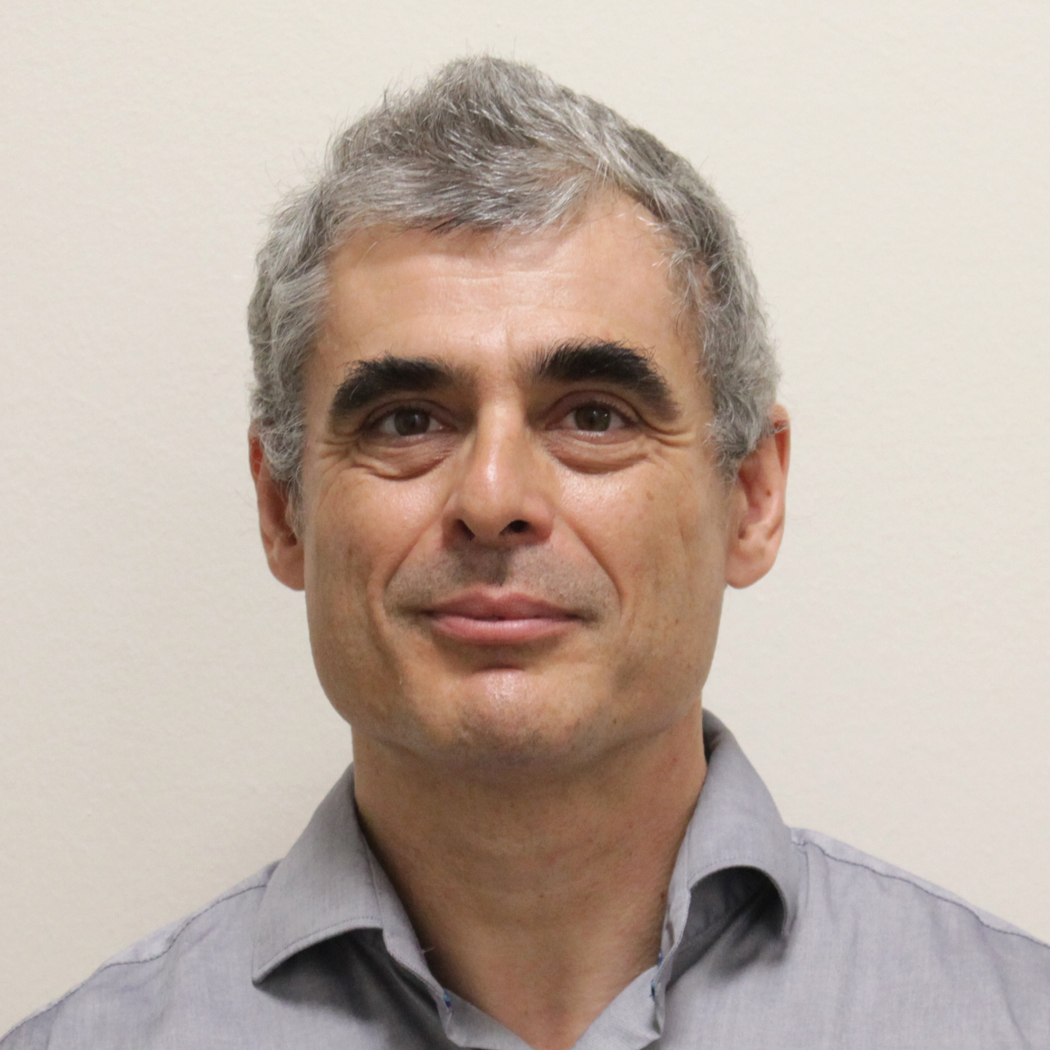
- Born: March 27, 1975 (age 51); Budapest, Hungary
- Education: Eötvös Loránd Tudományegyetem (PhD)
- Alma mater: Hungarian Academy of Sciences (D.Sc.)
- Occupation: Biologist
- Employer: Biological Research Centre
- Awards: Ignaz Lieben Award (2009); Szent-Györgyi Talents Award (2014); Bolyai Prize (2015); Member of the Academia Europaea(2016); EMBO Member (2017); Member of the Federation of European Microbiological Societies(FEMS)
- Website: http://group.szbk.u-szeged.hu/sysbiol/pal-csaba-lab-index.html

Csaba Pal (Hungarian: Pál [ˈpaːl] Csaba [ˈt͡ʃɒbɒ]; born March 27, 1975) is a Hungarian biologist at the Biological Research Centre (BRC) in Szeged Hungary. His laboratory is part of the Synthetic and Systems Biology Unit at BRC. His research is at the interface of evolution, antibiotic resistance and genome engineering and has published over 80 scientific publications in these areas.

== Education ==
Csaba Pal completed his master's in biology at Eötvös Loránd University, Budapest, in 1998. Four years later he was awarded a Doctor of Philosophy degree from the Eötvös Loránd University, Budapest in 2002. In 2018 he received a Doctor of Science degree from the Hungarian Academy of Sciences. Csaba Pal spent several years abroad with scholarships. He had the opportunity to research in Bath, Oxford, Heidelberg and Italy. Prior to his return to Hungary in 2008, he worked as a visiting scientist at the University of Trento. In 2023 Csaba Pál become a Corresponding member of the Hungarian Academy of Sciences.

== Career and research ==
Csaba Pal works on fundamental and applied problems in the evolution of genome networks and antibiotic resistance. To achieve these goals, he develops methods in systems biology, computational metabolic modelling and genome engineering.

== Genome evolution ==
In 2001, Csaba Pal and colleagues demonstrated that highly expressed genes in yeast evolve slowly. Later, they argued that evolutionary rate of a protein is predominantly influenced by its expression level rather than functional importance. This research has contributed to a paradigmatic shift in the field of protein evolution. Balazs Papp, Csaba Pal, and Laurence Hurst studied molecular mechanisms underlying dosage sensitivity. They specifically tested what is now known as the dosage balance hypothesis. The hypothesis offers a synthesis on seemingly unrelated problems such as the evolution of dominance, gene duplicability and co-evolution of protein complexsubunits. In 2007, Pal and colleagues demonstrated that antagonistic co-evolution with parasites has a large impact on the evolution of bacterial mutation rate. This paper showed how biotic interactions shape mutation rate evolution.

More recently, the Pal lab explored the consequences of compensatory adaptation on gene content evolution. It is well known that while core cellular processes are generally conserved during evolution, the underlying genes differ somewhat between related species. They demonstrated that gene loss initiates adaptive genomic changes that rapidly restores fitness, but this process has substantial pleiotropic effects on cellular physiology and evolvability upon environmental change.

== Network evolution ==
The Pal lab has also contributed to the nascent field of evolutionary systems biology. Their research focused on understanding the extent to which evolution is predictable at the molecular level. Using genome-scale metabolic network modelling combined with experimental tools they studied key issues in evolution, such as mutational robustness, horizontal gene transfer, genome reduction, epistasis, promiscuous enzyme reactions, and complex adaptations.

== Antibiotic resistance ==
Csaba Pal's laboratory currently studies the problem of antibiotic resistance. By combining laboratory evolution, genome sequencing, and functional analysis, they charted the map of evolutionary trade-offs between antibiotics. They found that multidrug resistance mutations in bacteria simultaneously enhance sensitivity to many other unrelated drugs (collateral sensitivity), and explored the underlying molecular mechanisms.

== Genome engineering ==
Finally, the Pal lab is an advocate of the emerging field of evolutionary genome engineering. Genome engineering enables the modification of specific genomic locations in a directed and combinatorial manner, and allow studying central evolutionary issues in which natural genetic variation is limited or biased. However, current tools have been optimized for a few laboratory model strains, lead to the accumulation of numerous undesired, off-target modifications, and demand extensive modification of the host genome prior to large-scale editing. The Pal laboratory presented a simple, all-in-one solution. The method is unique as it allows systematic comparison of mutational effects and epistasis across a wide range of bacterial species.

== Awards and honours ==
Csaba Pal received several domestic and international awards, including the Ignaz Lieben Award (2009), Szent-Györgyi Talents Award (2014), and the Bolyai Prize (2015). In 2016, Csaba Pal became member of Academia Europaea. In 2017 he was selected as EMBO (European Molecular Biology Organization) member. and in 2018, became a member of the FEMS. (Federation of European Microbiological Societies) In 2021 Csaba received and Academic Award and in 2023 he was elected as Corresponding member of the Hungarian Academy of Sciences
