= Carbonyl sulfide =

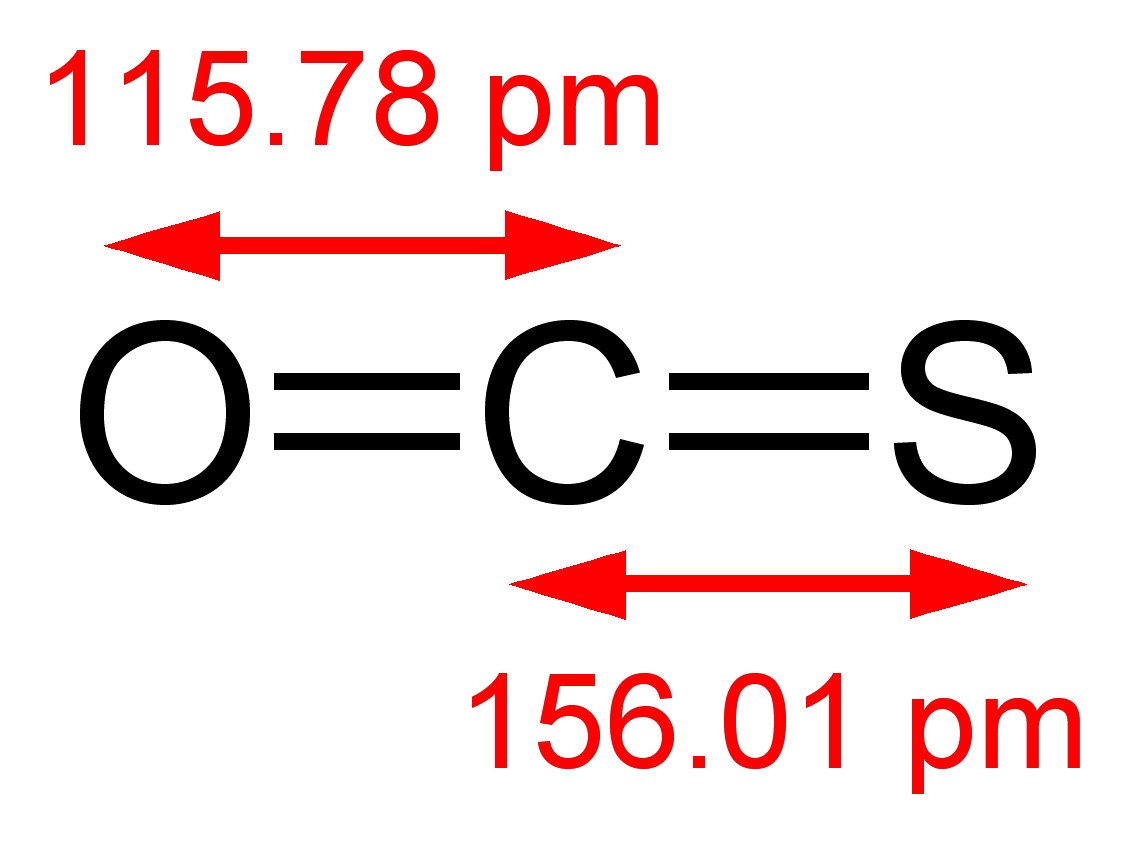
- Carbonyl sulfide

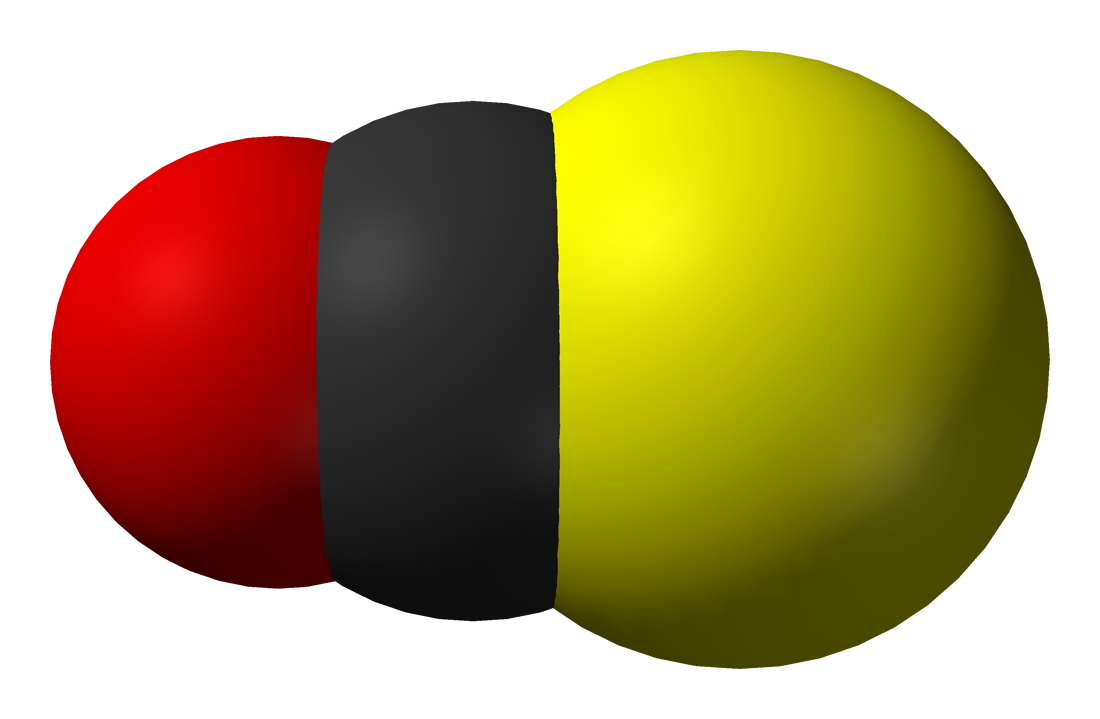
- Space-filling 3D model of carbonyl sulfide

Names
- IUPAC names Carbonyl sulfide Oxidosulfidocarbon
- Systematic IUPAC name Thioxomethanone

Identifiers
CAS Number	463-58-1
3D model (JSmol)	Interactive image
ChEBI	CHEBI:16573
ChemSpider	9644
ECHA InfoCard	100.006.674
EC Number	207-340-0
KEGG	C07331
PubChem CID	10039
UNII	871UI0ET21
UN number	2204
CompTox Dashboard (EPA)	DTXSID6023949
- InChI: InChI=1S/COS/c2-1-3 Key: JJWKPURADFRFRB-UHFFFAOYSA-N; InChI=1/COS/c2-1-3 Key: JJWKPURADFRFRB-UHFFFAOYAF
- SMILES: O=C=S

Properties
Chemical formula	COS
Molar mass	60.075 g/mol
Appearance	colorless gas
Odor	sulfide-like
Density	2.51 g/L
Melting point	−138.8 °C (−217.8 °F; 134.3 K)
Boiling point	−50.2 °C (−58.4 °F; 223.0 K)
Critical point (T, P)	101.85 °C (215.3 °F; 375.0 K), 58.03 standard atmospheres (5,879.9 kPa; 852.8 psi)
Solubility in water	0.376 g/100 mL (0 °C); 0.125 g/100 mL (25 °C)
Solubility	very soluble in KOH, CS_{2} soluble in alcohol, toluene
Magnetic susceptibility (χ)	−32.4×10^{−6} cm^{3}/mol
Dipole moment	0.65 D

Thermochemistry
Heat capacity (C)	41.5 J/(mol⋅K)
Std molar entropy (S^{⦵}_{298})	231.5 J/(mol⋅K)
Std enthalpy of formation (Δ_{f}H^{⦵}_{298})	−141.8 kJ/mol

Hazards
- GHS labelling
Pictograms	(GHS02: Flammable) (GHS06: Toxic) (GHS07: Exclamation mark)
Signal word	Danger
Hazard statements	H220, H315, H319, H331, H335
Precautionary statements	P210, P261, P264, P271, P280, P302+P352, P304+P340, P305+P351+P338, P311, P312, P321, P332+P313, P337+P313, P362, P377, P381, P403, P403+P233, P405, P410+P403, P501
NFPA 704 (fire diamond)	3 4 1
Explosive limits	12–29%
Safety data sheet (SDS)	Carbonyl sulfide MSDS

Related compounds
Related compounds	Carbon dioxide Carbon disulfide Carbonyl selenide
- Except where otherwise noted, data are given for materials in their standard state (at 25 °C [77 °F], 100 kPa). verify (what is ?) Infobox references

Carbonyl sulfide is the chemical compound with the linear formula O=C=S. It is a colorless flammable gas with an unpleasant odor. It is a linear molecule consisting of a carbonyl double bonded to a sulfur atom. Carbonyl sulfide can be considered to be intermediate between carbon dioxide and carbon disulfide, both of which are valence isoelectronic with it.

== Occurrence ==
Carbonyl sulfide is the most abundant sulfur compound naturally present in the atmosphere, at 0.5±0.05 ppb, because it is emitted from oceans, volcanoes and deep sea vents. As such, it is a significant compound in the global sulfur cycle. Measurements on the Antarctica ice cores and from air trapped in snow above glaciers (firn air) have provided a detailed picture of OCS concentrations from 1640 to the present day and allow an understanding of the relative importance of anthropogenic and non-anthropogenic sources of this gas to the atmosphere. Some carbonyl sulfide that is transported into the stratospheric sulfate layer is oxidized to sulfuric acid. Sulfuric acid forms particulate which affects energy balance due to light scattering. The long atmospheric lifetime of COS makes it the major source of stratospheric sulfate, though sulfur dioxide from volcanic activity can be significant too. Carbonyl sulfide is also removed from the atmosphere by terrestrial vegetation by enzymes associated with the uptake of carbon dioxide during photosynthesis, and by hydrolysis in ocean waters. Loss processes, such as these, limit the persistence (or lifetime) of a molecule of COS in the atmosphere to a few years.

The largest man-made sources of carbonyl sulfide release include its primary use as a chemical intermediate and as a byproduct of carbon disulfide production; however, it is also released from automobiles and their tire wear, coal-fired power plants, coking ovens, biomass combustion, fish processing, combustion of refuse and plastics, petroleum manufacture, and manufacture of synthetic fibers, starch, and rubber. The average total worldwide release of carbonyl sulfide to the atmosphere has been estimated at about 3 million tons per year, of which less than one third was related to human activity. It is also a significant sulfur-containing impurity in many fuel gases such as synthesis gas, which are produced from sulfur-containing feedstocks.

Carbonyl sulfide is present in foodstuffs, such as cheese and prepared vegetables of the cabbage family. Traces of COS are naturally present in grains and seeds in the range of 0.05–0.1 mg/kg.

Carbonyl sulfide has been observed in the interstellar medium (see also List of molecules in interstellar space), in comet 67P and in the atmosphere of Venus, where, because of the difficulty of producing COS inorganically, it is considered a possible indicator of life.

== Reactions and applications ==
Carbonyl sulfide is used as an intermediate in the production of thiocarbamate herbicides.

The hydrolysis of carbonyl sulfide is promoted by chromium-based catalysts:

COS + H_{2}O → CO_{2} + H_{2}S

This conversion is catalyzed in solution by carbonic anhydrase enzymes in plants and mammals. Because of this chemistry, the release of carbonyl sulfide from small organic molecules has been identified as a strategy for delivering hydrogen sulfide, which is gaseous signaling molecule.

This compound is found to catalyze the formation of peptides from amino acids. This finding is an extension of the Miller–Urey experiment, and it is suggested that carbonyl sulfide played a significant role in the origin of life.

In ecosystem science, are increasingly being used to describe the rate of photosynthesis.

== Synthesis ==
Carbonyl sulfide was first described in 1841, but was apparently mischaracterized as a mixture of carbon dioxide and hydrogen sulfide. Carl von Than first characterized the substance in 1867. It forms when carbon monoxide reacts with molten sulfur:

CO + 1/8 S_{8} → COS

This reaction reverses above 1200 K (930 °C; 1700 °F).

A laboratory synthesis entails the reaction potassium thiocyanate and sulfuric acid:

KSCN + 2 H_{2}SO_{4} + H_{2}O → KHSO_{4} + NH_{4}HSO_{4} + COS

The resulting gas contains significant amounts of byproducts and requires purification.

Hydrolysis of isothiocyanates in hydrochloric acid solution also affords COS.

== Toxicity ==
Carbonyl sulfide has the "rotten egg" odor characteristic of sulfides, although some sources suggest that the associated odor is due to impurities, and not present in the pure compound. The detectability threshold is estimated at 135μg/m$^3$.

As of 1994, limited information existed on the acute toxicity of carbonyl sulfide in humans and in animals. High concentrations (above 1000 ppm) can cause sudden collapse, convulsions, and death from respiratory paralysis. Occasional fatalities have been reported, practically without local irritation or olfactory warning. In tests with rats, 50% animals died when exposed to 1400 ppm of COS for 90 minutes, or at 3000 ppm for 9 minutes. Limited studies with laboratory animals also suggest that continued inhalation of low concentrations (around 50 ppm for up to 12 weeks) does not affect the lungs or the heart.

Carbonyl sulfide is a potential alternative fumigant to methyl bromide and phosphine. In some cases, however, residues on the grain result in flavours that are unacceptable to consumers, such as in barley used for brewing.
