= Guido Goldschmiedt =

Austrian chemist (1850–1915)

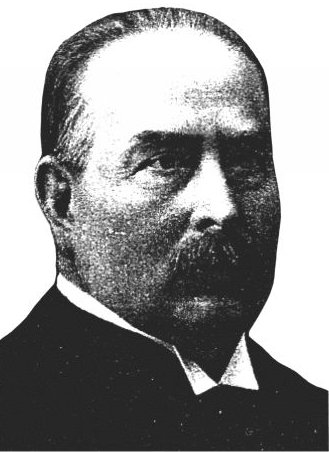
- Guido Goldschmiedt
- Born: 29 May 1850; Trieste, Austrian Empire
- Died: 6 August 1915 (aged 65); Gainfarn, Austria
- Education: University of Heidelberg
- Known for: Determination of the structure of papaverine
- Awards: Lieben Prize (1892)
- Scientific career
- Workplaces: University of Prague; University of Vienna
- Doctoral advisor: Robert Wilhelm Bunsen
- Doctoral students: Walter Fuchs, Otto Hönigschmid

Guido Goldschmiedt (29 May 1850 – 6 August 1915) was an Austrian chemist. During his career, he collaborated with Robert Wilhelm Bunsen at the University of Heidelberg and Adolf von Baeyer at the University of Strasbourg. In 1891, he became full professor at the University of Vienna and later at the University of Prague. His most remarkable results were establishing the structure of several natural compounds including papaverine and ellagic acid.

== Life ==
Goldschmiedt was born in Trieste, Austrian Empire. He started studying economics at the business school in Frankfurt, but then started attending science lectures in other educational institutions. In 1869, he went back to Vienna, where part of his family lived, and studied chemistry at the University of Vienna. There he attended lectures of Josef Redtenbacher and Franz Cölestin Schneider – the most prominent chemists of the time in Vienna. In 1871, he moved to the University of Heidelberg, Germany. There he received his PhD for work with Robert Wilhelm Bunsen and his assistant Blum in the field of inorganic analytical chemistry of minerals. For a postdoctoral position, he joined the laboratory of Adolf von Baeyer at the University of Strasbourg. Goldschmiedt worked in the field of organic chemistry for two years, but he also studied mineralogy and crystallography with Paul Heinrich von Groth. During that time, Emil Fischer and Franz S. Exner also worked with Baeyer in Strasbourg. For Goldschmiedt, the time in Strasbourg ended abruptly because he joined the group of Schneiders at the University of Vienna. After his habilitation in 1875, he was sent as official observer to the world fair in Philadelphia in 1876. After visiting California, he went back to Vienna and married in 1886. It took until 1890 for him to become assistant professor at University of Vienna, but only one year later he became full professor. In 1891, Goldschmiedt moved to the German Charles-Ferdinand University in Prague and worked there for 20 years. In the meantime, he received the Lieben Prize in 1892 and became a member of the Vorstand of Deutschen Chemischen Gesellschaft in 1900 and 1901. In 1911, Goldschmiedt succeeded Zdenko Hans Skraup at the University of Vienna and was mostly involved in administrative tasks, such as supervising the construction of the laboratory building and reorganization of the institute. Starting from 1914, his health deteriorated slowly but steadily, resulting in his eventual death on 6 August 1915.

== Work ==
Papaverine

The starting point of Goldschmiedt's research at the University of Strasbourg was synthesis of diphenyl trichloroethane, starting from bromal (CBr_{3}CHO) and benzene and following by reduction with hot zinc forming stilbene. In Vienna, his focus changed to natural-product chemistry of plants. He found that the relations between erucic acid, brassidinic acid and behenic acid correspond to the relationship in the three fatty acids oleic acid, elaidic acid and stearic acid. Goldschmiedt also improved the method of Victor Meyer to determine, through vapor density, the molecular mass of compounds with low boiling point. The mineral indralite and the mercury-containing stupp (stupp is a mixture of mercury, dust, soot and unreacted ore produced in the mercury smelting process) produced from it became the starting point for his research of polycyclic aromatic hydrocarbons, especially the two compounds idryle and pyrene. This research took most of his time between 1877 and 1883. In the following five years, Goldschmiedt focused on the determination of the structure of papaverine – a compound found in poppy seed and opium. With his 9th publication on that topic in 1889, he concluded that the structure of papaverine had been solved. At the University of Prague, Goldschmiedt had to perform analysis of the drinking water in Bohemia that slowed his research on other fields. Consequently, the determination of the structure of scutellarin took him many years: after the first publication on that topic in 1901, only in 1910 he managed to obtain enough starting material for more detailed studies. In Prague, he also studied glucuronolactone and ratanhine – a substance found in hardwood Ferreira spectabilis (Sucupira amarela). This substance had been in storage since the first tests by a Ph.D. student of Rochleder in 1868. Although only a small amount was available, Goldschmiedt succeeded to determine that the substance was methyltyrosine.
