= Birge Huisgen-Zimmermann =

American mathematician

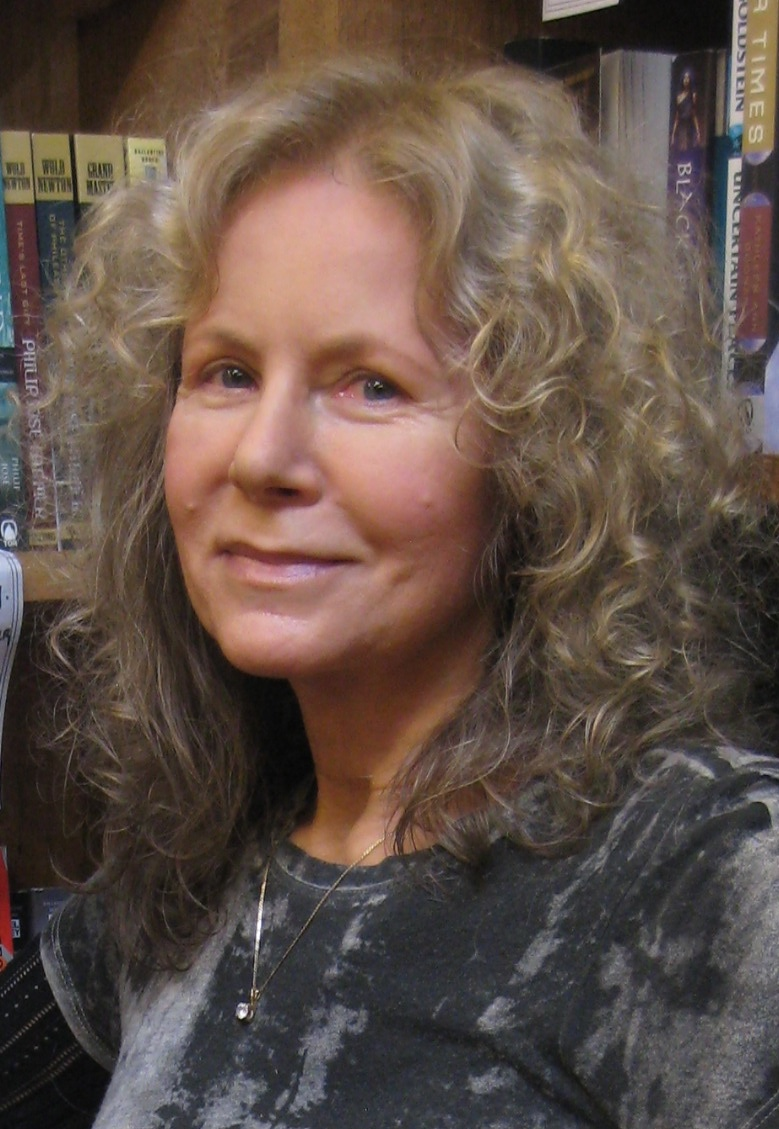
- Huisgen-Zimmermann Portrait
- Citizenship: Germany
- Education: Ludwig-Maximilians-Universität München
- Known for: Representation theory, ring theory
- Awards: Fellow of the American Mathematical Society
- Scientific career
- Fields: Mathematics
- Workplaces: University of California Santa Barbara
- Thesis: Endomorphismenringe von Selbstgeneratoren (1974)
- Doctoral advisor: Friedrich Kasch

Birge Katharina Huisgen-Zimmermann is a mathematician at University of California, Santa Barbara specializing in representation theory and ring theory.

== Life and career ==
Huisgen-Zimmerman was born in Germany. Her father was the chemistry professor Rolf Huisgen. She received her Ph.D. from Ludwig-Maximilians-Universität München in 1974 under the supervision of Friedrich Kasch. Huisgen-Zimmerman received her habilitation from Technical University of Munich in 1979, and stayed on the faculty at the Technical University of Munich until 1981. She became a researcher at the Deutsche Forschungsgemeinschaft, a faculty member at the University of Iowa, and a professor with a personal chair at the University of Passau, before moving to Santa Barbara in 1987.

== Awards and honors ==
In 2012, Huisgen-Zimmerman became a fellow of the American Mathematical Society.

== Selected publications ==
- Zimmermann-Huisgen, Birge: Pure submodules of direct products of free modules. Math. Ann. 224 (1976), no. 3, 233–245. doi:10.1007/BF01459847
- Zimmermann-Huisgen, Birge; Zimmermann, Wolfgang: On the sparsity of representations of rings of pure global dimension zero. Trans. Amer. Math. Soc. 320 (1990), no. 2, 695–711. doi:10.1090/S0002-9947-1990-0965304-0
- Zimmermann-Huisgen, Birge: Homological domino effects and the first finitistic dimension conjecture. Invent. Math. 108 (1992), no. 2, 369–383. doi:10.1007/BF02100610
- Eklof, Paul C.; Huisgen-Zimmermann, Birge; Shelah, Saharon: Torsion modules, lattices and p-points. Bull. London Math. Soc. 29 (1997), no. 5, 547–555. arXiv preprint (For the definition of p-point see Glossary of general topology#P.)
- Huisgen-Zimmermann, Birge: Purity, algebraic compactness, direct sum decompositions, and representation type. In: Krause, H.; Ringel, C.M. (eds.) Infinite length modules (Bielefeld, 1998), 331–367, Trends Math., Birkhäuser, Basel, 2000. doi:10.1007/978-3-0348-8426-6_18
