= Hugo Weidel =

Austrian chemist (1849-1899)

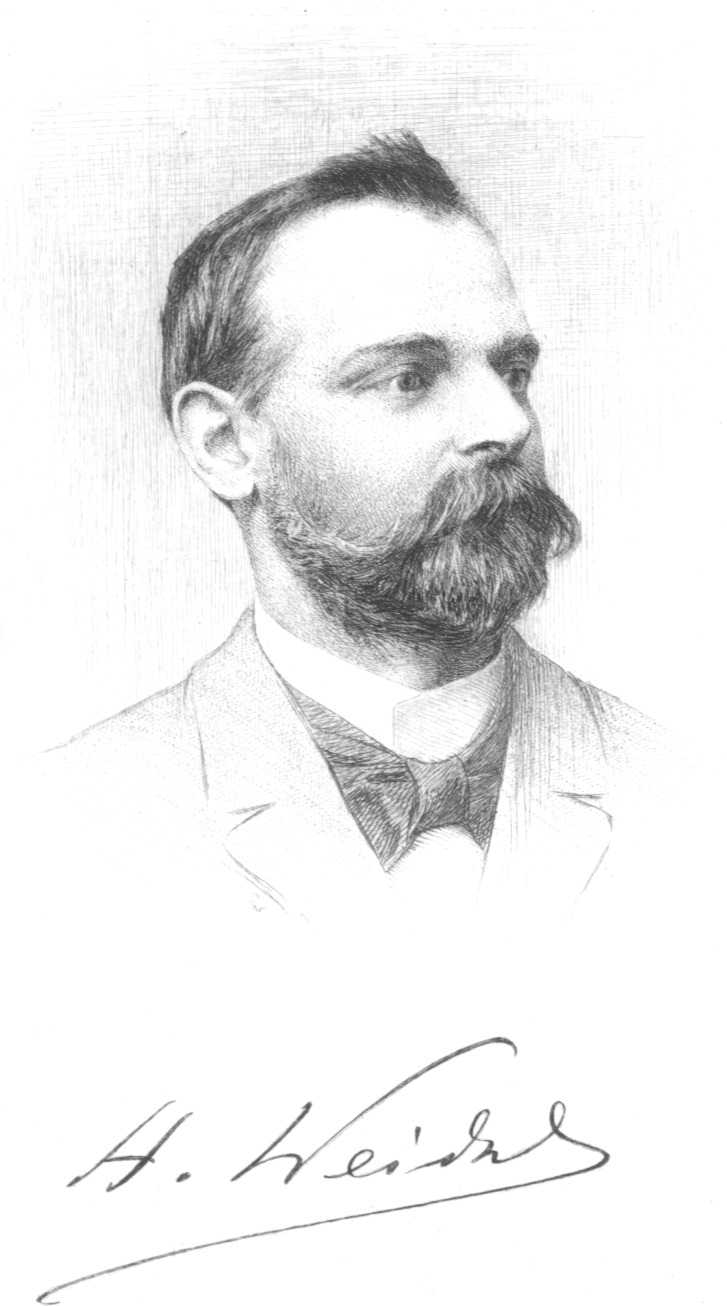
- Born: 13 November 1849; Vienna Austria-Hungary
- Died: 7 June 1899 (aged 49); Vienna Austria-Hungary
- Known for: 8-Hydroxyquinoline nicotinic acid Paraquat; Picoline
- Awards: Lieben Prize (1880)
- Scientific career
- Fields: organic chemistry
- Academic advisors: Heinrich Hlasiwetz

Hugo Weidel (13 November 1849 – 7 June 1899) was a chemist from Austria-Hungary known for inventing Weidel's reaction and describing the structure of the organic compound nicotinic acid (niacin). For his achievements, Weidel received the Lieben Prize in 1880.

== Life and work ==
Hugo Weidel was born in Vienna in 1849. He studied at the Vienna University of Technology with Heinrich Hlasiwetz. He later moved to the University of Heidelberg, Germany, and obtained a Ph.D. degree there in 1870. After returning to Vienna, Weidel became assistant of Hlasiwetz in 1871. During that time, he started his research on oxidation products of cinchonine and nicotine alkaloids. He became a lecturer at the university in 1874, and, after Ludwig Barth von Barthenau became the chair of the department, Weidel could intensify his research on alkaloids. Although the oxidation of nicotine was already known, Weidel was the first to isolate large enough amounts to determine the properties of the material. That work earned him the Lieben Prize in 1880. In 1886, Weidel became a professor of agricultural chemistry at the pedology institute in Vienna. Most of his time there was occupied by lecturing and educating students. After the retirement of von Barth in 1891, he returned to his previous institute and assumed the position of full professor.

Structure of nicotinic acid

In 1890, Weidel became a member of the Austrian Academy of Sciences and in 1898 he received the Decoration of the Iron Crown of the emperor of Austria.

== Death ==
Without any sign of illness, he delivered his lecture on the morning of June 7, 1899, but died after a few hours from a heart problem.
