= Theodor Wertheim =

Austrian chemist (1820–1864)

- Born: 25 December 1820; Vienna, Austrian Empire
- Died: 6 July 1864 (aged 43); Vienna, Austrian Empire

Theodor Wertheim (25 December 1820 – 6 July 1864) was an Austrian chemist.

== Life ==
Wertheim was born on 25 December 1820 in Vienna, Austrian Empire. He was the father of gynecologist Ernst Wertheim and brother of physicist Guillaume Wertheim.

Wertheim studied organic chemistry in Berlin as a pupil of Eilhard Mitscherlich, and in 1843 travelled to the University of Prague, where he studied under Josef Redtenbacher. He served as privatdozent in Vienna, and from 1853 to 1860, was a professor at the University of Pest. From 1861 onward, he was a professor at the University of Graz. In May 1864, he moved back to Vienna, where he died soon afterwards.

In 1848, Wertheim became a corresponding member of the Vienna Academy of Sciences.

In 1844, Wertheim distilled a pungent substance from garlic, naming it "allyl". In his research, he noticed the close relationship between garlic oil and mustard oil. He published a number of studies on garlic oil, piperine, quinine and coniine in Liebig's Annalen der Chemie.

== See also ==
- Allyl group
- Diallyl disulfide
