= Otto Porsch =

Austrian biologist (1875–1959)

- Born: 12 September 1875; Vienna Austria-Hungary
- Died: 2 January 1959 (aged 83); Vienna Austria
- Awards: Lieben Prize (1927)

Otto Porsch (12 September 1875 – 2 January 1959) was an Austrian biologist.

After his Ph.D he worked with Gottlieb Haberlandt in Graz and did his habilitation with Richard Wettstein in Vienna. He became first director of the botanical garden in Czernowitz (now Chernivtsi, Ukraine) and later professor at the University of Czernowitz (now Chernivtsi University). Porsch became director of the botanical institute in Vienna in 1920. He retired in 1945 and died in 1959.
