= Otto von Fürth =

Austrian biochemist (1867–1938)

- Born: November 18, 1867; Strakonitz Austria-Hungary now Czech Republic
- Died: June 7, 1938 (aged 70); Vienna, Austria
- Awards: Lieben Prize 1923

Otto von Fürth (18 November 1867 – 7 June 1938) was an Austrian physician, physiologist, biochemist, and university teacher. Fürth studied at the University of Prague, the University of Heidelberg, and the University of Berlin. He worked at the University of Vienna, the University of Prague, and the University of Straßburg, where he received his habilitation in medical chemistry in 1899. From that point on, Fürth worked in Vienna, focusing on biochemistry. In 1898, he announced the discovery of "suprerenin." Fürth received the Lieben Prize in 1923.
