= Johann Gasteiger =

German chemist (born 1941)

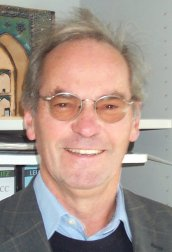
- Born: 27 October 1941; Dachau, Germany
- Education: ETH Zurich; University of Zurich; LMU Munich
- Known for: Cheminformatics; Neural networks in Chemistry
- Scientific career
- Fields: Chemist
- Workplaces: University of Erlangen-Nuremberg; Technical University of Munich
- Doctoral advisor: Rolf Huisgen

Johann Gasteiger (27 October 1941 in Dachau) is a German Chemist and a Chemoinformatician on which he wrote and edited various books.

== Life ==
Johann Gasteiger studied Chemistry at LMU Munich, ETH Zurich and University of Zurich. He obtained his PhD in Organic Chemistry at LMU Munich in 1971 with Professor Rolf Huisgen. After Postdoc at the University of California, Berkeley until 1972, he was an assistant professor at Technical University of Munich and received his Habilitation in 1979 under the mentorship of Professor Ivar Ugi. From 1994 until 2007 he was a professor at University of Erlangen–Nuremberg in the "Computer-Chemie-Centrum", which he cofounded. In 1997, Johann Gasteiger founded the company Molecular Networks, which distributes software developed at the Computer-Chemie-Centrum.

Johann Gasteiger is one of the pioneers of Cheminformatics. His main research interest is the development of software for drug design (for example via QSAR, the simulation of chemical reactions, for synthesis planning in organic chemistry, machine learning for spectroscopy, and the application of neural networks and genetic algorithms in chemistry.

== Career ==
In 1979, Johann Gasteiger and Mario Marsili published a method for the iterative calculation of atomic partial charges in molecules. This work is his most-cited publication. Between 1987 and 1991 Johann Gasteiger was a project manager for the development of the ChemInform RX database. Since 1985, the 3D structure generator CORINA is developed in his group.

Johann Gasteiger has pioneered the use of neural networks in chemistry. It is mainly his contribution that neural networks are one of standard methods in Cheminformatics today.

== Awards ==
- 1991 Gmelin-Beilstein Denkmünze of the Society of German Chemists for contributions to Computational Chemistry
- 1997 Herman Skolnik Award of the Division of Chemical Information of the American Chemical Society
- 2005 Mike Lynch Award of the Chemical Structure Association
- 2006 ACS Award for Computers in Chemical and Pharmaceutical Research
- 2006 The 2nd German Conference on Chemoinformatics (also the 20th CIC-Workshop of the Fachgruppe Chemie-Information-Computer of the GDCh) was dedicated to Johann Gasteiger.
