= Robert Kralovics =

Robert Kralovics (born 1970) is a Slovak born geneticist, working in the area of blood neoplasms.

Robert Kralovics was born in 1970 in Nové Zámky, Slovakia, which was at that time part of Czechoslovakia. Robert Kralovics earned his master's degree in Molecular Biology and Genetics at Comenius University in Bratislava and later his PhD in Biophysics at the Academy of Sciences of the Czech Republic in Brno. He completed his post-doctoral work on the genetics of myeloproliferative disorders working with Josef Prchal at the University of Alabama in Birmingham, US. In 2000, he joined Joe Prchal’s group as assistant professor at Baylor College of Medicine in Houston. From 2001, he was a project leader with Radek Skoda in Basel, Switzerland. In 2006, Robert Kralovics joined CeMM Research Center for Molecular Medicine in Vienna, Austria as an independent principal investigator.

His research interests lie primarily in myeloproliferative neoplasms (MPNs) and in myeloid malignancies in general. His major achievements so far include the identification of mutations in the JAK2 kinase gene (V617F) and the identification of CALR gene mutations, which play an important role in MPN pathogenesis. Robert Kralovics continues his research at CeMM seeking to find new mutations causing familial predisposition to hematological malignancies using advanced genomics approaches and understanding how genetic variability contributes to the disease. More recently, Robert’s research focuses on the development of immunotherapy for CALR-positive patients and the identification of novel therapeutic strategies in MPNs.

In 2010, Robert Kralovics was awarded with the Lieben Prize of the Austrian Academy of Sciences for achievements in uncovering the genetic basis of myeloproliferative disorders.
