= Otto Hönigschmid =

Czech/Austrian chemist

- Otto Hönigschmid
- Born: 13 March 1878; Horowitz, Kingdom of Bohemia, Austria-Hungary (today Czech Republic)
- Died: 14 October 1945 (aged 67); Munich, Free State of Bavaria, American Zone, Allied-occupied Germany
- Education: Charles University in Prague
- Known for: measurement of atomic mass
- Awards: Liebig Medal (1940), Haitinger Prize (1913)
- Scientific career
- Fields: Chemistry
- Workplaces: University of Paris, Harvard University, Ludwig-Maximilians-Universität München
- Doctoral advisor: Guido Goldschmiedt
- Doctoral students: Eduard Zintl, Josef Goubeau

Otto Hönigschmid (13 March 1878 in Hořovice – 14 October 1945 in Munich) was a Czech/Austrian chemist. He published the first widely accepted experimental proof of isotopes along with Stefanie Horovitz. Throughout his career he worked to precisely define atomic weights for over 40 elements, and served on committees with the purpose of adopting internationally agreed upon values. After his home and laboratory in Munich were destroyed in World War II, he committed suicide in 1945.

== Education ==
Hönigschmid studied organic chemistry at the Charles University in Prague under the guidance of Guido Goldschmiedt (the discoverer of the structure of papaverine). Additionally, he worked as a student researcher in Paris under Henri Moissan from 1904 to 1906. He was habilitated in 1908 upon publication of a thesis on carbide and silicide.

== Career and Scientific Research ==
In 1909, Hönigschmid worked under Theodore Richards at Harvard University to determine the official weight of calcium. During this year he learned Richards' Nobel Prize winning methods for precisely determining atomic weights, which earned Hönigschmid credibility in the field.

From 1911-18 he was a professor and directory of the laboratory of inorganic and analytical chemistry at the Prague Polytechnic University. He was simultaneously involved in research at the Radium Institute of Vienna, traveling back and forth between the two cities. He was asked by Frederick Soddy and Kazimierz Fajans to determine precise atomic weights of lead from radioactive sources in support of their radioactive displacement law of Fajans and Soddy, which had not yet been credibly proven by experimental means. At the suggestion of Lise Meitner, he recruited Stefanie Horovitz in 1914 to work from his Vienna lab processing lead from uranium-rich pitchblende and measuring its atomic weight to the thousandth of a gram. The two co-published their results showing a significant difference in weight between the uranium lead (206.736 g/mol) and standard lead (207.190 g/mol), thereby providing the first authoritative proof of the existence of isotopes. Within two years, Hönigschmid and Horovitz demonstrated the second known case of isotopes by showing that ionium, a recently discovered element, was in fact thorium-230.

In 1918, he moved to Germany to teach at the Ludwig-Maximilians-Universität München, where he founded a laboratory specifically for research with atomic weights. He and his colleagues worked up until 1941 to precisely define atomic weights of over 40 elements. Notable contributions redefined values for silver, niobium, tantalum, and phosphorus. Contributing to the work of Ernest Rutherford and Marie Curie, Hönigschmid prepared radium standards for comparison in 1912 and again in 1934. Additionally, he served as the chairman of the German Atomic Weight Commission from 1920-1930, and in 1930 became the German representative in the Atomic Weights Committee of the International Union of Chemistry. This work was instrumental in the adoption of precisely defined atomic weights in the international scientific community.

== Awards ==
He won the Haitinger Prize of the Austrian Academy of Sciences in 1913, and the Liebig Medal in 1940.

== Death ==
Much of Hönigschmid's work, his home, and his laboratory in Munich were destroyed during World War II. Facing difficulties with his health and housing, he committed suicide alongside his wife in 1945. The two had been staying with the widow of Hans Fischer, a friend and colleague who had also killed himself a few months prior.
