= Christian Ludwig Reissig =

German romantic poet

Christian Ludwig Reissig (later von Reissig) ( 24 July 1784 – 5 November 1847) was a German romantic poet, chiefly remembered for those of his lyrics set as Lieder by Beethoven, Schubert, Salieri, von Krufft and Diabelli.

== Biography ==
Reissig was born in Cassel to the knife- and instrument-maker Christian Reißig and baptized as Tileman Christian Ludwig Reißig some time between 24 July and 3 August 1784. He entered the Imperial Austrian Army in 1808 and as Rittmeister (cavalry squadron commander) and Oberleutnant participated in the Napoleonic wars of liberation, being elevated to nobility in recognition of his service. He was wounded in the Battle of Aspern-Essling and cited for bravery:

At the storming of Esslingen on May 22 [1809] Lieutenant (later Commander) Reissig commanded a part of the Archduke Karl's regiment that was affrighted and put to flight by the enemy by whom they were greatly outnumbered. To recall them to their duty the officer cried 'Let he who is a brave Austrian and loves his Emperor follow me.' and fell on the enemy, followed by his fellows who fought like Spartans.

On 24 March 1815 von Reissig married Maria Carolina Barbara von Bernrath and had a son, Alois von Reissig (born 22 May 1822), by which time he was serving in the Spanish cavalry. He was buried in the family crypt in Szombathely.
