= Hans-Ulrich Reissig =

German chemist (born 1949)

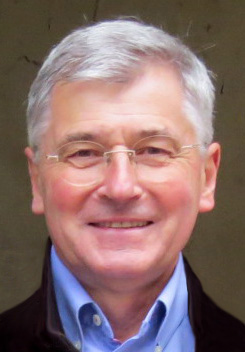
- Born: 9 May 1949 (age 77); Bavaria, Germany
- Education: Ludwig-Maximilians-Universität München
- Known for: donor-acceptor substituted cyclopropanes methods in organic synthesis
- Awards: Liebig Medal of the Gesellschaft Deutscher Chemiker (2014)
- Scientific career
- Fields: Organic Chemistry
- Workplaces: Technische Universität Darmstadt 1986–93, Technische Universität Dresden 1993–99, Freie Universität Berlin 1999–2015
- Thesis: Neue Beiträge zu den Additionen der Diazoalkane und zur Chemie der 3H-Pyrazole (1978)
- Doctoral advisor: Rolf Huisgen

Hans-Ulrich Reissig (German: Hans-Ulrich Reißig; born 9 May 1949) is a German chemist and was a full professor of Organic Chemistry at FU Berlin.

== Education and academic career ==
Reissig was born in Helmbrechts, Bavaria, Germany. He studied chemistry at Ludwig-Maximilians-Universität München (Germany) from 1970 to 1975, where he completed his PhD in 1978 under the supervision of Rolf Huisgen, with a thesis "Neue Beiträge zu den Additionen der Diazoalkane und zur Chemie der 3H-Pyrazole" (Contributions to the Additions of Diazoalkanes and the Chemistry of 3H-Pyrazoles). After a postdoctoral research stay at University of British Columbia, Vancouver, with Edward Piers (1938–2010), he started his independent research at the Julius-Maximilians-Universität Würzburg (Germany) in 1979 under the mentorship of Siegfried Hünig finishing his habilitation in 1984 (Chemistry of Donor-Acceptor Cyclopropanes). As Heisenberg awardee and lecturer he stayed in Würzburg until 1986. From 1986 to 1993, he was associate professor at TU Darmstadt and after the German reunification full professor at TU Dresden from 1993 to 1999. He was professor at FU Berlin from 1999 to his retirement in 2015.

== Research contributions ==
His research interests include the development of new synthetic methods, the investigation of reaction mechanisms and the synthesis of natural products. In 1980 he introduced the term "Donor-Acceptor Substituted Cyclopropanes" and used these building blocks systematically in his research. He is particularly interested in reactions of lithiated alkoxyallenes, the use of samarium diiodide in synthesis and cycloadditions of nitroso alkenes. Besides the synthesis of a broad range of heterocycles his group achieved total syntheses of natural products (strychnine, γ-rubromycin etc.) as well as the syntheses of bioactive compounds such as carbohydrate mimetics.

== Honors ==
Reissig was awarded the Karl-Winnacker Fellowship of the Hoechst AG in 1985. He has been a corresponding member of the Bavarian Academy of Sciences and Humanities since 2012 and received the Liebig Medal of the Gesellschaft Deutscher Chemiker in 2014.

== Publications ==
- Reissig, Hans-Ulrich. Donor-acceptor-substituted cyclopropanes: Versatile building blocks in organic synthesis, in Mark S. Baird, H. U. Reissig, Jacques R. Y. Salaün: Small ring compounds in organic syntheses III, Topics in current chemistry 144, Springer Verlag 1988.
- Reissig, Hans-Ulrich; Zimmer, Reinhold (2003). "Donor−Acceptor-Substituted Cyclopropane Derivatives and Their Application in Organic Synthesis†". Chemical Reviews. 103 (4): 1151–1196. doi:10.1021/cr010016n. ISSN 0009-2665. PMID 12683780.
- Brasholz, Malte; Sörgel, Sebastian; Azap, Cengiz; Reißig, Hans-Ulrich (2007). "Rubromycins: Structurally Intriguing, Biologically Valuable, Synthetically Challenging Antitumour Antibiotics". European Journal of Organic Chemistry. 2007 (23): 3801–3814. doi:10.1002/ejoc.200601054. ISSN 1434-193X.
- Högermeier, Jens; Reissig, Hans-Ulrich (2009). "Nine Times Fluoride can be Good for your Syntheses.Not just Cheaper: Nonafluorobutanesulfonates as Intermediates for Transition Metal-Catalyzed Reactions". Advanced Synthesis & Catalysis. 351 (17): 2747–2763. doi:10.1002/adsc.200900566. ISSN 1615-4150.
- Pfrengle, Fabian; Reissig, Hans-Ulrich (2010). "Amino sugars and their mimetics via 1,2-oxazines". Chem. Soc. Rev. 39 (2): 549–557. doi:10.1039/B914356D. ISSN 0306-0012. PMID 20111779.
- Beemelmanns, Christine; Reissig, Hans-Ulrich (2011). "Samarium diiodide induced ketyl-(het)arene cyclisations towards novel N-heterocycles". Chemical Society Reviews. 40 (5): 2199–210. doi:10.1039/c0cs00116c. ISSN 0306-0012. PMID 21243132.
- Zimmer, Reinhold; Reissig, Hans-Ulrich (2014). "Alkoxyallenes as building blocks for organic synthesis". Chem. Soc. Rev. 43 (9): 2888–2903. doi:10.1039/C3CS60429B. ISSN 0306-0012. PMID 24549322.
