= Wolfgang Beck =

German chemist

Wolfgang Beck is a German inorganic chemist who contributed to organometallic chemistry as well. He was a professor at LMU Munich.

Beck received his PhD under Walter Hieber at the Technical University of Munich. He later moved to LMU Munich. He became emeritus in 2000.

== Research ==
Beck published widely on complexes of simple inorganic and organic ligands. One theme was on organometallic derivatives of amino acids. He investigated weakly coordinating anions well before the theme was popular.

== Recognition ==
- Liebig Memorial Medal (Gesellschaft Deutscher Chemiker)
- Lavoisier Medal for Bioorganometallic Chemistry
