= Andrius Baltuška =

Lithuanian physicist

- Born: 26 November 1971 (age 54); Leningrad
- Education: University of Groningen
- Awards: Lieben Prize
- Scientific career
- Fields: Laser physics
- Workplaces: Technical University of Vienna

Andrius Baltuška (born 26 November 1971 in Leningrad) is a Lithuanian physicist.

Baltuška studied physics at the University of Vilnius later at the University of Amsterdam and received his PhD from the University of Groningen in 2000. After postdoctoral positions at the University of Tokyo, Technical University of Vienna and Max Planck Institute for Quantum Optics he became professor at the Technical University of Vienna in 2006.

== Awards ==
- 2004 European Young Investigator Award
- 2006 Lieben Prize
