= Nusser Island =

Nusser Island (65°43′S 65°43′W) is an island 1.5 nautical miles (2.8 km) north of Laktionov Island, off the east side of Renaud Island in the Biscoe Islands. The island was first accurately shown on an Argentine government chart of 1957. It was named by the United Kingdom Antarctic Place-Names Committee (UK-APC) in 1959 for Franz Nusser, an Austrian meteorologist who specialized in sea ice studies.

== See also ==
- List of Antarctic and sub-Antarctic islands
