= Fritz Pregl =

Slovene-Austrian Nobel prize laureate and scientist (1869–1930)

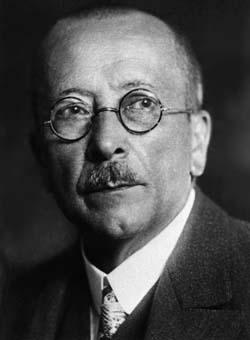
- Born: 3 September 1869; Laibach, Duchy of Carniola, Cisleithania, Austria-Hungary (now Ljubljana, Slovenia)
- Died: 13 December 1930 (aged 61); Graz, Styria, Austria
- Education: University of Graz
- Occupations: Graz circuit forensic chemist (1907); Dean of the Graz University Medical Faculty (1916-1917); Vice Chancellor of Graz University (1920-1921)
- Known for: Microelemental analysis
- Awards: Lieben Prize (1914); Nobel Prize for Chemistry (1923)
- Scientific career
- Fields: Chemistry, medicine
- Workplaces: University of Graz, University of Innsbruck
- Doctoral advisor: Alexander Rollett

Fritz Pregl (Slovene: Friderik Pregl; 3 September 1869 – 13 December 1930), was a Slovenian-Austrian chemist and physician from a mixed Slovene-German-speaking background. He won the Nobel Prize in Chemistry in 1923 for making important contributions to quantitative organic microanalysis, one of which was the improvement of the combustion train technique for elemental analysis.

== Biography ==
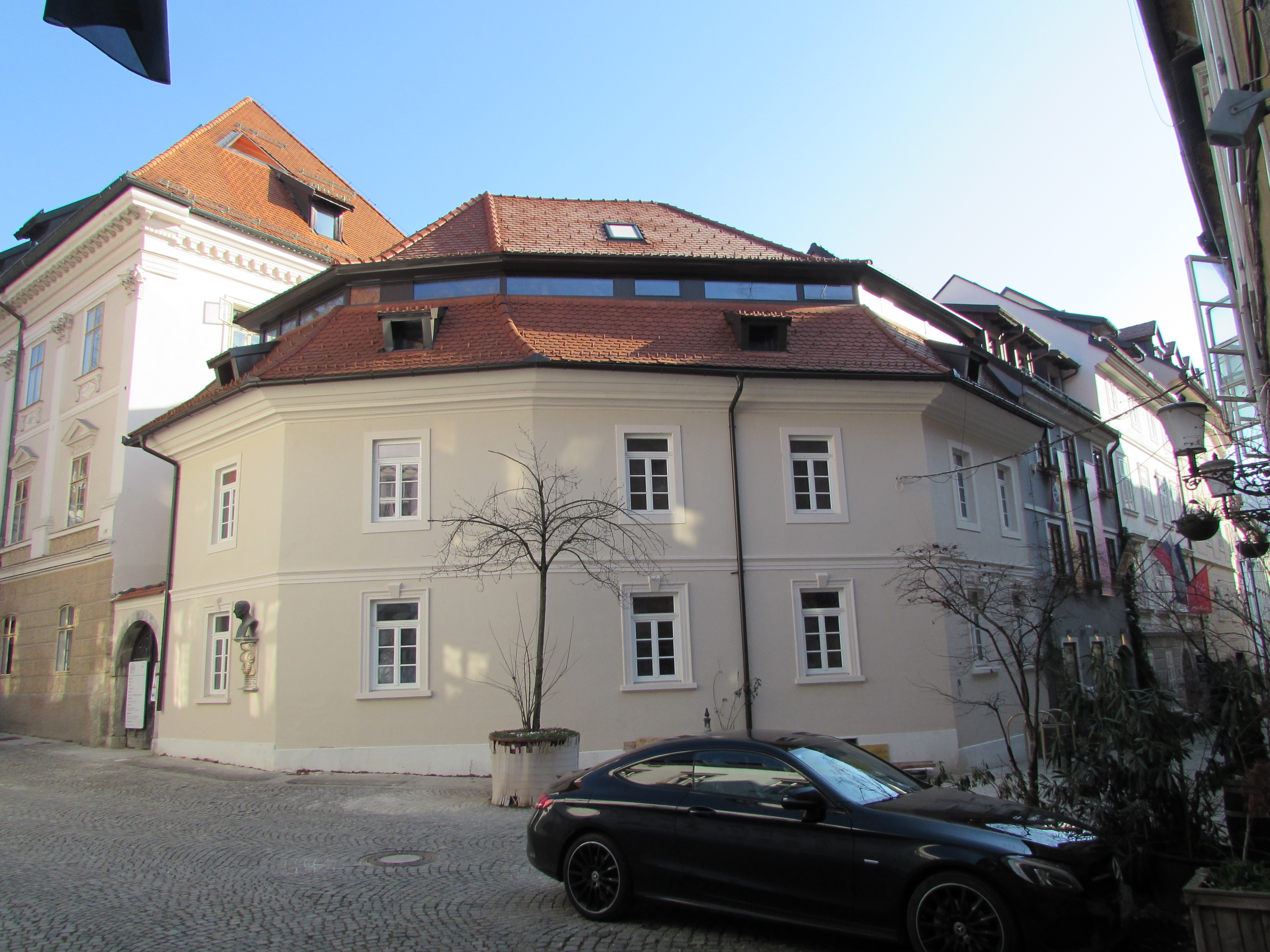
Pregl's birthplace on Gosposka ulica / Herrengasse ("Lords' Street"), Ljubljana

Pregl was born in Ljubljana within Austria-Hungary to a Slovene-speaking father and German-speaking mother. He was baptized Friedrich Michael Raimund Pregl. He died in Graz, Austria in 1930.

Pregl started his career as chemist after he studied medicine at the University of Graz. With his focus on physiology and especially chemical physiology, he suffered from the limitations of quantitative organic microanalysis. The small quantities of substances he obtained during the research of bile acid made it necessary to improve the process of elemental analysis by reducing the necessary components. At the end of his research, he had lowered the minimal amount of substance necessary for the analysis process by a factor of 50. He invited chemists to learn his method of elemental analysis, so that the method was soon widely accepted.

== Commemoration ==
In 1950, the department of the University of Graz where Fritz Pregl had worked was named the Institute of Medical Chemistry and Pregl Laboratory. Streets in Graz, Innsbruck, Vienna and Klagenfurt were named after him. In Slovenia, Pregl Awards have been bestowed annually since 2007 by the National Institute of Chemistry for the research work and for outstanding doctorates. Slovenian pupils are conferred Pregl Recognition Awards, whereas secondary school students are conferred Pregl Citations for excellent results in national competitions in chemistry. A square in Ljubljana is named after Pregl. The Fritz Pregl Prize has been awarded annually since 1931 in chemistry by the Austrian Academy of Sciences from the funds left at its disposal by Pregl.
