= Zoltan Nusser =

Hungarian physiologist

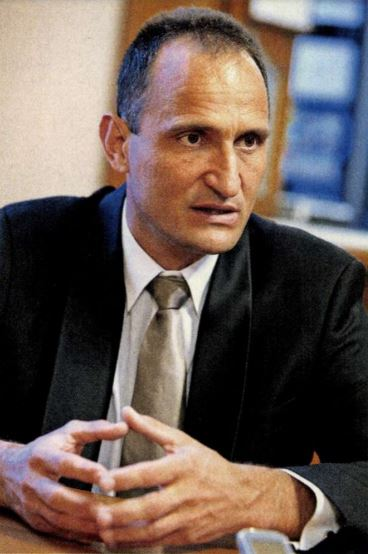
- Nusser in 2013
- Education: Oxford University
- Awards: Lieben Prize
- Scientific career
- Fields: physiology
- Doctoral advisor: Peter Somogyi
- Doctoral students: Attila Losonczy

Zoltan Nusser is a physiologist. He was awarded the Lieben Prize in 2004.

He graduated from the University of Budapest, in 1992 and received his Ph.D. in Physiology from Oxford University in 1995. He works at the Institute of Experimental Medicine in Budapest since 2000.
