= Eduard Zintl =

German chemist (1898–1941)

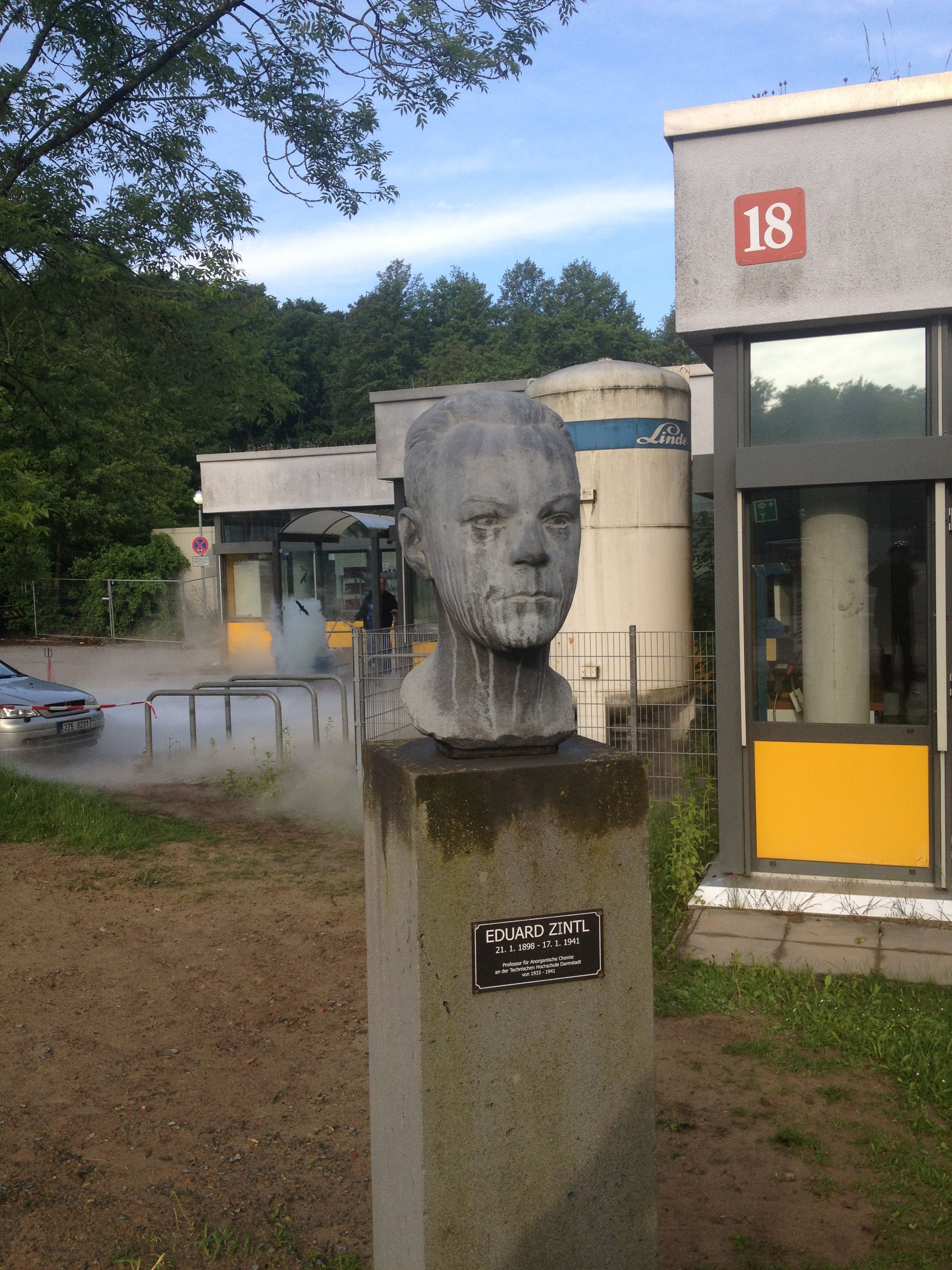
- Born: 21 January 1898; Weiden, Germany
- Died: 17 January 1941 (aged 42); Darmstadt, Germany
- Education: Ludwig-Maximilians-Universität München
- Known for: Zintl phase
- Scientific career
- Fields: Inorganic chemistry
- Workplaces: Ludwig-Maximilians-Universität München, Technische Universität Darmstadt
- Doctoral advisor: Otto Hönigschmid
- Doctoral students: Josef Goubeau; Georg Brauer

Eduard Zintl (21 January 1898 – 17 January 1941) was a German chemist. He gained prominence for research on intermetallic compounds.

== Family background ==
After his family moved from Weiden and Bayreuth to Munich and after he had finished school, he was drafted for military service during World War I. At the age of 21, he started studying at the Ludwig-Maximilians-Universität München with Otto Hönigschmid. He was an excellent student, and later became an assistant for Otto Hönigschmid, head of the German atomic weight laboratory.

== Career ==
He earned his PhD in 1923, at the age of 25, with a thesis on the molar mass of bromine. He stayed with Otto Hönigschmid's group, where he was involved in the supervision of PhD students, for example Josef Goubeau and Günther Rienäcker. From 1928 till 1933 he was professor of inorganic chemistry at the University of Freiburg. During this period he studied the structure of complex anions formed by metals in a solution of sodium in ammonia. [Na(NH_{3})_{x}]^{+}_{4}[Pb_{9}]^{4−} is one of the examples he discovered.

Working in an atomic weight laboratory as a student assistant had provided him a lot of experience with chemical elements and how they react with each other. He noted that the atomic volume contraction between these compounds were formed, and it could indicate cation formation.

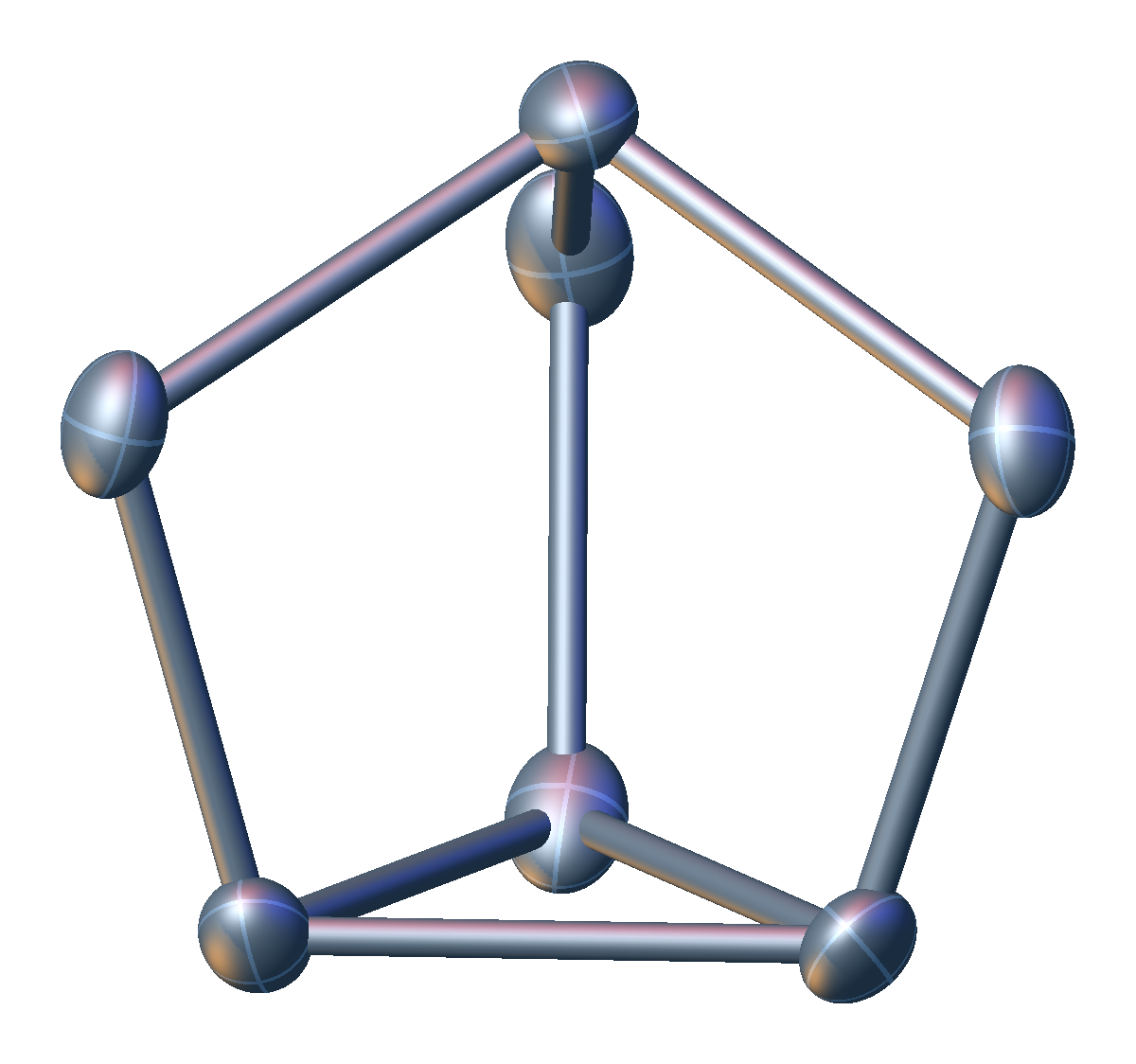
Structure of [As_{7}]^{3-} trianionic subunit in the Zintl phase Cs_{2}NaAs_{7}.

=== Work at Darmstadt ===
In 1933, he moved to a position at the Technische Universität Darmstadt, where a new building for inorganic and physical chemistry was planned and built. The research on complex anions led him to the discovery of the Zintl phases. The structure of Zintl phases were ionic, and the structure of the anion (aka Zintl ion) could result an electronic state. His study focused on intermetallic compounds and how the electron could be transferred from a more electropositive metal. In the Zintl phase, the structure of the Zintl ion (polyanion) should be similar to an isoelectronic element. For example, in Na_{2}Tl, the polyanion is tetrahedral (Tl_{4})^{8−}, similar to the phosphorus molecule P_{4}.
