= Attila Losonczy =

Hungarian neuroscientist (born 1974)

- Born: 1974 (age 51–52); Nagykanizsa, Hungary
- Education: University of Pécs; Semmelweis University
- Awards: Searle Scholar; NARSAD Young Investigator Award; NIH BRAIN Initiative Award
- Scientific career
- Fields: Circuit neuroscience
- Workplaces: University of Texas Southwestern Medical Center, Dallas
- Doctoral advisor: Zoltan Nusser

Attila Losonczy (born 1974) is a Hungarian neuroscientist, Professor of Neuroscience at University of Texas Southwestern Medical Center, Dallas and Director of the Program in Memory Longevity in the O'Donnell Brain Institute at UTSW. Losonczy's main area of research is on the relationship between neural networks and behavior, specifically with regard to learning in the hippocampus.

His group conducts research on spatial navigation and episodic learning in animal models as well as the pathology of cognitive memory deficits in neurodegenerative disorders and psychiatric disorders such as PTSD and anxiety. Losonczy is currently working on developing in vivo imaging methods using two-photon microscopy and calcium imaging to simultaneously image hundreds of hippocampal place cells in conscious mice performing spatial tasks.

== Early life and education ==
Attila Losonczy was born in Nagykanizsa, Hungary, in 1974. He received the MD degree from the University of Pécs Medical School in 1999, and subsequently the PhD degree at Semmelweis University in Neurobiology in 2004 with a thesis entitled "Underlying mechanisms of short-term synaptic plasticity at identified central synapses," advised by Zoltan Nusser. In 2003, he moved from Hungary to the United States; from 2003 to 2006, Losonczy was a postdoctoral fellow at Louisiana State University with Jeffrey Magee. In 2006, he served as a postdoctoral fellow with Gero Miesenböck at Yale University.

== Career ==
From 2007 to 2009, Losonczy worked as a research specialist at Howard Hughes Medical Institute, again working with Magee.

In 2009, Losonczy joined the faculty at Columbia University as a professor. Since 2010, Losonczy has been a member of the Kavli Institute for Brain Science. In 2011, Losonczy was named a Searle Scholar. In 2013, he was awarded the NARSAD Young Investigator Award. Losonczy was awarded the BRAIN Initiative Award by the National Institute of Health in two consecutive years, 2014 and 2015. Losonczy is a journal reviewer for Science, Cell, Nature Neuroscience, and Neuron, among others.

Losonczy and his PhD student Matthew Lovett-Barron uncovered the role of interneurons in fear memory formation in the hippocampus using in vivo imaging and optogenetics. By deactivating these interneurons, Losonczy showed that fear memories could be suppressed and contextual fear conditioning could thus be prevented. This discovery is significant to research into the mechanism psychiatric disorders such as post-traumatic stress disorder.

In 2015, Losonczy and his PhD student Nathan Danielson discovered the role of neurogenesis in the dentate gyrus in memory formation and pattern separation. To perform this study, Losonczy used two-photon microscopy and calcium imaging to image newborn granule cells in the mouse hippocampus and compare them with mature neurons as the mice traveled through subtly different contexts. No previous work had been able to study the roles of newborn and mature cells in the dentate gyrus as it was not previously possible to image the dentate gyrus at all, much less observe individual dentate gyrus cells in detail, as it lies too deep in the midbrain. To overcome these obstacles, Losonczy and his collaborators pioneered and implemented several novel techniques to be used simultaneously including the implantation of a miniature microscope into the brains of mice, genetically modifying mouse neurons to fluoresce, and optogenetically silencing a subset of neurons. This discovery repudiated the pre-existing theory that newborn neurons carried new memories. Rather, Losonczy found that the firing of older cells was more localised and newborn neurons fire indiscriminately, not taking on a stereotyped firing pattern until they got older. This suggests that the more excitable newborn neurons are better at encoding new stimuli than more mature neurons. This discovery is significant, as anxiety, depression, and posttraumatic stress disorder are thought to be associated with failures in pattern separation.

== Bibliography ==
- Jeffrey D Zaremba, Anastasia Diamantopoulou, Nathan B Danielson, Andres D Grosmark, Patrick W Kaifosh, John C Bowler, Zhenrui Liao, Fraser T Sparks, Joseph A Gogos & Attila Losonczy. Impaired hippocampal place cell dynamics in a mouse model of the 22q11.2 microdeletion. Nature Neuroscience, 2017
- Danielson N, Zaremba JD, Kaifosh P, Lovett-Barron M, Tsai J, Denny CA, Balough ME, Cloidt MA, Drew JD, Hen R, Losonczy A*, and Kheirbek MA. Distinct contribution of adultborn hippocampal granule cells to context encoding
- Basu, J; Zaremba, JD; Cheung, SK; Hitti, FL; Zemelman, BV; Losonczy, A; Siegelbaum, SA (2016). "Gating hippocampal activity, plasticity and memory by entorhinal cortex long-range inhibition". Science. 351 (6269) aaa5694. doi:10.1126/science.aaa5694. PMC 4920085. PMID 26744409.
- Lovett-Barron, M; Kaifosh, P; Kheirbek, MA; Danielson, N; Zaremba, JD; Reardon, TR; Turi, GF; Hen, R; Zemelman, BV; Losonczy (2014). "Dendritic inhibition in the hippocampus supports fear learning". Science. 21 (6173): 857–63. Bibcode:2014Sci...343..857L. doi:10.1126/science.1247485. PMC 4018419. PMID 24558155.
- Losonczy, A; Zemelman, BV; Vaziri, A; Magee, JC (2010). "Network mechanisms of theta related neuronal activity in hippocampal CA1 pyramidal neurons". Nature Neuroscience. 13 (8): 967–972. doi:10.1038/nn.2597. PMC 2921679. PMID 20639875.
- Varga, V; Losonczy, A; Zemelman, BV; Borhegyi, Z; Nyiri, G; Domonkos, G; Hangya, B; Holderith, B; Magee, JC; Freund, TF (2009). "Fast synaptic subcortical control of hippocampal circuits". Science. 326 (5951): 449–453. doi:10.1126/science.1178307. PMID 19833972. S2CID 5605810.
- Losonczy, A; Makara, JK; Magee, JC (2008). "Compartmentalized dendritic plasticity and input feature storage in neurons". Nature. 452 (7186): 436–441. Bibcode:2008Natur.452..436L. doi:10.1038/nature06725. PMID 18368112. S2CID 4334146.
- Losonczy, A; Magee, JC (2006). "Integrative properties of radial oblique dendrites in hippocampal CA1 pyramidal neurons". Neuron. 50 (2): 291–307. doi:10.1016/j.neuron.2006.03.016. PMID 16630839. S2CID 233827.
