= Josef Redtenbacher =

Austrian chemist

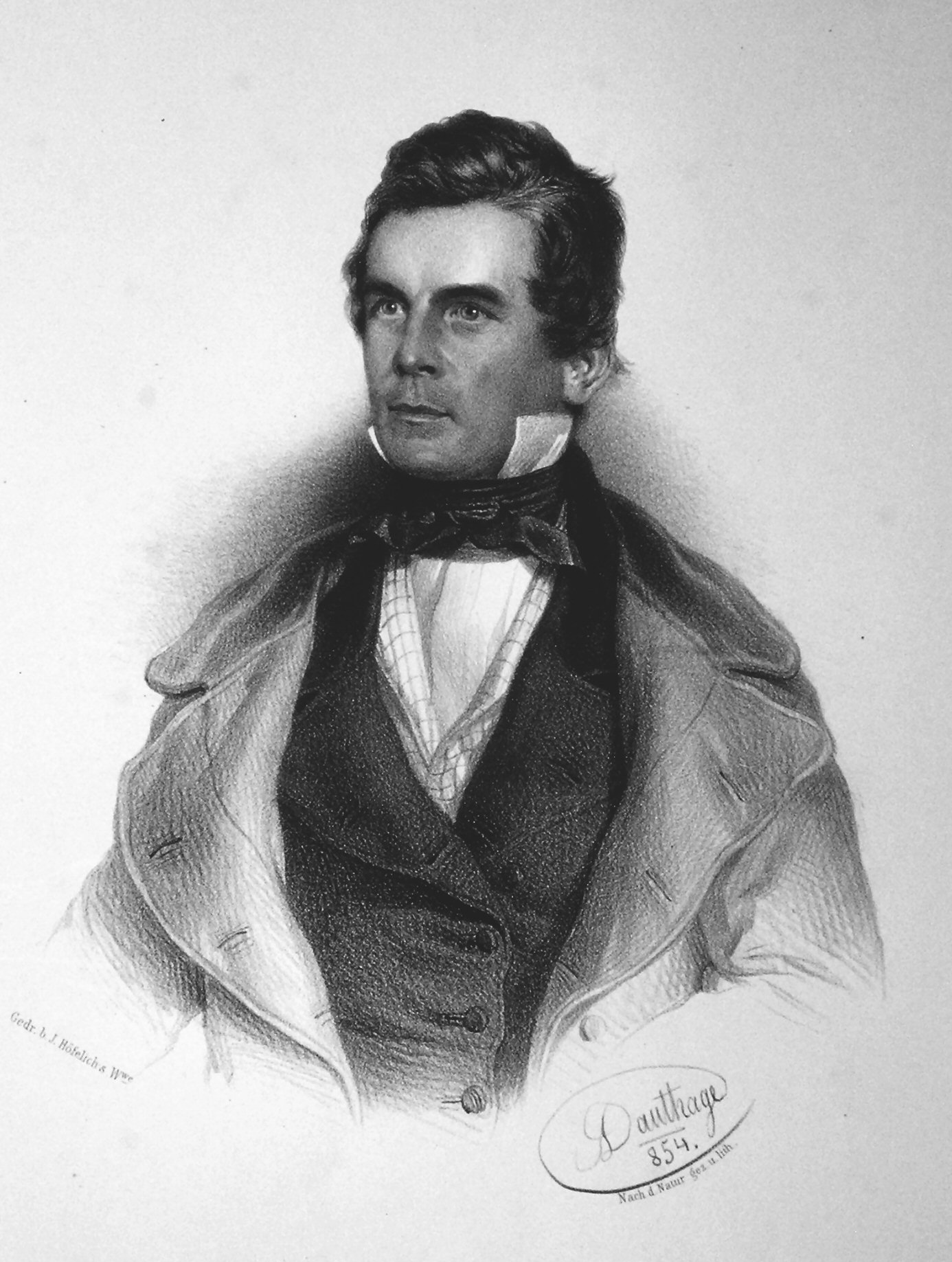
Josef Redtenbacher (1810-1870)

Josef Redtenbacher (March 13, 1810 – March 5, 1870) was an Austrian chemist born in Kirchdorf an der Krems, Upper Austria. He was a brother to entomologist Ludwig Redtenbacher (1814–1876).

He studied medicine and botany at the University of Vienna, and was influenced by the work of mineralogist Friedrich Mohs. After graduation, he remained in Vienna as an assistant to chemist Joseph Franz von Jacquin. He later travelled to Germany, where he studied mineralogy under Heinrich Rose in Berlin and organic chemistry with Justus von Liebig at the University of Giessen.

Subsequently, he became a professor of chemistry at the University of Prague, and in 1849, returned to Vienna as a successor to Adolf Martin Pleischl. Shortly before his death, he was planning, together with architect Heinrich von Ferstel, construction of a new university laboratory in Vienna.

He is credited with the discoveries of acrolein and acrylic acid. He also performed important research involving the composition of taurine.
