= Exner =

Exner is a surname. Notable people and characters with the surname include:

- Adam Exner (1928–2023), Archbishop of the Roman Catholic Archdiocese of Vancouver from 1991 to 2004
- Bethany Exner, fictional character in American TV series Fear the Walking Dead
- Felix Maria von Exner-Ewarten (1876–1930), Austrian meteorologist and geophysicist
- Franz S. Exner (1849–1926), Austrian physicist
- Győző Exner (1864–1945), Hungarian chess master
- John E. Exner (1928–2006), American psychologist
- Judith Exner (1934–1999), American woman, reputed to be mistress of US president John F. Kennedy and of two Mafia leaders
- Julius Exner, (1825–1910), Danish genre painter
- Sigmund Exner (1846–1926), Austrian physiologist
- Stanislav Kasparovich Exner (1859–1921), Polish-Russian musician and first director of Saratov State Conservatory
- Virgil Exner (1909–1973), American automobile designer for numerous American companies, notably Chrysler and Studebaker

== See also ==
- Call–Exner bodies, granulosa cells arranged haphazardly around a space containing eosinophilic fluid
- Exner equation, statement of conservation of mass that applies to sediment in a fluvial system such as a river
- Exner function, parameter in atmospheric modeling
- Exner Revival Cars, series of "revival car" concepts for a December, 1963 issue of Esquire magazine
- Exner syndrome, disorder also known as serpentine fibula polycystic kidney syndrome
