= Nuclear emulsion =

Type of particle detector

A nuclear emulsion plate is a type of particle detector first used in nuclear and particle physics experiments in the early decades of the 20th century. It is a modified form of photographic plate that can be used to record and investigate fast charged particles like alpha-particles, nucleons, leptons or mesons. After exposing and developing the emulsion, single particle tracks can be observed and measured using a microscope.

== Description ==
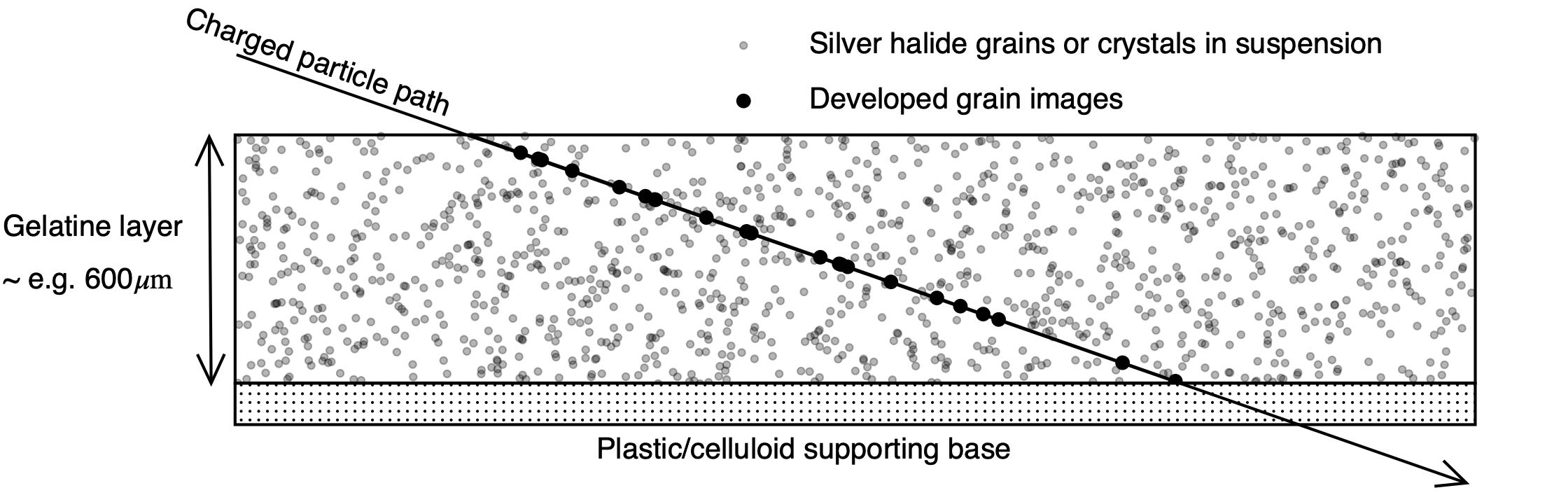
Schematic edge-view cross section of nuclear emulsion, not to scale.

The nuclear emulsion plate is a modified form of photographic plate, coated with a thicker photographic emulsion of gelatine containing a higher concentration of very fine silver halide grains; the exact composition of the emulsion being optimised for particle detection.

It has the primary advantage of extremely high spatial precision and resolution, limited only by the size of the silver halide grains (sub micron); precision and resolution that surpass even the best of modern particle detectors (observe the scale in the image below, of K-meson decay).

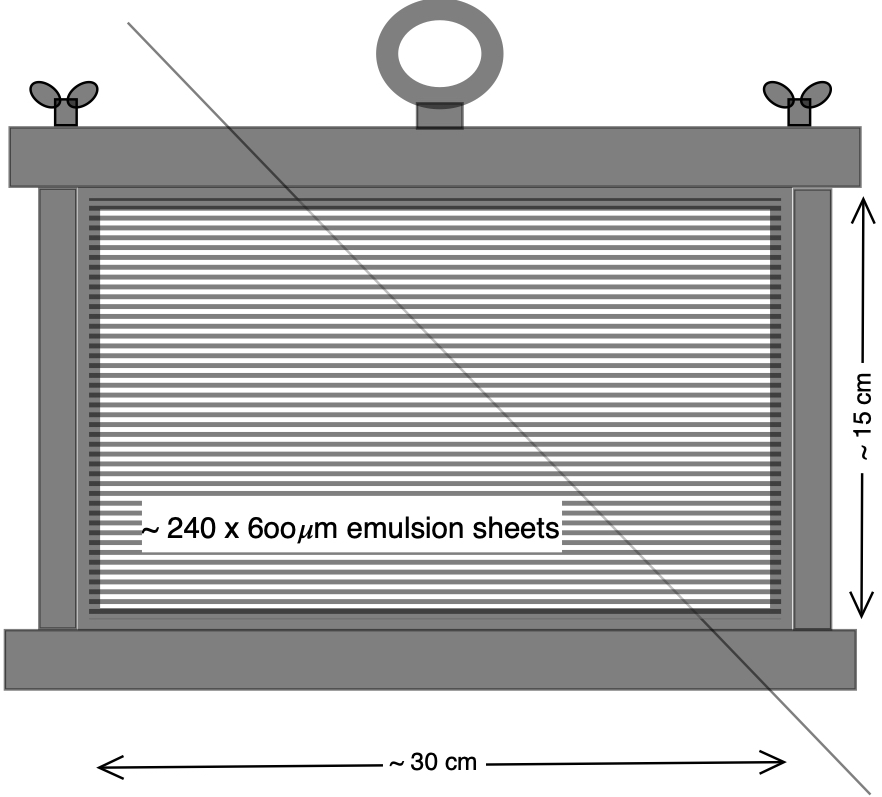
Nuclear Emulsion Stack

A stack of emulsion plates, effectively forming a block of emulsion, can record and preserve the interactions of particles so that their trajectories are recorded in 3-dimensional space as a trail of silver-halide grains, which can be viewed from any aspect on a microscopic scale. In addition, the emulsion plate is an integrating device that can be exposed or irradiated until the desired amount of data has been accumulated. It is compact, with no associated read-out cables or electronics, allowing the plates to be installed in very confined spaces and, compared to other detector technologies, is significantly less expensive to manufacture, operate and maintain. These features were decisive in enabling the high-altitude, mountain and balloon based studies of cosmic rays that led to the discovery of the pi-meson and parity violating charged K-meson decays; shedding light on the true nature and extent of the subnuclear "particle zoo", defining a milestone in the development of modern experimental particle physics.

The chief disadvantage of nuclear emulsion is that it is a dense and complex material (silver, bromine, carbon, nitrogen, oxygen) which potentially impedes the flight of particles to other detector components through multiple scattering and ionising energy loss. Finally, the development and scanning of large volumes of emulsion, to obtain useful, 3-dimensional digitised data, has in the past been a slow and labour-intensive process. However, recent developments in automation of the process may overcome that drawback.

These disadvantages, coupled with the emergence of new particle detector and particle accelerator technologies, led to a decline in use of nuclear emulsion plates in particle physics towards the end of the 20th century. However, there remains a continuing use of the method in the study of rare processes and in other branches of science, such as autoradiography in medicine and biology.

For a comprehensive and technically detailed account of the subject refer to the books by Powell, Fowler and Perkins and by Barkas. For an extensive review of the history and wider scientific context of the nuclear emulsion method, refer to the book by Galison.

== History ==
Following the 1896 discovery of radioactivity by Henri Becquerel using photographic emulsion, Ernest Rutherford, working first at McGill University in Canada, then at the University of Manchester in England, was one of the first physicists to use that method to study in detail the radiation emitted by radioactive materials. In 1905 he was using commercially available photographic plates to continue his research into the properties of the recently discovered alpha rays produced in the radioactive decay of some atomic nuclei. This involved analysing the darkening of photographic plates caused by irradiation with the alpha rays. This darkening was enabled by the interaction of the many charged alpha particles, making up the rays, with silver halide grains in the photographic emulsion that were made visible by photographic development. Rutherford encouraged his research colleague at Manchester, Kinoshita Suekiti, to investigate in more detail the photographic action of the alpha-particles.

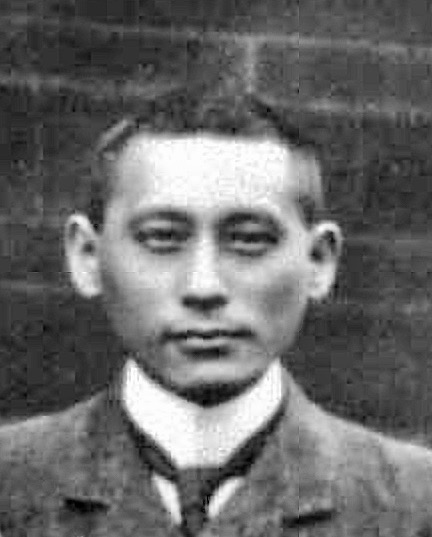
Physicist Kinoshita Suekiti at the University of Manchester in 1910

Kinoshita included in his objectives "to see whether a single 𝛂-particle produced a detectable photographic event". His method was to expose the emulsion to radiation from a well measured radioactive source, for which the emission rate of 𝛂-particles was known. He used that knowledge and the relative proximity of the plate to the source, to compute the number of 𝛂-particles expected to traverse the plate. He compared that number with the number of developed halide grains he counted in the emulsion, taking careful account of 'background radiation' that produced additional 'non-alpha' grains in the exposure. He completed this research project in 1909, showing that it was possible "by preparing an emulsion film of very fine silver halide grains, and by using a microscope of high magnification, that the photographic method can be applied for counting 𝛂-particles with considerable accuracy". This was the first time that the observation of individual charged particles by means of a photographic emulsion had been achieved. However, that was the detection of individual particle impacts, not the observation of a particle's extended trajectory. Soon after that, in 1911, Max Reinganum showed that the passage of an 𝛂-particle at glancing incidence through a photographic emulsion produced, when the emulsion was developed, a row of silver halide grains outlining the trajectory of the 𝛂-particle; the first recorded observation of an extended particle track in an emulsion.

The next steps would naturally have been to apply this technique to the detection and research of other particle types, including the Cosmic Rays newly discovered by Victor Hess in 1912. However, progress was halted by the onset of World War I in 1914. The outstanding issue of improving the particle detection performance of standard photographic emulsions, in order to detect other types of particle - protons, for example, produce about one quarter of the ionisation caused by an 𝛂-particle - was taken up again by various physical research laboratories in the 1920s.

In particular Marietta Blau, working at the Institute for Radium Research, Vienna in Austria, began in 1923 to investigate alternative types of photographic emulsion plates for detection of protons, known as "H-rays" at that time.

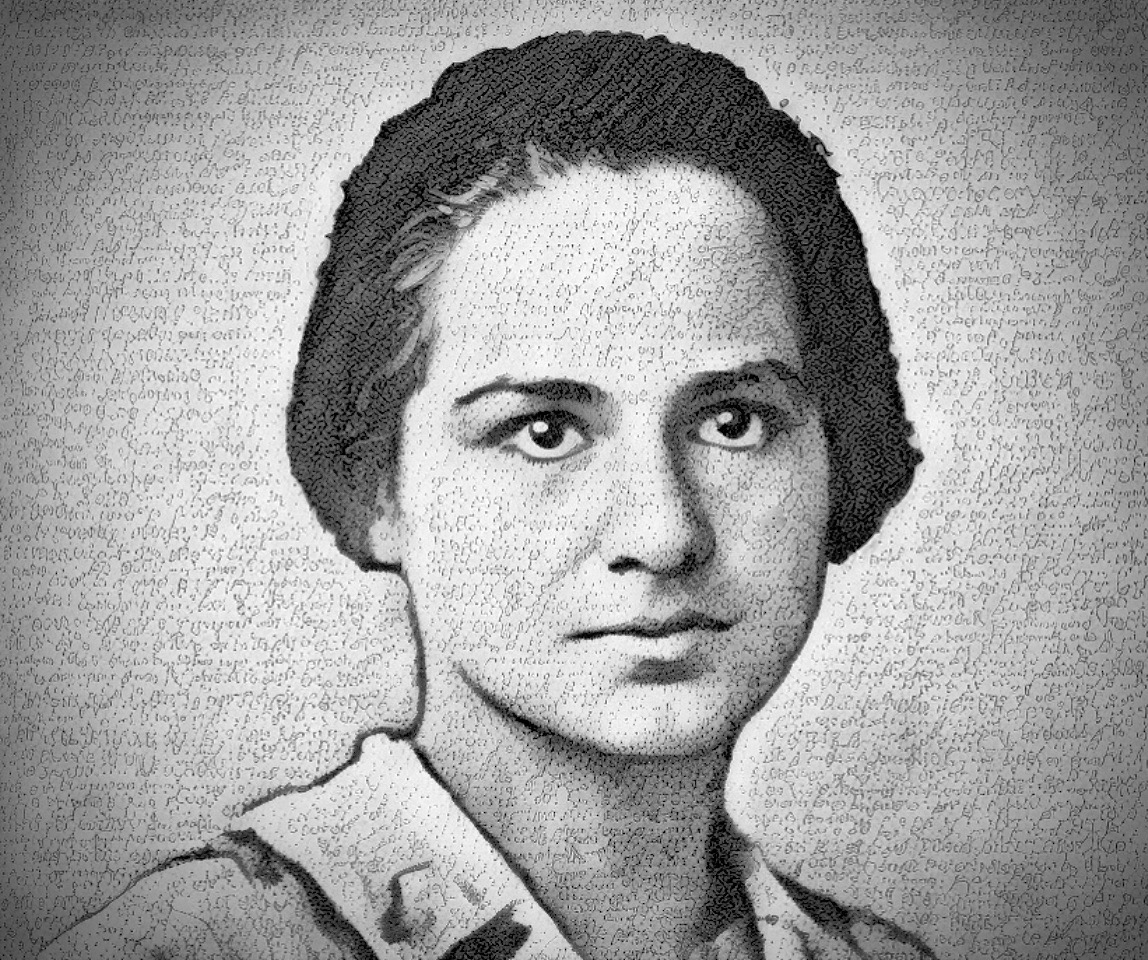
Marietta Blau

She used a radioactive source of 𝛂-particles to irradiate paraffin wax, which has a high content of hydrogen. An 𝛂-particle may collide with a hydrogen nucleus (proton), knocking that proton out of the wax and into the photographic emulsion, where it produces a visible track of silver halide grains. After many trials, using different plates and careful shielding of the emulsion from unwanted radiation, she succeeded in making the first ever observation of proton tracks in a nuclear emulsion.

By an ingenious example of lateral thinking, she applied a similar method to make the first ever observation of the impact of neutrons in nuclear emulsion. Being electrically neutral the neutron cannot, of course, be directly detected in a photographic emulsion, but if it strikes a proton in the emulsion, that recoiling proton can be detected. She used this method to determine the energy spectrum of neutrons resulting from specific nuclear reaction processes. She developed a method to determine proton energies by measuring the exposed grain density along their tracks (fast minimum ionising particles interact with fewer grains than slow particles). To record the long tracks of fast protons more accurately, she enlisted British film manufacturer Ilford (now Ilford Photo) to thicken the emulsion on its commercial plates, and she experimented with other emulsion parameters — grain size, latent image retention, development conditions — to improve the visibility of alpha-particle and fast-proton tracks.

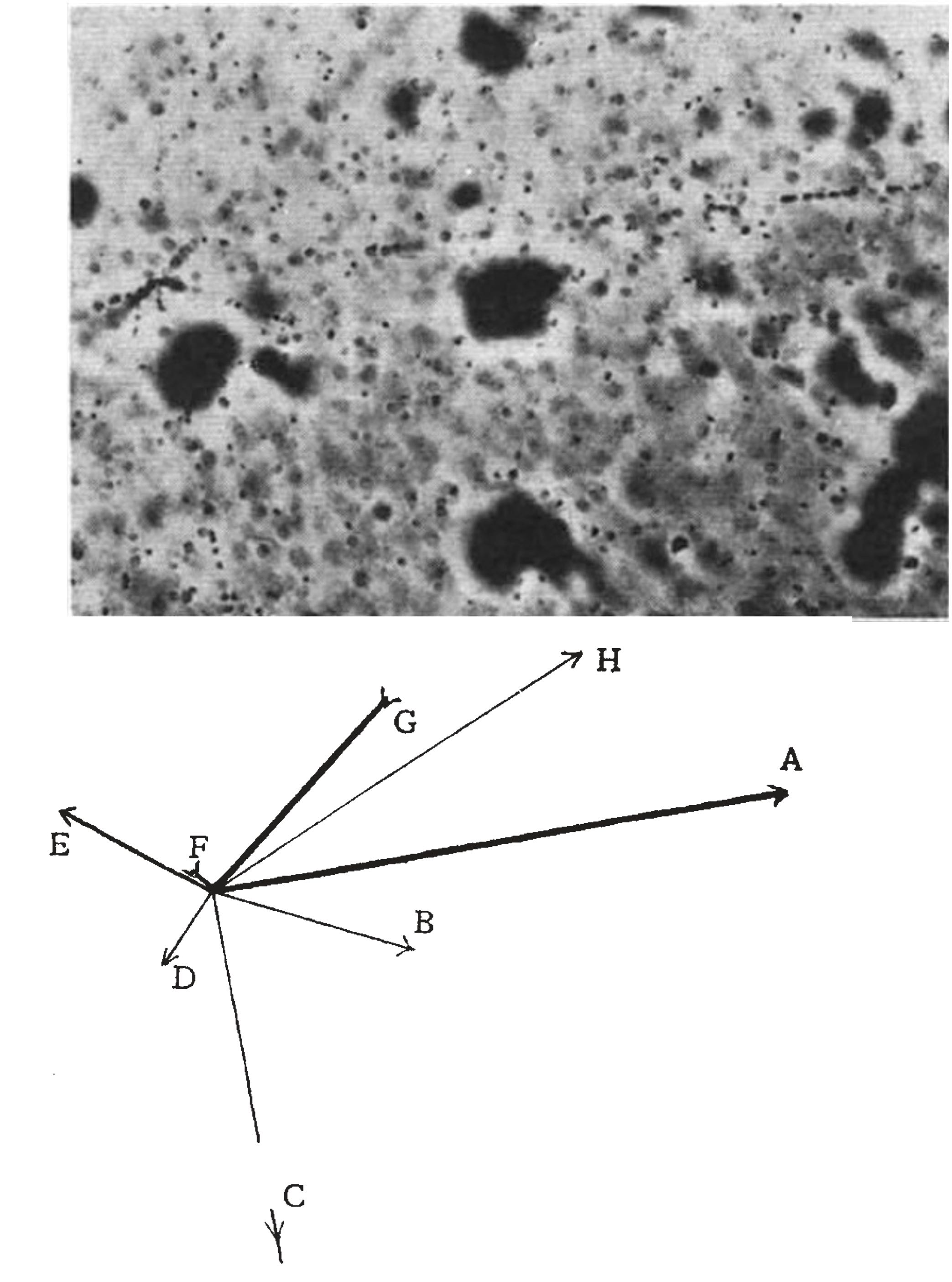
First observation of a cosmic ray colliding with and disintegrating an atomic nucleus.

In 1937, Marietta Blau and her former student Hertha Wambacher discovered nuclear disintegration stars (Zertrümmerungsterne) due to spallation in nuclear emulsions that had been exposed to cosmic radiation at a height of 2300m on the Hafelekarspitze above Innsbruck. This discovery caused a sensation in the world of nuclear and cosmic ray physics, which brought the nuclear emulsion method to the attention of a wider audience. But the onset of political unrest in Austria and Germany, leading to World War II, brought a sudden halt to progress in that field of research for Marietta Blau.

In 1938, the German physicist Walter Heitler, who had escaped Germany as a scientific refugee to live and work in England, was at Bristol University researching a number of theoretical topics, including the formation of cosmic ray showers. He mentioned to Cecil Powell, at that time considering the use of cloud chambers for cosmic ray detection, that in 1937 the two Viennese physicists, Blau and Wambacher, had exposed photographic emulsions in the Austrian Alps and had seen the tracks of low energy protons as well as 'stars' or nuclear disintegrations caused by cosmic rays.

This intrigued Powell, who convinced Heitler to travel to Switzerland with a batch of llford half-tone emulsions and expose them on the Jungfraujoch at 3,500 m. In a letter to 'Nature' in August 1939, they were able to confirm the observations of Blau and Wambacher.

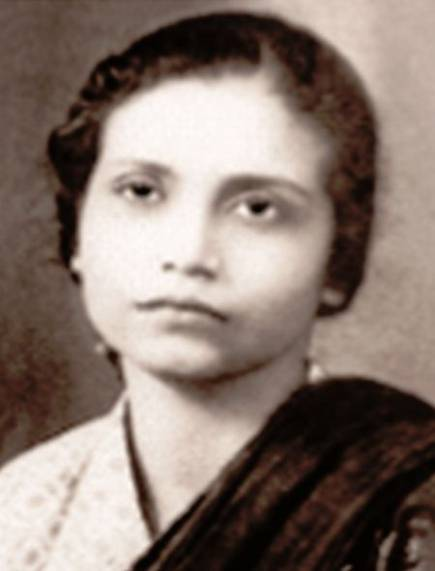
Bibha Chowdhuri

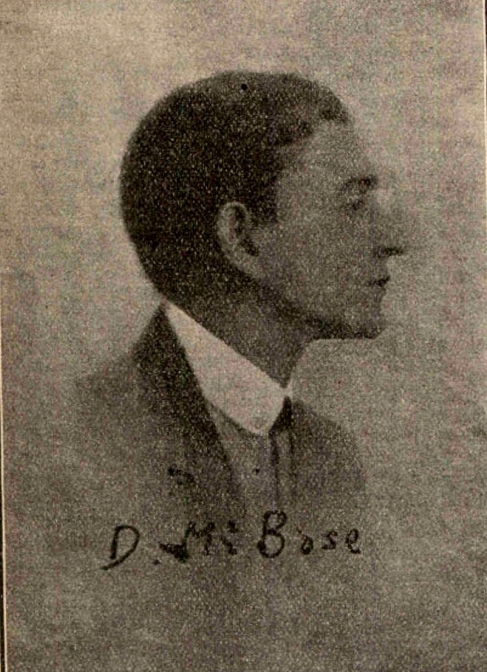
D M Bose 1927

Although war brought a decisive halt to cosmic ray research in Europe between 1939 and 1945, in India Debendra Mohan Bose and Bibha Chowdhuri, working at the Bose Institute, Kolkata, undertook a series of high altitude mountain-top experiments using photographic emulsion to detect and analyse cosmic rays. These measurements were notable for the first ever detection of muons by the photographic method: Chowdhuri's painstaking analysis of the observed tracks' properties, including exposed halide grain densities with range and multiple-scattering correlations, revealing the detected particles to have a mass about 200 times that of the electron - the same 'mesotron' (later 'mu-meson' now muon) discovered in 1936 by Anderson and Neddermeyer using a Cloud Chamber. Distance and circumstances denied Bose and Chowdhuri the relatively easy access to manufacturers of photographic plates available to Blau and later, to Heitler, Powell et al.. It meant that Bose and Chowdhuri had to use standard commercial half-tone emulsions, rather than nuclear emulsions specifically designed for particle detection, which makes even more remarkable the quality of their work.

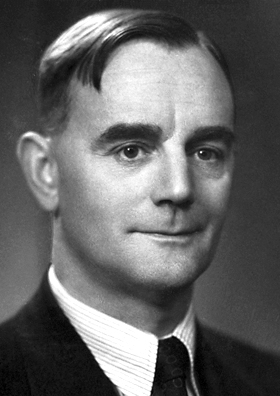
Cecil Powell

Following on from those developments, after World War II, Powell and his research group at Bristol University collaborated with Ilford (now Ilford Photo), to further optimise emulsions for the detection of cosmic ray particles. Ilford produced a concentrated 'nuclear-research' emulsion containing eight times the normal amount of silver bromide per unit volume (see External Link to 'Nuclear emulsions by Ilford'). Powell's group first calibrated the new 'nuclear-research' emulsions using the University of Cambridge Cockcroft–Walton generator/accelerator, which provided artificial disintegration particles as probes to measure the required range-energy relations for charged particles in the new emulsion.

They subsequently used these emulsions to make two of the most significant discoveries in physics of the 20th century. First, in 1947, Cecil Powell, César Lattes, Giuseppe Occhialini and Hugh Muirhead (University of Bristol), using plates exposed to cosmic rays at the Pic du Midi Observatory in the Pyrenees and scanned by Irene Roberts and Marietta Kurz, discovered the charged Pi-meson.

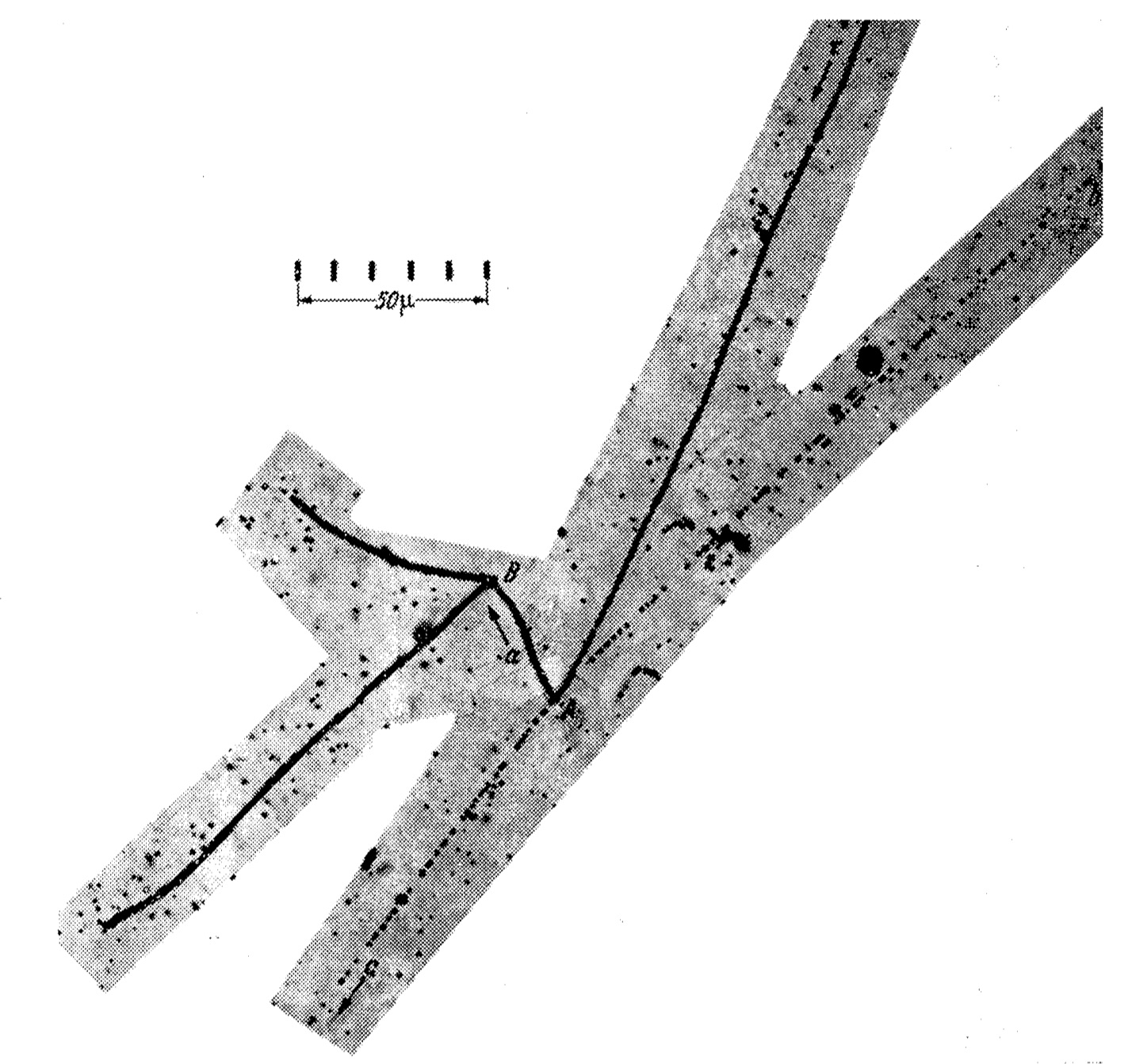
Kaon decay in a nuclear emulsion. The positively-charged kaon enters at the top of the image and decays into a π^{−} meson (a) and two π^{+} mesons (b and c). The π^{−} meson interacts with a nucleus in the emulsion at B.

Second, two years later in 1949, analysing plates exposed at the Sphinx Observatory on the Jungfraujoch in Switzerland, first precise observations of the positive K-meson and its 'strange' decays were made by Rosemary Brown (now Rosemary Fowler), a research student in Cecil Powell's group at Bristol. Then known as the 'Tau meson' in the tau–theta puzzle, precise measurement of these K-meson decay modes led to the introduction of the quantum concept of Strangeness and to the discovery of Parity violation in the weak interaction. Rosemary Brown called the striking four-track emulsion image, of one 'Tau' decaying to three charged pions, her "K track", thus effectively naming the newly discovered 'strange' K-meson. Cecil Powell was awarded the 1950 Nobel Prize in Physics "for his development of the photographic method of studying nuclear processes and his discoveries regarding mesons made with this method".

The emergence of new particle detector and particle accelerator technologies, coupled with the disadvantages noted in the introduction, led to a decline in use of Nuclear Emulsion plates in Particle Physics towards the end of the 20th century. However, there remained a continuing use of the method in the study of rare interactions and decay processes.

More recently, searches for "Physics beyond the Standard Model", in particular the study of neutrinos and dark matter in their exceedingly rare interactions with normal matter, have led to a revival of the technique, including automation of emulsion image processing. Examples are the OPERA experiment, studying neutrino oscillations at the Gran Sasso Laboratory in Italy, and the FASER experiment at the CERN LHC, which will search for new, light and weakly interacting particles including dark photons.

== Other applications ==
There exist a number of scientific and technical fields where the ability of nuclear emulsion to accurately record the position, direction and energy of electrically charged particles, or to integrate their effect, has found application. These applications in most cases involve the tracing of implanted radioactive markers by Autoradiography. Examples are:

- Medical research
- Biological research
- Metallurgy
- Reactive surface chemistry
- Radiation protection
- Muon tomography (Muography)
- Archaeology.
