= Walter Heitler =

German physicist (1904–1981)

Walter Heitler FRS MRIA
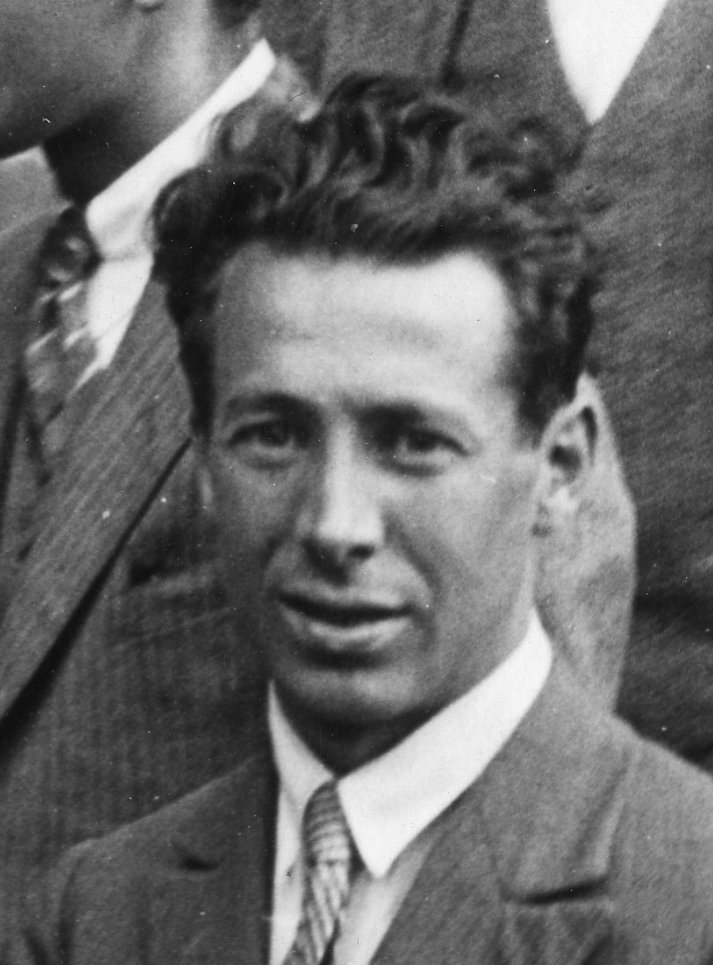
- Heitler in 1931
- Born: Walter Heinrich Heitler; 2 January 1904; Karlsruhe, German Empire
- Died: 15 November 1981 (aged 77); Zurich, Switzerland
- Citizenship: Germany; Ireland (nat. 1946)
- Education: LMU Munich (PhD); University of Göttingen (DSc)
- Known for: Valence bond theory
- Spouse: Kathleen Nicholson (m. 1942)
- Children: 1
- Awards: Max Planck Medal (1968); Marcel Benoist Prize (1969)
- Scientific career
- Fields: Physics
- Workplaces: University of Göttingen; University of Bristol; Dublin Institute for Advanced Studies; University of Zurich
- Doctoral advisor: Karl Herzfeld
- Other academic advisors: Max Born
- Doctoral students: Cécile DeWitt-Morette; Lochlainn O'Raifeartaigh

Walter Heinrich Heitler (German: [ˈvaltɐ ˈhaɪnʁɪç ˈhaɪtlɐ]; 2 January 1904 – 15 November 1981) was a German theoretical physicist who made contributions to quantum electrodynamics and quantum field theory. He brought chemistry under quantum mechanics through his theory of valence bonding.

== Education ==
Walter Heinrich Heitler was born on 2 January 1904 in Karlsruhe, Grand Duchy of Baden, German Empire, the son of Ottilie (née Rudolf) and Adolf Heitler, a Jewish engineering professor.

Heitler studied physical chemistry at LMU Munich, where he received a Doctor of Philosophy in 1926 under the supervision of Karl Herzfeld. He was a Rockefeller Foundation Fellow for postgraduate research with Niels Bohr at the University of Copenhagen in 1926 and with Erwin Schrödinger at the University of Zurich the following year. He then became an assistant to Max Born at the University of Göttingen, where he completed his habilitation in 1929. Heitler remained at Göttingen as a Privatdozent until 1933, when he was dismissed by the university on the grounds of his Jewish ancestry.

== Career and research ==
At the time Heitler obtained his doctorate, three Institutes for Theoretical Physics formed a consortium which worked on the key problems of the day, such as atomic and molecular structure, and exchanged both scientific information and personnel in their scientific quests. These institutes were located at the Ludwig-Maximilians-Universität München, under Arnold Sommerfeld; the University of Göttingen, under Max Born; and the University of Copenhagen, under Niels Bohr. Furthermore, Werner Heisenberg and Born had just recently published their trilogy of papers which launched the matrix mechanics formulation of quantum mechanics. Also, in early 1926, Erwin Schrödinger, at the University of Zurich, began to publish his quintet of papers which launched the wave mechanics formulation of quantum mechanics and showed that the wave mechanics and matrix mechanics formulations were equivalent. These papers immediately put the personnel at the leading theoretical physics institutes onto applying these new tools to understanding atomic and molecular structure. It was in this environment that Heitler used his Rockefeller Foundation Fellowship, leaving the Ludwig-Maximilians-Universität München and within a period of two years going to do research and study with the leading figures of the day in theoretical physics—Bohr at the University of Copenhagen, Schrödinger at the University of Zurich, and Born at the University of Göttingen.

At the University of Zurich, with Fritz London, Heitler applied the new quantum mechanics to deal with the saturable, non-dynamic forces of attraction and repulsion, i.e., exchange forces, of the hydrogen molecule. Their valence bond treatment of this problem, was a landmark in that it brought chemistry under quantum mechanics. Furthermore, their work greatly influenced chemistry through Linus Pauling, who had just received his doctorate and on a Guggenheim Fellowship visited Heitler and London in Zurich. Pauling spent much of his career studying the nature of the chemical bond. The application of quantum mechanics to chemistry would be a prominent theme in Heitler's career.

=== Bristol ===
While Heitler was at Göttingen, Adolf Hitler came to power in 1933. With the rising prominence of anti-Semitism under Hitler, Born took it upon himself to take the younger Jewish generation under his wing. In doing so, Born arranged for Heitler to get a position that year as a research fellow at the University of Bristol, with Nevill Francis Mott.

Heitler was a research fellow of the Academic Assistance Council in the H. H. Wills Physics Laboratory. Among other things, he worked on quantum field theory and quantum electrodynamics on his own, as well as in collaboration with other scientific refugees from Hitler, such as Hans Bethe and Herbert Fröhlich, who also left Germany in 1933.

With Bethe, he published a paper on pair production of gamma rays in the Coulomb field of an atomic nucleus, in which they developed the Bethe–Heitler formula for Bremsstrahlung (braking radiation).

In 1936, Heitler published his major work on quantum electrodynamics, The Quantum Theory of Radiation, which marked the direction for future developments in quantum theory. The book appeared in many editions and printings and has been translated into Russian.

Heitler also contributed to the understanding of cosmic rays, as well as predicting the existence of the electrically neutral pi meson. While developing the theory of cosmic ray showers in 1937, he became aware of the latest experimental work in the field; the observation of cosmic ray interactions in nuclear emulsion by Austrian physicists Marietta Blau and Hertha Wambacher. He mentioned this to Cecil Powell, saying that the method appeared so straightforward that "even a theoretician might be able also to do it". This intrigued Powell, and he convinced theoretician Heitler to travel to Switzerland with a batch of llford emulsions and expose them on the Jungfraujoch at 3500m. In a letter to Nature in August 1939, Heitler and Powell were able to confirm the observations of Blau and Wambacher—thus Heitler had some influence in setting Powell on the first step of his path to the 1950 Nobel Prize in Physics "for his development of the photographic method of studying nuclear processes and his discoveries regarding mesons made with this method".

After the fall of France in 1940, Heitler was briefly interned on the Isle of Man for several months.

=== Dublin ===
In 1941, Heitler became a professor at the Dublin Institute for Advanced Studies (DIAS), which was arranged there by Erwin Schrödinger, director of the School for Theoretical Physics. He has been described as the "unsung hero of DIAS in the 1940s".

Heitler's work with Peng Huanwu on radiation damping theory and the meson scattering process resulted in the Heitler–Peng integral equation.

In 1942, Heitler married Kathleen Winifred Nicholson, a biologist whom he met in Bristol. They lived at 21 Seapark Road, Clontarf (down the road from Schrödinger), and had a son, Eric, in 1946. Heitler became a naturalised Irish citizen the same year.

During the 1942–1943 academic year, Heitler gave a course on elementary wave mechanics, during which W. S. E. Hickson took notes and prepared a finished copy. These notes were the basis for Heitler's book Elementary Wave Mechanics: Introductory Course of Lectures, first published in 1943. A new edition was published as Elementary Wave Mechanics in 1945. This version was revised and republished many times, as well as being translated into French and Italian and published in 1949 and in German in 1961. A further revised version appeared as Elementary Wave Mechanics With Applications to Quantum Chemistry in 1956, as well as in German in 1961.

Schrödinger resigned as director of the School for Theoretical Physics in 1946, but stayed at DIAS, whereupon Heitler became director.

=== Later career ===
In 1949, Heitler accepted a position as Ordinarius Professor for Theoretical Physics and director of the Institute for Theoretical Physics at the University of Zurich, where he remained until his retirement in 1974.

In 1958, Heitler held the Lorentz Chair for Theoretical Physics at Leiden University.

While in Zurich, after some years, Heitler began writing on the philosophical relationship between science and religion. His books were published in German, English, and French.

Heitler died on 15 November 1981 in Zurich at the age of 77.

== Recognition ==
=== Memberships ===
Year	Organisation	Type	Ref.
1943	Royal Irish Academy	Member	
1948	Royal Society	Fellow	

=== Honorary degrees ===
Year	University	Degree	Ref.
1954	National University of Ireland	Doctor of Science	

=== Awards ===
Year	Organisation	Award	Ref.
1968	German Physical Society	Max Planck Medal	
1969	Marcel Benoist Foundation	Marcel Benoist Prize	

== Bibliography ==
=== Physics ===
- Walter Heitler Elementary Wave Mechanics: Introductory Course of Lectures Notes taken and prepared by W.S.E. Hickson (Oxford, 1943)
- Walter Heitler Elementary Wave Mechanics (Oxford, 1945, 1946, 1948, 1950)
- Walter Heitler The Quantum Theory of Radiation (Clarendon Press, 1936, 1944, 1947, 1949, 1950, 1953, 1954, 1957, 1960, 1966, 1970)
  - Reprinted by Dover Publications in 1984.
- Walter Heitler 14 Offprints: 1928-1947 (1947)
- Walter Heitler Eléments de Mécanique Ondulatoire (Presses Universitaires de France, PUF, Paris, 1949, 1964)
- Walter Heitler Elementi di Meccanica Ondulatoria con presentazione di R.Ciusa (Zuffi, Bologna,1949)
- Walter Heitler Elementary Wave Mechanics With Applications to Quantum Chemistry (Oxford University, 1956, 1958, 1961, 1969)
- Walter Heitler The Quantum Theory of Radiation [Russian Translation] (Moscow, 1956)
- Walter Heitler Lectures on Problems Connected with the Finite Size of Elementary Particles (Tata Institute of Fundamental Research. Lectures on mathematics and physics. Physics) (Tata Institute of Fundamental Research, 1961)
- Walter Heitler and Klaus Müller Elementare Wellenmechanik (Vieweg, 1961)
- Walter Heitler Elementare Wellenmechanik. Mit Anwendung auf die Quantenchemie (Vieweg Friedr. & Sohn Ver, 1961)
- Walter Heitler Wahrheit und Richtigkeit in den exakten Wissenschaften. Abhandlungen der mathematisch- naturwissenschaftlichen Klasse. Jahrgang 1972. Nr. 3. (Akademie der Wissenschaften und der Literatur. Mainz, Verlag der Akademie der Wissenschaften und der Literatur, Kommission bei Franz Steiner Verlag, Wiesbaden, 1972)
- Walter Heitler Über die Komplementarität von lebloser und lebender Materie. Abhandlungen der Mathematisch-Naturwissenschaftlichen Klasse, Jahrg. 1976, Nr. 1 (Mainz, Verlag der Akademie der Wissenschaften und der Literatur, Kommission bei F. Steiner, 1976)

=== Science and religion ===
- Walter Heitler Der Mensch und die naturwissenschaftliche Erkenntnis (Vieweg Friedr. & Sohn Ver, 1961, 1962, 1964, 1966, 1984)
- Walter Heitler Man and Science (Oliver and Boyd, 1963)
- Walter Heitler Die Frage nach dem Sinn der Evolution (Herder, 1969)
- Walter Heitler Naturphilosophische Streifzüge (Vieweg Friedr. & Sohn Ver, 1970, 1984)
- Walter Heitler Naturwissenschaft ist Geisteswissenschaft (Zürich : Verl. die Waage, 1972)
- K. Rahner, H.R. Schlette, B. Welte, R. Affemann, D. Savramis, W. Heitler Gott in dieser Zeit (C. H. Beck, 1972)ISBN 3-406-02484-X
- Walter Heitler Die Natur und das Göttliche (Klett & Balmer; 1. Aufl edition, 1974)ISBN 978-3-7206-9001-0
- Walter Heitler Gottesbeweise? Und weitere Vorträge (1977)ISBN 978-3-264-90100-9
- Walter Heitler La Nature et Le Divin (A la Baconniere, 1977)
- Walter Heitler Schöpfung, die Öffnung der Naturwissenschaft zum Göttlichen (Verlag der Arche, 1979)ISBN 978-3-7160-1663-3
- Walter Heitler Schöpfung als Gottesbeweis. Die Öffnung der Naturwissenschaft zum Göttlichen (1979)

== Bibliography ==
- Key Participants: Walter Heitler – Linus Pauling and the Nature of the Chemical Bond: A Documentary History
- Interview with Walter Heitler by John Heilbron (18 March 1963. Archives for the History of Quantum Physics)
- L. O'Raifeartaigh and G. Rasche: Walter Heitler 1904–81, in Creators of Mathematics, The Irish Connection, ed. Ken Houston, University College Dublin Press, 2000.
- Nancy Thorndike Greenspan, "The End of the Certain World: The Life and Science of Max Born" (Basic Books, 2005) ISBN 0-7382-0693-8.
- Mehra, Jagdish, and Helmut Rechenberg The Historical Development of Quantum Theory. Volume 5 Erwin Schrödinger and the Rise of Wave Mechanics. Part 1 Schrödinger in Vienna and Zurich 1887–1925. (Springer, 2001) ISBN 0-387-95179-2
- Jammer, Max The Conceptual Development of Quantum Mechanics (McGraw-Hill, 1966)
- Moore, Walter Schrödinger: Life and Thought (Cambridge, 1992) ISBN 0-521-43767-9
- Clary, David C., Schrödinger in Oxford (World Scientific Publishing, 2022) ISBN 9789811251009.
