= Stefan Meyer =

Stefan Meyer is the name of:

- Stefan Meyer (ice hockey) (born 1985), Canadian ice hockey player
- Stefan Meyer (physicist) (1872–1949), Austrian physicist
- Stefan Meyer (politician) (born 1984), German politician
