= Hafelekarspitze =

Mountain in Austria

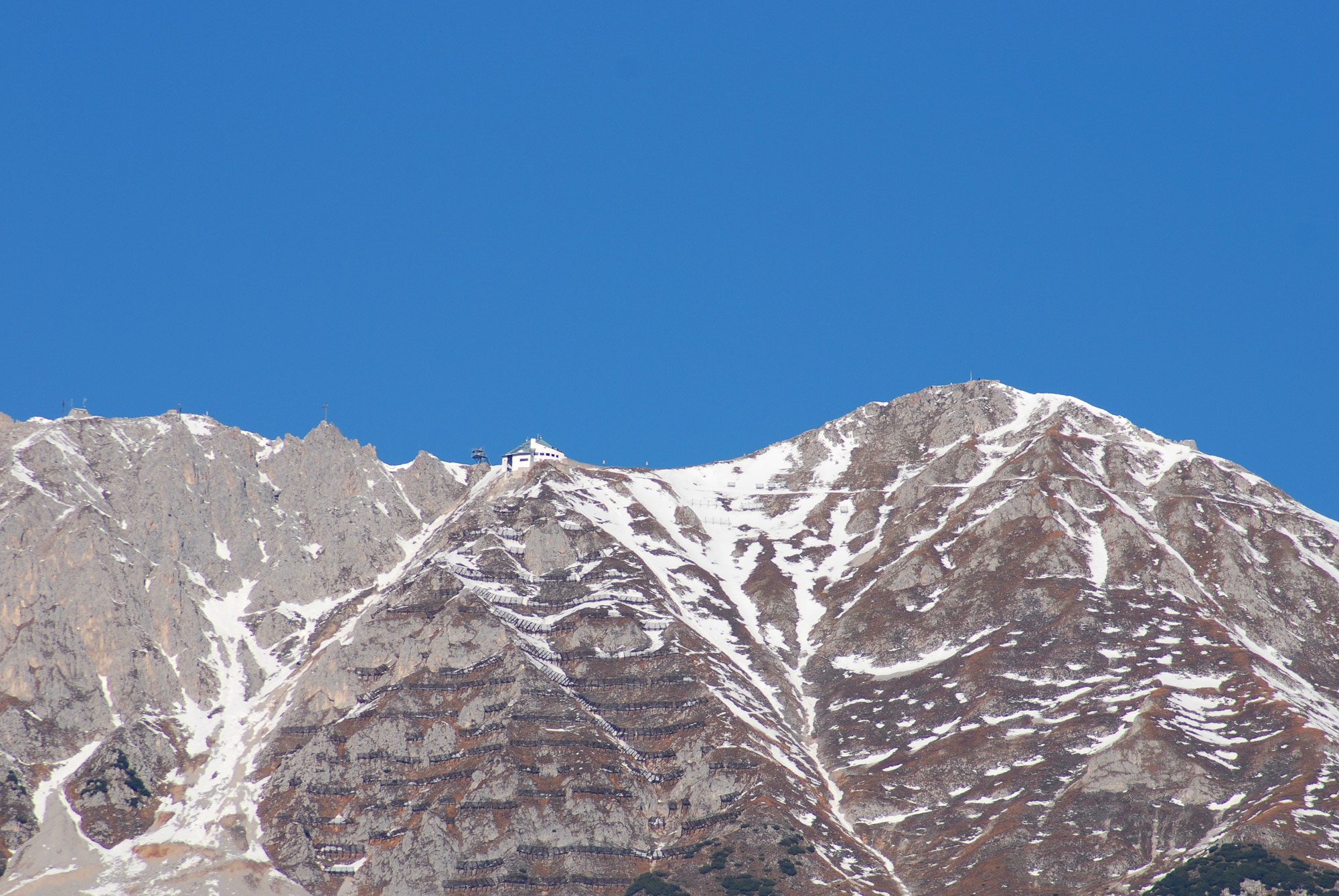
- The North Chain seen from Innsbruck. Centre: the Hafelekar top station, right: (east) the Hafelekarspitze

Highest point
- Elevation: 2,334 m (AA) (7,657 ft)
- Coordinates: 47°18′46″N 11°23′11″E

Geography
- Location within Austria
- Location: Tyrol, Austria
- Parent range: North Chain, Karwendel

Geology
- Rock age: Triassic
- Rock type: Wetterstein limestone

Climbing
- Access: Nordketten Cable Car

The Hafelekarspitze is a mountain in the so-called North Chain (Nordkette) north of Innsbruck in Austria.

== Location and landscape ==
Below and west of the summit is the top station of Hafelekar, the second section of the Nordkette Cable Car at a height of 2,269 m (AA), from where the Hafelekarspitze may be reached in a few minutes by foot on a metalled path.

Not far from there is the Hafelekar Survey Station, a cosmic radiation observatory of the University of Innsbruck, the only one of its kind in Austria. It was here in 1937 that physicists Marietta Blau and Hertha Wambacher using Nuclear emulsion plates, made the first ever observation of nuclear disintegration 'stars' (Zertrümmerungsterne) caused by cosmic rays striking nuclei in the emulsion.

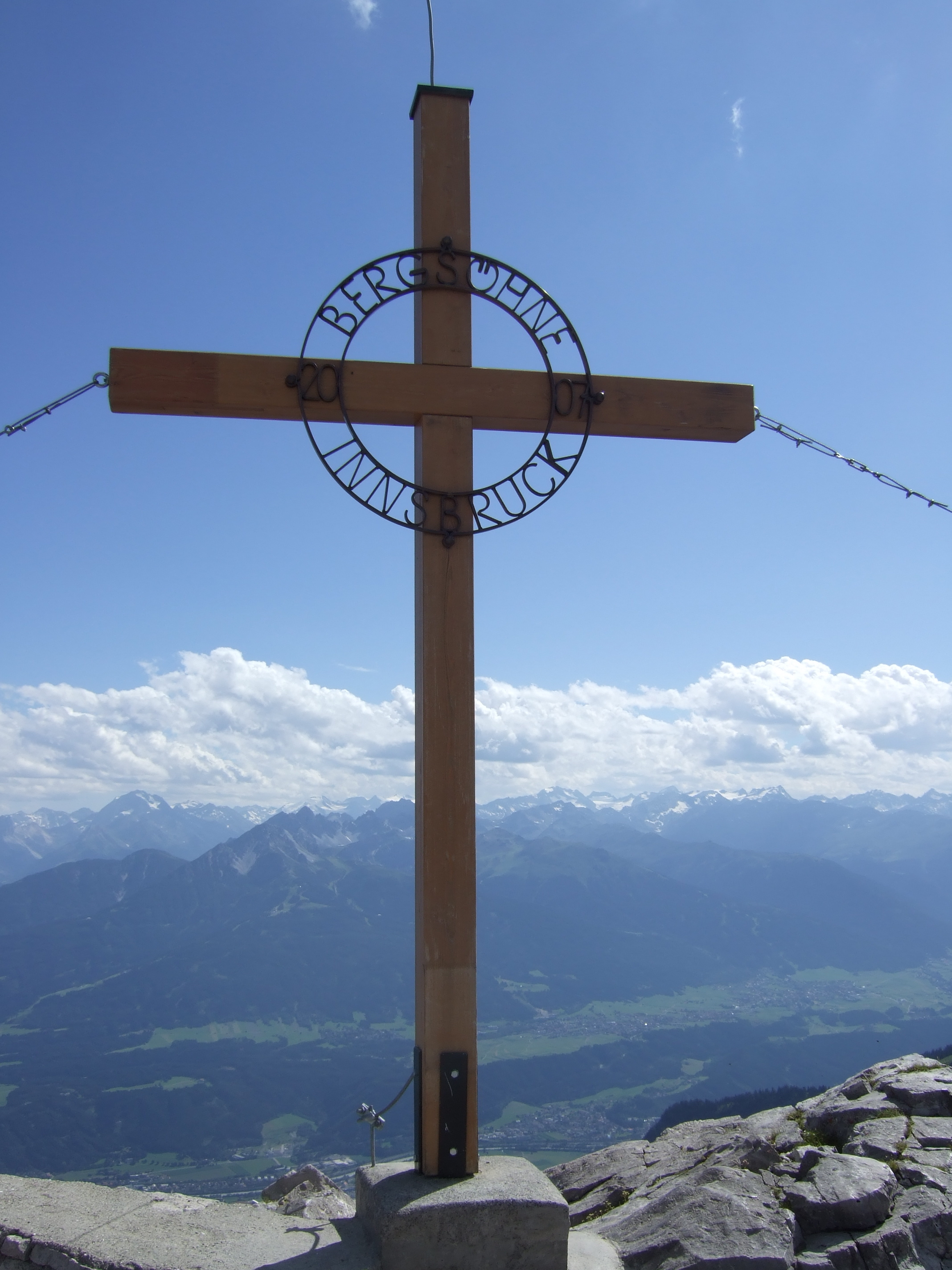
Summit cross on the Hafelekarspitze

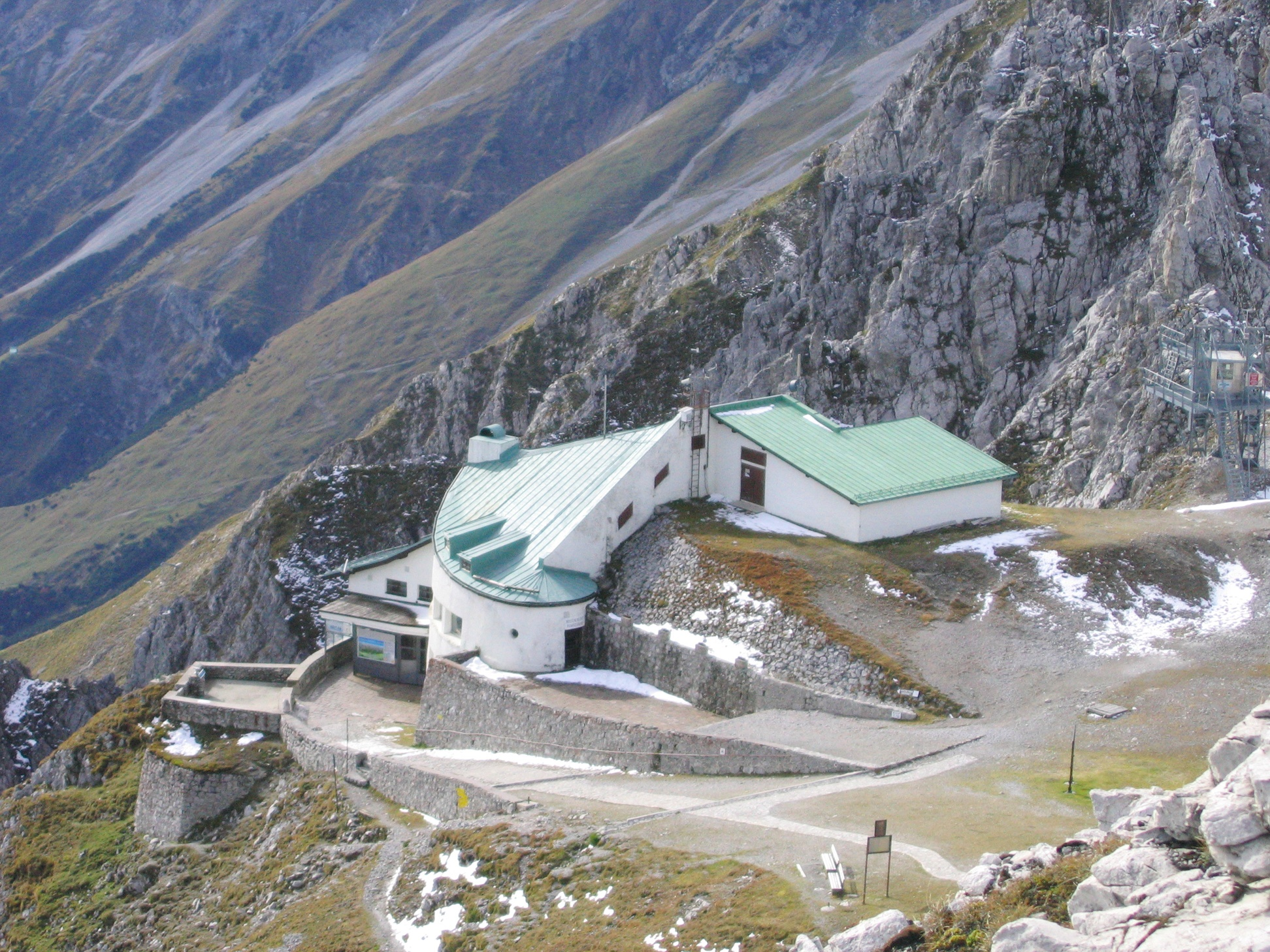
The top station of the Nordketten Cable Car at the Hafelekar cirque

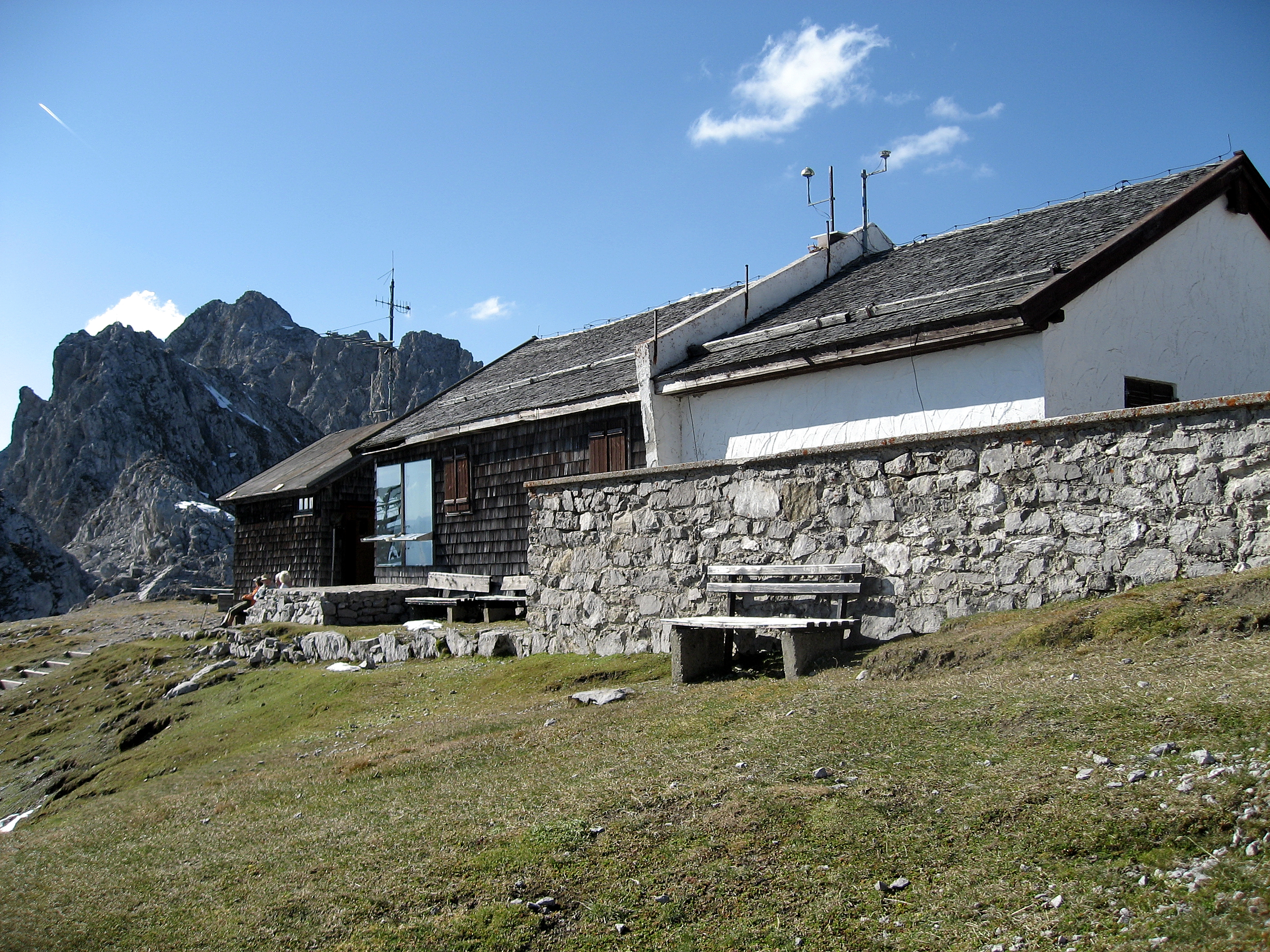
Research station and amateur radio hut (left)

== Routes ==
In summer, the Hafelekarspitze is the start point for mountain hikes and tours along the Goethe Way (Goetheweg) to the Gleirschspitze, the Mandlspitze (2,366 m (AA)), the Gleirschtaler Brandjoch saddle or to the Rumer Spitze. At the eastern end of the Goethe Way is the Pfeis Hut north and below the Rumer Spitze, which is used as a base for the long route via the Wilde Bande-Steig to the Lafatscher Joch (2,081 m (AA)) and the Hallerangerhaus. In winter there is a ski route from the top station to the Seegrube (1,905 m (AA)), the centre of the North Chain ski area.

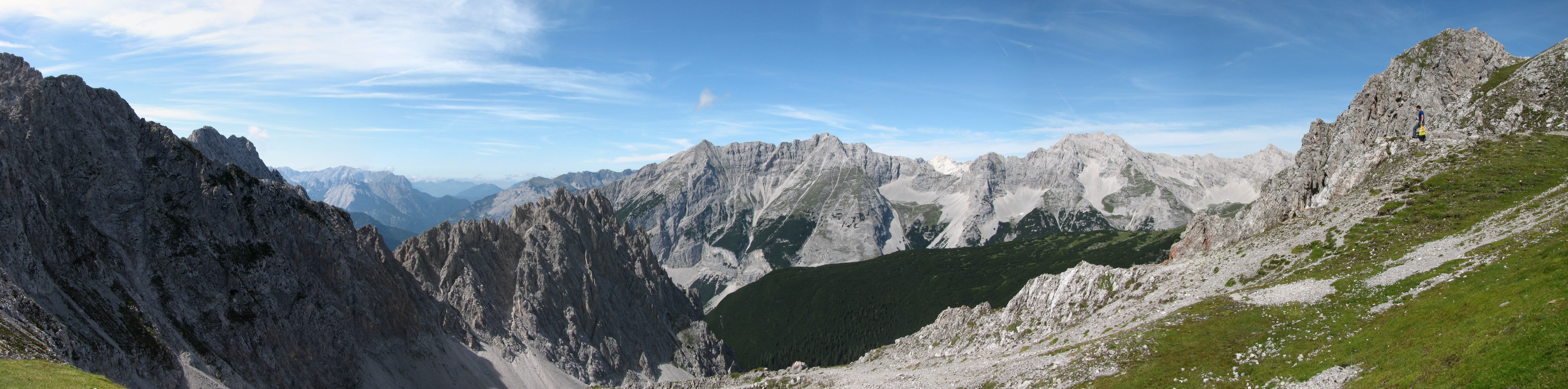
The Tunigskar cirque: view looking north to the Gleirsch-Halltal Chain
