= Marietta Blau =

Austrian nuclear physicist (1894–1970)

- Born: 29 April 1894; Vienna, Austria-Hungary
- Died: 27 January 1970 (aged 75); Vienna, Austria
- Education: University of Vienna
- Known for: Using nuclear emulsions to detect high energy particles
- Scientific career
- Fields: Particle physics
- Workplaces: Curie Institute (Paris); Institute for Radium Research, Vienna; Goethe University Frankfurt
- Thesis: Über die Absorption divergenter γ-Strahlung
- Doctoral advisor: Stefan Meyer
- Doctoral students: Hertha Wambacher

Marietta Blau (29 April 1894 – 27 January 1970) was an Austrian physicist who pioneered the development of photographic nuclear particle detection. She was the first to use nuclear emulsions to detect neutrons, significantly advancing the field of particle physics. For this, she was awarded the Lieben Prize in 1937 by the Austrian Academy of Sciences (ÖAW). Also in 1937, working in a high altitude laboratory, she discovered that cosmic radiation had a disintegrating effect on nuclei.

As a Jew, she had to leave Austria in 1938 when it was threatened with Nazi annexatiion. She continued her research in Oslo, Mexico and the United States before returning to Austria in 1960, where she was soon awarded the ÖAW Erwin Schrödinger Prize.

== Early life and education ==
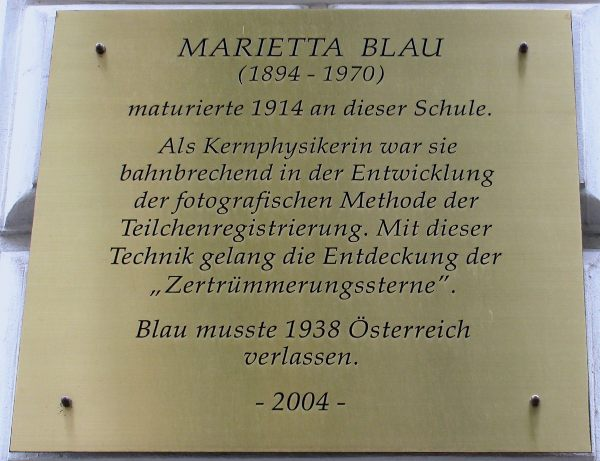
Plaque at the high school for girls in Vienna where Blau matriculated in 1914.

Marietta Blau was born on 29 April 1894 in Vienna to Florentine (née Goldzweig) and Mayer Markus Blau (1854–1919), a barrister who as a music publisher worked with his brother-in-law, Josef Weinberger. The family were Jewish.

Blau was educated first at the Mädchenobergymnasium des Vereins für erweiterte Frauenbildung, a high school for girls operated by the Association for the Extended Education of Women in Vienna. She passed the matura or general certificate of education there in 1914. Blau studied physics and mathematics at the University of Vienna from 1914 to 1918. In March 1919, she earned a PhD in connection with her research on the absorption of gamma radiation. Blau's thesis was approved by F.S. Exner and Stefan Meyer.

== Early career ==
From 1919 to 1923, Blau held several positions in industrial and university research institutions in Austria and Germany. In 1921, she moved to Berlin to work at Fürstenau, Eppens & Co., a manufacturer of x-ray tubes, followed by a post as assistant at the Institute for Medical Physics at the University of Frankfurt am Main. From 1923, she worked as an unpaid scientist at her Institut für Radiumforschung at the ÖAW in Vienna. A stipend from the Austrian Association of University Women made it possible for her to undertake research in Göttingen and Paris (1932/1933). In 1933, Blau spent a short period in Paris as a student of Marie Curie and as a researcher at the Radium Institute.

From 1923 until 1938, Blau undertook research and developed various techniques and processes in connection with nuclear emulsions. In particular, she sought to identify alpha-particles and protons and determine their energy based on the characteristics of the tracks they left in emulsions. In this connection, she developed a photographic emulsion technique used in the study of cosmic rays. As a result, she became the first scientist to use nuclear emulsions to detect neutrons. For this work, Blau and her former student Hertha Wambacher received the Lieben Prize from the Austrian Academy of Sciences in 1937. The same year, she gained even more significance when together with Wambacher she discovered "disintegration stars" in photographic plates that had been exposed to cosmic radiation at an altitude of 2,300 metres (≈7,500 feet) above sea level, following work at the elevated research station established by Victor Hess on the Hafelekar peak. She discovered that the stars result from the patterns of particle tracks from nuclear reactions (spallation events) of cosmic-ray particles with nuclei from the photographic emulsion.

As antisemitism grew in Austria during the late 1930s, Jewish researchers faced expulsion from their positions. Blau was no exception. Following pressure from Georg Stettner, the director of the Institut für Radiumforschung, who was also a Nazi sympathiser, she was invited to spend a term at the University of Oslo.

== As an emigrant ==
Ellen Gleditsch, who had worked with Blau at Marie Curie's laboratory in Paris, had heard of the difficulties Blau was facing with Nazi sympathisers in Austria. She therefore invited her to spend a few months at her institute in Oslo. By chance, Blau left on 12 March 1938, the eve of the Anschluss. The following day, the Anschluss resulted in Hitler's full annexation of Austria. On the way to Oslo, to safeguard her interests, she gave a lecture at the Niels Bohr Institute in Copenhagen. She remained in Oslo for a number of months where she continued to work and publish. In November 1938, she met her mother in London and then travelled on to North America.

As a result of the influence of Albert Einstein, she eventually obtained a teaching position at the Instituto Politécnico Nacional in Mexico City and later at Universidad Michoacana de San Nicolás de Hidalgo.

While she was on her way to Mexico City, Nazi officials seized her photographic plates at the airport in Hamburg.

Although she was able to teach in Mexico, she was unable to carry out any further research in her field of interest. While there, Blau was personally acquainted with Guido Beck. She was able to move to the United States in 1944.

== Post-war ==
In the United States, Blau worked in industry until 1948, then (until 1960) at Columbia University, Brookhaven National Laboratory and the University of Miami. At these institutions, she was responsible for the application of the photographic method of particle detection in high-energy experiments with particle accelerators.

From 1950 to 1957, she was nominated unsuccessfully several times for the Nobel Prize in Physics and once for the Nobel Prize in Chemistry by Erwin Schrödinger and Hans Thirring.

In 1960, Blau returned to Austria and conducted scientific work at the Institute for Radium Research until 1964, again without pay. She headed a working group analysing particle-track photographs from experiments at CERN and supervised a dissertation in the field. In 1962, she received the Erwin Schrödinger Prize from the Austrian Academy of Sciences, but a related attempt to make her a corresponding member of the academy was not successful.

== Legacy ==
The quantum optical ground station ‘Marietta Blau’ is a telescope run by the University of Innsbruck.

The Victor Franz Hess measuring station at Hafelekar (2,300 m) above Innsbruck with the Marietta Blau quantum-optical ground station, built in 2025, in the background.

In 1950, Cecil Powell received the Nobel Prize in Physics for work (partially) based on the work of Blau, specifically the development of the photographic film method for particle detection and the discovery of the meson.

The Marietta Blau-Stipendium is a government scholarship (of the Bundesministeriums für Frauen, Wissenschaft und Forschung)

Marietta-Blau-Saal is a room in University Vienna sometimes used for coffee-breaks.

Marietta-Blau-Gasse in area 22 of Vienna is a street name.

Marietta Blau Institute for Particle Physics (merger of Stefan Meyer Institute for Subatomic Physics and the Institute of High Energy Physics (HEPHY)).

== Death ==
Marietta Blau died in Vienna from cancer on 27 January 1970. Her illness was related to her unprotected handling of radioactive substances as well as her cigarette smoking over many years. No obituary appeared in any scientific publication. Blau was interred in Group 6 of the new section for Jewish burials of Wiener Zentralfriedhof at row 2, grave 16.

== Works ==
=== 1910s ===
On the absorption of divergent γ-radiation:

- Blau, Marietta. "Über die Absorption divergenter γ-Strahlung." Sitzungsberichte der Kaiserl. Akademie der Wissenschaften in Wien, Mathematisch-naturwissenschaftliche Klasse, Abteillung IIa, 127 (1918): 1253–1279.

=== 1920s ===
- Blau, Marietta. "Über die photographische Wirkung naturliche H-Strahlen." Sitzungsberichte Akademie der Wissenschaften in Wien, Mathematisch-naturwissenschaftliche Klasse, Abteillung IIa, 134 (1925): 427–436.
- Blau, Marietta and Rona, Elisabeth. "Ionisation durch alpha-Strahlen." Sitzungsberichte Akademie der Wissenschaften in Wien, Mathematisch-naturwissenschaftliche Klasse, Abteillung IIa, 135 (1926): 573–585.
- Blau, Marietta. "Die photographische Wirkung von H-Strahlen aus Paraffin und Aluminium." Zeitschrift für Physik, 34 (1925): 285–295.
- Blau, Marietta. "Über die photographische Wirkung naturliche H-Strahlen." Sitzungsberichte Akademie der Wissenschaften in Wien, Mathematisch-naturwissenschaftliche Klasse, Abteillung IIa, 136 (1927): 469–480.
- Blau, Marietta. "Über die photographische Wirkung von H-Strahlen aus Paraffin und Atomfragmenten." Zeitschrift für Physik, 48 (1928): 751–764.
- Blau, Marietta. "Über photographische Intensitätsmessungen von Poloniumpräparaten." Sitzungsberichte Akademie der Wissenschaften in Wien, Mathematisch-naturwissenschaftliche Klasse, Abteillung IIa, 137 (1928): 259–268.

=== 1930s ===
- Blau, Marietta and Rona, Elisabeth. "Anwendungen der Chamié'schen photographischen Methode zur Prüfung des chemischen Verhaltens von Polonium." Sitzungsberichte Akademie der Wissenschaften in Wien, Mathematisch-naturwissenschaftliche Klasse, Abteillung IIa, 139 (1930): 275–279.
- Blau, Marietta. "Über photographische Untersuchungen mit radioactiven Strahlungen." In Zehn Jahre Forschung auf dem Physikalisch-Medizinischen Grenzgebiet, edited by F. Dessauer. 390–98. Leipzig: Georg Thieme, 1931.
- Blau, Marietta and Kara-Michailova, Elisabeth. "Über die durchdringende Strahlung des Poloniums." Sitzungsberichte Akademie der Wissenschaften in Wien, Mathematisch-naturwissenschaftliche Klasse, Abteillung IIa, 140 (1931): 615–622.
- Blau, Marietta and Wambacher, Hertha."Über das Verhalten konloser Emulsionen gegenüber Alpha Partikeln." Sitzungsberichte Akademie der Wissenschaften in Wien, Mathematisch-naturwissenschaftliche Klasse, Abteillung IIa, 141 (1932): 467–474.
- Blau, Marietta and Wambacher, Hertha. "Über Versuche durch Neutronen ausgelöste Protonen photographisch nachzuweisen II" Sitzungsberichte Akademie der Wissenschaften in Wien, Mathematisch-naturwissenschaftliche Klasse, Abteillung IIa, 141 (1932): 617–20.
- Blau, Marietta and Wambacher, Hertha. "Über Versuche durch Neutronen ausgelöste Protonen photographisch nachzuweisen." Sitzungsberichte Akademie der Wissenschaften in Wien, Mathematisch-naturwissenschaftliche Klasse, Abteillung IIa, 141 (1932): 180.

=== 1940s ===
- Blau, Marietta and Feuer, I. "Radioactive Light Sources." Journal of the Optical Society of America, 36 no. 10 (1946): 576–580.
- Blau, Marietta and Dreyfus, B. "The Multiplier Phott-Tube in Radioactive Measurements." The Review of Scientific Instruments, 16, no. 9 (1945): 245–248.
- Blau, Marietta and Carlin, J. R. "Industrial Applications of Radioactivity." Electronics, 21 no. 1–4 (1948): 78–82.
- Blau, Marietta and Smith, J. E. "Beta-ray Measurements and Units." Nucleonics, 2 no. 6 (1948): 67–74.

=== 1950s ===
Report on the discovery of stars produced by cosmic rays:

- Blau, Marietta. "Bericht über die Entdeckung der durch kosmische Strahlung erzeugten Sterne." Sitzungsberichte Akademie der Wissenschaften in Wien, Mathematisch-naturwissenschaftliche Klasse, Abteillung IIa, 159 (1950): 53–57.

== See also ==
- List of women associated with Marie Curie and Irène Joliot-Curie
- Timeline of women in science
- The Matilda effect
- Giuseppe Occhialini

== Literature ==
- Robert Rosner & Brigitte Strohmaier (eds.) (2003) Marietta Blau – Sterne der Zertrümmerung. Biographie einer Wegbereiterin der modernen Teilchenphysik. Böhlau, Vienna ISBN 3-205-77088-9 (in German)
- Brigitte Strohmaier & Robert Rosner (2006) Marietta Blau – Stars of Disintegration. Biography of a pioneer of particle physics. Ariadne, Riverside, California ISBN 978-1-57241-147-0
- Halpen, Leopold E. (1997). "Marietta Blau". In Rayner-Canham, Marelene F.; Rayner-Canham, Geoffrey (eds.). A Devotion to Their Science: Pioneer Women of Radioactivity. Montréal: McGill-Queen's University Press. pp. 196–204. ISBN 978-0-77351-642-7.
- Leopold Halpern & Maurice Shapiro (2006) "Marietta Blau" in Out of the Shadows: Contributions of Twentieth-Century Women to Physics, Nina Byers and Gary Williams, ed., Cambridge University Press ISBN 978-0-521-82197-1.
- Rentetzi, Maria (1970–1980). "Blau, Marietta". Dictionary of Scientific Biography. Vol. 19. New York: Charles Scribner's Sons. pp. 298–302. ISBN 978-0-684-10114-9.
