= Hans Tropsch =

German chemist (1889–1935)

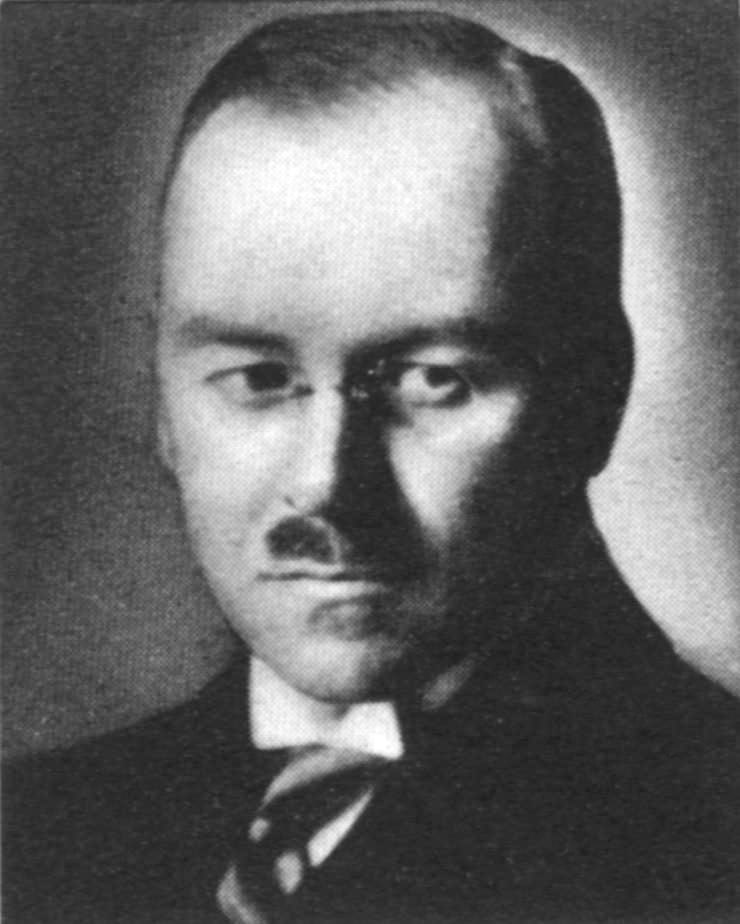
- Born: October 7, 1889; Plan, Austria-Hungary (now Czech Republic)
- Died: October 8, 1935 (aged 46); Essen, Germany
- Education: German Charles-Ferdinand University in Prague
- Known for: Fischer–Tropsch process
- Scientific career
- Fields: Organic chemistry
- Workplaces: Kaiser Wilhelm Institute for Coal Research; Institute for Coal Research Prague; Armour Institute of Technology
- Doctoral advisor: Hans Meyer

Hans Tropsch (October 7, 1889 – October 8, 1935) was a chemist responsible, along with Franz Fischer, for the development of the Fischer–Tropsch process.

== Life ==
Tropsch was born in Plan bei Marienbad, Sudet-German Bohemia at that time part of Austria-Hungary now Czech Republic. He studied at the German Charles-Ferdinand University in Prague and the German Technical University in Prague from 1907 until 1913. He received his Ph.D for work with Hans Meyer.

Tropsch worked in a dye factory in Mülheim in 1916–1917, then for a few months at the Kaiser Wilhelm Institute for Coal Research. From 1917 to 1920, Tropsch worked in a tar distillery of the Rütgers company in Niederau, but returned to the Kaiser Wilhelm Institute for Coal Research in 1920, staying until 1928. There he worked with both Franz Fischer and Otto Roelen. It was during this time that the ground-breaking inventions of the Fischer–Tropsch process were patented.

In 1928, Tropsch became professor at the new Institute for Coal Research in Prague. He later accepted a position in the United States at the Laboratories of Universal Oil Products and the Armour Institute of Technology in Chicago in 1931. Due to a severe illness Tropsch returned to Germany in 1935, where he died shortly after his arrival, in a hospital in Essen.
