= Hans Benndorf =

Austrian physicist (1870–1953)

Hans Benndorf (13 December 1870 – 11 February 1953) was an Austrian physicist. He made several contributions in the field of seismology and in his research of atmospheric electricity.

== Life and career ==
Benndorf was born on 13 December 1870 in Zürich. He was the son of archaeologist Otto Benndorf (1838–1907) and the grandson of physiologist Rudolf Wagner (1805–1864).

In 1895 he earned his doctorate from the University of Vienna, and subsequently became an assistant to Franz Serafin Exner (1849–1926). In 1904 he became an associate professor of meteorology at the University of Graz. In 1910 he replaced Leopold Pfaundler (1839–1920) as professor of physics, a position he kept until 1936 (forced retirement). In 1945 he resumed his duties in physics at Graz.

In 1927 he was elected as a full member of the Austrian Academy of Sciences, and from 1932 to 1934 was university rector. From 1924 he worked closely with geophysicist Alfred Wegener (1880–1930) at Graz, also maintaining professional ties with physicist Victor Franz Hess (1883–1964) and climatologist Victor Conrad (1876–1962) during his career. With Hess, he co-authored a comprehensive treatise on atmospheric electricity (1928).

In 1907, he founded a seismological observatory at the physical institute in Graz, and during the same year was awarded the Ignaz Lieben Prize for his work on the propagation of seismic waves.

In a mine shaft at Příbram, he was able to differentiate between long-distance earthquakes and local microseismic activity with the use of seismometers. Also, he was the first scientist to solve the problem involving the refraction of seismic rays in spherical layers. The term Benndorfscher Satz (Benndorf's relationship) is used to describe the constancy of the ray parameter across the spherical layers.

He died on 11 February 1953 in Graz, at the age of 82.

A device known as a "Benndorf electrometer" is used for atmospheric electrical measurements.
