= Helmut Paul =

Austrian physicist

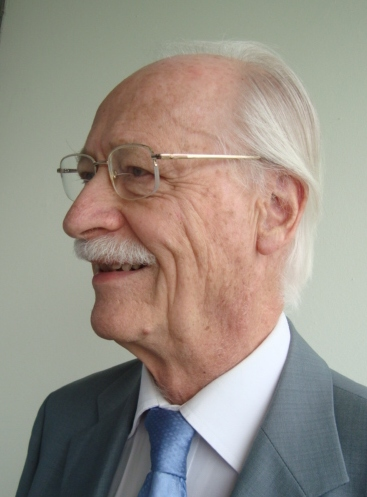
- Helmut Paul, 2014
- Born: 4 November 1929; Vienna
- Died: 21 December 2015 (aged 86); Linz
- Education: Purdue University
- Known for: Internet table of stopping power data for positive ions
- Scientific career
- Fields: Nuclear physics, Atomic physics
- Workplaces: Institute for Radium Research, Vienna, CERN, Reactor Center Seibersdorf, Brookhaven National Laboratory, University of Linz
- Thesis: On the attenuation of the angular correlation of gamma rays resulting from the decay of the 181Ta nucleus by time varying fields in liquid solutions (1954)
- Doctoral advisor: Rolf M. Steffen
- Website: www-nds.iaea.org/stopping

Helmut Paul (born 4 November 1929 in Vienna; died 21 December 2015 in Linz) was an Austrian nuclear and atomic physicist. He taught as a full professor of experimental physics at the University of Linz from 1971 to 1996. Since then he was professor emeritus. He was Rector of the University from 1974 to 1977.

== Life and work ==
Helmut Paul was born in 1929 as child of Hans and Ilona Paul (née Just) in Vienna. Both parents were of middle class origin. The father was employed in the accounting and financial sector of the Siemens company, the mother worked first in the household and later as an interpreter in the American Embassy in Vienna.

Helmut Paul was an excellent pupil, and it became soon apparent that he was gifted in mathematics. He received his secondary education (Gymnasium) partly in Berlin, partly in Gmunden, Upper Austria, and got his Matura (Abitur) in Vienna in 1947. Paul began the study of physics and mathematics at the University of Vienna in the fall of 1947. Among his professors in mathematics were the world-renowned mathematicians Johann Radon and Edmund Hlawka; there were friendly private relations to Radon and his family. Among his professors in physics in Vienna were Hans Thirring, Felix Ehrenhaft and later the nuclear physicist Berta Karlik.

Paul spent the year 1950/51 with a fellowship from the US State Department at the Graduate School of Purdue University in Lafayette, USA. Paul wrote a master's thesis on the efficiency of Geiger counters and received at the conclusion of this academic year the degree of Master of Science. The supervisor of this thesis, Professor Rolf M. Steffen, told Paul that he would gladly be willing to supervise Paul's doctoral studies.

Already in spring 1952, Paul was back at Purdue University, this time for doctoral studies (Ph.D.), which he concluded in December 1954 with a thesis "On the attenuation of the angular correlation of gamma rays resulting from the decay of the ^{181}Ta nucleus by time varying fields in liquid solutions". After returning to Vienna, Paul obtained a half time position at the Institute for Radium Research, Vienna, of the Austrian Academy of Sciences, which was directed by Professor Karlik. This employment was of great significance for Paul privately as well: He met the secretary of Professor Karlik, Maria Elisabeth Mathis (1931 - 2008), and fell in love with her. Helmut Paul und Elisabeth Mathis got engaged in December 1956; the wedding took place in June 1957. In time, three children came from this marriage.

In October 1957, Paul took on a Ford Foundation fellowship at CERN in Geneva which Berta Karlik hat procured for him. At CERN, the first particle accelerator, the synchrocyclotron, had just started operation, and Paul got the chance to work on the first experiment that was carried out with this machine. It consisted of the search for the rare decay of the charged pion into an electron and a neutrino, which was indeed found to occur with a probability of 0.012% relative to the normal decay into muon and neutrino. After two very fruitful years in Geneva, Paul went a third time to Purdue, this time as a visiting professor, supplying for Professor Steffen. There he studied a beta-gamma angular correlation. In the meantime, a new nuclear research center was established in Seibersdorf near Vienna, where close colleagues from the Radium Institute (Rupert Patzelt) and the 2nd Physics Institute of Vienna University (Peter Weinzierl) were active. Weinzierl offered him a position in Seibersdorf, und Paul accepted. Paul was employed at the Seibersdorf center from October 1960 to March 1971, interrupted by a fourth stay in the USA, this time at the Brookhaven National Laboratory on Long Island (1965/66).

In Seibersdorf, Paul had a magnetic intermediate-image beta ray spectrometer at his disposal. With it, he measured the shapes of beta ray spectra. Above all, he investigated the spectrometer itself, in order to show that the measured shapes are not due to distortions produced by the apparatus. An essential part of his work was devoted to the measurement of the electron-neutrino angular correlation in neutron decay, a difficult project that went on for years and was finally concluded when Paul was no longer at Seibersdorf. In Brookhaven, Paul attempted to find a possible parity admixture in an excited state of a radioactive hafnium isotope, which would manifest itself by a small circular polarization of the emitted gamma radiation. The result was negative: there was no circular polarization. While at Brookhaven, Paul also published a summarizing article on the shapes of beta spectra which he had already begun at Seibersdorf. In 1970, Paul received a call to the young University of Social Sciences, Economics and Business in Linz (from 1975: Johannes Kepler University of Linz) for the newly established chair of Experimental Physics. Paul had the chance to cooperate in the planning of his professorship even prior to beginning his office. Since no chair for experimental physics had existed before, everything had to be built up from scratch (teaching, laboratories, electronics, mechanical workshop).

Paul started his professorship on 1 April 1971. Soon an electrostatic particle accelerator for 700 keV protons was installed (later also a tandem accelerator), und in collaboration with O. Benka, D. Semrad, A. Kropf and others, atomic physics experiments were started. To make the Linz group internationally known, Paul started to organize international workshops: at first three on theories of ionisation of inner atomic shells. A table of cross sections for K shell ionisation by light ions, established together with J. Muhr and O. Bolik, resp., is available in the Internet. Later, Paul's interests turned toward the stopping power of matter for charged particles, a subject on which D. Semrad, P. Bauer, R. Golser and other coworkers had already worked intensively for some time. He initiated again three international workshops on this theme. In Juli 1995, Paul's group initiated the Sixteenth International Conference on Atomic Collisions in Solids in Linz, with Paul as Chairman; D. Semrad, P. Bauer and O. Benka were editors of the conference volume. The years in Linz were a very successful time for Paul. Apart from teaching and research, Paul's managing qualities were appreciated and asked for. Paul's equilibrated and confidence-inspiring personality contributed to the fact that Paul became a Senator at the University as early as 1972. In 1973 he was elected Dean of the newly established Faculty of natural and technical sciences, and in 1974 there came the election to the office of the Rector of the university for three years until 1977. In 1985, he was again elected Dean for two years.

Paul's interest (as professor emeritus since 1996) now turned also to themes of medical physics. He was co-author of several reports of the International Commission on Radiation Units and Measurements (ICRU) and of a report of the International Atomic Energy Agency. Even after his retirement from active university duty in 1996, Paul received invitations to specialized conferences abroad, notably to the USA (last time 2012), but also to Brazil (2011).

In 1990, Paul began to establish a collection of all published Stopping Power Data for light Ions, with many graphical displays, and to install it in the Internet. In the meantime he has extended this collection to all positive ions, and he kept it updated till his death. It was important to him to compare these data statistically with various theories, in order to judge the quality of the data (and of the theories). His private interests included extended travels, the participation in a church choir and work on the genealogy of his family.

== Selected publications ==
- List of publications since 2000, and autobiography
