= Elizaveta Karamihailova =

Bulgarian physicist

Elisabeth Ivanova Kara-Michailova
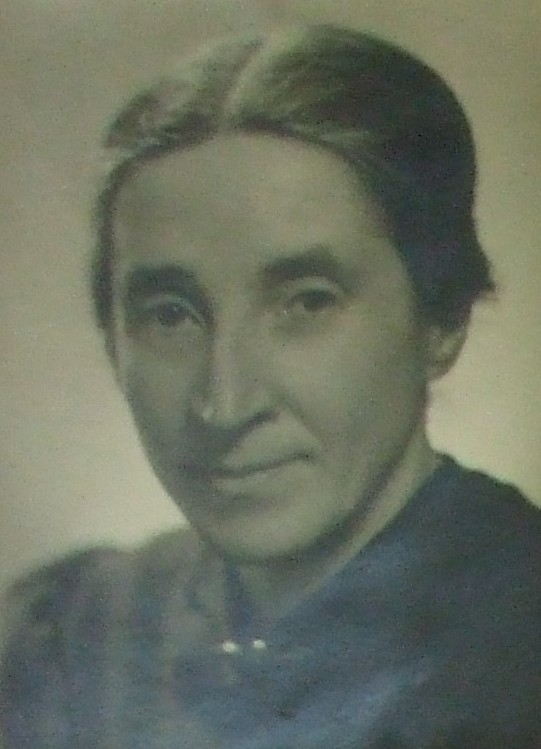
- Born: 3 September 1897; Vienna, Austria-Hungary
- Died: 24 April 1968 (aged 70); Sofia, Bulgaria
- Education: University of Vienna
- Known for: Cosmic ray, radioluminescence and ionization studies
- Scientific career
- Fields: nuclear physics

Elisabeth Ivanova Kara-Michailova (Bulgarian: Елисавета Иванова Карамихайлова), alternatively Elisabeth Karamichailova was a Bulgarian physicist of a Bulgarian father and an English mother. She was among the handful of female nuclear physics pioneers at the beginning of the 20th century, established the first practical courses of particle physics in Bulgaria and was the first woman to hold a professorial title in the country.

== Early life ==
Elisabeth Karamichailova was born in 1897 in Vienna, to Ivan Mikhaylov and Mary Slade. Both her parents had studied at the University of Vienna - Ivan, born in Shumen, was studying medicine, while Mary, a native of Minster Lovell in Oxfordshire, studied music. After her father graduated in 1907, the family remained in Vienna for two years before moving to Bulgaria in 1909 where they acquired a spacious house in central Sofia.

Karamichailova grew up in both an artistic and scientific environment. Her father turned the upper floor of his house into a Red Cross Hospital where he treated his patients without requiring payment. She enrolled in the Sofia Girls' College and graduated there in 1917, after which she departed to study at the University of Vienna.

== Studies in radioactivity ==
In 1922, Karamichailova graduated as a PhD in Physics and Mathematics. She wrote her thesis, entitled "About Electric Figures on Different Materials, Especially On Crystals" under the direction of Karl Przibram. Karamichailova continued her work at the Institute for Radium Studies afterwards, becoming particularly interested in radioluminescence. She cooperated with Marietta Blau in the study of polonium, and later researched methods for neutron bombardment of thorium. Karamichailova simultaneously attended courses in electronic and radio engineering at the Vienna Polytechnic. In the autumn of 1923 she returned briefly to Bulgaria and worked as a "guest fellow" at the Physics Institute of Sofia University. Soon Karamichailova went back to Vienna and began her work on the transmutation of light elements under alpha radiation at the Institute of Radium Studies. In 1931, Karamichailova and Marietta Blau observed a specific type of previously unknown radiation emitted from polonium, which would later be confirmed by James Chadwick as neutron radiation, leading to his discovery of neutrons.

In 1933, the position of "research assistant", under which she worked in Vienna, was terminated. Karamichailova had to continue her research without tuition until 1935, when she obtained a 3-year Alfred Yarrow Research Fellowship from Girton College, Cambridge. She was subsequently employed at the Cavendish Laboratory. In December 1937, she applied for a position as a docent in Experimental Physics at Sofia University. Karamichailova managed to extend her scholarship by 10 months, and finally returned to Bulgaria in 1939, where she was appointed as a docent of Experimental Atomistics with Radioactivity at SU. She set up an atomic physics course, introducing the latest knowledge from her studies in Austria and England and some of her equipment. The outbreak of World War II halted any further expansion of nuclear research activities.

Her studies now involved cosmic rays as well. Karamichailova used photographic plates to continue her work in this field, which she had collaborated on with Marietta Blau. She attempted to continue the study of multiple ionization, but this was impossible without the sophisticated equipment she had access to while in England. When Karamichailova began her work in Sofia in 1940, she only had a microscope and a dark room.

== Later life ==
After the left-wing uprising in 1944, the newly established far-left authorities in Bulgaria labeled Karamichailova as "unreliable" due to her anti-communist views and prohibited her from going abroad. She continued her work in the field of radioactivity in Bulgaria, initially at Sofia University and later, at the Bulgarian Academy of Sciences, where she received the title of "professor". Karamichailova died of cancer in 1968, most likely from long-term radiation exposure.

== Sources ==
- Rayner-Canham, Marelene F. (1997). A Devotion to Their Science: Pioneer Women of Radioactivity. McGill-Queen's Press - MQUP. pp. 205–208. ISBN 0941901157.
- Potocnik, Janez (2009). Women in Science (PDF). European Commission. pp. 143–145. ISBN 9789279114861.
