= Exner function =

Parameter in atmospheric modeling

The Exner function is a parameter used in atmospheric modeling. Depending on the application, the Exner function may be defined as

$$\Pi = c_p \left( \frac{p}{p_0} \right)^{R_d/c_p} = c_p \frac{T}{\theta}$$

or as a non-dimensional form

$$\Pi = \left( \frac{p}{p_0} \right)^{R_d/c_p} = \frac{T}{\theta}$$

where $p_0$ is a standard reference surface pressure (usually taken as 1000 hPa, but sometimes as the surface pressure); $R_d$ is the specific gas constant for dry air; $c_p$ is the specific heat capacity of dry air at constant pressure; $T$ is the absolute temperature; and $\theta$ is the potential temperature. The non-dimensional form can be used as a vertical coordinate in some numerical weather prediction applications, resulting in a simpler mathematical formulation compared to using pressure as the vertical coordinate. It is named after Felix Maria von Exner-Ewarten.

== See also ==
- Barometric formula
- Climate model
- Euler equations
- Fluid dynamics
- General circulation model
- Numerical weather prediction
- Primitive equations
