= Ski route =

Unprepared ski run

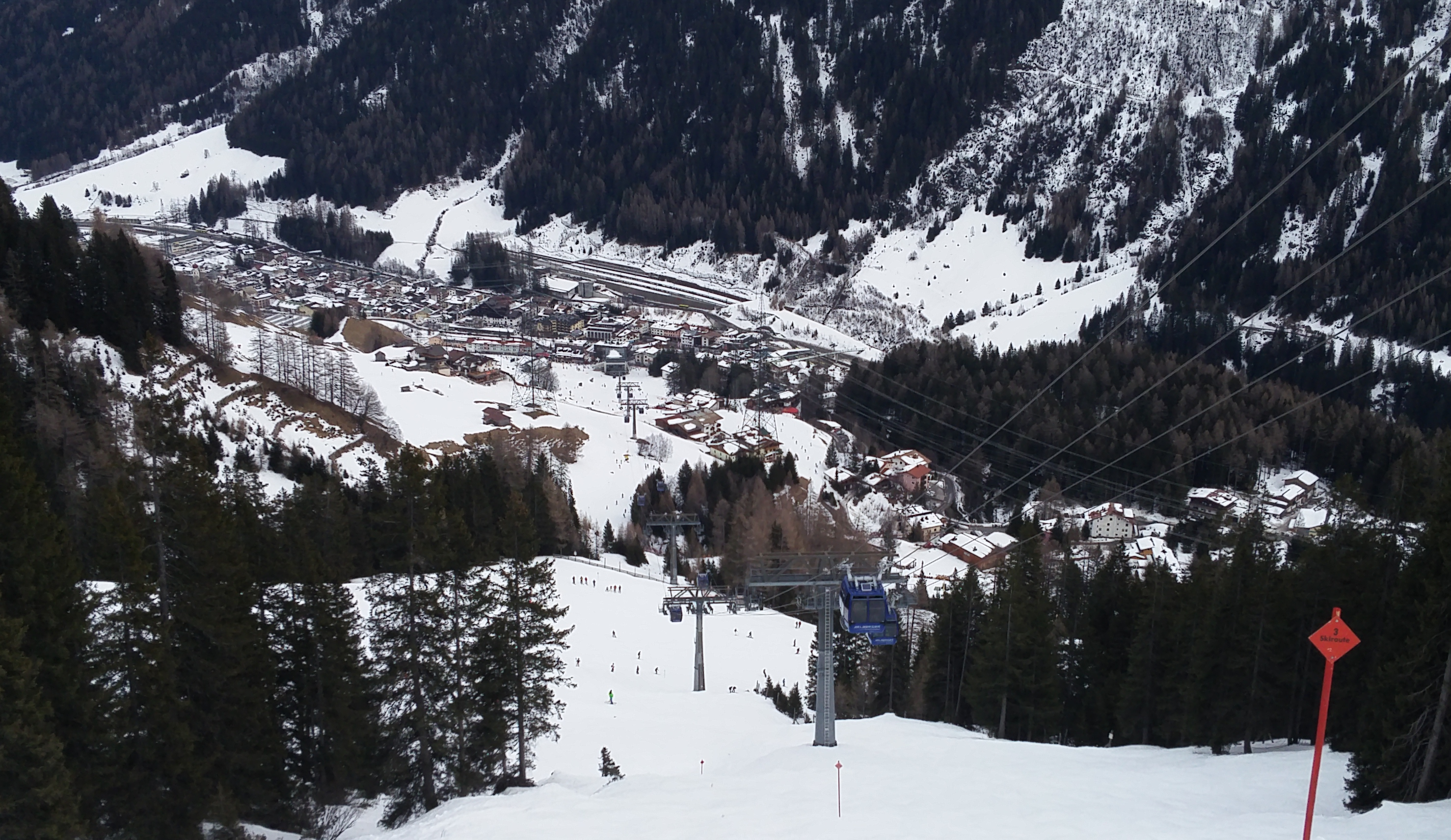
Skiroute following the lift at St. Anton am Arlberg

A ski route (German: Skiroute) or ski trail is an officially signed piste or ski run that is cleared for skiing but is not usually managed or prepared by snowcats or other equipment.

== Description ==
Usually known as a Skiroute in Austria, Germany or Switzerland, ski routes are properly signed downhill routes for skiers. However, they are not normally groomed by ski piste equipment. As a result, they are not recommended for beginners. In addition to being unprepared, ski routes generally follow a challenging course, often with sheets of ice, rocks, bushes, snowdrifts or other obstacles, and they are often steep. In other places, these slopes are narrow.

An advantage of ski routes is that they allow off-piste skiing in deep powder snow without significant risk from avalanches or natural obstacles. Ski routes may also include mogul routes.

== Signage ==
=== Alpine countries ===
Ski route waymark

In the Alps, ski routes are usually signed with orange-red diamonds, often surrounded by a black border and with the route number and word Skiroute marked on it.

=== Poland ===
In Poland, it is customary to mark the ski route with three horizontal stripes on trees, walls, rocks, and signposts (set up in open areas). The two outer stripes are orange, while the middle one is filled with black, red, green or blue paint. The basic sign measures 9x15 cm.

The colour of the route is related to its skiing difficulty, unlike the markings of hiking trails. The difficulty levels are determined by taking into account the slope of the route in the longitudinal profile. Factors such as the terrain, forest cover, buildings and other objects located in the immediate vicinity are also important. The final degree of difficulty of the route is determined by GOPR or TOPR. The markings are as follows:

Difficulty level	Routes	Colour marking	Slope in the longitudinal profile	
Difficulty level	Routes	Colour marking	medium	maximum
A	very easy	green (not valid since 2011)	up to 15% (9°)	21% (12°)
B	easy	blue	17-21% (10-12°)	30% (17°)
C	difficult	red	21-29% (12-16°)	40% (22°)
D	very difficult	black	over 29% (16°)	53% (28°)

Marked ski trails may be accompanied by appropriate tourist information: boards with a description of the trail, its length, as well as warning signs for skiers (triangular with a yellow background).

== Examples ==
- Dammkar Ski Route
- Vallee Blanche Ski Route
- Lange Zug Ski Route
- Route from the Zygmuntówka Hut on the Jugowska Pass to the Andrzejówka Hut ( red route}

== Bibliography ==
- Riedel, Christian and Jörg Birkel (2008). Wintersportgeräte: Richtig auswählen, sicher nutzen. Mit Sicherheitshinweisen [Winter Sports Equipment: Select Correctly, Use Safely. With Safety Guidance]. Berlin, Vienna, Zurich: Beuth. ISBN 978-3-410-16870-6
