= Degradation (geology) =

Lowering of a fluvial surface through erosion

In geology, degradation refers to the lowering of a fluvial surface, such as a stream bed or floodplain, through erosional processes. Degradation is the opposite of aggradation. Degradation is characteristic of channel networks in which either bedrock erosion is taking place, or in systems that are sediment-starved and are therefore entraining more material than they are depositing. When a stream degrades, it leaves behind a fluvial terrace. This can be further classified as a strath terrace—a bedrock terrace that may have a thin mantle of alluvium—if the river is incising through bedrock. These terraces may be dated with methods such as cosmogenic radionuclide dating, OSL dating, and paleomagnetic dating (using reversals in the Earth's magnetic field to constrain the timing of events) to find when a river was at a particular level and how quickly it is downcutting.
