= Stefan Meyer (politician) =

German politician (born 1984)

Member of the Landtag of Bavaria
- Incumbent
- Assumed office 30 October 2023
- Preceded by: Walter Taubeneder
- Constituency: Passau-West

Personal details
- Born: 29 December 1984 (age 41) Vilshofen an der Donau
- Party: Christian Social Union (since 2005)
- Parent: Franz Meyer (father)

Stefan Meyer (born 29 December 1984 in Vilshofen an der Donau) is a German politician serving as a member of the Landtag of Bavaria since 2023. He is the son of Franz Meyer.
