= Hans Leopold Meyer =

Austrian chemist (1871–1942)

- Born: 31 March 1871; Vienna, Austria-Hungary
- Died: 28 November 1942 (aged 71); Theresienstadt concentration camp, Protectorate of Bohemia and Moravia
- Known for: Herzig–Meyer alkimide group determination
- Awards: Lieben Prize (1905)

Hans Leopold Meyer (31 March 1871 – 28 November 1942) was an Austrian chemist. He was the brother of Stefan Meyer who also received the Lieben Prize. Hans Leopold Meyer studied at the Technische Universität Bergakademie Freiberg, Vienna University of Technology and University of Heidelberg he received his PhD in 1894. He started as a lecturer at the Vienna University of Technology, and professor at the German University in Prague. He was a member of the German Academy of Sciences Leopoldina and he received the Lieben Prize in 1905, seven years before his younger brother Stefan Meyer received the prize in 1913. He died in the Theresienstadt concentration camp end of 1942.
