= Serpentine fibula–polycystic kidney syndrome =

- Other names: Acroosteolysis with osteoporosis and changes in skull and mandible
- Specialty: Nephrology

Exner syndrome, also known as serpentine fibula polycystic kidney syndrome, is a rare disorder, typified by the afflicted person having oddly formed, s-shaped fibulas as well as the development of numerous cysts in the kidneys.

== Symptoms and signs ==
All of the following are usual elements of the syndrome:

- Short stature
- Abnormal calf bone shape (fibula)
- Unusual facial appearance
- Polycystic kidneys
- Abnormally long fibula
- Mild sunken chest
- Large corneas
- Inguinal hernia
- Umbilical hernia

== Diagnosis ==
Exner syndrome is sometimes misdiagnosed as interstitial cystitis in its very early stages, but once the fibula begins to malform, Exner is the only real diagnosis.

== History ==
The syndrome was discovered in June, 1988 by Dr. G. Exner, a researcher at Orthopädische Universitätsklinik Balgrist in Zurich, Switzerland. Exner officially named the disorder serpentine fibula polycystic kidney syndrome, but the term "Exner syndrome" became more prevalent. While some research links it to other, related disorders, most research suggests that Exner syndrome is very distinct.
