= Felix Maria von Exner-Ewarten =

Austrian meteorologist and geophysicist

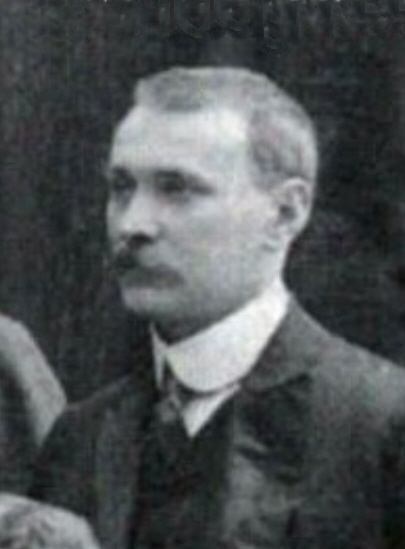
- Felix Maria von Exner-Ewarten
- Born: 23 August 1876; Vienna, Austria-Hungary
- Died: 7 February 1930 (aged 53); Vienna, Austria
- Known for: Exner equation Exner function
- Scientific career
- Fields: Meteorology

Felix Maria von Exner-Ewarten (23 August 1876 in Vienna – 7 February 1930, Vienna) was an Austrian meteorologist and geophysicist.

He belonged to the reputed Exner family of academics and scientists, which included his grandfather Franz S. Exner and his father Sigmund Exner. His son Christof Exner (1915–2007) was a professor of geology in Vienna.
