= Hertha Wambacher =

Austrian physicist (1903–1950)

- Born: March 9, 1903; Vienna, Austria-Hungary
- Died: March 25, 1950 (aged 47); Vienna, Austria
- Known for: Research on cosmic rays
- Awards: Lieben Prize 1937
- Scientific career
- Fields: Physics
- Doctoral advisor: Marietta Blau

Hertha Wambacher (9 March 1903 – 25 April 1950) was an Austrian physicist.

== Education ==
After having obtained the general certificate of education from the girls' high school run by the Association for the Extended Education of Women in 1922, she studied first chemistry, then physics at the University of Vienna. She was an early member of the Nazi Party.

== Work with Marietta Blau ==
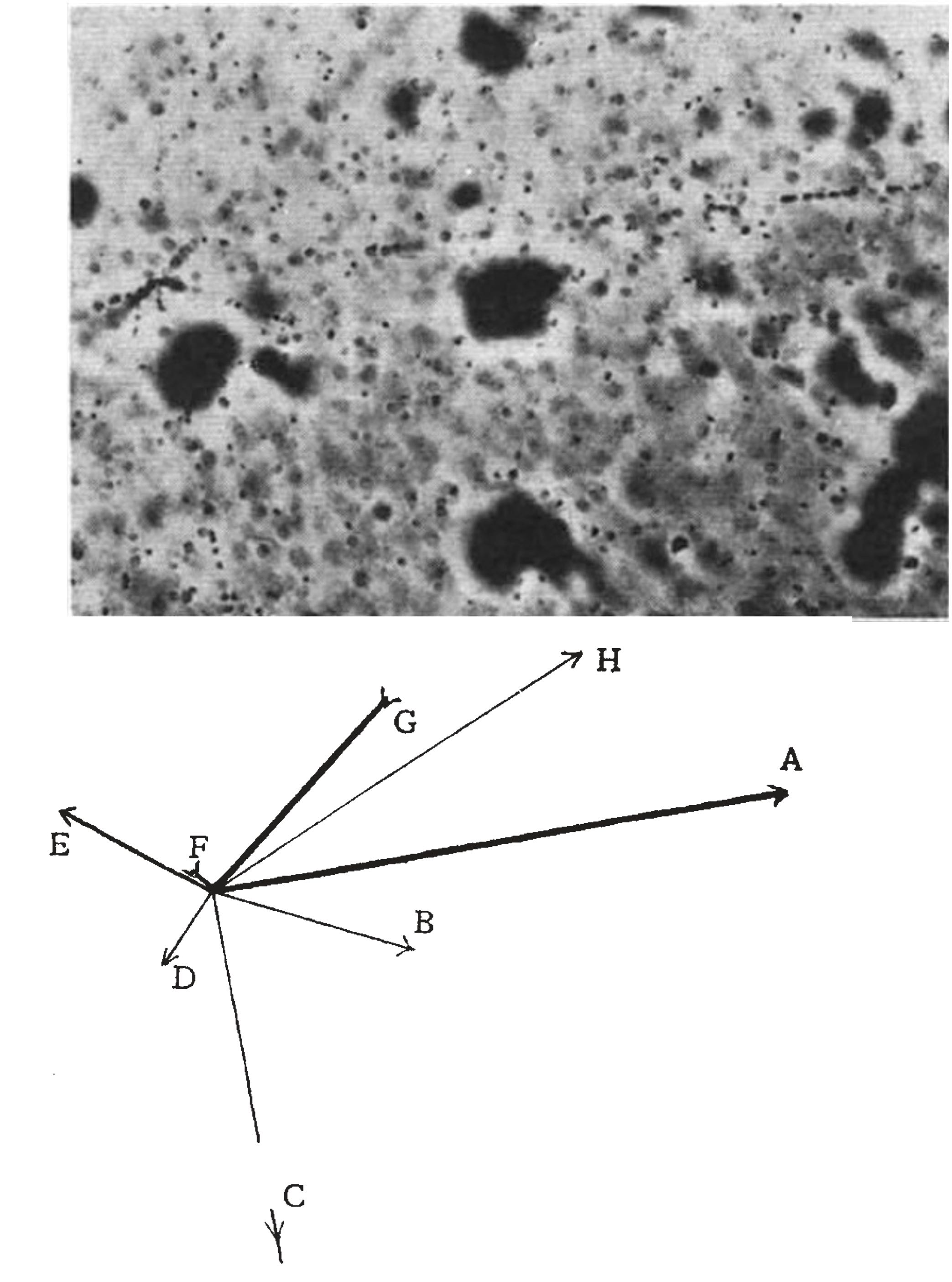

Wambacher's dissertation at the 2nd Physics Institute was supervised by Marietta Blau, with whom Wambacher continued to collaborate also after her Ph.D. graduation in 1932. The cooperation of the two women referred to the photographic method of detecting ionizing particles. For their methodical studies at the Institute for Radium Research of the Austrian Academy of Sciences in Vienna, Blau and Wambacher received the Lieben Prize of the Austrian Academy of Sciences in 1937. Also in 1937, Blau and Wambacher jointly discovered "disintegration stars" in photographic plates that had been exposed to cosmic radiation at an altitude of, 2300 m above sea level. These stars are the patterns of particle tracks from nuclear reactions (spallation events) of cosmic-ray particles with nuclei of the photographic emulsion.

== Academic career and further research ==
After Blau had to leave Austria in 1938 due to antisemitism, Hertha Wambacher continued working on the identification of particles from nuclear reactions of cosmic rays with the emulsion constituents. With this work, she obtained her university teaching certification in 1940. She taught classes at the University of Vienna.

== Nazism, post-war life ==
In 1945, Wambacher who – according to her own words – had belonged to the NSDAP since 1934, was removed from the University of Vienna. She was detained in Russia and is said to have returned only in 1946. She contracted cancer, but was still able to work in a research laboratory in Vienna.

== Death ==
Wambacher died from cancer on 25 April 1950.

== See also ==
- Timeline of women in science

== Literature ==
- Robert Rosner & Brigitte Strohmaier (eds.): Marietta Blau – Sterne der Zertrümmerung. Biographie einer Wegbereiterin der modernen Teilchenphysik. Böhlau, Vienna 2003, ISBN 3-205-77088-9 (in German)
- Brigitte Strohmaier & Robert Rosner: Marietta Blau – Stars of Disintegration. Biography of a pioneer of particle physics. Ariadne, Riverside, California 2006, ISBN 978-1-57241-147-0
