= Stefan Meyer (physicist) =

Austrian physicist (1872–1949)

- Born: 27 April 1872; Vienna, Austria-Hungary
- Died: 29 December 1949 (aged 77); Bad Ischl, Austria
- Education: University of Vienna
- Awards: Lieben Prize (1913)
- Scientific career
- Fields: Radioactivity
- Workplaces: Institute for Radium Research
- Doctoral advisor: Franz Serafin Exner

Stefan Meyer (27 April 1872 – 29 December 1949) was an Austrian physicist involved in research on radioactivity. He became director of the Institute for Radium Research in Vienna and received the Lieben Prize in 1913 for his research on radium. He was the brother of Hans Leopold Meyer who was also awarded the Lieben Prize.

== Early life and education ==
Stefan was the second son of Jewish parents: a lawyer and notary Gotthelf Karl Meyer and his wife Clara (née Goldschmidt, sister of Victor Mordechai Goldschmidt). He went to school in Vienna and later graduated from gymnasium in Horn in 1892. He studied physics at the University of Vienna and attended the University of Leipzig for one year. He obtained his PhD in 1896 for work with Franz Serafin Exner and completed his habilitation in 1900.

== Career ==
In 1897, Meyer became assistant of Ludwig Boltzmann at the Institute for Theoretical Physics, University of Vienna. His research was dedicated to magnetic permeability of liquids. After a talk of Friedrich Oskar Giesel – a pioneer in the research and production of radium – he obtained a sample of radium from Giesel to determine magnetic properties of the new element. Meyer and his colleague Egon von Schweidler were able to show that the Becquerel rays (beta rays) could be deflected by magnetic fields; this effect was discovered simultaneously by several scientists, but Meyer et al. also showed that the radiation from polonium (alpha rays) behaved differently in the magnetic field.

Meyer was able to organise the production of 4 grams of radium, as recommended in 1901 by the Austrian Academy of Sciences. The chemical plant of Auer von Welsbach, which was used to produce rare earth elements, provided the necessary technical equipment and knowledge for separation of small quantities of material from ore. Meyer became interim head of the institute for one year after the suicide of Ludwig Boltzmann. During that time, Meyer had also contacted Lise Meitner before she left for Berlin in 1907. Meyer became assistant of Exner in 1908 and professor in 1909. The ample supply of radium which he shared with Pierre and Marie Curie in Paris, Rutherford in Manchester and Ramsay in London made him a key figure in the research on radium.

The only larger source for radium-containing pitchblende was the Sankt Joachimsthal mines, which were located in Austria-Hungary. To improve the industrial use and mining of radium, Austrian industrialist Karl Kupelwieser donated 500,000 Austrian kronen to found an institute for research on radium in 1908. In 1910, the Institute for Radium Research in Vienna was opened. Meyer became its first acting director under Exner who was the official director of the institute. The institute in Vienna opened two years before the Institute du Radium in Paris.

During the time when Meyer was acting director, a number of prominent scientists worked at the institute, including George de Hevesy, Victor Francis Hess and Friedrich Paneth. With the Anschluss Österreichs in 1938, the annexation of Austria by Nazi Germany, Meyer as a Jew had to leave office. He requested retirement before he was forced out of the institute. He stayed in his house in the countryside of Austria and, because of the intervention of several people, was left unharmed for the rest of the war. His older brother Hans Leopold Meyer, a professor of chemistry, was less protected and died in the Theresienstadt concentration camp in 1942. After the war, Meyer was rehabilitated and allowed to return to his Institute as director. Meyer died in Bad Ischl in 1949 and is buried in the Bad Ischl Friedhof.

== Publications ==
Stefan Meyer published several articles on radioactivity together with Schweidler. He compiled most of the findings on radioactivity in a book. This book became a standard German textbook on radioactivity similar to the book of Curie in French and the book of Rutherford in English. During his forced retirement, he wrote a book on musical instruments and acoustics.
