= Franz S. Exner =

Austrian physicist (1849–1926)

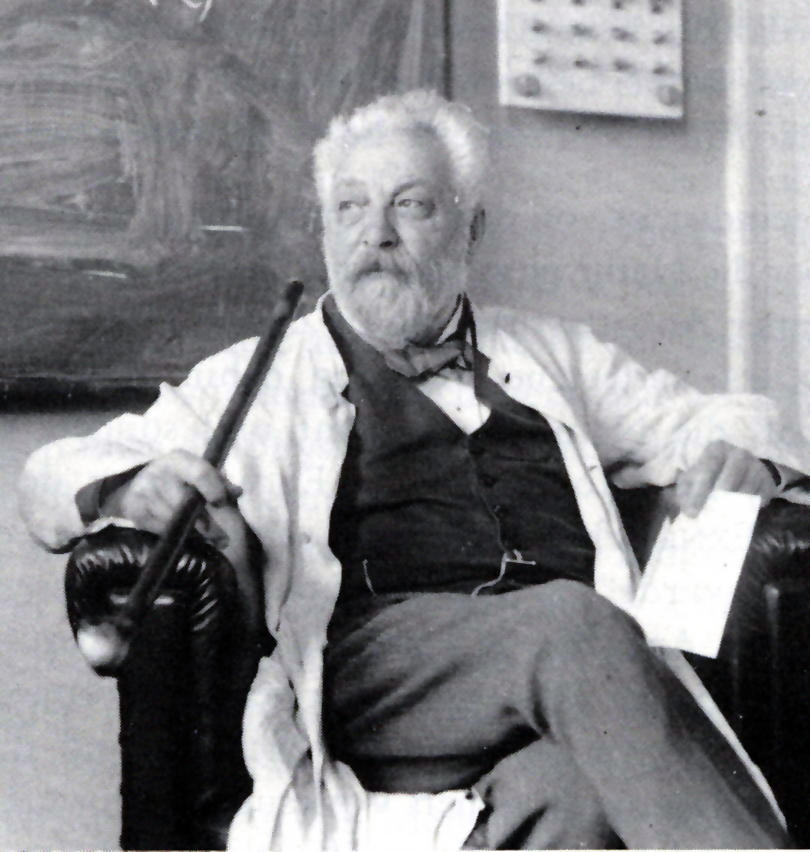
- Exner in 1915
- Born: Franz Serafin Exner jun. 24 March 1849; Vienna, Austrian Empire
- Died: 15 November 1926 (aged 77); Vienna, First Austrian Republic
- Education: University of Vienna
- Known for: Transmitting Herbartianism into Austrian academic life
- Spouse(s): Auguste Bach; Friederike Schuh
- Father: Franz Serafin Exner sen.
- Scientific career
- Fields: Physics
- Workplaces: University of Vienna
- Doctoral advisor: Viktor von Lang
- Other academic advisors: August Kundt
- Doctoral students: Felix Ehrenhaft; Friedrich Hasenöhrl; Karl Lark-Horovitz; Lise Meitner; Stefan Meyer; Marian Smoluchowski
- Other notable students: Erwin Schrödinger

Franz Serafin Exner jun. (Austrian German: [ˈfrants ˈɛksnɐ]; 24 March 1849 – 15 November 1926) was an Austrian physicist and professor at the University of Vienna. He is known for pioneering physical chemistry education in Austria. The early introduction to university curricula of subjects such as radioactivity, spectroscopy, electrochemistry, electricity in the atmosphere, and color theory in Austria are often credited to him.

He advised many notable students including Stefan Meyer, Erwin Schrödinger, and Marian Smoluchowski.

Exner was associated with Herbartianism and helped transmit Johann Friedrich Herbart's philosophy into Austrian academic life.

== Life ==
=== Early life and family ===
Franz Serafin Exner came from an important university family in the Austrian Empire. His family included Adolf Exner, Karl Exner, Sigmund Exner, Marie von Frisch and Felix Maria von Exner-Ewarten (grandson, son of Sigmund Exner). Exner was the youngest of the five children who survived to adulthood of parents Franz Serafin Exner sen. (1802–1853) and Charlotte Dusensy (1816–1859). His father, Franz Serafin Exner, was, from 1831 to 1848, a professor of philosophy in Prague and from 1848 onwards a member of the Board of Education in Vienna, becoming an influential reformer of Austrian university education.

=== Academic studies ===
Franz Exner began his university physics studies in Vienna in 1867. He received a doctorate from the University of Vienna in 1871, after an academic year at Zürich under August Kundt, also working alongside Wilhelm Conrad Röntgen, Kundt's student and, especially through the 1870s, regular research assistant/partner.

The greatest influence on Exner's student career was probably the theoretical physicist Viktor von Lang, who had taken the University Chair in Physics at a still relatively young age in 1866, and who played a key role in encouraging and backing his gifted student. Exner received his habilitation in 1874 with a work entitled "On the Diffusion through Liquid Lamellas" (German: Über die Diffusion durch Flüssigkeitslamellen). He continued to work for von Lang as the latter's research assistant till 1879. Between 1874 and 1879, he also held a lectureship at the University of Natural Resources and Life Sciences, Vienna "k.k. Hochschule für Bodencultur" (Imperial College for Earth Sciences), which provided both a welcome supplementary income and the chance to share his ideas and insights with the large audiences attracted by his lectures.

=== Professorship ===
In 1879, still only 30, Franz Exner accepted an Extraordinary Professorship at the University of Vienna. In 1885, he was elected to corresponding membership of the Austrian Academy of Sciences and Humanities. Full membership would follow in 1896. Promotion came in 1891 when he was offered and accepted an "ordinary" (full) professorship at the university chemical physics Institute in the Türkenstraße. He arrived in the post with a clear agenda for change, which he now implemented. He created a new "school for experimental physics" to which, through a rare combination of sound judgment and good fortune, he was able to entice a stellar generation of younger researchers. New laboratory courses were inaugurated for advanced students, notably in respect of physics and medicine.

Exner's appointment to the professorship followed the retirement of Josef Loschmidt. Loschmidt had been a junior colleague and good friend to Exner's father. Himself also a scientist-mathematician, he had looked after the interests of the younger Franz Exner and his four elder siblings following the early deaths of their father and mother in 1853 and 1859.

The university chemical physics Institute in the Türkenstraße remained the focus of Exner's professional career through the most productive years of his career. The premises were nevertheless something of an embarrassment, being desperately cramped and short on equipment. The situation improved a little in 1905 when the department was renamed the "Zweites Physikalisches Instutut" ("Second [University] Physics Institute"), correctly implying a complementary status to "Erstes Physikalisches Institut" ("First [University] Physics Institute") which, under the directorship of Ludwig Boltzmann, sustained its own reputation for brilliance in other branches of the rapidly expanding subjects-palette of interest to physicists.

Exner also took his turn in university administration. He served as philosophy dean of the faculty during 1903-1904, and served as a member of the university senate during 1907-1908. By the time he served, during 1908-1909, as rector of the University of Vienna, he was at the pinnacle of his scientific achievements.

=== World War I ===
In 1913, additional space was made available within new institute buildings. However, since the outbreak of World War I in 1914 was accompanied by funding cuts, while the young men were sent away to participate on the Italian front. By the time the war ended, in 1918, the Austro-Hungarian Empire was destroyed, and intensifying austerity had left university funding a long way down the list of public priorities. Some of Exner's most brilliant former students found their way to the United States. He himself was already over 70 in 1918.

=== Retirement and death ===
Franz Exner retired from his university responsibilities in 1920 and died in Vienna in 1926. His body was buried at the large Sieveringer Friedhof cemetery on the western (then) outskirts of Vienna. Slightly more than ten years later, in 1937, a bronze tablet to his memory was produced by Michael Powolny and, with due ceremony, placed in the university's Arkadenhof in 1937.

== Endorsing Röntgen ==
Franz Exner was a gregarious man, regularly holding informal dinners for university colleagues at his home. At the start of 1896, at one of these gatherings, he showed some of them a copy of "Ueber eine neue Art von Strahlen" ("On a new kind of [radioactive] ray"), a brief learned article which he had received from the author, his friend since their time together in Zürich, Wilhelm Röntgen. Röntgen, unlike his friend, was an exceptionally shy and self-contained scholar, but on New Year's Day 1896 he had, uncharacteristically, made a trip to the post office at Würzburg (the city where he lived and worked) with no fewer than 90 envelopes. Each was addressed to a different European physicist. In twelve of the envelopes - including the one addressed to Exner - there were some X-ray copies. Exner's copy arrived on 6 January 1896: it was one of those accompanied by several copies of the first X-rays. One of the colleagues to whom Exner showed his friend's work was Ernst Lecher, established already as a talented experimental physicist, and a scholar-scientist for whose future career Röntgen's discoveries would prove pivotal. Lecher was also the son of Zacharias Konrad Lecher (1829–1905), the publisher and at this time editor-in-chief of the Neue Freie Presse, one of Vienna's leading mass-circulation newspapers. After the little meeting, Exner left the book and the X-ray copies with Lechner, and news of Röntgen's invention very quickly found its way into the public consciousness across and beyond Europe through the Vienna press.

== Research ==
The extent of his contribution as an organiser and mentor, helping to ensure that physics research was based on a sound footing from which the discoveries of the 20th century might flow, has frequently led Exner's own research work to be downplayed or overlooked by commentators.

His earliest published work concerned determination of the temperature at which water will reach its maximum density. His focus between 1877 and 1894 was on the rapidly evolving field of electrochemistry and the chemical implications of galvanic processes in different materials. Subsequently, he broadened his research interests to incorporate aspects of meteorology, spectroscopy and radioactivity, with a particular interest in measurement techniques involving atmospheric electricity. Inspired by the prospect of being able to determine more precisely the chemical compositions of some of the very many of meteorites that had accumulated in the university collection, during the later 1890s he turned to work on spectral analytic investigation, working with his student Eduard Haschek to develop a method for rapid measurement of wavelengths by using enlarged photo-plates and spectral projections onto a white screen. During his final decades, his personal research work was primarily concerned with the implications of the Young–Helmholtz theory, attempting to ground the theory more firmly in experimental evidence, and defending it against detractors.

== Notable students ==
Exner was viewed by admirers, including his students, as a versatile and exceptionally broadly educated physicist with a strong vision, cultivating versatile and highly educated pupils. He was a pioneer in numerous areas of modern physics, greatly broadening the accepted scope of the subject through his endeavours. His most famous pupils included Marian Smoluchowski, a Viennese physicist of Polish descent, who discovered a theory for Brownian motion, independently of Albert Einstein and Friedrich Hasenöhrl.

Erwin Schrödinger, who later also won the 1933 Nobel Prize in Physics, also began his career as Exner's pupil, later becoming his research assistant in 1911. In 1914, Schrödinger received his Habilitation (higher postgraduate degree) with his "Studies on the kinetics of dielectrics, melting point, pyro- and piezoelectricity". Exner supervised the habilitation. (Note: "Studien über Kinetik der Dielektrika, den Schmelzpunkt, Pyro- und Piezoelektrizität")

Another of Exner's doctoral students was Stefan Meyer, who became the first director of the Institute for Radium Research ("Institut für Radiumforschung"), itself the first university institute in the world dedicated to researching radioactivity, and opened in 1910 in Vienna by Exner himself.

Lise Meitner, credited with several important discoveries including, in 1917, that of the radioactive isotope protactinium-231, was another of Exner's doctoral students.

During the 1920s and 1930s, a remarkable preponderance of university chairs in Physics in the German-speaking world were occupied by Exner's former students:

- Josef Thuma, Brno, later full professor in Prague;
- Anton Lampa, Prague;
- Hans Benndorf, Graz;
- Marian Smoluchowski, Czernowitz, Krakau;
- Stefan Meyer, Vienna;
- Egon Schweidler, Innsbruck, Vienna;
- Eduard Haschek, extra full professor Vienna;
- Friedrich Hasenöhrl, Vienna;
- Arthur Szarvassi;
- Heinrich Mache, Vienna;
- Victor Conrad, Brünn, later USA;
- Felix Maria von Exner-Ewarten, Vienna;
- Friedrich von Lerch, Innsbruck;
- Karl Przibram, Vienna;
- Felix Ehrenhaft, Vienna;
- Erwin Lohr, Brünn;
- Wilhelm Schmidt, Vienna;
- Franz Aigner, Vienna;
- Victor Francis Hess, Graz, Innsbruck, New York;
- Karl Wilhelm Friedrich Kohlrausch,
- Ludwig Flamm, Vienna;
- Erwin Schrödinger, Jena, Leipzig, Zürich, Berlin, Graz, Dublin, Vienna;
- and Hans Thirring, Vienna.

== Selected publications ==
- Franz Exner und Sigmund Exner: Die physikalischen Grundlagen der Blütenfärbungen, 1910
- W C Röntgen und F Exner: Über die Anwendung des Eiskalorimeters zur Bestimmung der Intensität der Sonnenstrahlen. Wien Ber 69: 228 (1874)
- Franz Exner: Vom Chaos zur Gegenwart, 1926 (unpublished)
