= Institute for Radium Research, Vienna =

Austrian research institute

The Institute for Radium Research is an Austrian research institute associated with the Austrian Academy of Sciences, Vienna. The Institute's researchers won multiple Nobel Prizes. Due to the gradual change of interests, "nuclear physics" was added to the institute's name in 1956. Since 2004, it is called the Stefan-Meyer-Institute for subatomic physics.

== History ==
The Sankt Joachimsthal mines were located within the Austria-Hungary monarchy, and were the largest producers of uranium containing ore at the end of the 19th century. Eduard Suess sent the first samples of pitchblende to Pierre and Marie Curie for their research on radioactive materials. This action was taken after the advice of Franz Serafin Exner. After the discovery of radium, the Austrian industrial Karl Kupelwieser donated 500,000 Austrian kronen to found an institute for research on radium in 1908. After constructing the building for the institute in 1909–1910, the institute was opened on 28 October 1910. Stefan Meyer became the first acting director, and Franz Serafin Exner was the director of the institute until Meyer took over in 1920. Meyer stayed in that position until the Anschluss Österreichs in 1938, the annexation of Austria by Nazi Germany, forced him to retire due to his Jewish ancestors. After the war, he was reinstated as director and performed his duties until his retirement in 1947. The starting years were dominated by the research on the new element radium. Meyer was able to organize the production of 4 gram radium, as recommended in 1901 by the Austrian Academy of Sciences. The chemical plant of Carl Auer von Welsbach, which was used to produce rare-earth elements, provided the necessary technical equipment and knowledge required for separation of small quantities of material from ore. This relative large amount made it possible for Otto Hönigschmid to determine the molecular mass of radium using 1.5 g of radium bromide.

Victor Franz Hess was working on the absorption of gamma rays in the atmosphere. His discovery of cosmic rays in 1912, which was rewarded by the Nobel Prize in 1936, was a direct result of his work in the institute.

George de Hevesy and Friedrich Adolf Paneth developed at the Institute the radioactive tracers method, for which Hevesy received the Nobel Prize in 1943. Initially, very few women scientists worked at the Institute, including Berta Karlik and Marietta Blau; however, the percentage of women reached 30% during the time of Meyer. From 1945 to 1974, Berta Karlik directed the Institute. In 1955, Karlik became professor for nuclear physics at the University of Vienna, so that the Institute was now both an Academy and a University Institute. Herbert Vonach succeeded her as director from 1974 to 1986.

The institute was renamed in 1956, so that "nuclear physics" was now included in the title - corresponding to the widened research interests. In 1987, the institute was converted into an "Institute for Intermediate Energy Physics" under the direction of W. H. Breunlich.

== Honour ==
On 28 May 2015, the Institute received the title "Historic Site" by the European Physical Society.

== Successor organisations ==
There are now two separate successor organisations:

- The Stefan Meyer Institute for subatomic Physics of the Austrian Academy of Sciences (SMI, earlier: Institute for Intermediate Energy Physics) that investigates the Strong Interaction in cooperation with foreign research centers.
- The Institute for Isotope Research and Nuclear Physics of the University of Vienna which uses the particle accelerator VERA for Radiocarbon Dating and similar dating methods.
