= Victor Hess =

Austrian–American physicist (1883–1964)

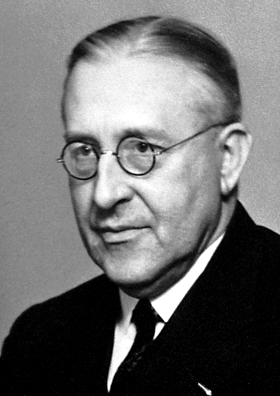
- Hess in 1936
- Born: Victor Franz Hess; 24 June 1883; Deutschfeistritz, Austria-Hungary
- Died: 17 December 1964 (aged 81); Mount Vernon, New York, U.S.
- Citizenship: Austria; United States (nat. 1944)
- Education: University of Graz; University of Vienna (PhD)
- Known for: Discovery of cosmic rays
- Spouses: Marie Breisky (m. 1920; died 1955) Elizabeth Hoenke (m. 1955)
- Awards: Ignaz Lieben Prize (1919); Nobel Prize in Physics (1936)
- Scientific career
- Fields: Physics
- Workplaces: Institute for Radium Research; University of Graz; United States Radium Corporation; United States Bureau of Mines; University of Innsbruck; Fordham University
- Academic advisors: Franz S. Exner; Leopold Pfaundler

Victor Franz Hess (Note: His middle name is sometimes anglicized as Francis.) (German: [ˈvɪktɔʁ ˈfʁants ˈhɛs]; 24 June 1883 – 17 December 1964) was an Austrian–American experimental physicist who shared the 1936 Nobel Prize in Physics with Carl David Anderson for his discovery of cosmic rays.

== Education ==
Victor Franz Hess was born on 24 June 1883 at Waldstein Castle in Deutschfeistritz, Duchy of Styria, Austria-Hungary, the son of Serafine Edle (née von Grossbauer-Waldstättthe) and Vinzens Hess. His father was a royal forester in Prince Louis of Oettingen-Wallerstein's service.

Hess attended Graz-Gymnasium from 1893 to 1901. He then studied at the universities of Graz and Vienna, receiving a Doctor of Philosophy from the latter in 1906.

== Career ==
In 1910, Hess became an assistant to Stefan Meyer at the Institute for Radium Research in Vienna. In 1920, he was appointed Extraordinary Professor of Experimental Physics at the University of Graz. In 1921, he took a leave of absence to become Director of the Research Laboratory at the United States Radium Corporation in New Jersey, as well as Consulting Physicist for the United States Bureau of Mines in Washington, D.C. In 1923, he returned to Graz, where he was appointed Ordinary Professor of Experimental Physics in 1925. In 1931, he was appointed Director of the Institute of Radiology at the University of Innsbruck.

In 1937, Hess returned to the University of Graz to become Director of the Institute of Physics. The following year, Austria was annexed by Germany, and Hess was dismissed from his post. He then moved to the United States and was appointed Professor of Physics at Fordham University in New York City, where he remained until his retirement in 1958. He became a naturalized U.S. citizen in 1944.

== Discovery of cosmic rays ==
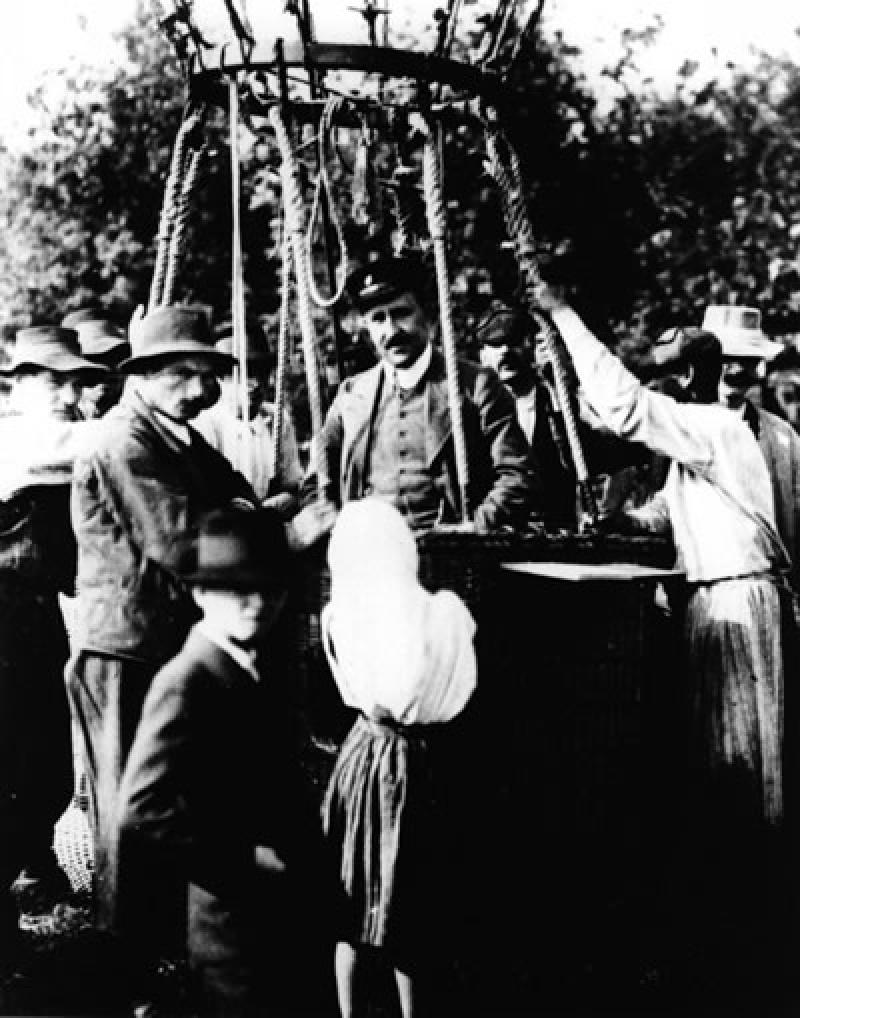
Hess (center) on the return from his balloon flight, 1912

For many years, scientists had been puzzled by the levels of ionizing radiation measured in the atmosphere. The assumption at the time was that the radiation would decrease as the distance from the Earth, the then assumed source of the radiation, increased. The electroscopes previously used gave an approximate measurement of the radiation but indicated that at greater altitude in the atmosphere the level of radiation might actually be higher than that on the ground. He approached this mystery first by greatly increasing the precision of the measuring equipment, and then by personally taking the equipment aloft in a balloon. He systematically measured the radiation at altitudes up to 5.3 kilometres (3.3 mi) during 1911–1912. The daring flights were made both by day and during the night, at significant risk to himself.

The result of Hess' meticulous work was published in the Proceedings of the Austrian Academy of Sciences, and showed the level of radiation decreased up to an altitude of about 1 kilometre (0.6 mi), but above that the level increased considerably, with the radiation detected at 5 kilometres (3.1 mi), being about twice that at sea level. His conclusion was that there was radiation penetrating the atmosphere from outer space, and his discovery was confirmed by Robert Millikan, who gave the radiation the name cosmic rays. His discovery opened the door to many new discoveries in particle and nuclear physics. In particular, both the positron and the muon were first discovered in cosmic rays by Carl David Anderson. In 1936, Hess and Anderson shared the Nobel Prize in Physics for their discoveries of cosmic rays and the positron, respectively.

== Personal life and death ==
In 1920, Hess married Marie Bertha Warner Breisky, who died of cancer in 1955. The same year, he married Elizabeth M. Hoenke, who nursed Marie at the end of her life.

Hess was a practising Roman Catholic. In 1946, he wrote on the topic of the relationship between science and religion in his article "My Faith", in which he explained why he believed in God.

Hess died of Parkinson's disease on 17 December 1964 in Mount Vernon, New York, at the age of 81.

== Recognition ==
=== Awards ===
Year	Organization	Award	Citation	Ref.
1919	Austrian Academy of Sciences	Ignaz Lieben Prize	—	
1936	Royal Swedish Academy of Sciences	Nobel Prize in Physics	"For his discovery of cosmic radiation."	

=== Honouurs ===
Year	Country	Honor	Ref.
1959	Austria	Austrian Decoration for Science and Art	

== Books ==
- Hess, Victor F. (1928). The Electrical Conductivity of the Atmosphere and its Causes.

== See also ==
- Hess (crater)
- Astroparticle physics
