= Donetsk Culture and Leisure Park =

Park in Donetsk, Ukraine

Coordinates: 48°01′25″N 37°48′55″E

- Interactive map of Donetsk Culture and Leisure Park
- Location: Kyivskyi District, Donetsk
- Established: 1956

The Donetsk Culture and Leisure Park (Ukrainian: Парк культури і відпочинку міста Донецька, romanized: Park kultury i vidpochynku mista Donetska, lit. 'Donetsk City Park of Culture and Leisure'), known by the Russian authorities controlling the area as the Leninist Komsomol Park of Culture and Leisure (Russian: Парк культуры и отдыха имени Ленинского комсомола; Ukrainian: Парк культури і відпочинку імені Ленінського комсомолу) is a recreational area in the city of Donetsk.

== History ==
It was planned back in 1952, when Central Scherbakov Park of Culture and Leisure could no more fully address the city needs because Shakhtar stadium was built on its territory. The park was laid out only in 1956 due to numerous modifications of design; the same year the 20th anniversary of Maxim Gorky's death was commemorated, so the park was first named after him. In 1958 the 40th Anniversary of Leninist Komsomol alley was established, and the park was subsequently renamed to Leninist Komsomol Park (officially renaming in 1972). The park was renamed to its current name on the 11th of September 2006 during its refurbishment.

== Former names ==
- Maxim Gorkin Park (1956 — 1972)
- Leninist Komsomol Park of Culture and Leisure (Note: Ukrainian: Парк культури і відпочинку імені Ленінського комсомолу, romanized: Park kultury i vidpochynku imeni Leninskoho komsomolu; Russian: Парк культуры и отдыха имени Ленинского комсомола, romanized: Park kultury i otdykha imeni Leninskogo komsomola) (25 October 1972 — 10 September 2006)

After the self-proclaimed Donetsk People's Republic took control of the city, the Soviet-era name was restored, but the Ukrainian authorities do not recognize it.

== Places of interest ==
- The Viktor Priklonsky Little Donetsk Railway. Opened in 1972.
- Youth and Sports Palace "Yunost" (Eng. – "Youth"), opened at the entry to the park
- To Donbas Liberators, opened on 8 May 1984, the city and region's main war history monument.
- Monument to the Peacekeeping Soldiers (veterans of Soviet–Afghan War). The monument was opened on 7 May 1996
- Fairy Tale Meadow, an amusement place for children in the forest, where sculptures of fairy-tale characters are built
- Donbass Arena

== Gallery ==
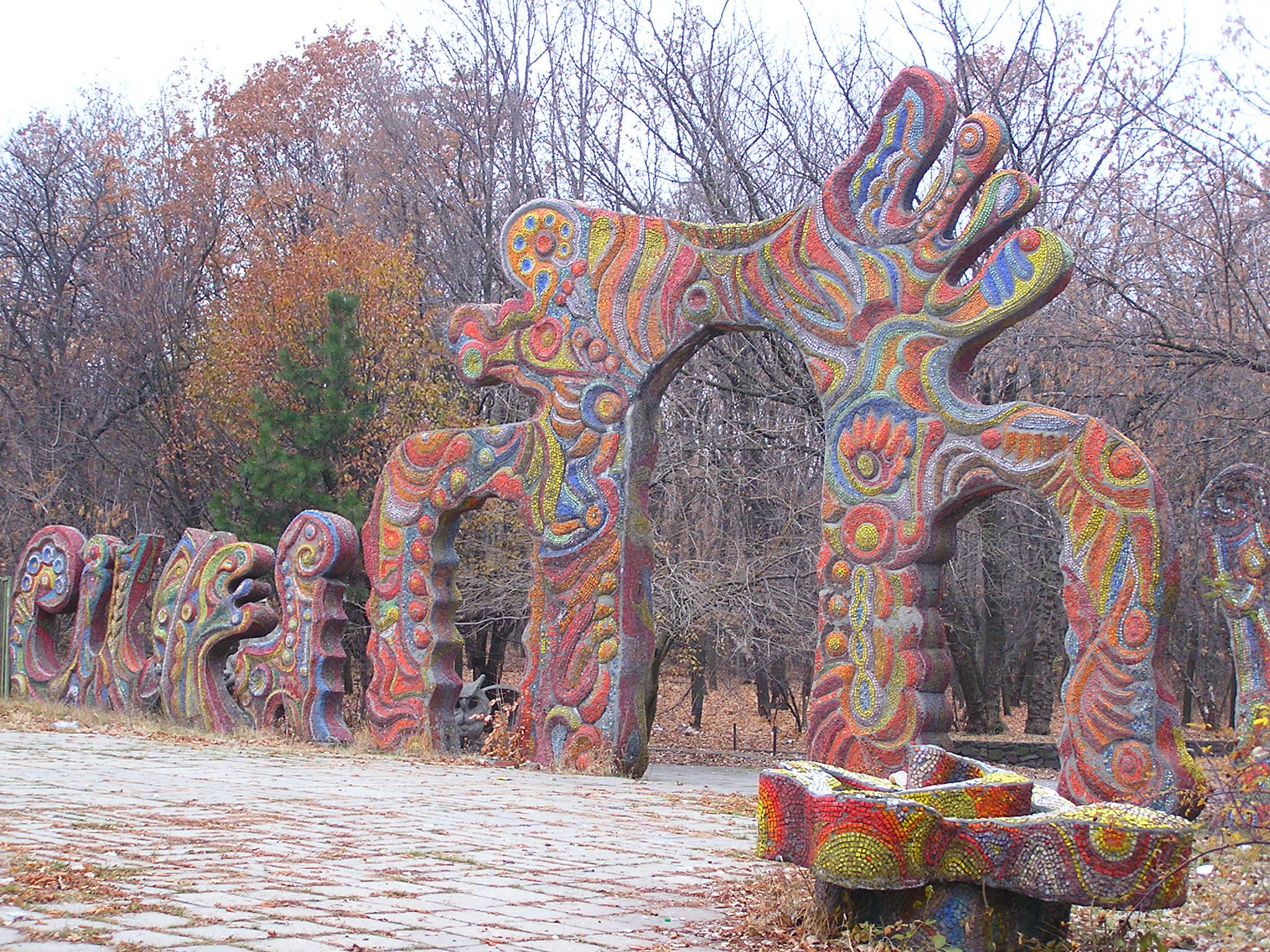
Entrance to the Fairy Tale meadow

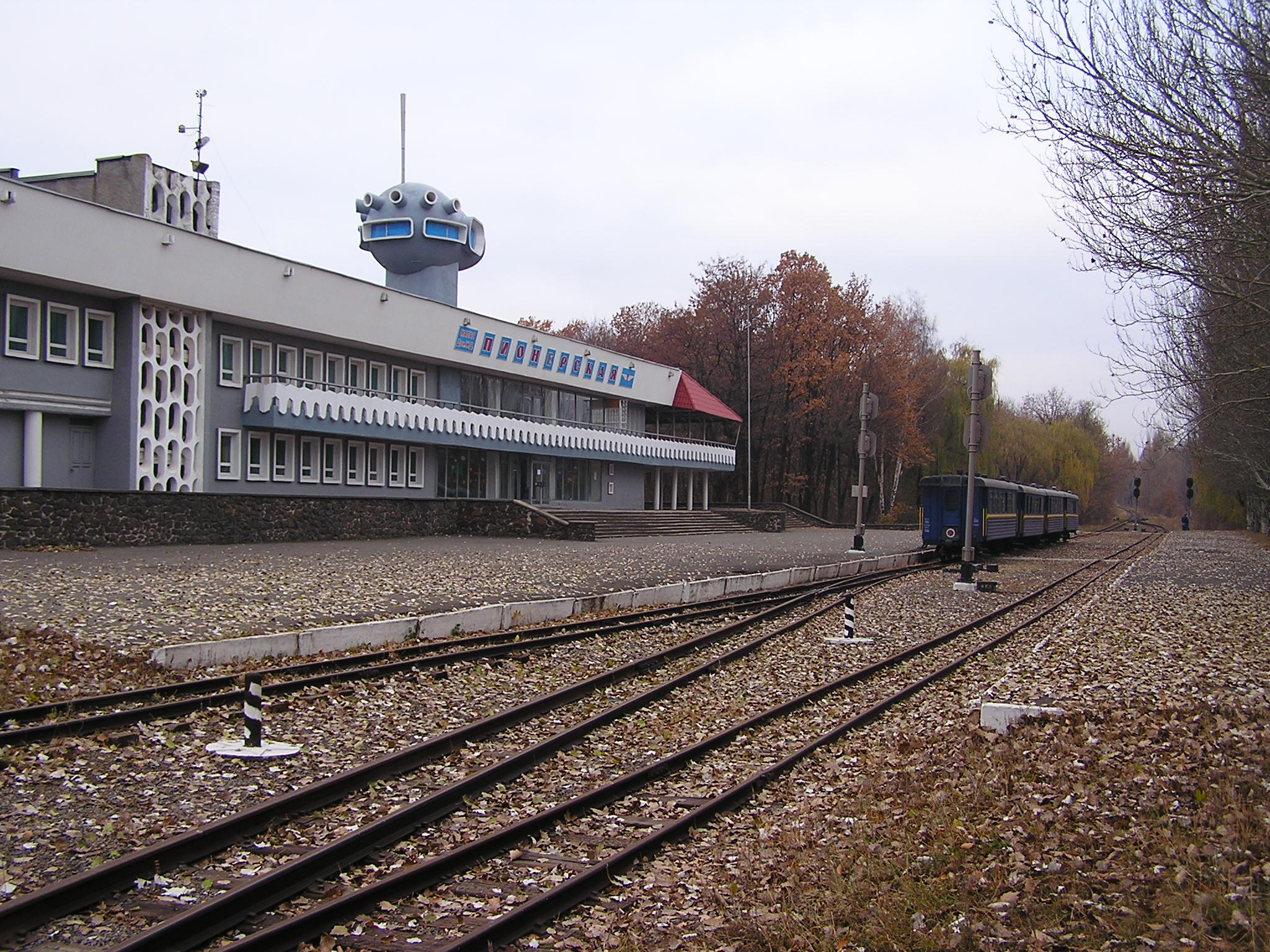
Children Railway station

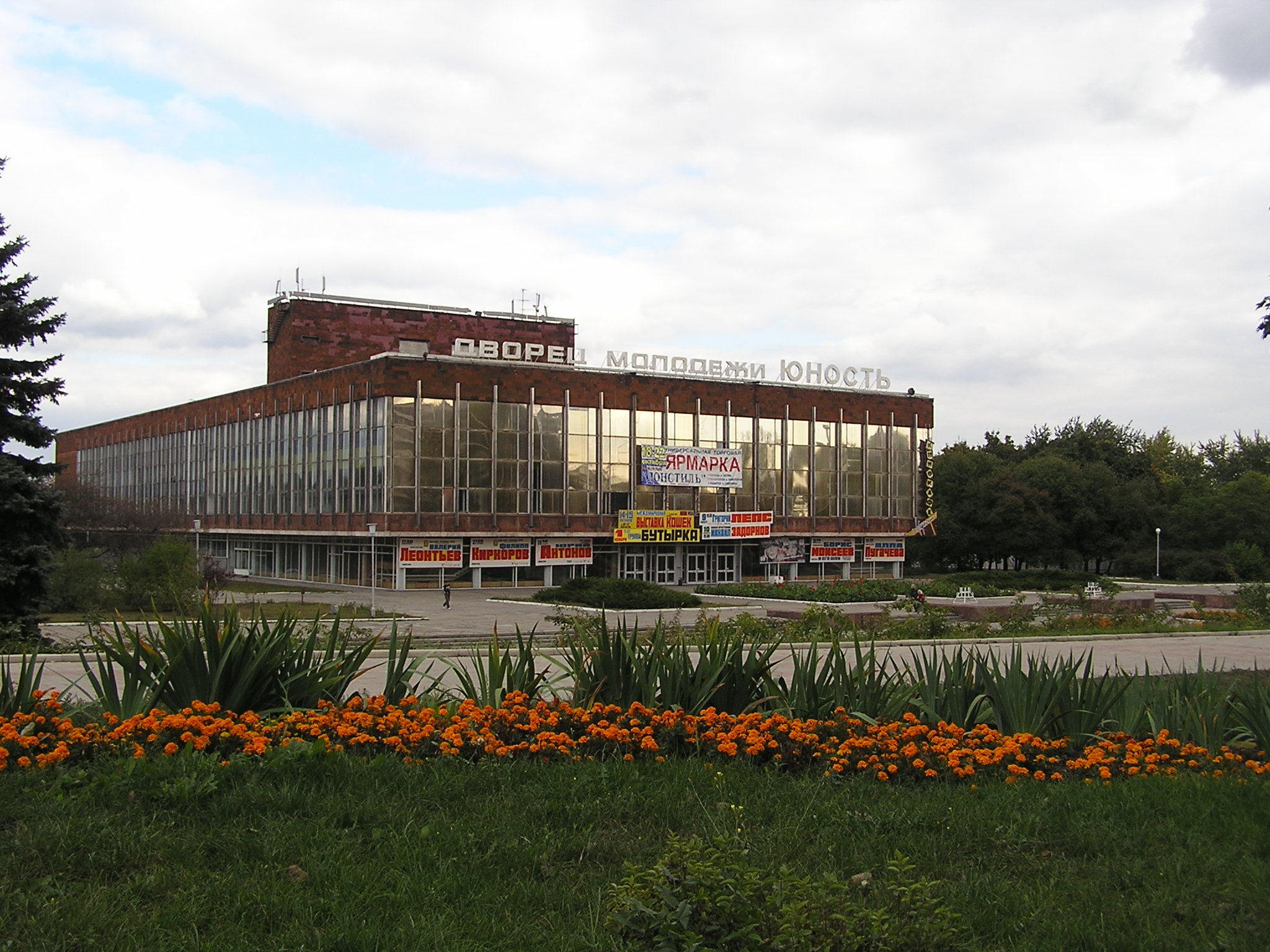
Youth and Sports Palace "Yunost'"

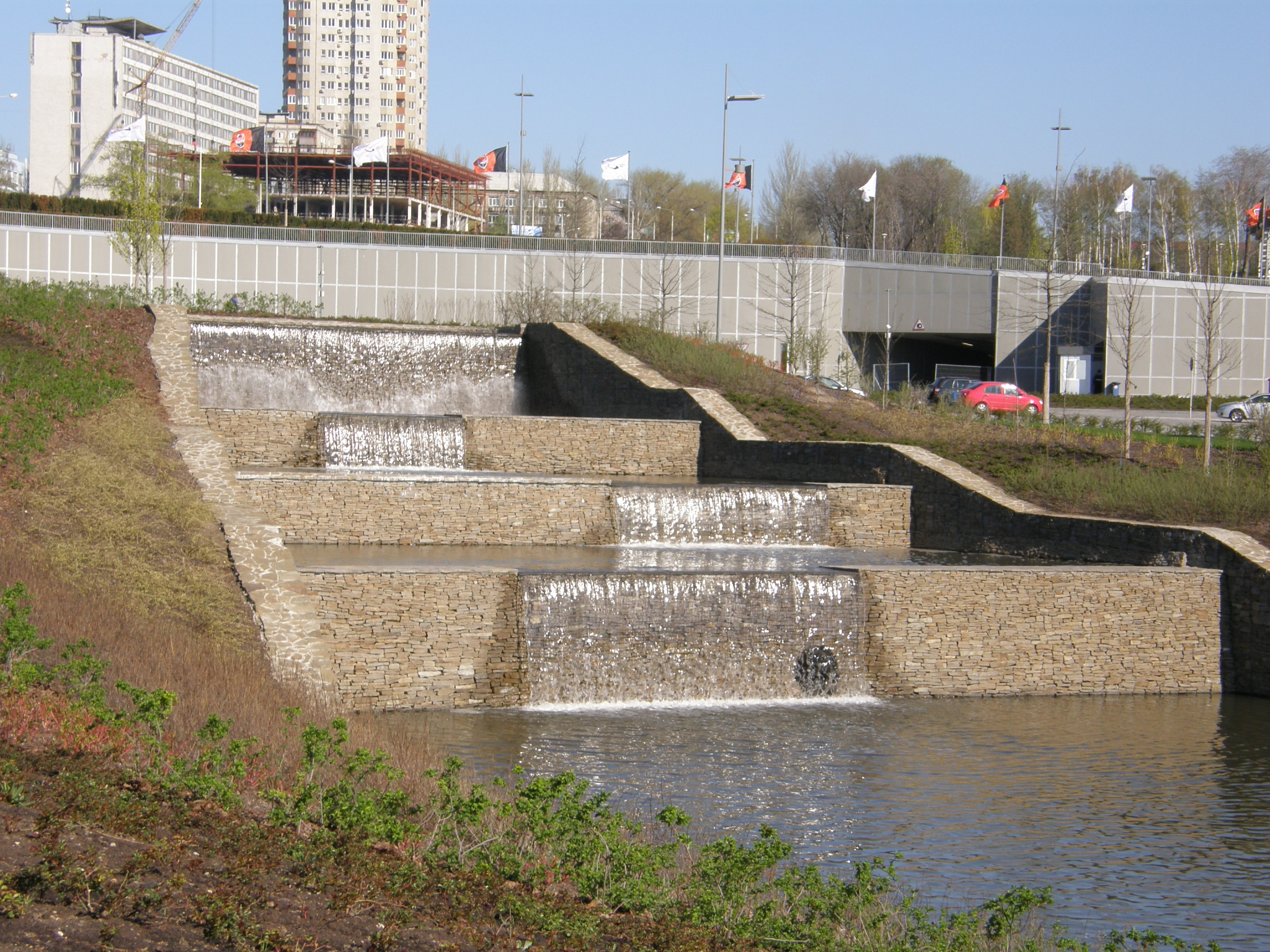
Fountains in the new part of the park

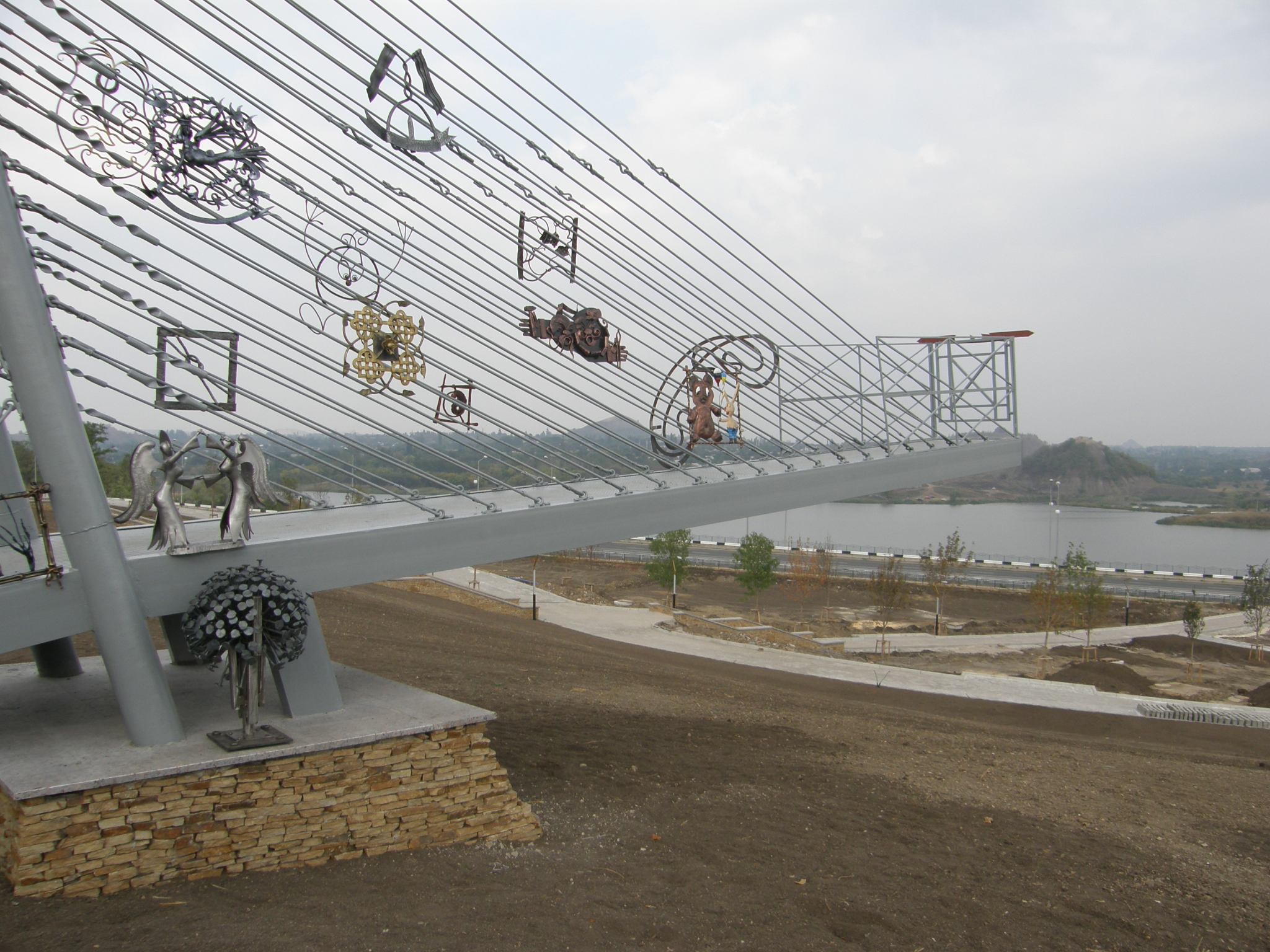
Friendship Bridge
