= To Donbas Liberators =

Monument in Donetsk, Ukraine

Coordinates: 48°01′17″N 37°48′56″E

To Donbas Liberators (Ukrainian: Твоїм визволителям, Донбасе, romanized: Tvoim vyzvolyteliam, Donbase, lit. 'To your liberators, Donbas') is a monument in Donetsk Culture and Leasure Park, Donetsk, dedicated to military units and formations participating in the ousting of Wehrmacht from Donbas during World War II. It is the largest monument in the south-east of Ukraine, the main military history monument of the city and region.

Memorial events dedicated to Victory Day are traditionally held near the monument. Veterans march through downtown to the monument, where they are congratulated and banquet tables are arranged for them in the alleys near the monument.

In addition to the monument, the memorial complex includes military equipment platform, Veterans minipark, honor roll dedicated to underground partisan movement, the memory bell.

== Description ==
Monument is done in the shape of a triangle, which is a group of three inclined walls coming out of the ground and symbolizing the silhouettes of Donetsk terricones by their sharp edges. At the foot of the monument there is an eternal flame. One of the walls has dedication: "1943. To Your Liberators, Donbas". At another wall there is a sculpture plate, listing the dates Donetsk Oblast settlements were recaptured.

On the platform there is a sculptural composition, a Miner and a Soldier, who hold with their right hands the sword with its edge down. The Soldier's left hand is raised up, the Miner's left hand is taken aside. Behind the figures the flag in the form of a five-pointed star is waving. The Soldier is a young man with sharp face, and the Miner is a mature man. Portraits were sculptured without models and are the collective images. The sculptures are made of copper, the height is 18 meters, the total height of the monument together with the pedestal and the banner is more than 30 meters. The pedestal is lined outside with black granite rising from the ground angle-wise that symbolizes the coal layers. The pedestal is hollow inside.

== Location ==
The monument is located in the Kyivskyi district of Donetsk, in the Lenin Komsomol Park. Due to its location on the hill above Kalmius river, the monument is visible from afar. The monument is located at the end of the broad avenue that divides the park into two parts. In the middle of the avenue flowerbeds are arranged, and it is surrounded by different kinds of trees: acacia, tilia, chestnut tree, spruce and other floral forms of Donetsk region. At the adjacent territory the following was established: the "Veterans Garden" (est. in 2010), "Alley of Soldiers' Widows" (birches were planted out in 2010), "Memory Alley" (est. on September 6, 1992 to honor the people of Donetsk who died and were missing in World War II).

== Creation ==
Central Committee of USSR Communist Party and USSR Council of Ministers issued the Decree about establishing the monument in 1967. Kiev team of sculptors started working on the monument creation, but never went further than the idea development. In 1976, the group of Donetsk authors began working on the monument, among them sculptors Yuri Baldin and Alexander Porozhnyuk, and architects Vladimir Kishkan and Mikhail Ksenevich, the design engineer Yefim Raygorodetsky. Vladimir Kishkan led the group, and had a lot of ideas on the monument design. The monument was supposed to open on the 40th anniversary of the recapture of Donets Basin, which was in September 1983, but due to the lack of time it was postponed and the monument was unveiled on May 8, 1984 on 39th anniversary of the Victory Day.

In 2010, to honor of the 65th anniversary of Victory in World War II a large-scale reconstruction of the monument, memory plates, the central alley was done, 300 workers were involved in the reconstruction process. Reconstruction allowed creating a consolidated memorial complex, also the monument to veterans of Soviet–Afghan War was moved to Donbas Liberators monument, and they formed a single composition then.

== Museum ==
Initially the museum was planned within the monument, but this idea was abandoned because of difficult geological conditions. Under the figures there was a space with total area of 3 500 square meters and a height of 18 meters. This room was used to store old scenery of Donetsk National Academic Ukrainian Musical and Drama Theatre. There was also an idea to create a multi-tiered panorama of World War II. In the late 2000s (decade), Alexander Porozhnyuk returned to the idea of creating a museum inside the monument, and in 2010, the works on preparing the ground facilities to the creation of Great Patriotic War Museum began, that are supposed to be finished in two or three years.

== Military equipment site ==
In 2010, to honor the 65th anniversary of Victory in World War II three tanks were installed in front of the monument: T-34-76, T-34-85, T-54/55, two anti-tank guns ZIS-2, and ZiS-3. Tanks and anti-tank guns participated in the recapture of the then Stalino.

Monument To Donbas Liberators

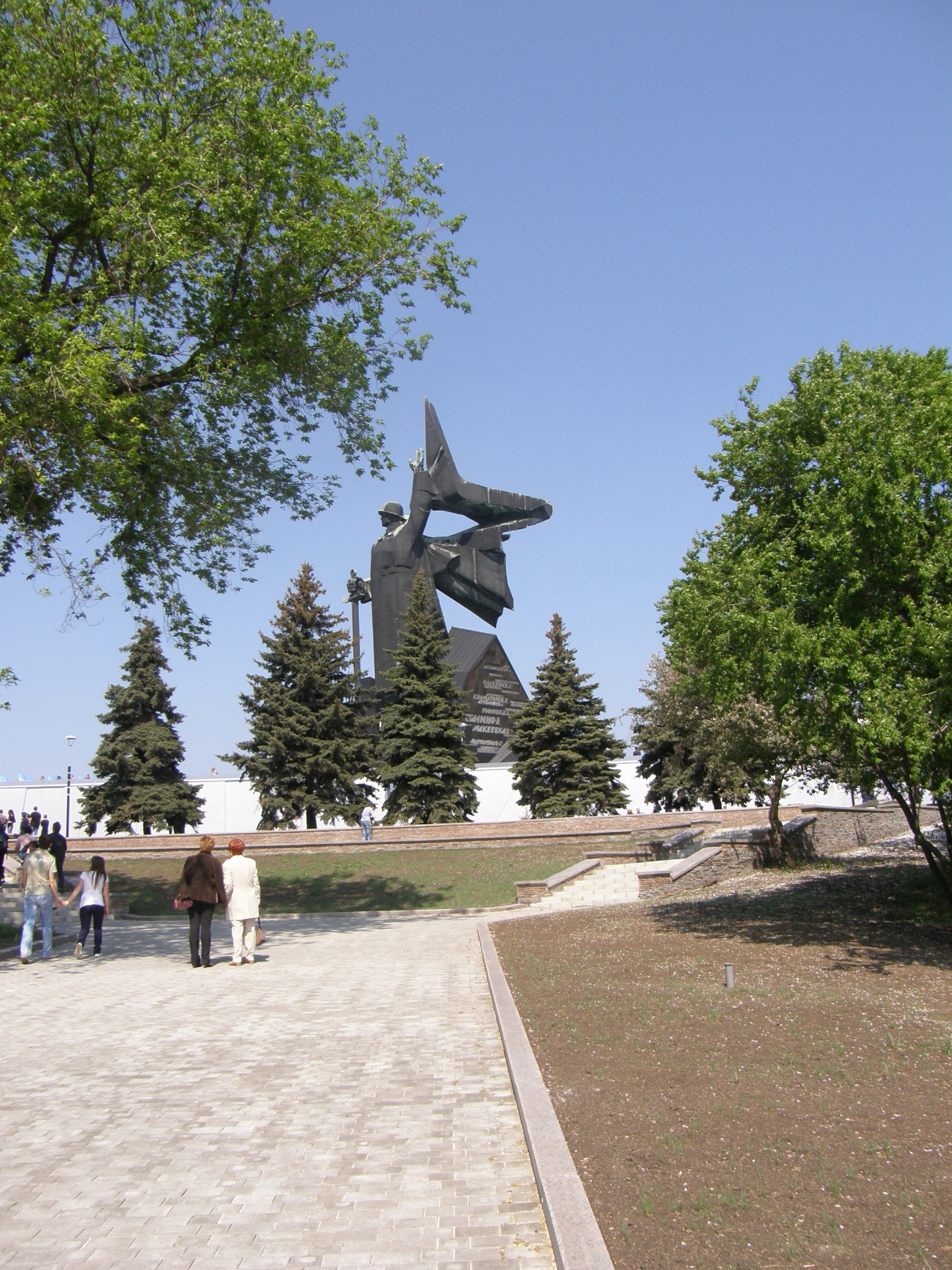
View from the south-east side

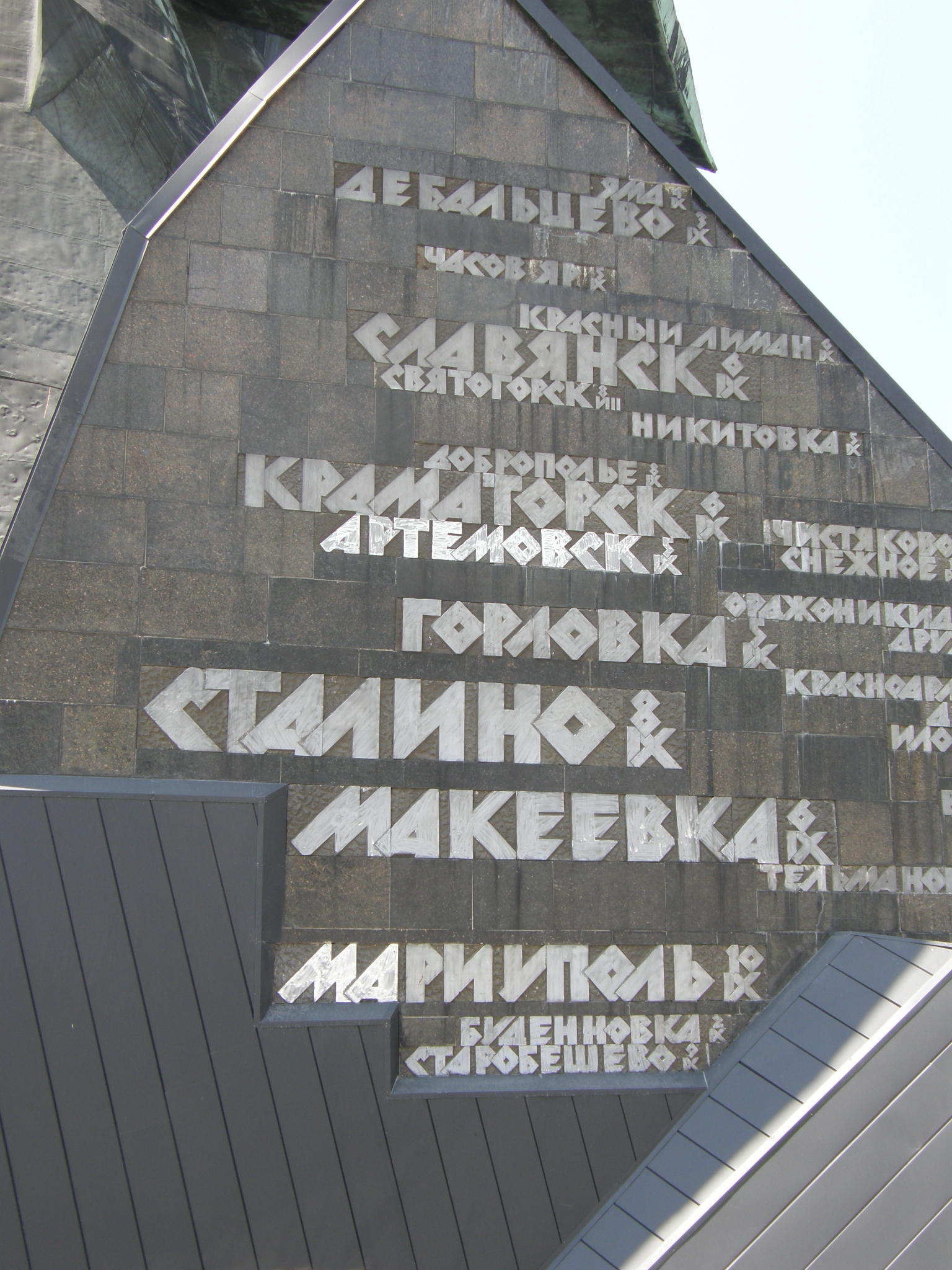
Wall with plates listing the dates of liberation of Donetsk Oblast cities

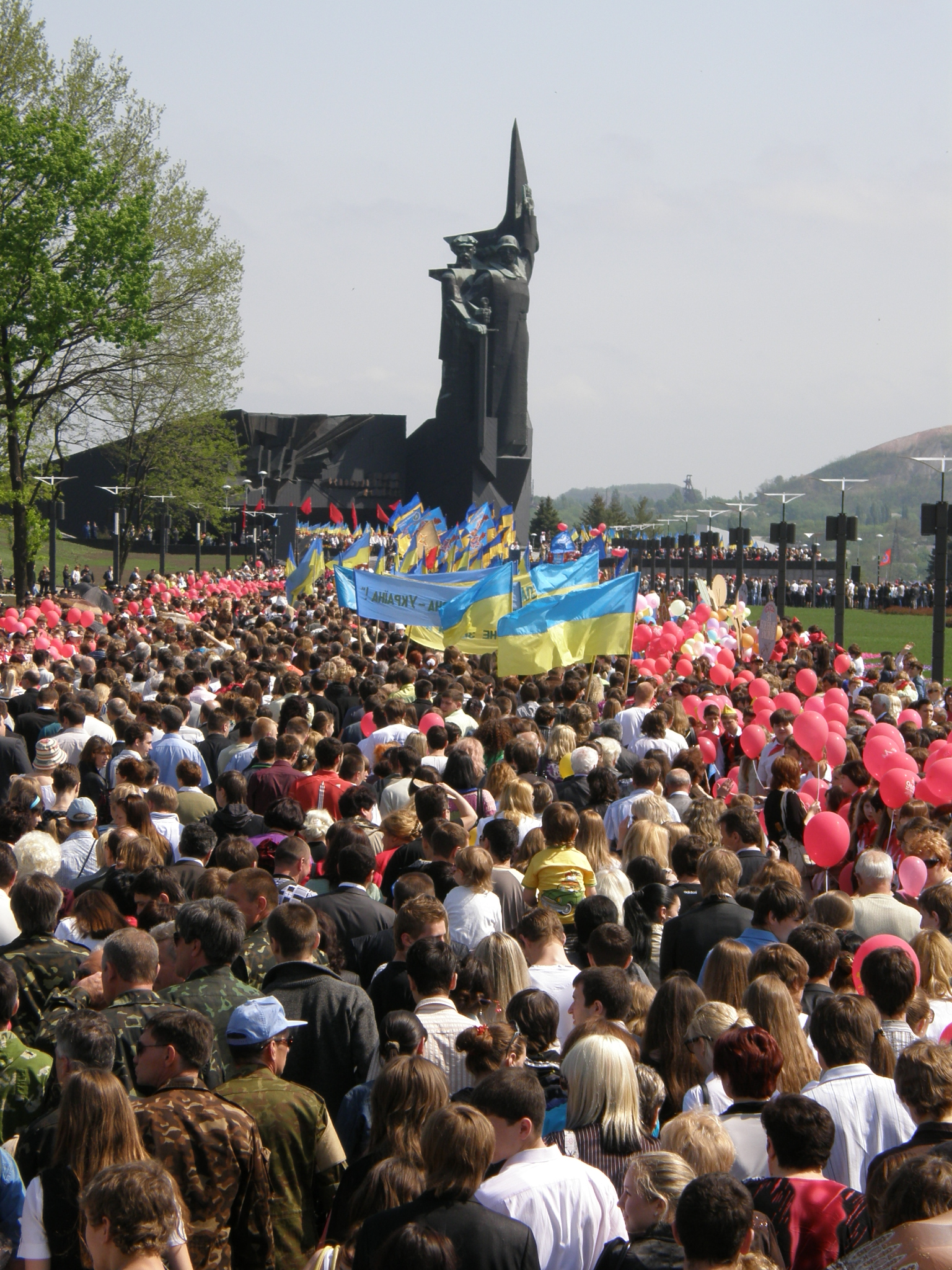
Victory Day, 2010

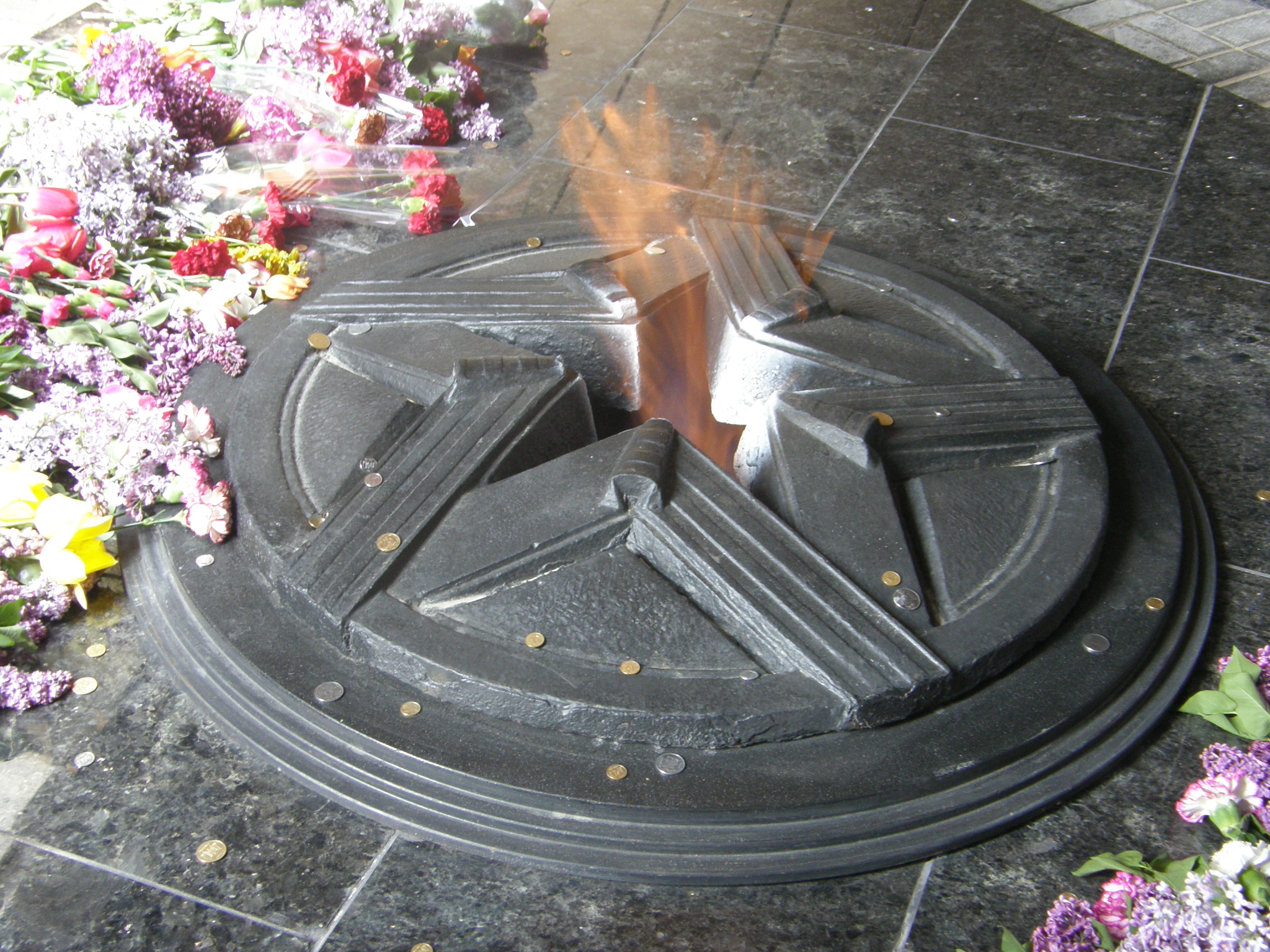
Eternal flame

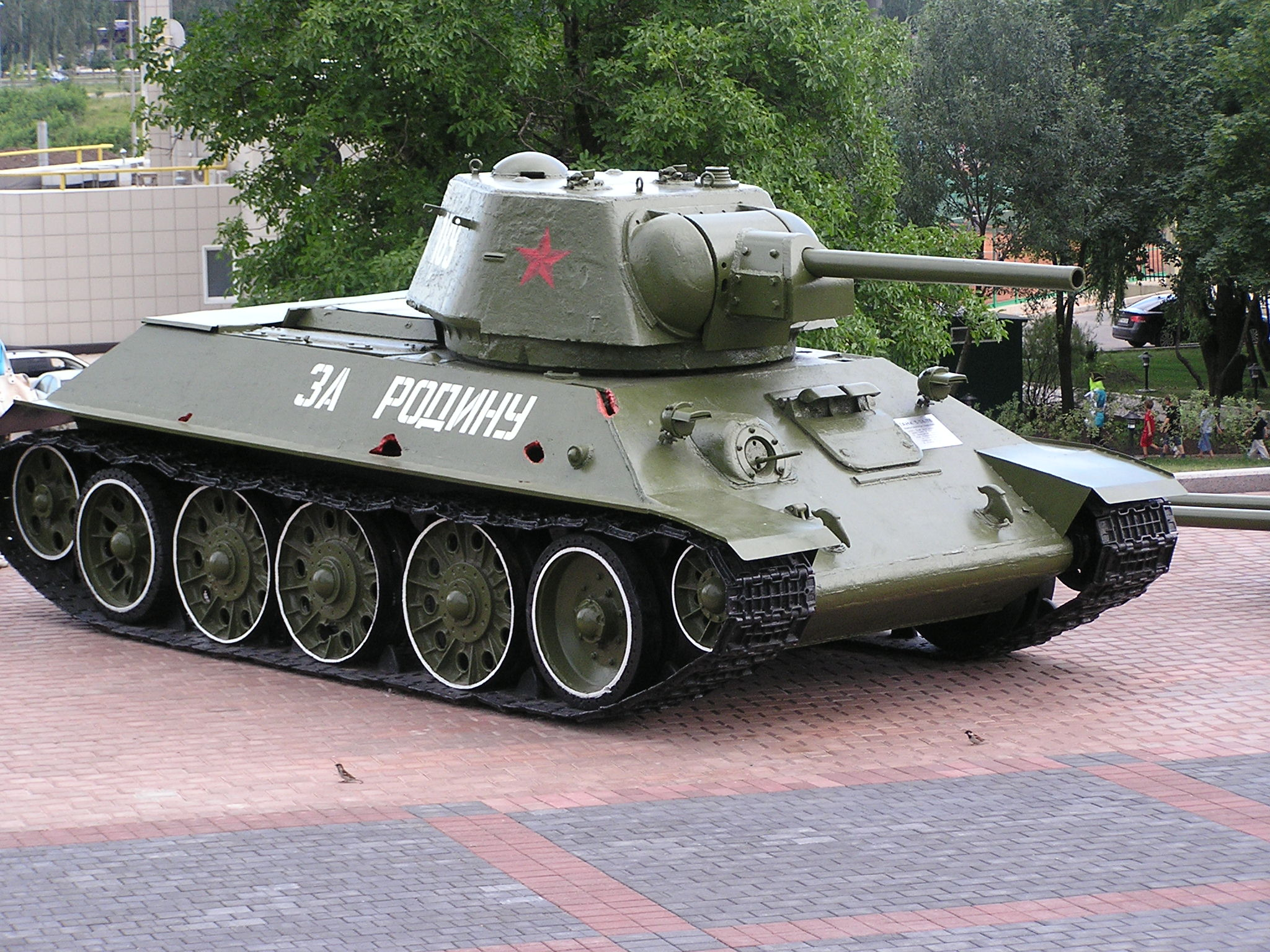
Т-34-76

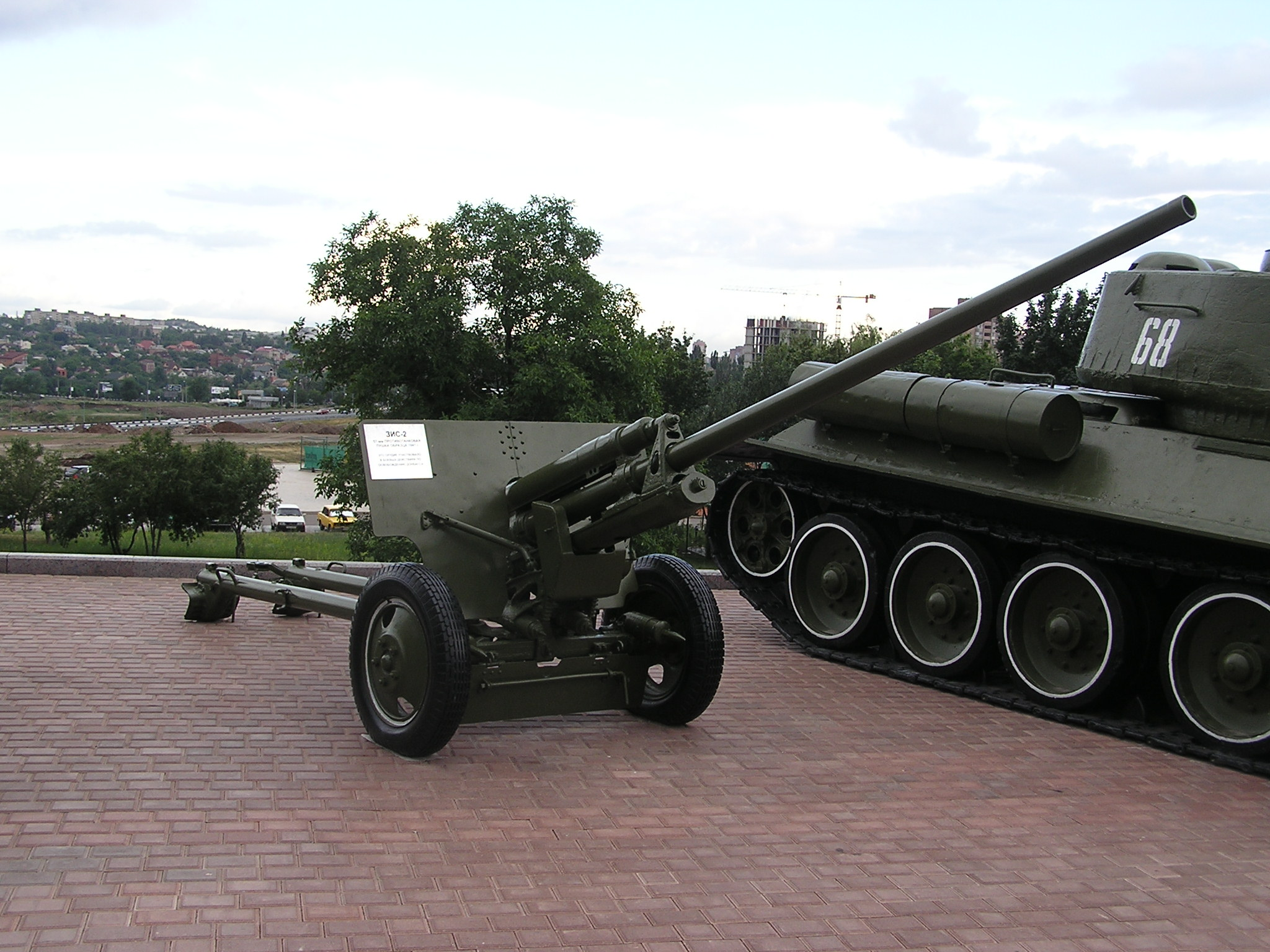
ZiS-2

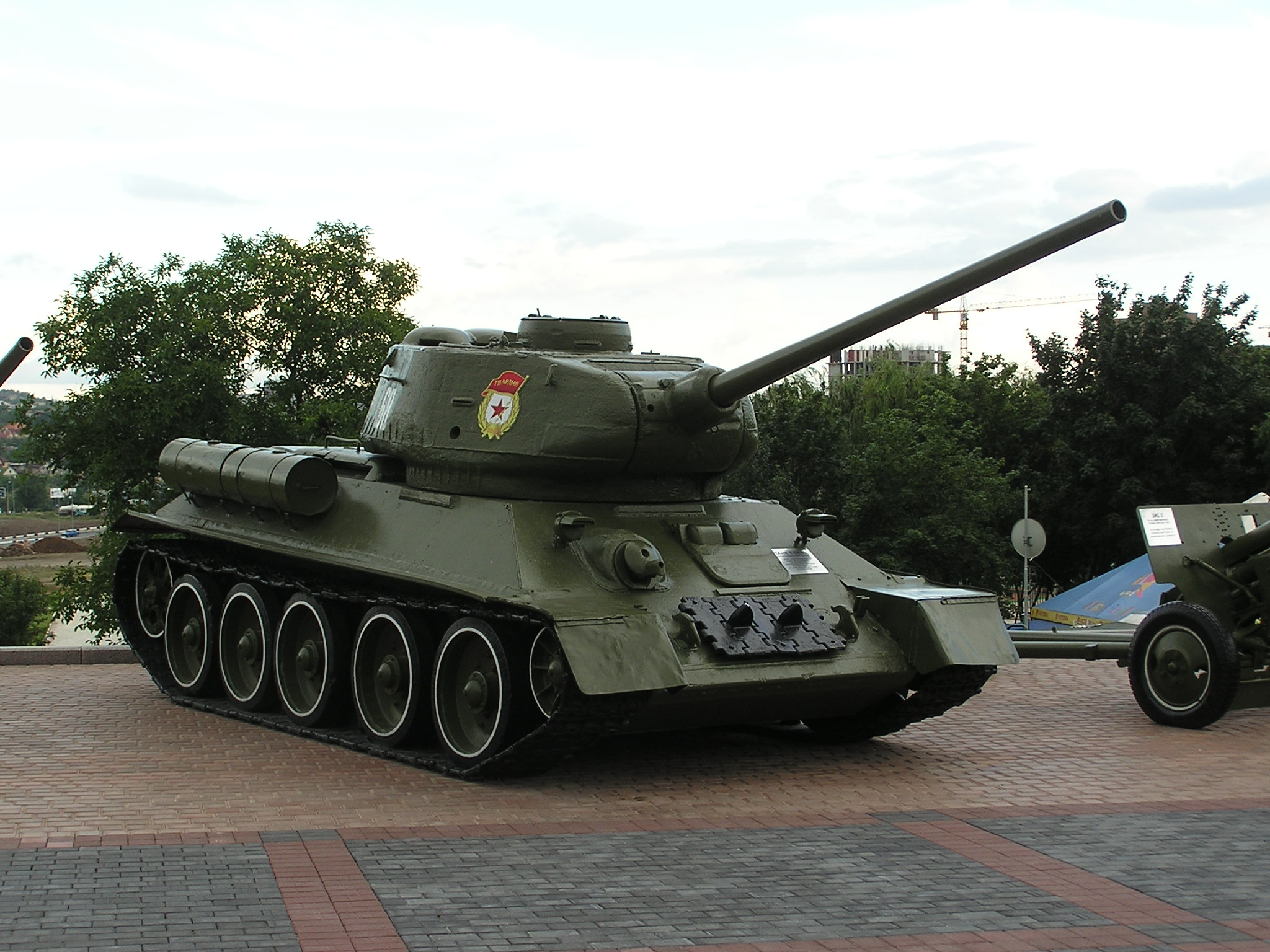
Т-34-85

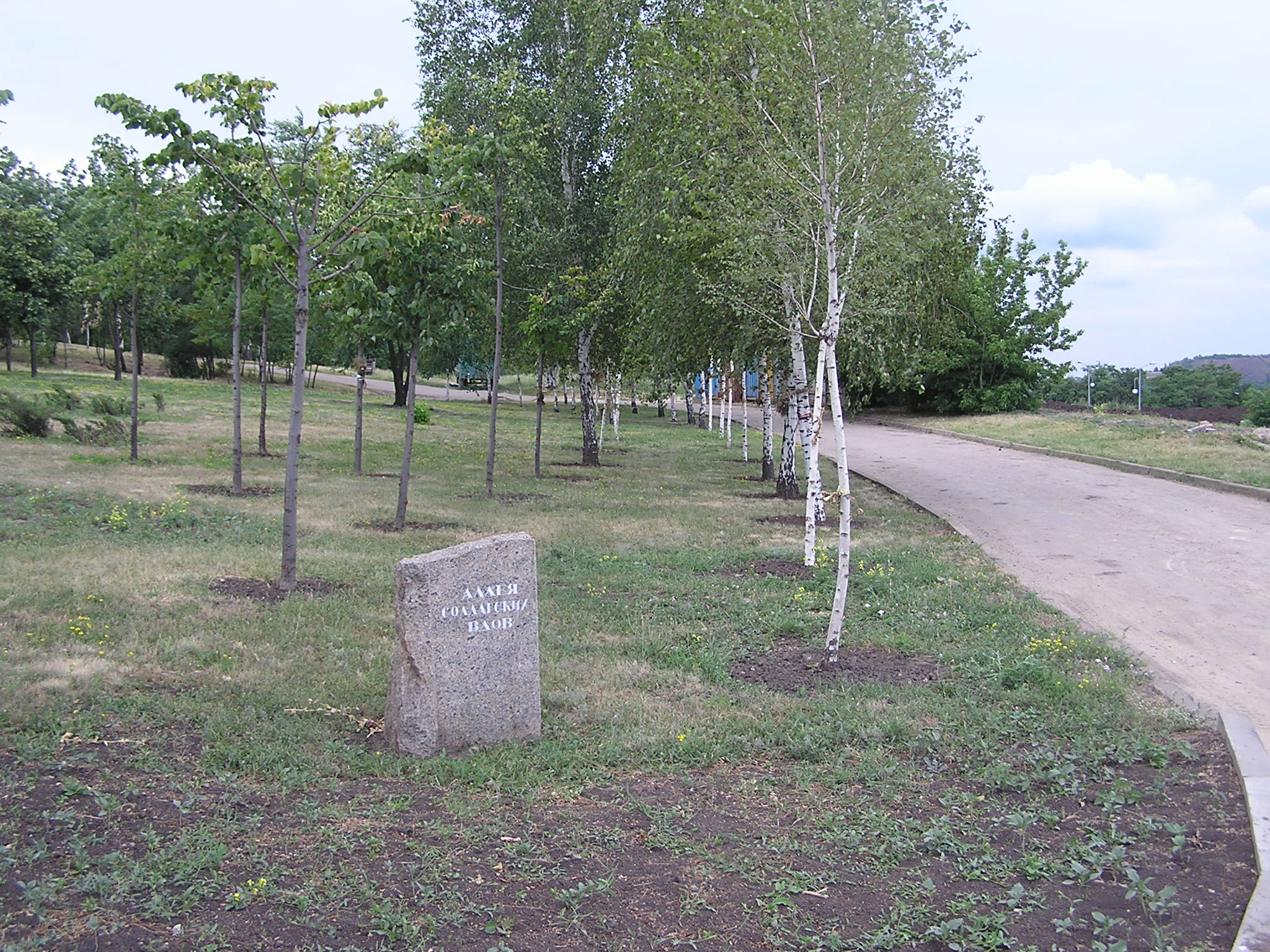
Alley of soldiers' widows

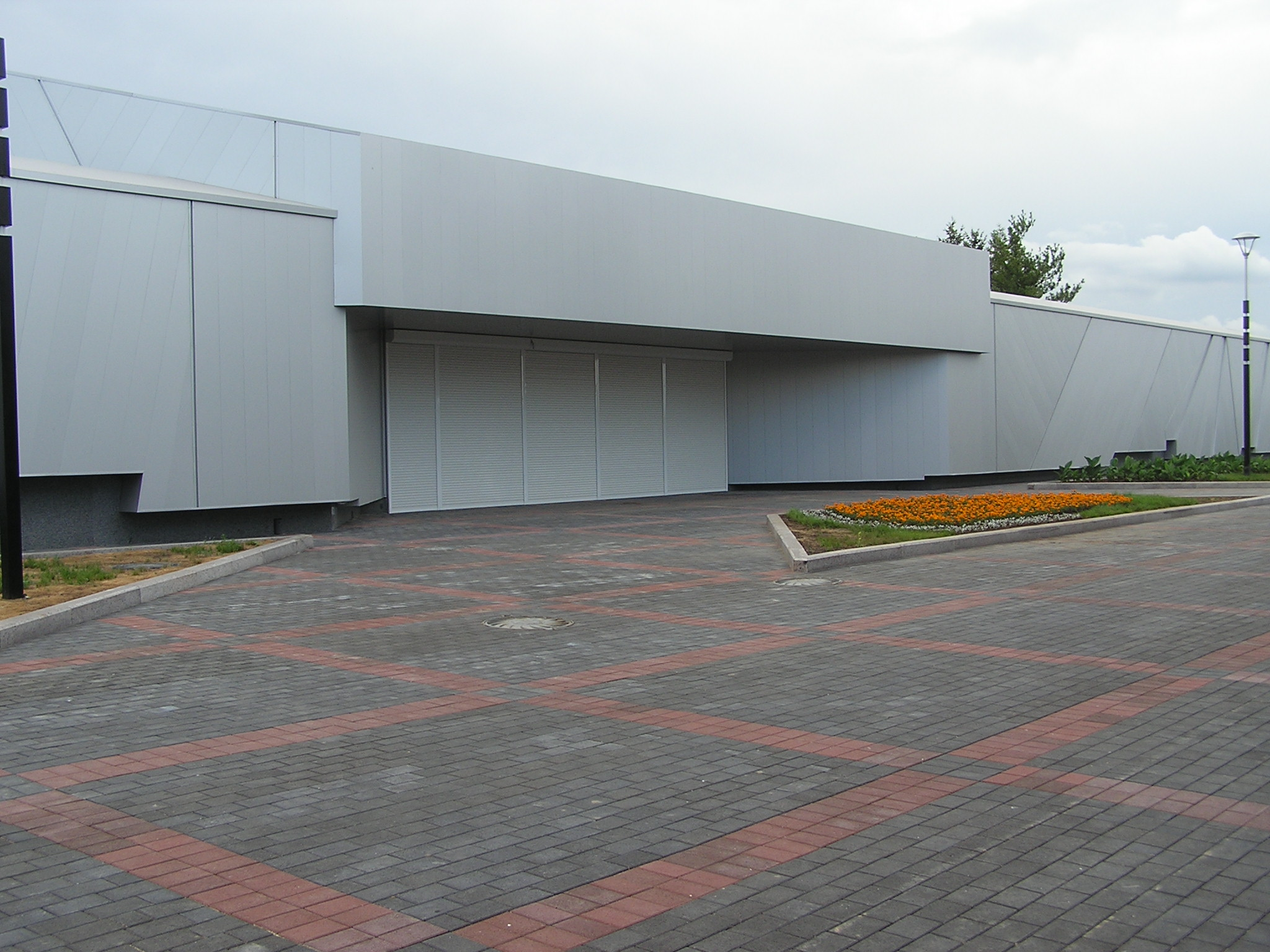
Museum

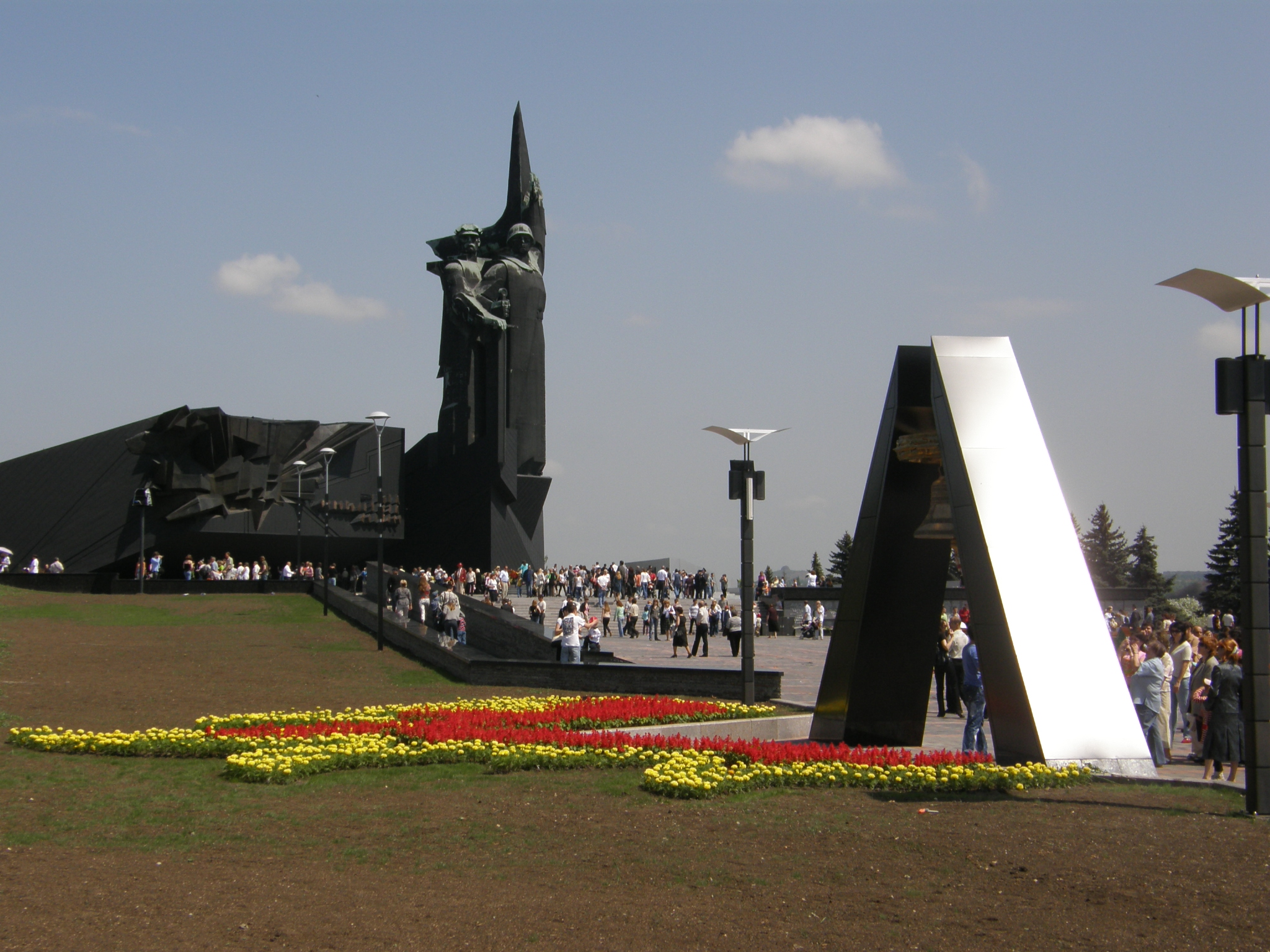
Victory Day, 2010

== See also ==
- Lenin Komsomol park
