= Donbas Arena =

Football stadium in Donetsk, Ukraine

- UEFA Category 4 Stadium
- Interactive map of Donbas Arena
- Location: Donetsk, Ukraine
- Coordinates: 48°1′15″N 37°48′35″E
- Owner: Shakhtar Donetsk
- Operator: Donbas Arena
- Capacity: 52,187
- Surface: Grass
- Field size: 105 m × 68 m (344 ft × 223 ft)

Construction
- Groundbreaking: 27 June 2006
- Opened: 29 August 2009; 17 years ago
- Closed: 2014 (due to war in Donbas)
- Cost: ₴ 545 million
- Architect: Arup Sports
- General contractor: ENKA

Tenant
- Shakhtar Donetsk (2009–2014)

Donbas Arena (Ukrainian: Донбас Арена [donˈbɑs ɐˈrɛnɐ]; Russian: Донбасс Арена, romanized: Donbass Arena) is a football stadium in Donetsk, that opened on 29 August 2009. The facility is located in the center of the city, in the Comsomol park. With a capacity of 55,187 spectators, the stadium used to host Shakhtar Donetsk matches and also hosted some matches of UEFA Euro 2012. The final cost of construction for Donbas Arena was $400 million. The stadium has been indefinitely closed to the public since mid-May 2014, due to the war in Donbas and Russo-Ukrainian war. Shakhtar Donetsk l played their most recent game at the ground on 2 May 2014 against Illichivets Mariupol.

The name of the stadium represents the simplified and shortened name of the Donets Basin—huge industrial region of Donbas, hence—Donbas (Ukrainian: Донецький басейн or Донбас).

== Construction and design ==
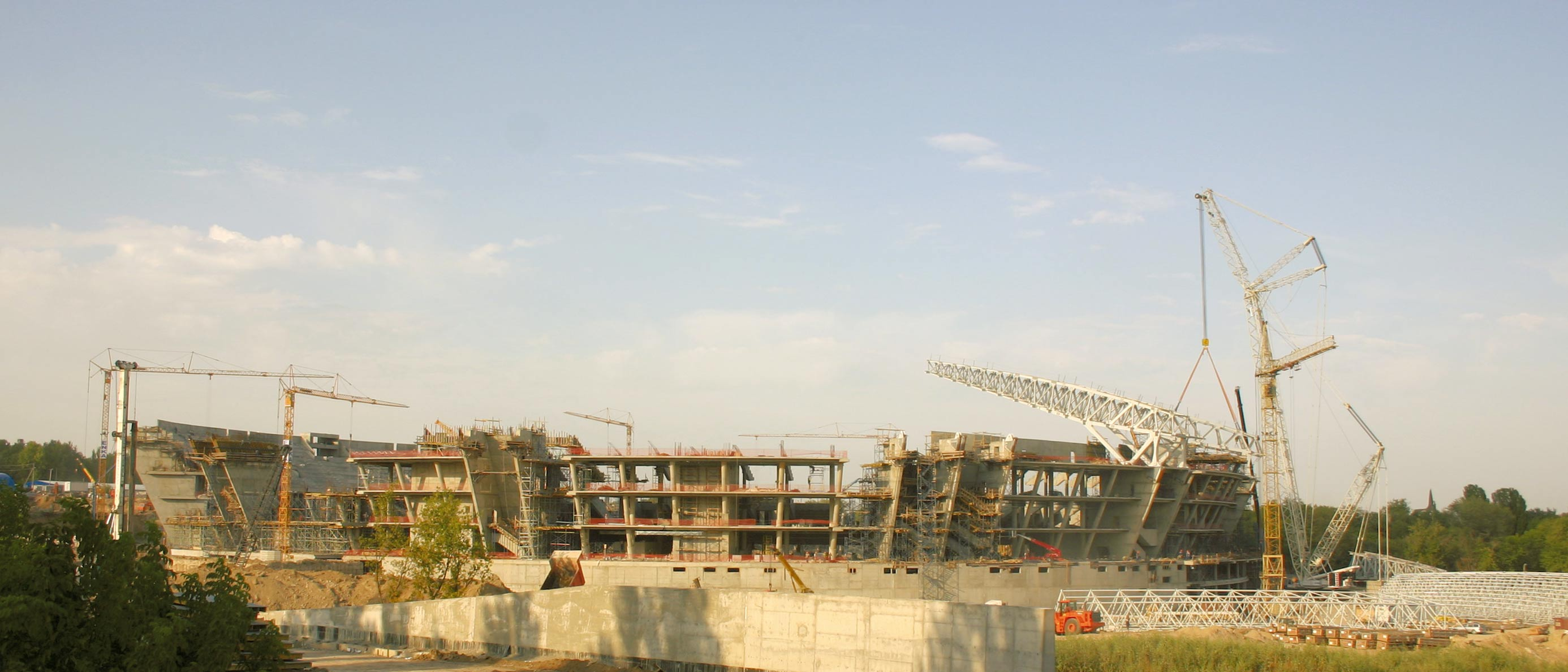
Construction site in August 2007

Construction began in 2006. The general contractor was a Turkish company ENKA. The Stadium was completed and opened in 2009. About 1,600 specialists, mainly Turkish, were involved in the construction.

Donbas Arena was designed by ArupSport. It was Project Managed by Arup Major Projects (Project Director Charles Goddard). Arup Sport also designed the City of Manchester Stadium (Manchester, England), Allianz Arena (Munich, Germany) and the Beijing National Stadium (Beijing, China). The soaring roof effect makes the Stadium resemble a flying saucer. The stadium has an oval shape and a glazed façade and is located near Regional Sport Complex Olimpiyskyi. The roof of the stadium slopes from north to south matching the landscape and contributing to the natural lighting and airing of the pitch. The external lighting makes the Stadium shine at night. A major design consideration was the ongoing protection of as much of the forest setting as possible (each tree having been planted in commemoration of deceased family members in the Great Patriotic War, and the exclusion zones to the neighbouring war memorials. A major geotechnical fault exists some 100m below the ground directly under the centre-spot. The building's foundations and piling was a major sub-project.

== Opening ==
Donetsk Donbas Arena in 2012

The Donbas Arena was completed ahead of schedule, but the grand opening was delayed until 29 August 2009 to coincide with the Ukrainian holiday of Miners Day, as well as Donetsk City day. Donetsk is in the Donbas region, a mining region, and the date was chosen for its symbolism. The primary tenant of the facility is the local professional football club Shakhtar Donetsk ("Donetsk Coal Miners").

American Pop/R&B singer-songwriter Beyoncé performed a show from her I Am... World Tour on the opening night of the new stadium. It was Knowles' first performance in Ukraine. Beyoncé performed her famous hit Halo to honour the memory of Michael Jackson, who would have had his birthday on that day.

Many state officials attended the show designed by K-events Filmmaster Group. The opening ceremony was awarded as Event of the Year at the Stadium Business Awards on 18 June 2010 in Dublin.

Shakhtar Donetsk's first match at the stadium was a 4–0 victory in a 2009–10 Ukrainian Premier League fixture on 27 September 2009 against FC Obolon Kyiv. The first international game took place on 18 November 2009 against Greece, which Ukraine lost 0–1 failing to qualify for the 2010 FIFA World Cup.

== UEFA Euro 2012 matches ==
Donbas Arena was included in the official bidding project submitted by Poland and Ukraine for hosting UEFA Euro 2012. The stadium was one of the venues for the UEFA Euro 2012. The stadium hosted group D stage games and one quarter-final and one semi-final game (with the other matches in that group played at Olimpiyskyi National Sports Complex). Unlike most new stadiums being built in Poland and Ukraine, Donbass Arena was not specifically built for the tournament.

The following matches were played at the stadium during the UEFA Euro 2012:

| Date | Time (CEST / EEST) | Team #1 | Res. | Team #2 | Round | Scorer(s) |
|---|---|---|---|---|---|---|
| 11 June 2012 | 18:00 / 19:00 | France | 1–1 | England | Group D | Joleon Lescott; Samir Nasri |
| 15 June 2012 | 18:00 / 19:00 | France | 2–0 | Ukraine | Group D | Jérémy Ménez; Yohan Cabaye |
| 19 June 2012 | 20:45 / 21:45 | England | 1–0 | Ukraine | Group D | Wayne Rooney |
| 23 June 2012 | 20:45 / 21:45 | Spain | 2–0 | France | Quarter-final | Xabi Alonso (2) |
| 27 June 2012 | 20:45 / 21:45 | Portugal | 0–0 (a.e.t.) (2–4 p) | Spain | Semi-final | — |

== Other uses ==
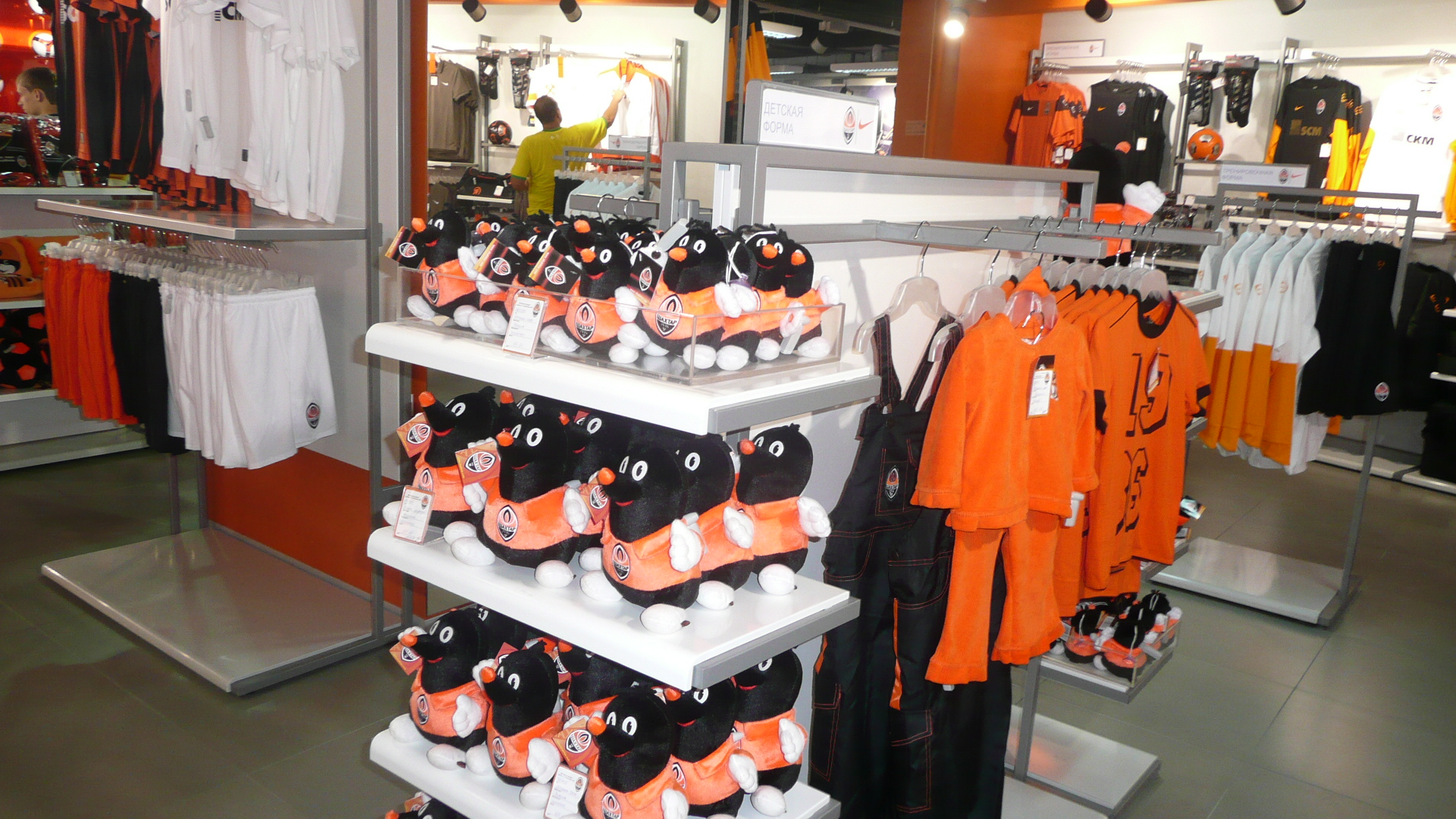
Merchandise in the Shakhtar shop

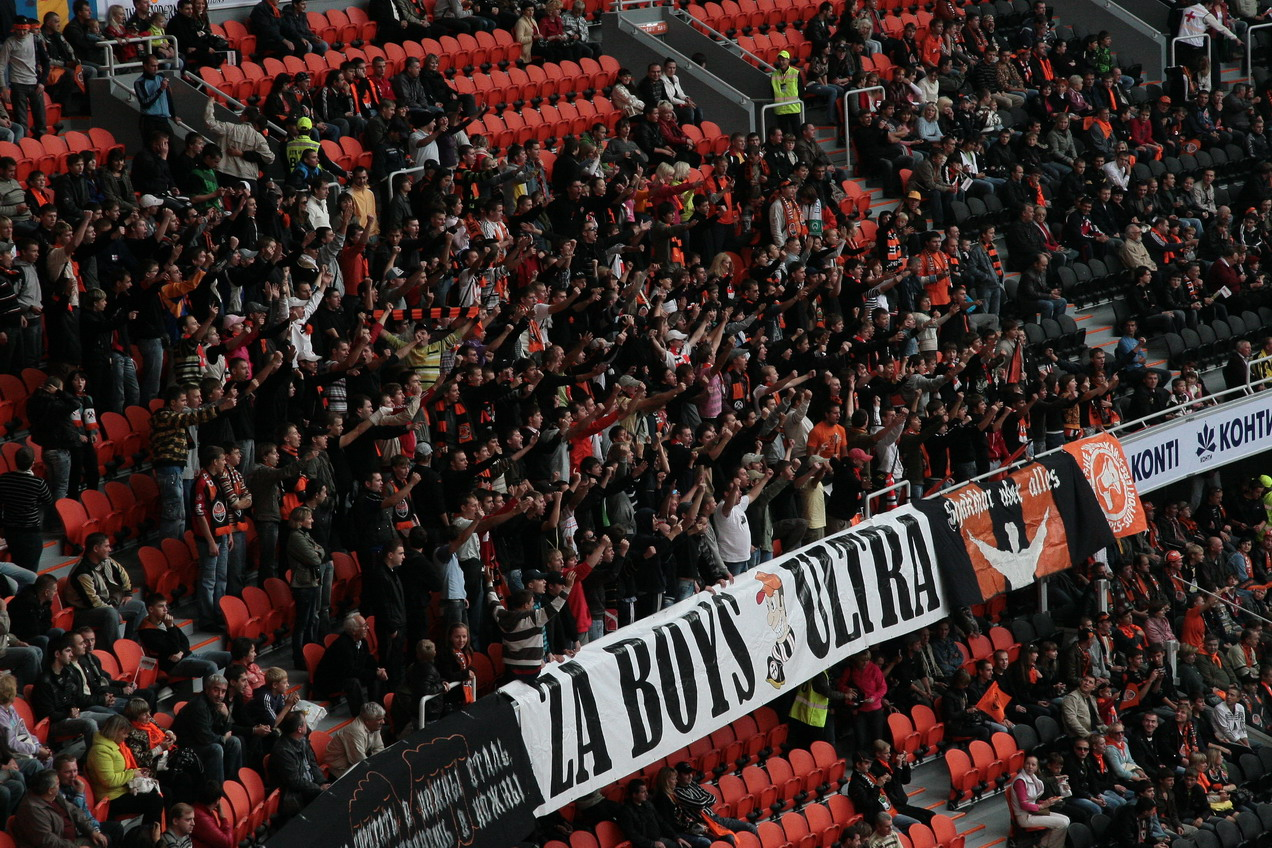
Shakhtar Ultras in the stadium

The project of new stadium "Donbas Arena" was conceived long before Ukraine was named as co-host of Euro 2012. The owner considered the possibility of daily use of the arena. "Donbas Arena" includes three restaurants, a lounge-bar, a fan cafe, numerous fast-food outlets, retail outlets, a fitness center, corporate boxes and first aid rooms. The stadium also provides facilities for corporate events - presentations, press conferences, celebrations and concerts. Stadium tours are available which include an examination of the unique features of Donbas Arena, a visit to the footballers' rooms and FC Shakhtar Museum and a visit to the FC Shakhtar brand shop for souvenirs.

The stadium was an inspiration for one of the multiplayer maps in the 2020 battle royale video game Call of Duty: Warzone, which depicts several real-life locations in Donetsk.

== Russo-Ukrainian War ==
On 20 May 2014, the stadium hosted a small "Peace March" against the violence of the 2014 pro-Russian unrest in Ukraine and the self-proclaimed Donetsk People's Republic.

On 22 August 2014, the stadium was damaged by what was reported to be artillery shelling, as the Ukrainian armed forces clashed with pro-Russian separatists for control of the city.

On 20 October 2014, the stadium was again damaged by what was reported to be artillery shelling. This time, the stadium sustained damage to the east and west sides and at least one large glass panel fell near a young girl.

Since July 2014, due to the danger of the ongoing conflict in Donetsk, Shakhtar used the Arena Lviv in the city of Lviv in western Ukraine (600 miles (970 km) away from Donetsk) as their temporary home ground. In early 2017, the club moved their home games to the Metalist Stadium in Kharkiv (183 miles (295 km) to the north-west of Donetsk). Additionally, the club's administrative headquarters and player training sessions have been re-located to the capital city of Kyiv.

The stadium has remained unused and closed to the public since FC Shakhtar were forced to abandon it.

=== Russian invasion of Ukraine ===
In March 2022, during the Russian invasion of Ukraine, the Donbas Arena Football infrastructure continued to suffer from the war in Ukraine. The main stadium of Donetsk suffered some damage.

=== Re-opening ===
In April and June 2026, Denis Pushilin, head of the Donetsk People's Republic (DPR) which is the authority de facto controlling the stadium, stated that the stadium will be renovated with assistance from the Russian government, and that an agreement had already been reached between the DPR and Moscow. The stadium is also said to be re-opened once renovations are completed and security threats are ended.
