= Kyivskyi District, Donetsk =

Coordinates: 48.046387°N 37.762044°E

Kyivskyi District Київський район
- Urban district
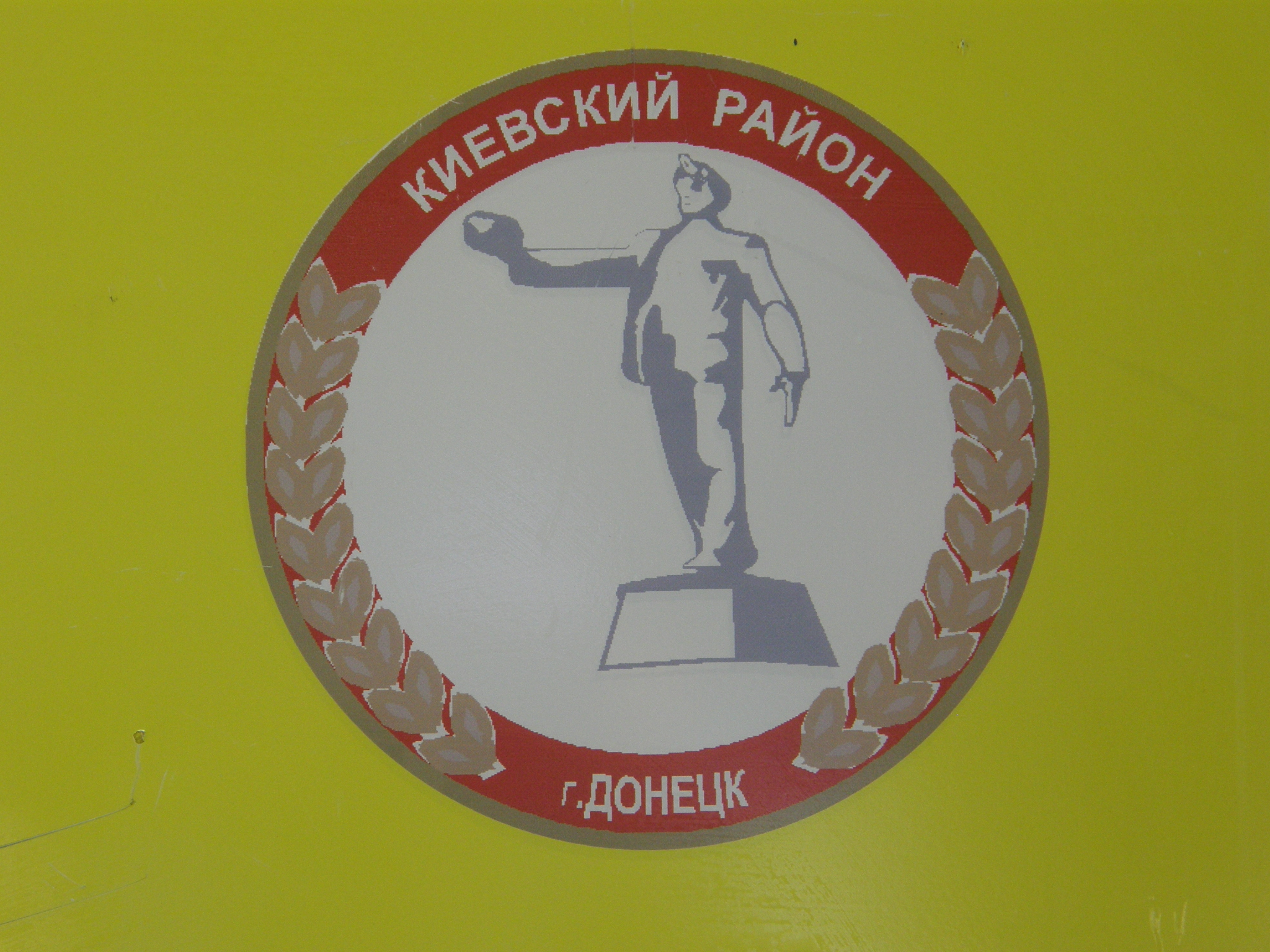
- Coat of arms
- Interactive map of Kyivskyi District
- Country: Ukraine
- Oblast: Donetsk Oblast

Area
  - Total: 37.87 km^{2} (14.62 sq mi)

Population
  - Total: 139,177
- Time zone: UTC+2 (EET)
  - Summer (DST): UTC+3 (EEST)

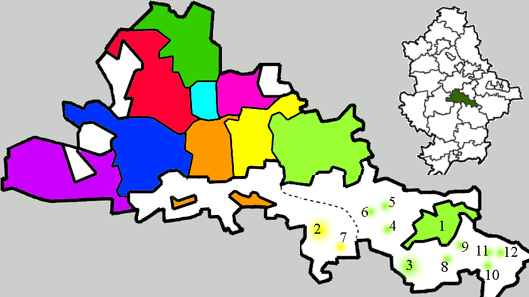
Districts of Donetsk on the territory of the Donetsk City Municipality: Budonivskyi District Voroshylovskyi District Kalininskyi District Kyivskyi District Kirovskyi District / Kuibyshevskyi District Leninskyi District Petrovskyi District Proletarskyi District

Kyivskyi District (Ukrainian: Київський район, romanized: Kyivskyi raion) is urban district of the city of Donetsk, Ukraine, named after the capital city of Ukraine, Kyiv.

== Places ==
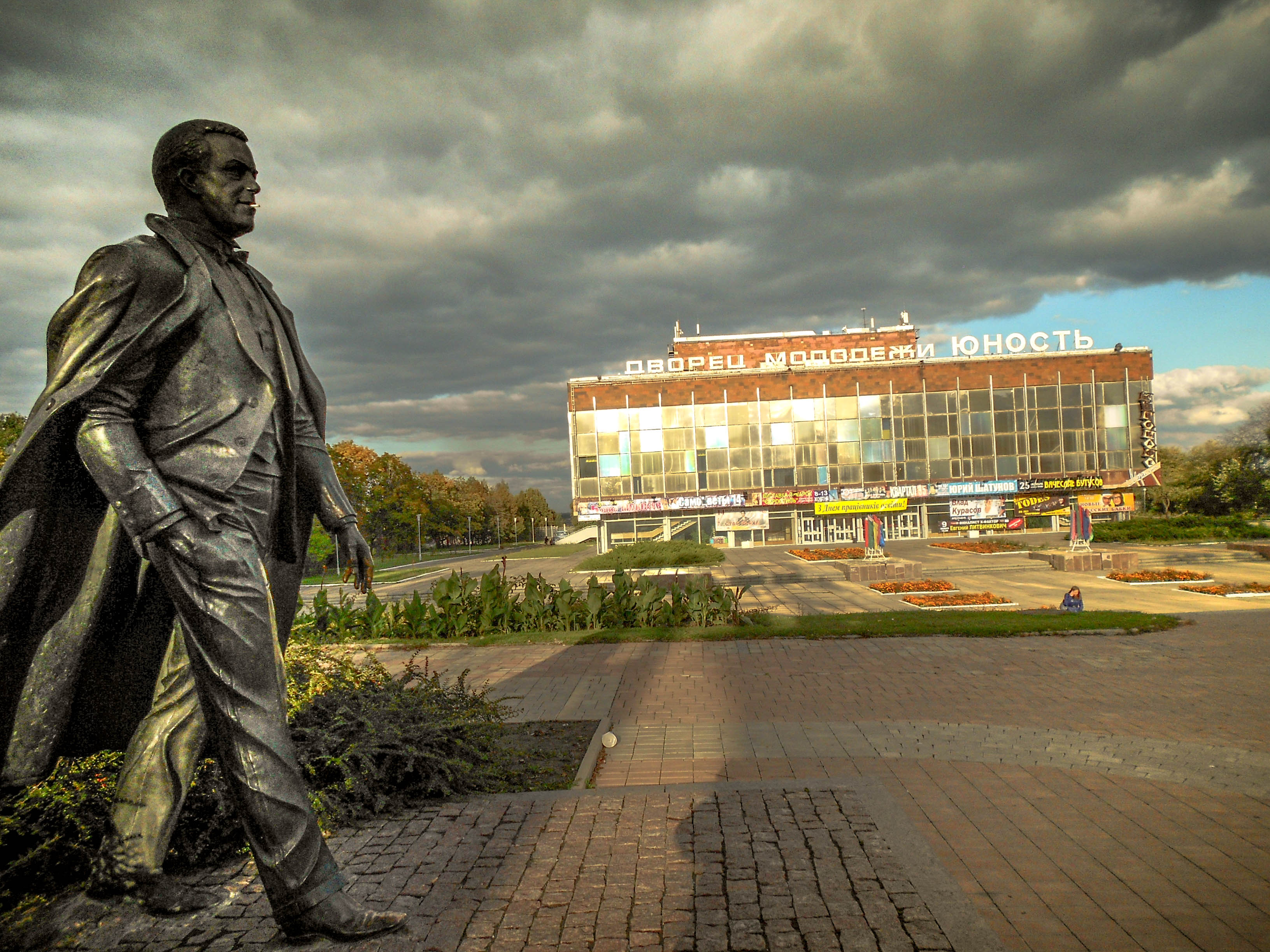
Monument to Joseph Kobzon and the Palace of Youth Yunost, 2013

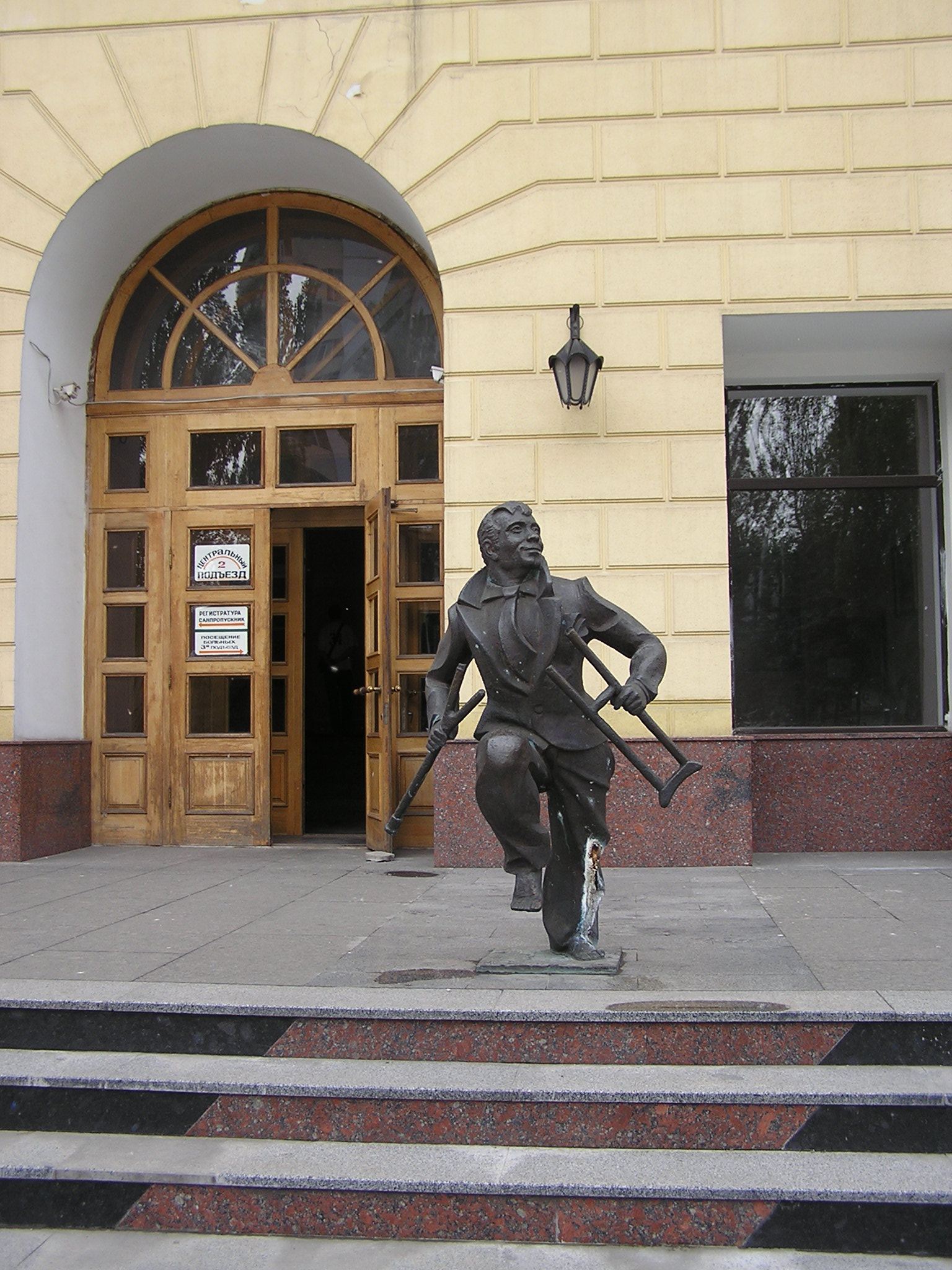
Monument of recovered patient

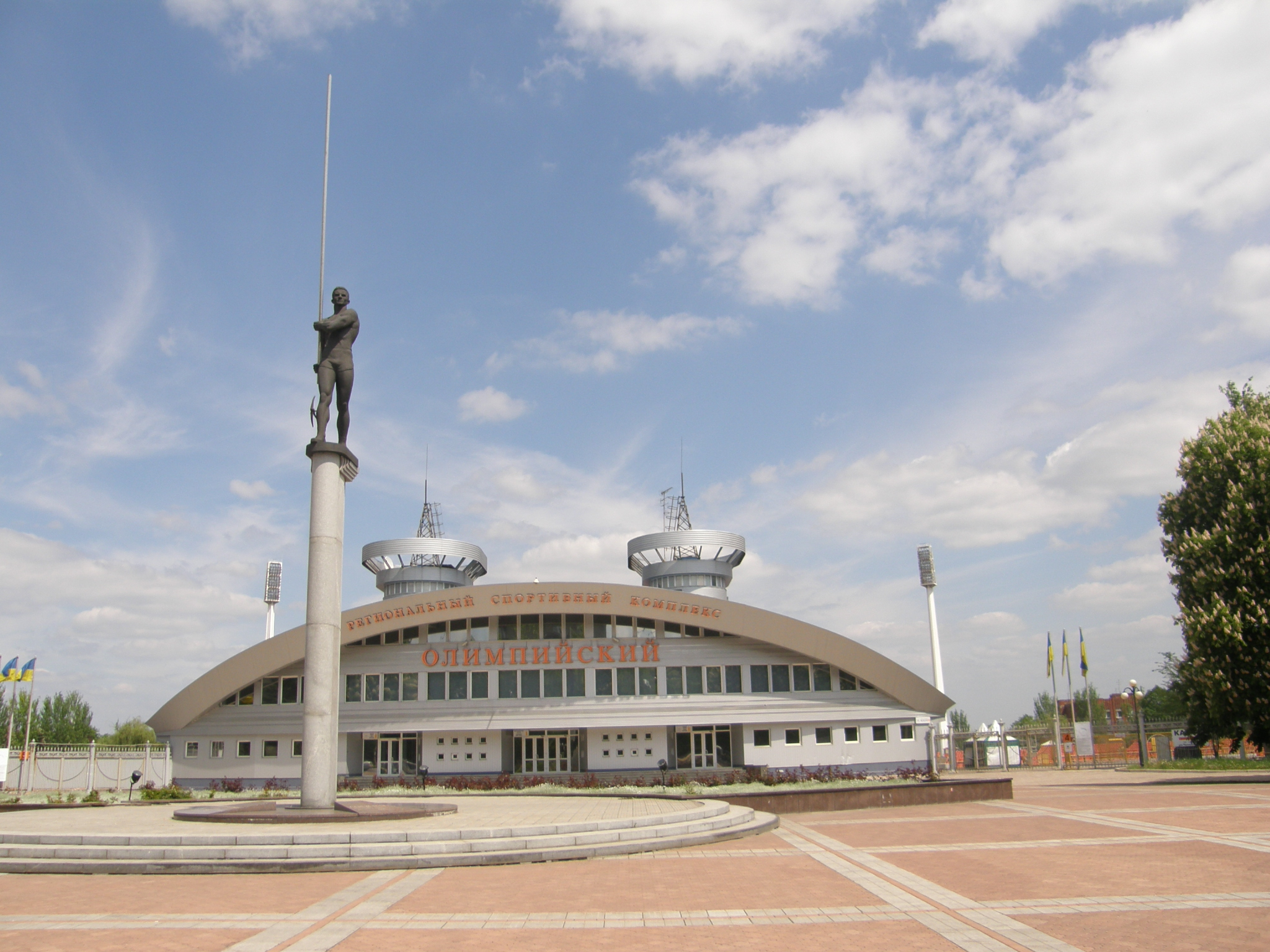
Monument to Sergei Bubka in front of the RSK Olimpiisky, 2009

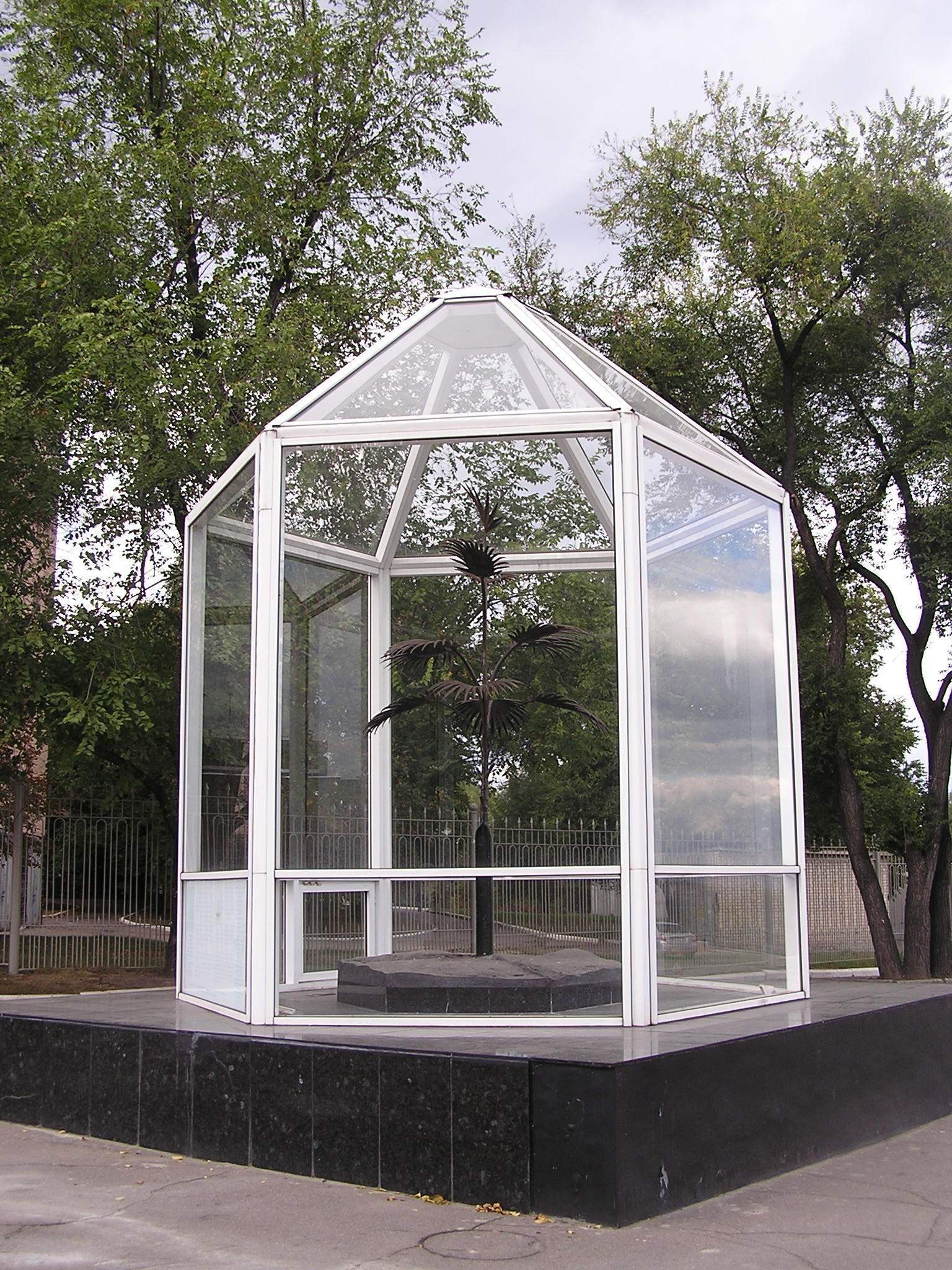
Palm tree of Aleksei Mertsalov

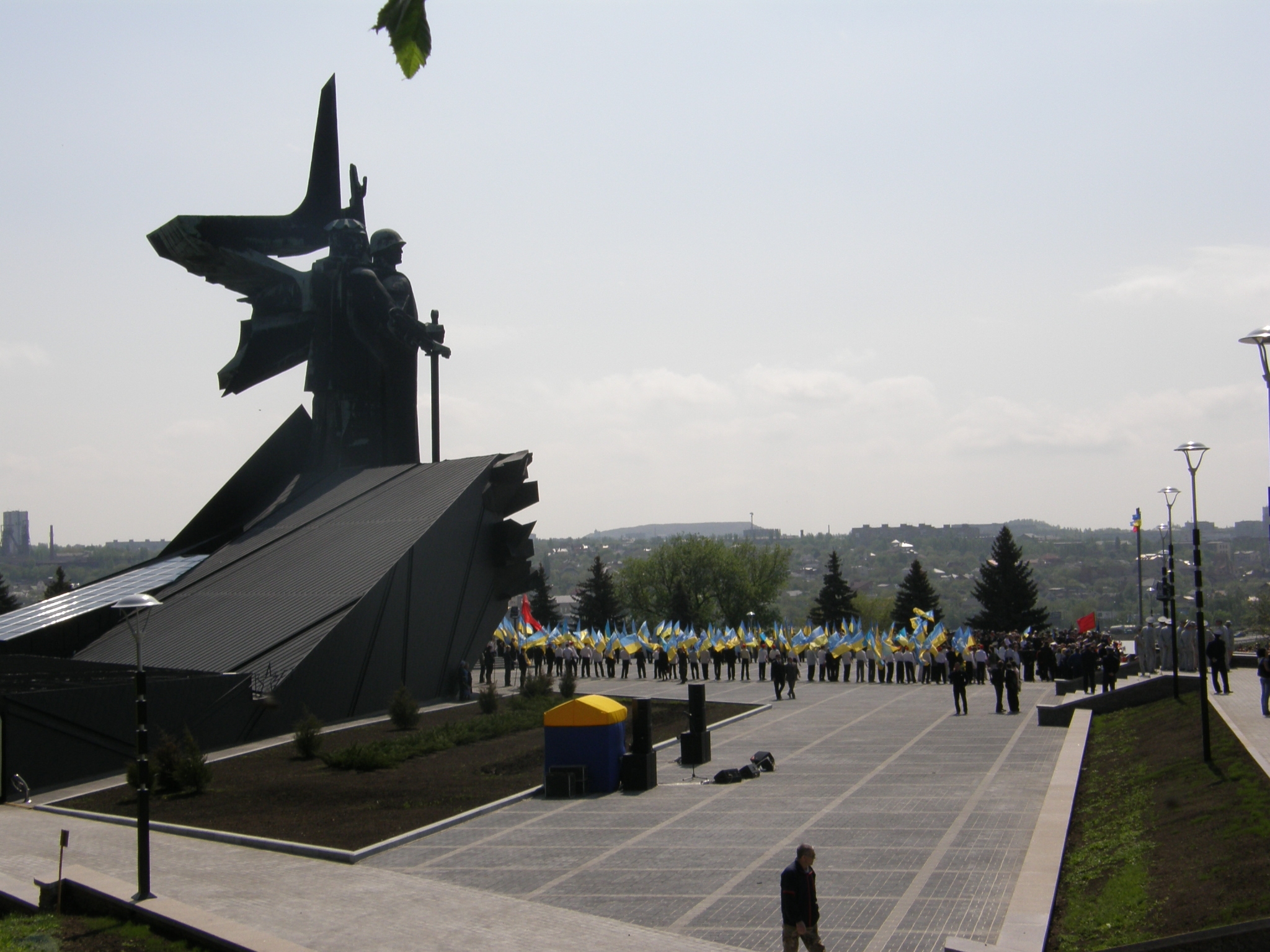
Monument to liberators at the Komsomol Park, 2010

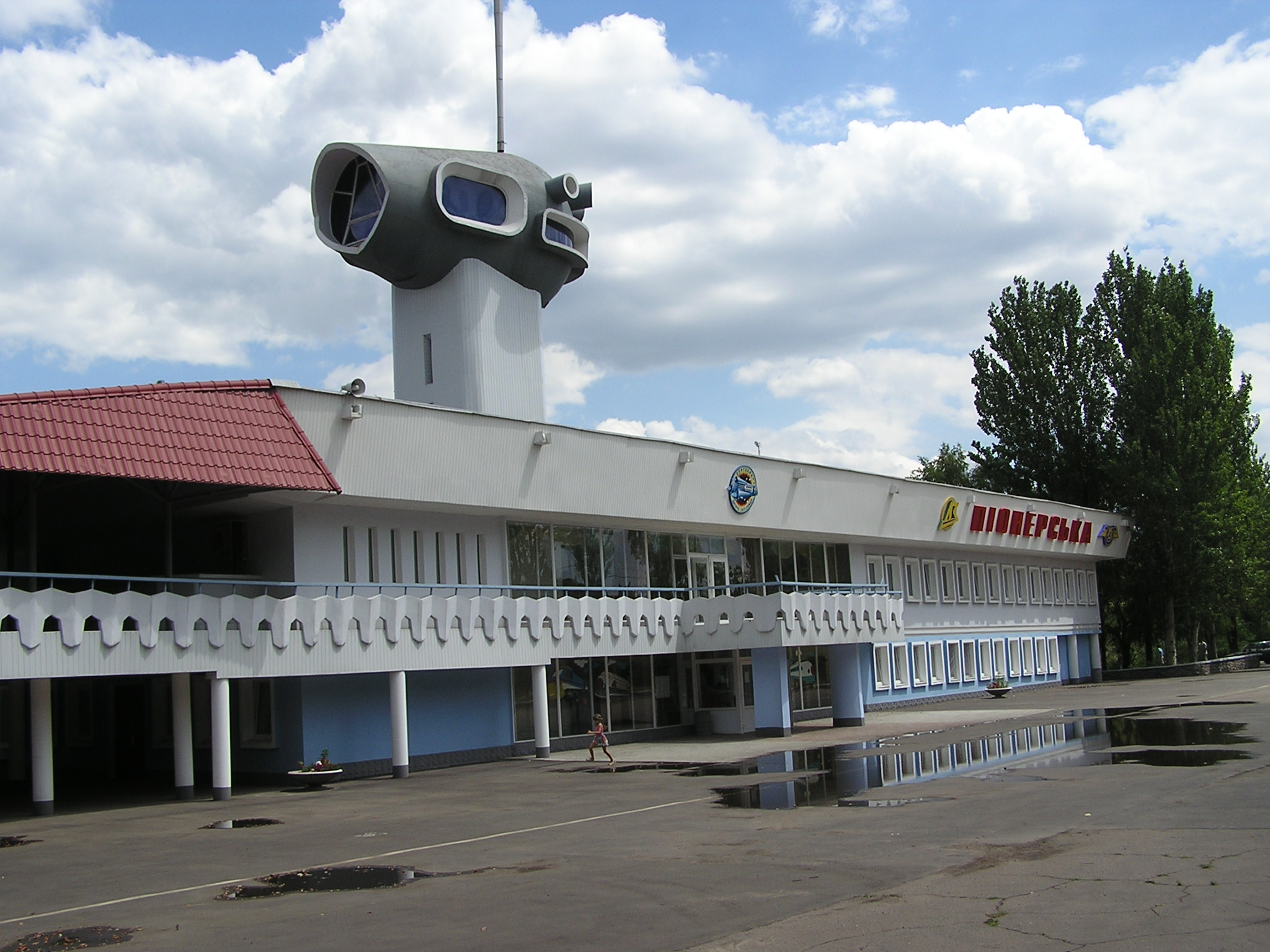
Pionerskaya Station of the Donetsk children railroad

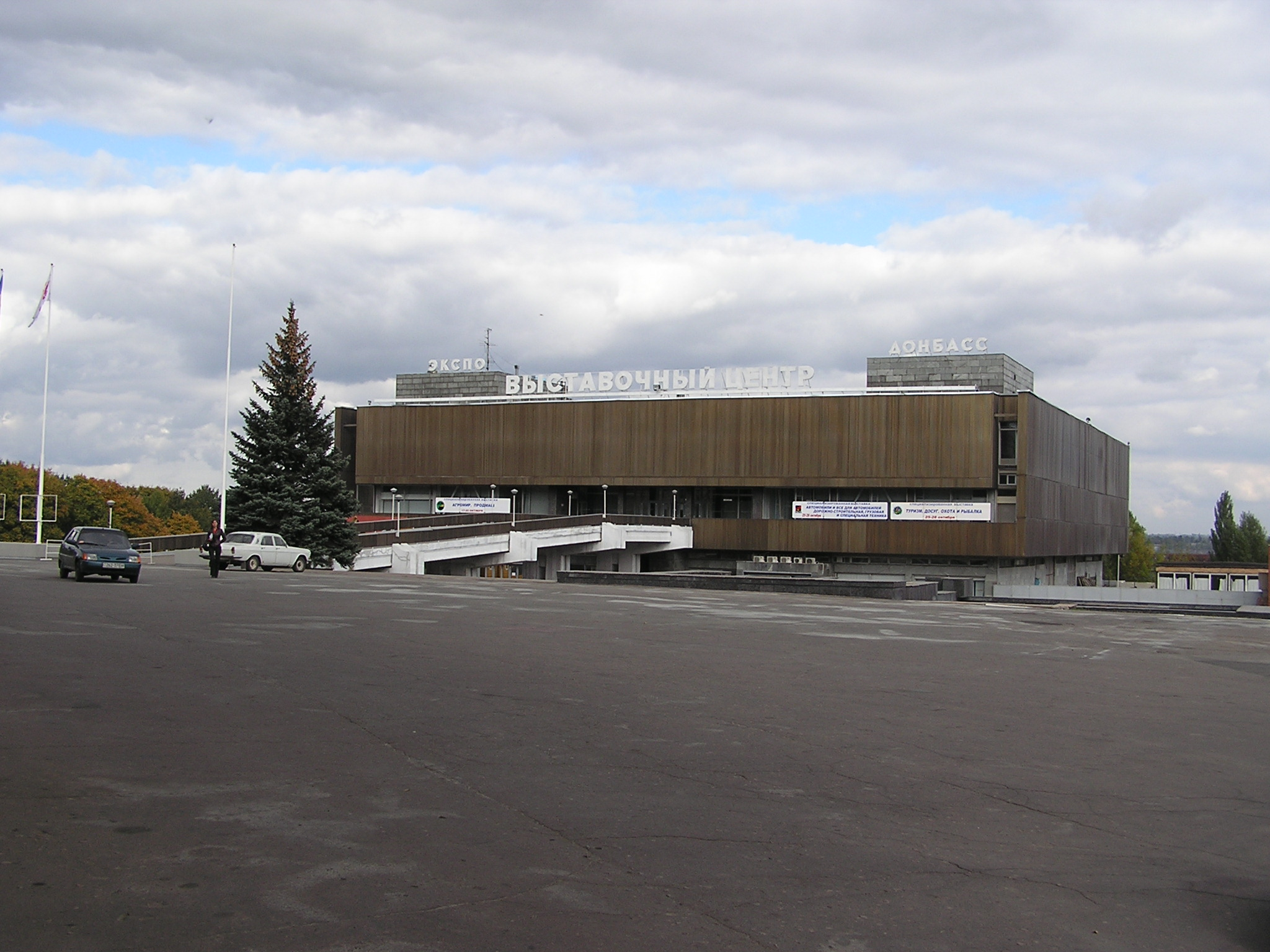
Donbas Exhibition Center

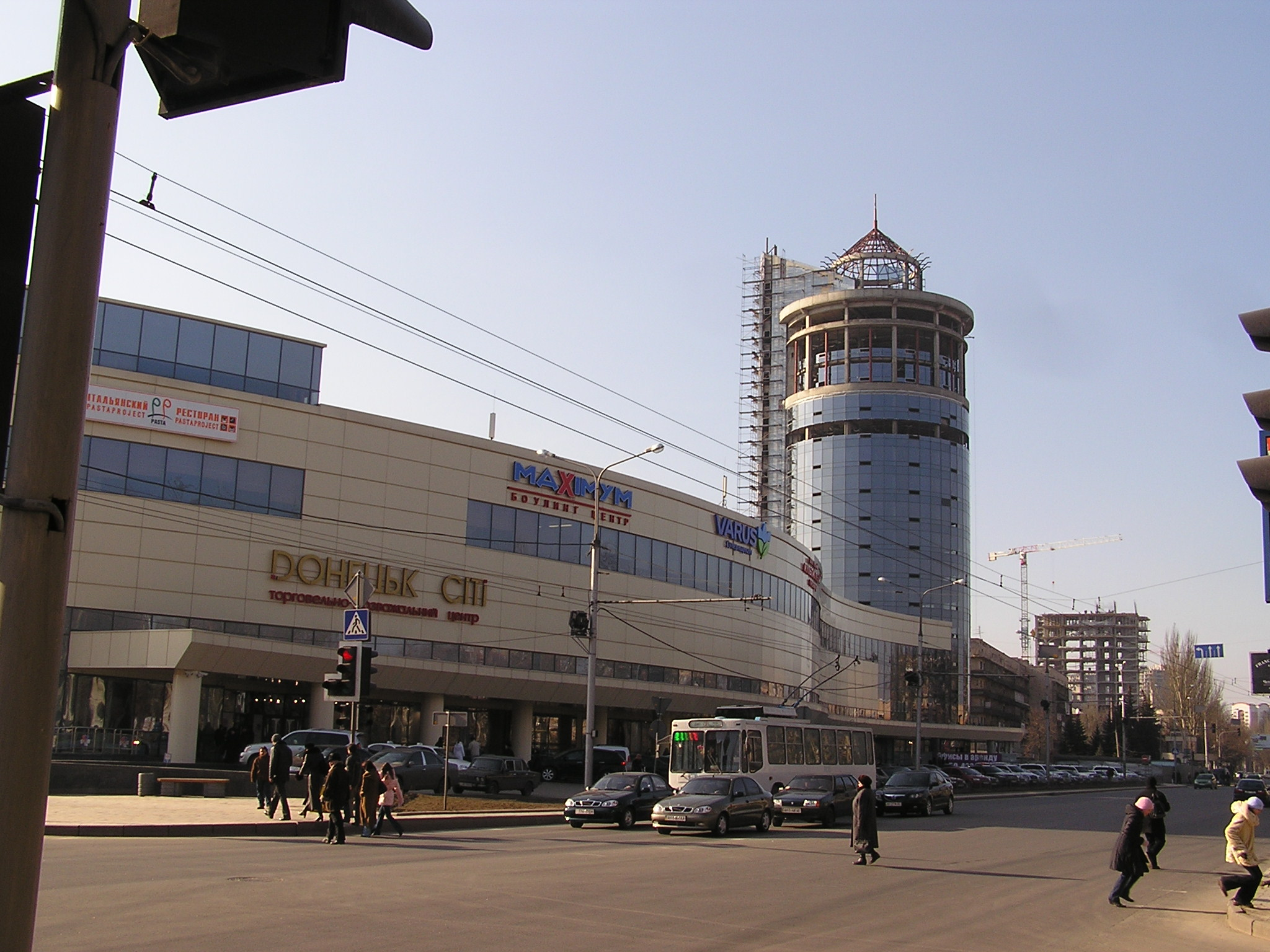
Donetsk City shopping center
