= List of twin towns and sister cities in Ukraine =

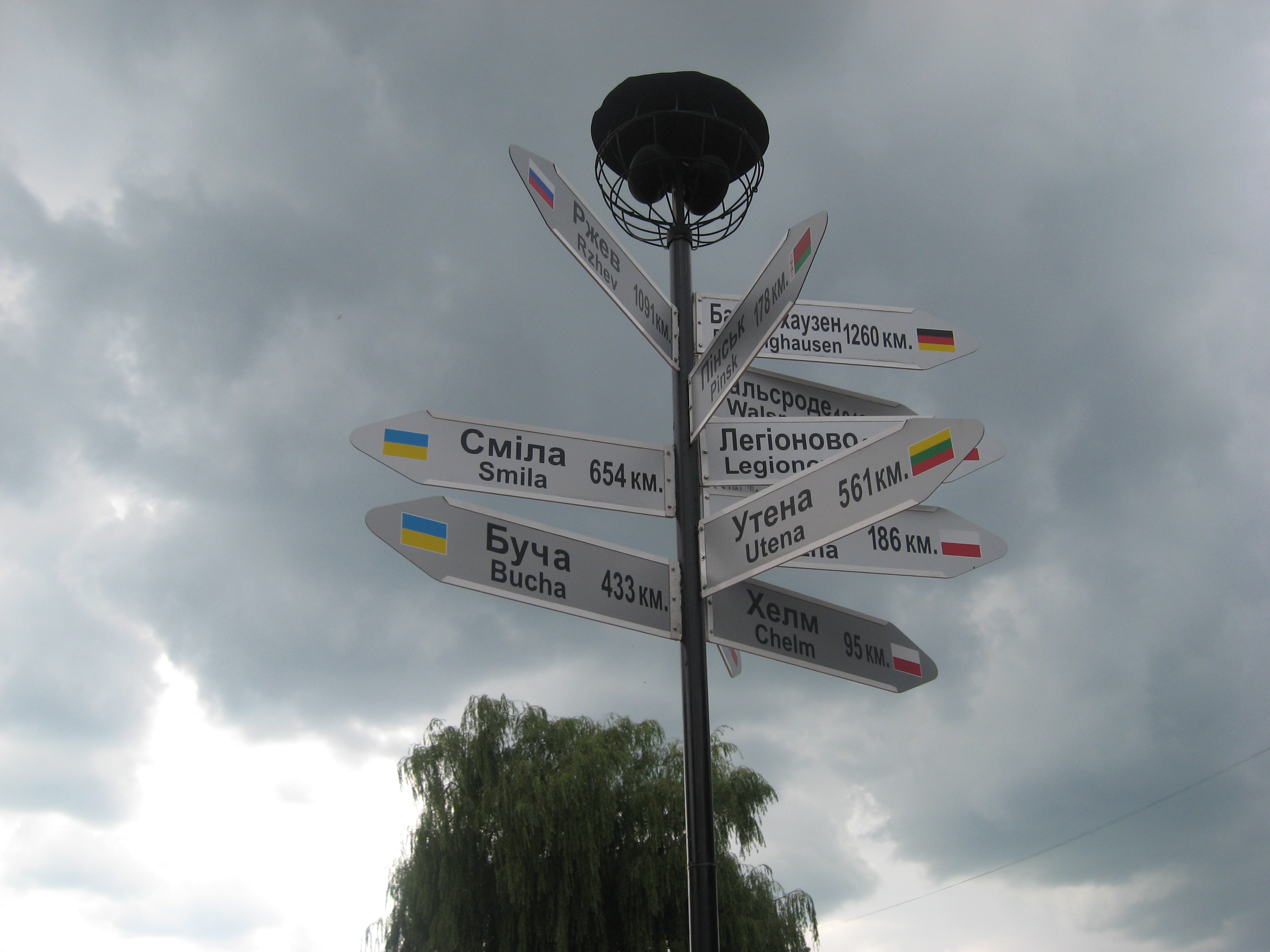
Twin towns of Kovel in 2009

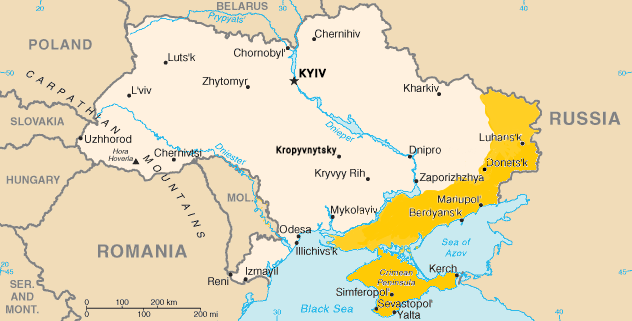
Map of Ukraine during the Russian invasion of Ukraine

There are many places in Ukraine which have standing links to local communities in other countries known as "town twinning" (usually in Europe) or "sister cities" (usually in the rest of the world).

== A ==
Alchevsk

- Chystiakove, Ukraine
- Dąbrowa Górnicza, Poland
- Dunaújváros, Hungary
- Feodosia, Ukraine

Alushta

- Äänekoski, Finland
- Angarsk, Russia
- Capri, Italy
- Cassis, France
- Dubna, Russia
- Feodosia, Ukraine
- Georgiyevsk, Russia
- Krasnodon, Ukraine
- Ladushkin, Russia
- Nerekhtsky District, Russia
- Pesterzsébet (Budapest), Hungary
- Santa Cruz, United States
- Sozopol, Bulgaria
- Tambov, Russia

== B ==
Bar

- Kwidzyn, Poland
- Rybnik, Poland

Berdiansk

- Beibei (Chongqing), China
- Bielsko-Biała, Poland
- Glyfada, Greece
- Haisyn, Ukraine
- Horodenka, Ukraine
- Kremenchuk, Ukraine
- Lowell, United States
- (Georgia (country)) Poti, Georgia
- La Seyne-sur-Mer, France
- Yambol, Bulgaria

Berdychiv

- Alytus, Lithuania
- Jawor, Poland
- Siedlce, Poland

Berehove

- Budapest, Hungary
- Dunajská Streda, Slovakia
- Ferencváros (Budapest), Hungary
- Hajdúböszörmény, Hungary
- Hatvan, Hungary
- Kecskemét, Hungary
- Kráľovský Chlmec, Slovakia
- Maassluis, Netherlands
- Mosonmagyaróvár, Hungary
- Odorheiu Secuiesc, Romania
- Przeworsk, Poland
- Sárrétudvari, Hungary
- Satu Mare, Romania
- Tiszaújváros, Hungary
- Vásárosnamény, Hungary
- Zalaegerszeg, Hungary

Bila Tserkva

- Bijelo Polje, Montenegro
- Itea, Greece
- Kremenchuk, Ukraine
- Ostrowiec Świętokrzyski, Poland
- Púchov, Slovakia
- (Georgia (country)) Senaki, Georgia
- Solomianskyi District (Kyiv), Ukraine
- Tarnów, Poland

Bolhrad

- Comrat, Moldova
- Shklow, Belarus

Boryslav

- Dydnia, Poland
- Jeżowe, Poland
- Sanok (rural gmina), Poland
- Starogard Gdański, Poland
- Wałbrzych, Poland
- Zarszyn, Poland

Boryspil

- Callao, Peru
- Fiumicino, Italy
- Hopkins, United States
- Vantaa, Finland

Boiarka

- Bziny, Slovakia
- (Georgia (country)) Martvili, Georgia
- (Georgia (country)) Ozurgeti, Georgia
- Puławy, Poland

Brody

- Bełżyce, Poland
- Mogilno, Poland
- Šaštín-Stráže, Slovakia
- Strzyżów County, Poland
- Żychlin, Poland

Brovary

- Fontenay-sous-Bois, France
- Gniezno County, Poland
- Grodzisk County, Poland
- Kraśnik County, Poland
- Rockford, United States
- Santa Marinella, Italy
- Sillamäe, Estonia
- Tonalá, Mexico

Bucha

- Albany, United States
- Bergamo, Italy
- Bergisch Gladbach, Germany
- Bilhorod-Dnistrovskyi, Ukraine
- Bucsa, Hungary
- Cascais, Portugal
- Kavadarci, North Macedonia
- Kovel, Ukraine
- Ospedaletto Euganeo, Italy
- Palanga, Lithuania
- Pont-de-Chéruy, France
- Tiachiv, Ukraine
- Tuszyn, Poland

== C ==
Cherkasy

- Bydgoszcz, Poland
- Kuşadası, Turkey
- Madaba, Jordan
- Mazyr District, Belarus
- Petah Tikva, Israel
- (Georgia (country)) Rustavi, Georgia
- Santa Rosa, United States
- Sumgait, Azerbaijan
- Valmiera, Latvia
- Wanzhou (Chongqing), China

Chernihiv

- Aachen, Germany
- Gabrovo, Bulgaria
- Hradec Králové, Czech Republic
- Memmingen, Germany
- Ogre, Latvia
- Lappeenranta, Finland
- Petah Tikva, Israel
- Prilep, North Macedonia
- Rzeszów, Poland
- Tarnobrzeg, Poland
- White Plains, United States

Chernivtsi

- Bălți, Moldova
- Chișinău, Moldova
- Düsseldorf, Germany
- Iași, Romania
- İzmir, Turkey
- Klagenfurt, Austria
- Konin, Poland
- Mannheim, Germany
- Metz, France
- Nof HaGalil, Israel
- Rueil-Malmaison, France
- Salt Lake City, United States
- Saskatoon, Canada
- Suceava, Romania
- Timișoara, Romania

Chop

- Bicske, Hungary
- Čierna nad Tisou, Slovakia
- Milove, Ukraine
- Sokołów Małopolski, Poland
- Záhony, Hungary

Chornomorsk

- Beyoğlu, Turkey
- Erie, United States
- Haikou, China
- Maardu, Estonia
- Municipio XV (Rome), Italy
- (Georgia (country)) Poti, Georgia
- Sinaia, Romania
- Tczew, Poland

Chortkiv

- Bad Soden-Salmünster, Germany
- Béziers, France
- Căușeni, Moldova
- Dobrodzień, Poland
- Grosuplje, Slovenia
- Karlskrona, Sweden
- Korczyna, Poland
- Leżajsk, Poland
- Talsi, Latvia
- Whitehorse, Canada
- Zawadzkie, Poland

Chuhuiv

- Kozienice, Poland
- Stary Sącz, Poland

Chystiakove

- Alchevsk, Ukraine
- Sallaumines, France
- Świętochłowice, Poland

== D ==
Dnipro

- Amarillo, United States
- Cologne, Germany
- Durham, Canada
- Herzliya, Israel
- (Georgia (country)) Kutaisi, Georgia
- Ostrava, Czech Republic
- Szczecin, Poland
- Tashkent, Uzbekistan
- Vilnius, Lithuania
- Xi'an, China
- Žilina, Slovakia

Dolyna

- Grodzisk Wielkopolski, Poland
- Montigny-le-Bretonneux, France
- Niemodlin, Poland
- Nowa Sarzyna, Poland
- Orhei, Moldova
- Prairie Village, United States
- Rubizhne, Ukraine
- Târgu Lăpuș, Romania
- Zviahel, Ukraine

Donetsk

- Bochum, Germany
- Charleroi, Belgium
- Gomel, Belarus
- Kazan, Russia
- Kursk, Russia
- Pittsburgh, United States
- Samsun, Turkey
- Sheffield, England, United Kingdom
- Taiyuan, China
- Taranto, Italy
- Ulan-Ude, Russia
- Vilnius, Lithuania

Drohobych

- Buffalo, United States
- Bytom, Poland
- Dęblin, Poland
- Legnica, Poland
- Lipik, Croatia
- Muscatine, United States
- Nielisz, Poland
- Olecko, Poland
- Ostrzeszów County, Poland
- Przemyśl, Poland
- Sanok, Poland
- Smiltene, Latvia

Dubno

- Belogradchik, Bulgaria
- Czerwionka-Leszczyny, Poland
- Giżycko, Poland
- Sokołów Podlaski, Poland
- Uničov, Czech Republic

Dunaivtsi

- Brandýs nad Labem-Stará Boleslav, Czech Republic
- Turek, Poland

== F ==
Feodosia

- Alchevsk, Ukraine
- Alushta, Ukraine
- Armavir, Armenia
- Armavir, Russia
- Azov, Russia
- Eastern AO (Moscow), Russia
- Kalofer (Karlovo), Bulgaria
- Kronstadt, Russia
- Kursk, Russia
- Samara, Russia
- Shchyolkovo, Russia
- Tver, Russia
- Ulyanovsk, Russia

== H ==
Hola Prystan

- Cisnădie, Romania
- Hnivan, Ukraine
- Kaišiadorys, Lithuania
- Pinsk, Belarus
- Rîbnița, Moldova

Horishni Plavni

- Ungheni, Moldova
- Zhodzina, Belarus

Horlivka

- Barnsley, England, United Kingdom
- Buffalo, United States
- Pensacola, United States

Hostomel

- Řeporyje (Prague), Czech Republic

== I ==
Irpin

- Alboraya, Spain
- Alytus District Municipality, Lithuania
- Borna, Germany
- Cascais, Portugal
- Gernika-Lumo, Spain
- Kotsiubynske, Ukraine
- Miami, United States
- Milwaukee, United States
- (Georgia (country)) Mtskheta, Georgia
- Pisz, Poland
- Pyeongtaek, South Korea
- Smila, Ukraine
- Syracuse, United States
- Tlajomulco de Zúñiga, Mexico

Ivano-Frankivsk

- Arlington County, United States
- Baia Mare, Romania
- Braga, Portugal
- Chrzanów, Poland
- Chrzanów County, Poland
- Jelgava, Latvia
- Koszalin, Poland
- Lublin, Poland
- Nanning, China
- Nowa Sól County, Poland
- Ochota (Warsaw), Poland
- Opole, Poland
- Potsdam, Germany
- Přerov, Czech Republic
- (Georgia (country)) Rustavi, Georgia
- Rybnik, Poland
- Rzeszów, Poland
- Strășeni District, Moldova
- Świdnica, Poland
- Tomaszów Mazowiecki, Poland
- Trakai, Lithuania
- Zielona Góra, Poland

Iziaslav

- Brembate di Sopra, Italy
- Lovech, Bulgaria
- Ostrów Mazowiecka, Poland

Izium

- Andrychów, Poland
- (Georgia (country)) Khoni, Georgia
- Tukums, Latvia

== K ==
Kamianets-Podilskyi

- Athens, United States
- Brantford, Canada
- Cihanbeyli, Turkey
- Częstochowa, Poland
- Dolný Kubín, Slovakia
- Edineț, Moldova
- Esslingen am Neckar, Germany
- Herrljunga, Sweden
- Głogów, Poland
- Głogów County, Poland
- Gorzyce, Poland
- Hautmont, France
- Hrubieszów, Poland
- Kalisz, Poland
- Kutná Hora, Czech Republic
- Līvāni, Latvia
- Lublin, Poland
- Mariestad, Sweden
- Ponte Lambro, Italy
- Przemyśl, Poland
- Radoviš, North Macedonia
- Roman, Romania
- Sanok, Poland
- Sanok County, Poland
- Siret, Romania
- Targówek (Warsaw), Poland
- Tarnowo Podgórne, Poland
- Teruel, Spain
- Ukmergė, Lithuania
- Valle de Mena, Spain
- Włodawa, Poland
- Zalău, Romania
- Zawiercie, Poland

Kaniv

- Chełmno, Poland
- Człuchów, Poland
- Kobryn, Belarus
- Sonoma, United States
- Viersen, Germany
- Võru, Estonia
- Vyshhorod, Ukraine

Kerch

- Çanakkale, Turkey
- Smolensk, Russia
- Temryuksky District, Russia
- Tula, Russia

Kharkiv

- Bologna, Italy
- Brno, Czech Republic
- Cetinje, Montenegro
- Cincinnati, United States
- Daugavpils, Latvia
- Gaziantep, Turkey
- Geroskipou, Cyprus
- Jinan, China
- Kaunas, Lithuania
- (Georgia (country)) Kutaisi, Georgia
- Lille, France
- Lublin, Poland
- Maribor, Slovenia
- Nuremberg, Germany
- Polis, Cyprus
- Poznań, Poland
- Rishon LeZion, Israel
- Tianjin, China
- Tirana, Albania
- Trnava, Slovakia
- Varna, Bulgaria

Kherson

- Bizerte, Tunisia
- İzmit, Turkey
- Mersin, Turkey
- Rzeszów, Poland
- Shumen, Bulgaria
- Zalaegerszeg, Hungary
- Zonguldak, Turkey

Khmelnytskyi

- Bălți, Moldova
- Bor, Serbia
- Ciechanów, Poland
- Kramfors, Sweden
- Manises, Spain
- Modesto, United States
- Prague 6 (Prague), Czech Republic
- Sheffield, England, United Kingdom
- Šiauliai, Lithuania
- Silistra, Bulgaria
- Starobilsk, Ukraine

Khmilnyk

- Bagnoles-de-l'Orne-Normandie, France
- Bierawa, Poland
- Busko-Zdrój, Poland
- Cupcini, Moldova
- Krynica-Zdrój, Poland
- Myrhorod, Ukraine
- Szczawnica, Poland
- Tarnów County, Poland
- Uman, Ukraine
- Zviahel, Ukraine

Khodoriv

- Ratne, Ukraine
- Strawczyn, Poland

Khust

- Komárom, Hungary
- Lesko, Poland
- Lipany, Slovakia
- Nyírbátor, Hungary
- Sighetu Marmației, Romania
- Snina, Slovakia
- Szirmabesenyő, Hungary
- Žďár nad Sázavou, Czech Republic

Kobeliaky

- Singen, Germany

Kolomyia

- Drochia, Moldova
- Gniewino, Poland
- Kratovo, North Macedonia
- Łapsze Niżne, Poland
- Łomża, Poland
- Nysa, Poland
- Sighetu Marmației, Romania

Konotop

- Krasnohorivka, Ukraine
- Mezdra, Bulgaria
- Plungė, Lithuania
- Rzeszów, Poland
- Stargard, Poland

Korosten

- Anenii Noi, Moldova
- Kraśnik, Poland
- Malvern, England, United Kingdom
- Slobozhanske, Ukraine
- Sloviansk, Ukraine
- Svitlovodsk, Ukraine
- Ukmergė, Lithuania
- Volodymyr, Ukraine
- Wabash, United States

Korsun-Shevchenkivskyi

- Chojnice, Poland
- Gifhorn, Germany

Kostopil

- Dobre Miasto, Poland
- Janów Lubelski, Poland
- Lubomino, Poland

Kovel

- Baboszewo, Poland
- Barsinghausen, Germany
- Brzeg Dolny, Poland
- Bucha, Ukraine
- Chamblee, United States
- Chełm, Poland
- Łęczna, Poland
- Legionowo, Poland
- Nikolske, Ukraine
- Pinsk, Belarus
- Smila, Ukraine
- Szczuczyn, Poland
- Utena, Lithuania
- Walsrode, Germany

Kramatorsk

- Stamford, United States

Kremenchuk

- Alytus, Lithuania
- Berdiansk, Ukraine
- Bila Tserkva, Ukraine
- Bydgoszcz, Poland
- Jiayuguan, China
- Sidoarjo, Indonesia
- Svishtov, Bulgaria

Kryvyi Rih

- Lublin, Poland
- (Georgia (country)) Rustavi, Georgia

Kyiv

- Ankara, Turkey
- Ashgabat, Turkmenistan
- Astana, Kazakhstan
- Athens, Greece
- Baku, Azerbaijan
- Beijing, China
- Berlin, Germany
- Bishkek, Kyrgyzstan
- Brasília, Brazil
- Bratislava, Slovakia
- Brussels, Belgium
- Buenos Aires, Argentina
- Chicago, United States
- Chișinău, Moldova
- Copenhagen, Denmark
- (Republic of Ireland) Dublin, Ireland
- Edinburgh, Scotland, United Kingdom
- Florence, Italy
- Havana, Cuba
- Jakarta, Indonesia
- Kraków, Poland
- Kyoto, Japan
- Leipzig, Germany
- Lima, Peru
- Marseille, France
- Mexico City, Mexico
- Munich, Germany
- Odense, Denmark
- Osh Region, Kyrgyzstan
- Pretoria, South Africa
- Riga, Latvia
- Rio de Janeiro, Brazil
- Santiago, Chile
- Sofia, Bulgaria
- Tallinn, Estonia
- Tampere, Finland
- Tashkent, Uzbekistan
- (Georgia (country)) Tbilisi, Georgia
- Toulouse, France
- Vilnius, Lithuania
- Warsaw, Poland
- Wrocław, Poland
- Wuhan, China

== L ==
Luhansk

- Cardiff, Wales, United Kingdom
- Lublin, Poland
- Pernik, Bulgaria
- Saint-Étienne, France
- Székesfehérvár, Hungary
- Yalta, Ukraine

Lutsk

- Białystok, Poland
- Chełm, Poland
- Kaunas, Lithuania
- Kent, United States
- Kyjov, Czech Republic
- Lippe (district), Germany
- Lublin, Poland
- Olsztyn, Poland
- Rzeszów, Poland
- Schweinfurt, Germany
- Toruń, Poland
- Trakai, Lithuania
- Xiangtan, China
- Zamość, Poland

Lviv

- Banja Luka, Bosnia and Herzegovina
- Brno, Czech Republic
- Corning, United States
- Freiburg im Breisgau, Germany
- Kraków, Poland
- Katowice, Poland
- (Georgia (country)) Kutaisi, Georgia
- Łódź, Poland
- Lublin, Poland
- Mechelen, Belgium
- Plovdiv, Bulgaria
- Przemyśl, Poland
- Pula, Croatia
- Reykjavík, Iceland
- Rochdale, England, United Kingdom
- Rzeszów, Poland
- Winnipeg, Canada
- Wrocław, Poland

== M ==
Makariv

- Popovo, Bulgaria

Mariupol

- Akmenė, Lithuania
- Kalymnos, Greece
- Pereiaslav, Ukraine
- Qiqihar, China
- Savona, Italy

Melitopol

- Barysaw, Belarus
- Brive-la-Gaillarde, France
- (Georgia (country)) Gori, Georgia
- Kėdainiai, Lithuania
- Puchavičy District, Belarus
- Sliven, Bulgaria

Mohyliv-Podilskyi

- Bălți, Moldova
- Cavriglia, Italy
- Końskie, Poland
- Šaľa, Slovakia
- Środa Wielkopolska, Poland

Mukachevo

- Budavár (Budapest), Hungary
- Celldömölk, Hungary
- Dabas, Hungary
- Eger, Hungary
- Humenné, Slovakia
- Kisvárda, Hungary
- Mátészalka, Hungary
- Nyírmeggyes, Hungary
- Mielec, Poland
- Pag, Croatia
- Pelhřimov, Czech Republic
- Prešov, Slovakia
- Senta, Serbia

Mykolaiv

- Aalborg, Denmark
- Braslaw, Belarus
- Chełm, Poland
- Dezhou, China
- Galați, Romania
- Glasgow, Scotland, United Kingdom
- Kotka, Finland
- (Georgia (country)) Kutaisi, Georgia
- Nilüfer, Turkey
- Pleven, Bulgaria
- Tinos, Greece
- Trieste, Italy
- Zhoushan, China

Myrhorod

- Anykščiai, Lithuania
- Barby, Germany
- Gorna Oryahovitsa, Bulgaria
- Jēkabpils, Latvia
- Khmilnyk, Ukraine
- Maardu, Estonia
- (Georgia (country)) Mtskheta, Georgia
- Obukhiv, Ukraine
- Rechytsa, Belarus
- Smalyavichy, Belarus
- Zgorzelec, Poland
- Zviahel, Ukraine

== N ==
Nadvirna

- Krnov, Czech Republic
- Prudnik, Poland
- Șomcuta Mare, Romania

Nikopol

- Halmstad, Sweden
- Leverkusen, Germany
- Lloydminster, Canada
- Perth, Scotland

Nizhyn

- Ioannina, Greece
- Preiļi, Latvia
- Świdnica, Poland
- Winchester, England, United Kingdom

Novovolynsk

- Biłgoraj, Poland
- Bílina, Czech Republic
- Hrubieszów County, Poland
- Jaraczewo, Poland
- Kelmė, Lithuania
- Otwock County, Poland
- Rymanów, Poland
- Stropkov, Slovakia

== O ==
Obukhiv

- Będzin, Poland
- Kaišiadorys, Lithuania
- Grosuplje, Slovenia
- (Georgia (country)) Khashuri, Georgia
- Myrhorod, Ukraine
- Radebeul, Germany
- Stryi, Ukraine

Odesa

- Alexandria, Egypt
- Baltimore, United States
- Chișinău, Moldova
- Constanţa, Romania
- Genoa, Italy
- Haifa, Israel
- Heidelberg, Germany
- Istanbul, Turkey
- Kolkata, India
- Liverpool, England, United Kingdom
- Łódź, Poland
- Mainz, Germany
- Marseille, France
- Nicosia, Cyprus
- Nova Odessa, Brazil
- Oulu, Finland
- Piraeus, Greece
- Qingdao, China
- Regensburg, Germany
- Split, Croatia
- Szeged, Hungary
- Taita–Taveta County, Kenya
- Vancouver, Canada
- Varna, Bulgaria
- Yerevan, Armenia
- Yokohama, Japan

Oleksandriia

- Jarocin, Poland
- Tervel, Bulgaria
- Xinyi, China

Ostroh

- Athens, United States
- Beaufort, United States
- Bieruń, Poland
- Moravský Beroun, Czech Republic
- Sandomierz, Poland

Ovruch

- Baranivka, Ukraine
- Choszczno, Poland
- Vincennes, United States

== P ==
Pavlohrad

- (Georgia (country)) Gori, Georgia
- Lubsko, Poland

Perechyn

- Drienica, Slovakia
- Głogów Małopolski, Poland
- Humenné, Slovakia
- Koromľa, Slovakia
- Kriva Palanka, North Macedonia
- Leżajsk (rural gmina), Poland
- Nagyecsed, Hungary
- Ruski Krstur (Kula), Serbia
- Sobrance, Slovakia
- Spišské Podhradie, Slovakia
- Svitavy, Czech Republic

Pereiaslav

- Kočani, North Macedonia
- Mariupol, Ukraine
- (Georgia (country)) Mtskheta, Georgia
- Paide, Estonia

Peremyshliany

- Łosice, Poland
- Skawina, Poland

Pidhaitsi

- Strzegom, Poland

Pivdenne

- Dimitrovgrad, Bulgaria
- Kavarna, Bulgaria
- Kemer, Turkey
- (Georgia (country)) Kobuleti, Georgia
- Körmend, Hungary
- Yueqing, China

Pivdennoukrainsk

- Bełchatów, Poland

Poltava

- Baranavichy, Belarus
- (Georgia (country)) Borjomi, Georgia
- Dongying, China
- Filderstadt, Germany
- Flint, United States
- Irondequoit, United States
- Kouvola, Finland
- Leinfelden-Echterdingen, Germany
- Ostfildern, Germany
- Qinhuai (Nanjing), China

== R ==
Radomyshl

- Radomyśl Wielki, Poland

Rakhiv

- Belváros-Lipótváros (Budapest), Hungary
- Bielsk Podlaski, Poland
- Deszk, Hungary
- Poienile de sub Munte, Romania
- Svidník, Slovakia
- Szeged, Hungary
- Třebíč, Czech Republic

Rivne

- Fredrikstad, Norway
- (Georgia (country)) Kobuleti, Georgia
- Jelenia Góra, Poland
- Lublin, Poland
- Lund, Sweden
- Olsztyn, Poland
- Pankow (Berlin), Germany
- Piotrków Trybunalski, Poland
- Radomsko County, Poland
- Sievierodonetsk, Ukraine
- Vidin, Bulgaria
- Zabrze, Poland
- Zvolen, Slovakia

Rubizhne

- Dolyna, Ukraine

== S ==
Saky

- Aleksin, Russia
- Centralny (Gomel), Belarus
- Fethiye, Turkey
- Livny, Russia
- Qionghai, China
- Shchigry, Russia
- Sudak, Ukraine
- Vadul lui Vodă, Moldova
- Yessentuki, Russia

Sarny

- Długołęka, Poland
- Nowy Dwór Gdański, Poland

Shchyrets

- Bełżyce, Poland
- Gudensberg, Germany
- Jelcz-Laskowice, Poland
- Kamienna Góra, Poland

Shepetivka

- Łowicz, Poland

Sheptytskyi

- Brandon, Canada
- Pyskowice, Poland

Shostka

- Akmenė, Lithuania
- Oryahovo, Bulgaria
- Słubice, Poland
- Świdnik, Poland

Shumsk

- Kobyłka, Poland
- Mszczonów, Poland

Simferopol

- Alexandroupoli, Greece
- Heidelberg, Germany

Skadovsk

- Novopolotsk, Belarus
- Šilutė, Lithuania
- Zolochiv, Ukraine

Slavutych

- Aizkraukle, Latvia
- Kalinkavichy, Belarus
- Visaginas, Lithuania

Smila

- Irpin, Ukraine
- Jonava, Lithuania
- Kovel, Ukraine
- Newton, United States
- Vadul lui Vodă, Moldova

Sniatyn

- Koniecpol, Poland
- Krasnohorivka, Ukraine

Stryi

- Bălți, Moldova
- Düren, Germany
- Gradačac, Bosnia and Herzegovina
- Lwówek County, Poland
- Mansfield, England, United Kingdom
- Nowy Sącz, Poland
- Stryi, Ukraine
- Vegreville, Canada
- Zakopane, Poland

Sudak

- Beryozovsky, Russia
- Dolinsk, Russia
- Kotelniki, Russia
- Kyivskyi (Donetsk), Ukraine
- Perovo (Moscow), Russia
- Saky, Ukraine
- Volokolamsk, Russia

Sumy

- Celle, Germany
- Gorzów Wielkopolski, Poland
- Hämeenlinna, Finland
- (Georgia (country)) Kutaisi, Georgia
- Lublin, Poland
- Sacramento, United States
- Vratsa, Bulgaria
- Zhuji, China

== T ==
Ternopil

- (Georgia (country)) Batumi, Georgia
- Chorzów, Poland
- Elbląg, Poland
- Jelenia Góra, Poland
- Nysa, Poland
- Pinsk, Belarus
- Płońsk, Poland
- Prudentópolis, Brazil
- Sliven, Bulgaria
- Sulęcin County, Poland
- Tauragė, Lithuania
- Tiraspol, Moldova
- Viljandi, Estonia

Tetiiv

- Żory, Poland

Tiachiv

- Baktalórántháza, Hungary
- Balmazújváros, Hungary
- Bardejov, Slovakia
- Bucha, Ukraine
- Chotěboř, Czech Republic
- Jablunkov, Czech Republic
- Jászberény, Hungary
- Mladá Boleslav, Czech Republic
- Náchod, Czech Republic
- Nagykálló, Hungary
- Negrești-Oaș, Romania
- Pestszentlőrinc-Pestszentimre (Budapest), Hungary
- Spišská Nová Ves, Slovakia
- Tuszyn, Poland
- Vác, Hungary

Truskavets

- Annopol, Poland
- Dolný Kubín, Slovakia
- Działdowo, Poland
- Jasło, Poland
- Limanowa, Poland
- Przemyśl, Poland
- Rzeszów, Poland
- Sanok, Poland
- Sloviansk, Ukraine
- (Georgia (country)) Tsqaltubo, Georgia
- Uniejów, Poland
- Wathlingen, Germany
- Zaklików, Poland

== U ==
Uman

- Ashkelon, Israel
- Căușeni, Moldova
- Davis, United States
- Gniezno, Poland
- Haapsalu, Estonia
- Khmilnyk, Ukraine
- Koblenz, Germany
- Kórnik, Poland
- Łańcut, Poland
- Milford Haven, Wales, United Kingdom
- Nof HaGalil, Israel
- Radviliškis, Lithuania
- Romilly-sur-Seine, France
- Safed, Israel

Uzhhorod

- Békéscsaba, Hungary
- Brno, Czech Republic
- Česká Lípa, Czech Republic
- Corvallis, United States
- Darmstadt, Germany
- Jarosław, Poland
- Jihlava, Czech Republic
- Košice, Slovakia
- Krosno, Poland
- Michalovce, Slovakia
- Nyíregyháza, Hungary
- Óbuda-Békásmegyer (Budapest), Hungary
- Požega, Croatia
- Pula, Croatia
- Szombathely, Hungary
- Trogir, Croatia
- Ulcinj, Montenegro
- Xinzhou, China

== V ==
Vinnytsia

- Bat Yam, Israel
- Birmingham, United States
- Bursa, Turkey
- Karlsruhe, Germany
- Kielce, Poland
- Nancy, France
- Panevėžys, Lithuania
- Peterborough, England, United Kingdom
- Ventspils, Latvia

Volodymyr

- Hrubieszów, Poland
- Kętrzyn, Poland
- Korosten, Ukraine
- Łęczyca, Poland
- Zwickau, Germany

Vynnyky

- Grudziądz, Poland
- (Georgia (country)) Gurjaani, Georgia
- Milovice, Czech Republic
- Poręba, Poland
- Radzyń Chełmiński, Poland
- Trzebnica, Poland

Vynohradiv

- Dynów, Poland
- Nyírbátor, Hungary
- Vranov nad Topľou, Slovakia

Vyshhorod

- Delčevo, North Macedonia
- Eichenau, Germany
- Kaniv, Ukraine
- Lörrach, Germany
- Rakvere, Estonia
- Sens, France
- Wyszków, Poland

== Y ==
Yalta

- Antalya, Turkey
- Baden-Baden, Germany
- Eilat, Israel
- Grozny, Russia
- Kaluga, Russia
- Khachmaz, Azerbaijan
- Latakia, Syria
- Luhansk, Ukraine
- Margate, England, United Kingdom
- Nice, France
- Pozzuoli, Italy
- Rhodes, Greece
- Salsomaggiore Terme, Italy
- Sanya, China
- Sharm El Sheikh, Egypt
- Ulan-Ude, Russia
- Vladikavkaz, Russia

Yampil

- Soroca, Moldova
- Syców, Poland

Yaremche

- Namysłów, Poland

Yavoriv

- Jarosław, Poland
- Lubaczów, Poland
- Węgorzewo, Poland

Yevpatoria

- Aleksin, Russia
- Belgorod, Russia
- Figueira da Foz, Portugal
- Ioannina, Greece
- Krasnogorsky District, Russia
- Ludwigsburg, Germany
- Nizhny Tagil, Russia
- Vologda, Russia
- Zakynthos, Greece

== Z ==
Zaporizhzhia

- Ashdod, Israel
- Belfort, France
- Birmingham, England, United Kingdom
- Lahti, Finland
- Linz, Austria
- Magdeburg, Germany
- Oberhausen, Germany
- Stienbach, Canada
- Yichang, China

Zavodske

- Krzeszów, Poland

Zhmerynka

- Sędziszów Małopolski, Poland
- Skarżysko-Kamienna, Poland

Zhovkva

- Cieszanów, Poland
- Horyniec-Zdrój, Poland
- Łaszczów, Poland
- Łęczna County, Poland
- Ludwin, Poland
- Mełgiew, Poland
- Piaski, Poland
- Rybczewice, Poland
- Spiczyn, Poland
- Wólka, Poland
- Zamość, Poland
- Żółkiewka, Poland

Zhytomyr

- Bytom, Poland
- Dortmund, Germany
- Gdynia, Poland
- (Georgia (country)) Kutaisi, Georgia
- Montana, Bulgaria
- Pardubice, Czech Republic
- Płock, Poland
- Shangla, Pakistan
- Vicenza, Italy

Zolochiv

- Oława, Poland
- Schöningen, Germany
- Skadovsk, Ukraine

Zviahel

- Bełchatów, Poland
- Dolyna, Ukraine
- Halych, Ukraine
- (Georgia (country)) Khashuri, Georgia
- Khmilnyk, Ukraine
- Łomża, Poland
- Ludwigshafen am Rhein, Germany
- Myrhorod, Ukraine
- Rahachow, Belarus
- Šalčininkai, Lithuania
- Suomussalmi, Finland
