= August Schwendenwein von Lanauberg =

Austrian architect

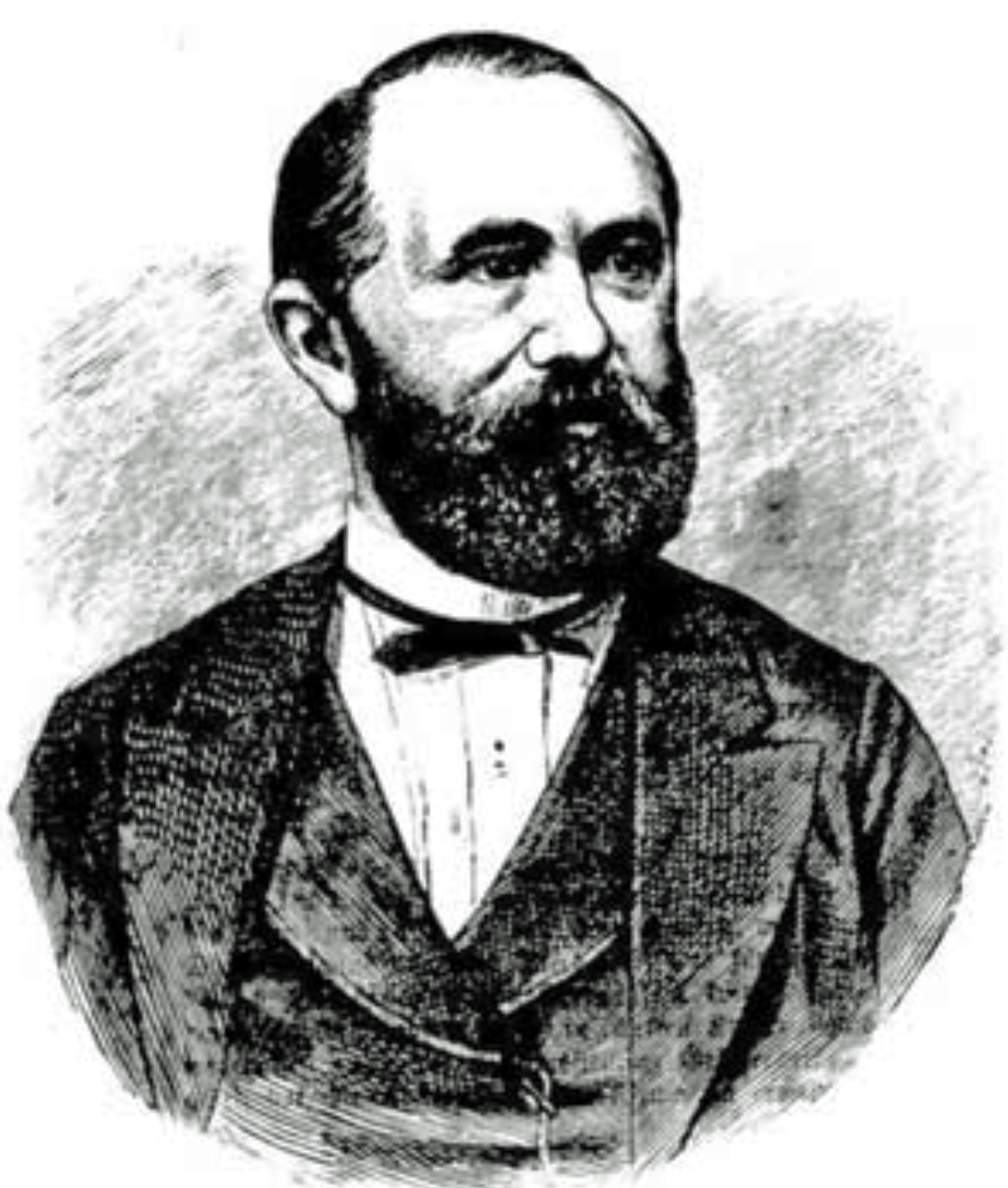
August Schwendenwein

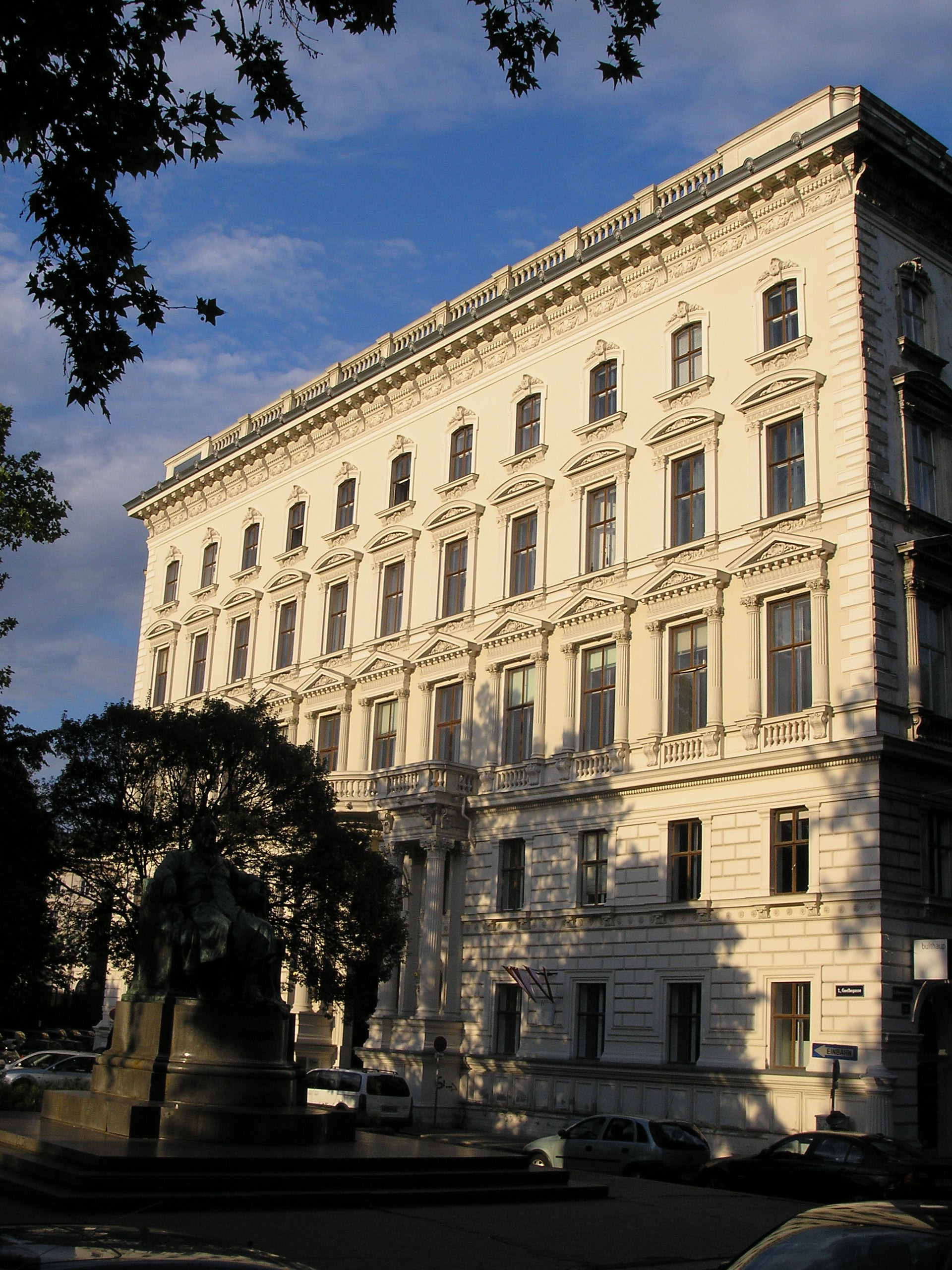
The Palais Schey von Koromla

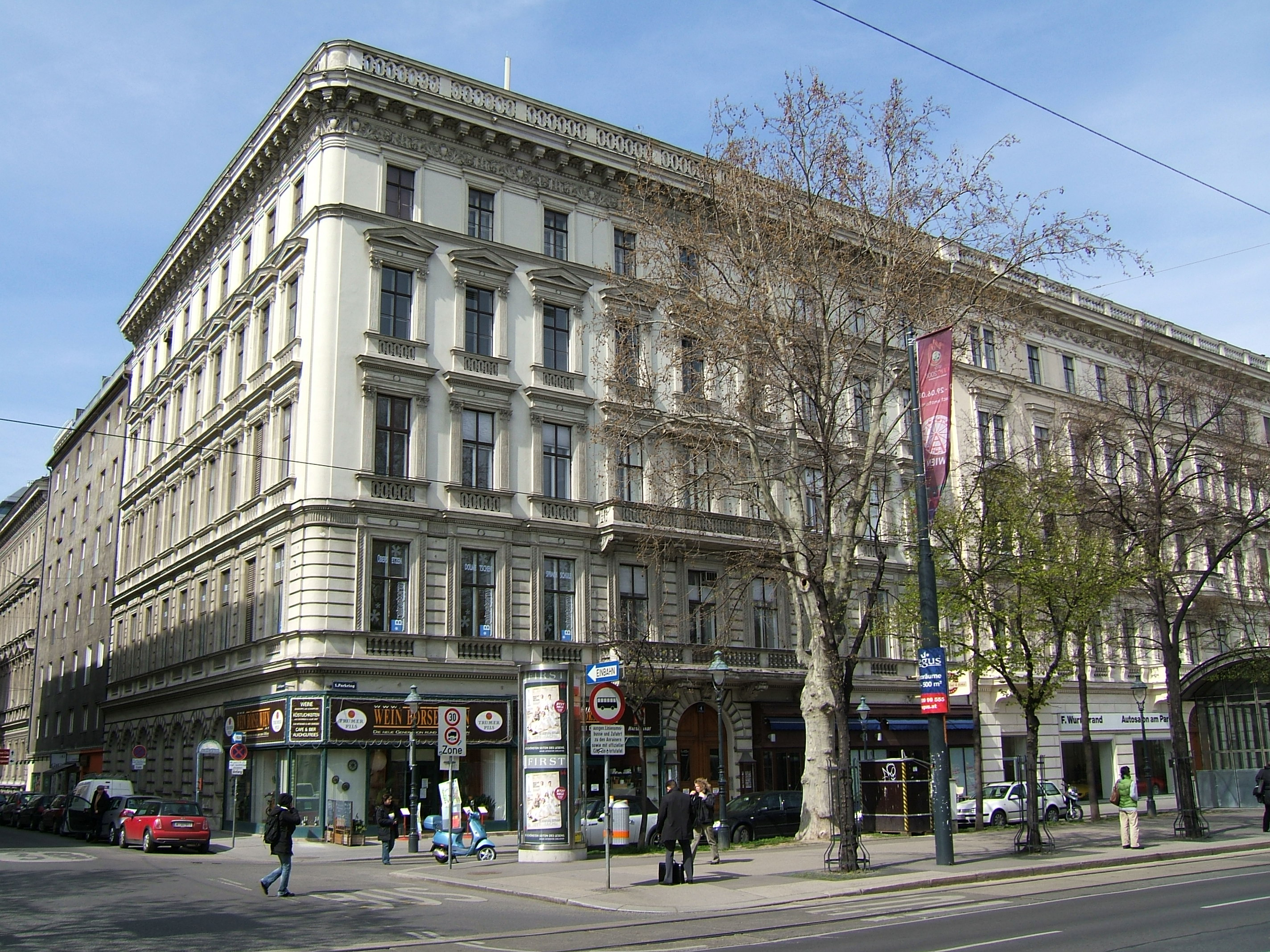
Palais Dumba

August Schwendenwein von Lanauberg (1 December 1817, Vienna - 3 November 1885, Vienna) was an Austrian architect who built several Viennese palaces.

== Life and works ==
He came from a poor family, that worked hard to put him through school. From 1833 to 1836, he studied at the k.k. Polytechnisches Institut (now part of the Technical University of Vienna) then, from 1836 to 1840, at the Academy of Fine Arts. He was awarded the academy's Gundel-Prize for excellence in 1837. After graduating, a scholarship enabled him to continue his studies in Munich and take several study trips.

From the 1840s, he worked closely with Johann Romano von Ringe, a childhood friend and fellow student. Their firm became prominent in the field of rental and commercial buildings, but they specialized in upper-class residential architecture. Romano was essentially the company's salesman, so he became familiar throughout Viennese society, whereas Schwendenwein was largely unknown, although the designs were predominantly his. Most of their buildings are in Vienna, but they worked throughout the Austro-Hungarian Empire.

From 1866, he was a member of the academy and, in 1870, was awarded the Order of the Iron Crown, which conferred a title of nobility. In 1876, he joined the Vienna Künstlerhaus.

When his wife died in an accident in 1872, he withdrew from the construction business, but continued to participate on committees, commissions, and other official bodies. He used much of his fortune to support charitable causes.

A street in Vienna's Währing district was named after him in 1894.

Among his most notable works are the Palais Schey von Koromla (1864) on the Ringstrasse, built for the banker, Friedrich Schey von Koromla; the Palais Dumba (1866), built for the industrialist, Nikolaus Dumba; and the Palais Henckel von Donnersmarck (1871), which is now a Radisson Blu hotel.

== Sources ==
- Constantin von Wurzbach: "Schwendenwein von Lanauberg, August." In: Biographisches Lexikon des Kaiserthums Oesterreich (Biographical Lexicon of the Empire of Austria). Part 32 Kaiserlich-königliche Hof- und Staatsdruckerei, Vienna 1876, p. 372–374 (digitalised).
- Karl Weiß (1891). "Schwendenwein von Lanauberg, August" . Allgemeine Deutsche Biographie (in German). Vol. 33. Leipzig: Duncker & Humblot. pp. 381–382.
- "Schwendenwein von Lanauberg August". In: Österreichisches Biographisches Lexikon 1815–1950 (ÖBL). Vol. 12, Austrian Academy of Sciences, Vienna 2005, ISBN 3-7001-3580-7, p. 46 f. (Direct links to "p. 46", "p. 47")
