= Felix Ehrenhaft =

Austrian physicist (1879-1952)

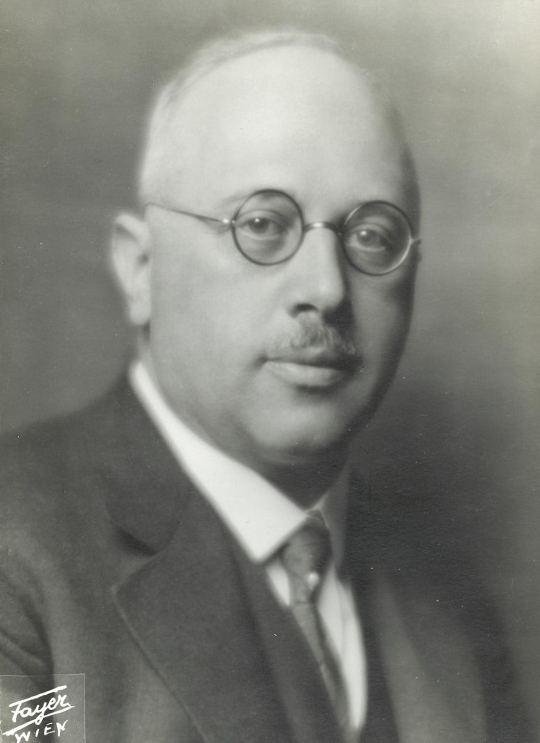
- Felix Ehrenhaft
- Born: 24 April 1879; Vienna, Austria-Hungary
- Died: 4 March 1952 (aged 72); Vienna, Allied-occupied Austria
- Education: University of Vienna (PhD, 1903)
- Spouse: Olga Ehrenhaft-Steindler
- Awards: Lieben Prize 1910; Haitinger Prize 1917
- Scientific career
- Fields: Theoretical physics
- Workplaces: University of Vienna
- Doctoral advisor: Franz-Serafin Exner
- Doctoral students: Georg Stetter; Walter Thirring

Felix Ehrenhaft (24 April 1879 – 4 March 1952) was an Austrian physicist who contributed to atomic physics, to the measurement of electrical charges and to the optical properties of metal colloids. He was known for his maverick and controversial style. His iconoclasm was greatly admired by philosopher Paul Feyerabend. He won the Haitinger Prize of the Austrian Academy of Sciences in 1917.

== Biography ==
=== Early years ===
Ehrenhaft was born in Vienna to physician Leopold Ehrenhaft and Louise Eggar, the daughter of a Hungarian industrialist. Ehrenhaft earned his doctorate from the University of Vienna in 1903, working on the optical properties of metallic colloids. He subsequently became assistant to Franz S. Exner.

=== Middle years ===
In 1907, the reality of atoms was still disputed, but Albert Einstein and Marian Smoluchowski had both recently given accounts of Brownian motion in liquids, strongly supporting the atomic theory. Though Theodor Svedberg had made important demonstrations of Brownian motion in colloids, Ehrenhaft extended the work to make observations of particles of silver in air. The greater mean free path of air made for a sterner test of the reality of atoms. Ehrenhaft was awarded the Lieben Prize of the Vienna Academy of Sciences for his work.

In 1908, he married physicist Olga Steindler. They had two children, Johannes Leopold Friedrich, born on 10 October 1915, and Anna Maria Luise, born 19 February 1917. Both emigrated to the United States in the 1930s.

Ehrenhaft adapted his apparatus to measure the elementary charge and subsequently became involved in a bitter controversy with Robert Millikan, claiming to have measured an electric charge less than that of a single electron, Millikan being passed over for the 1920 Nobel Prize in physics owing to the unresolved nature of the debate. Controversy eventually subsided as more and more physicists were swayed by Millikan's results, but even as late as 1940, Albert Einstein wrote:

Concerning his results about the elementary charge I do not believe in his [Ehrenhaft's] numerical results, but I believe that nobody has a clear idea about the causes producing the apparent sub-electronic charges he found in careful investigations.

Even while controversy raged over sub-electronic charges, Ehrenhaft made important and substantial contributions to physics including the demonstration of photophoresis and other effects on the interaction of particles with light. Some of these effects have subsequently been explained in terms of existing phenomena, but some still remain poorly understood. He became professor of experimental physics at Vienna in 1920 and was known as a conscientious researcher and effective lecturer, though single-minded to the point of absurdity. Albert Einstein was a frequent visitor to his home. Following the Anschluss in 1938, Ehrenhaft emigrated, first to England, then to the U.S., where he became a citizen.

=== Later years ===
From the mid-1930s, Ehrenhaft's thinking started to diverge strikingly from the mainstream of physics. He observed many genuinely surprising and reproducible physical phenomena, usually of ultra-microscopic particles near the limits of perception. However, he was all too willing to adopt alternate theories to explain experiments that were beset with interactions and multifactorial cause systems.

From the 1940s, Ehrenhaft's views became increasingly extreme and strident, eventually terminating his good friendship with Albert Einstein. He found it impossible to obtain either research funding or even a sympathetic hearing in the U.S. In 1946, he returned to the University of Vienna where he held his old position again until his death. He became increasingly certain that he had observed magnetic monopoles, magnetic currents and magnetolysis, the dissociation of liquids by magnets rather than electric current as in electrolysis.

A review of his life's work can be found in the Austrian scientific journal "Acta physica Austriaca" and in the article by Rohatschek on photophoresis (see sources below).

== Publications ==
- Ehrenhaft, Felix: Das optische Verhalten der Metallkolloide und deren Teilchengröße, 1903.
- Ehrenhaft, Felix: "Über die Messung von Elektrizitätsmengen, die kleiner zu sein scheinen als die Ladung des einwertigen Wasserstoffions oder Elektrons und von dessen Vielfachen abweichen", Kais. Akad. Wiss. Wien, Sitzber. math.-nat. Kl. 119 (IIa) 815–867, 1910
- Ehrenhaft, Felix: Das mikromagnetische Feld, 1926.
- Ehrenhaft, Felix: "Die longitudinale und transversale Elektro- und Magnetophorese", Phys. Zeit. 31, 478–485, 1930
- Ehrenhaft, Felix: "Photophoresis and the Influence upon it of Electric and Magnetic fields", Phil. mag. 11 (1931),140–146
- Ehrenhaft, Felix: "Physical and Astronomical information Concerning Particles of the Order of Magnitude of the Wavelength of Light", Journal of the Franklin Institute, vol 230: 381–393 (Sept. 1940)
- Ehrenhaft, Felix and Banet, Leo: "Is there a true magnetism or not", Phil. sci. 8 (1941), 458–462
- Ehrenhaft, Felix: "Stationary Electric and Magnetic Fields in Beams of Light", Nature 147: 25 (Jan. 4, 1941).
- Ehrenhaft, Felix: "Photophoresis and Its Interpretation by Electric and Magnetic Ions", Journal of the Franklin Institute, vol 233 (March 1942), pp. 235–255.
- Ehrenhaft, Felix: "The Magnetic Current", Science 94: 232–233 (Sept 5, 1941).
- Ehrenhaft, Felix and Banet, Leo: "The Magnetic Ion", Science 96: 228–229 (Sept. 4, 1942).
- Ehrenhaft, Felix: "The Magnetic Current in Gases", Physical Review 61: 733 (1942).
- Ehrenhaft, Felix: "Decomposition of Matter Through the Magnet (Magnetolysis)", Physical Review 63: 216 (1943).
- Ehrenhaft, Felix: "Magnetolysis and the Electric Field Around the Magnetic Current", Physical Review 63: 461-462 (1943).
- Ehrenhaft, Felix: "Further Facts Concerning the magnetic Current", Physical Review 64: 43 (1943).
- Ehrenhaft, Felix: "New Experiments about the Magnetic Current", Physical Review 65: 62–63 (1944).
- Ehrenhaft, Felix: "Continuation of Experiments with the Magnetic Current", Physical Review 65: 256 (1944).
- Ehrenhaft, Felix: "The Decomposition of Water by the So-Called Permanent Magnet...", Physical Review 65: 287–289 (May 1944).
- Ehrenhaft, Felix: "The Magnetic Current", Nature 154: 426–427 (Sept. 30, 1944)
- Ehrenhaft, Felix: "On Photophoresis, the true magnetic Charge and on helical Motion of Matter in Fields" (Review of his scientific work part 1, in German), Acta Physica Austriaca 4: 461–488 (1951).
- Ehrenhaft, Felix: "On Photophoresis, the true magnetic Charge and on helical Motion of Matter in Fields" (Review of his scientific work part 2, in German), Acta Physica Austriaca 5: 12–29 (1952).

== See also ==
- Paul Feyerabend
- Viktor Schauberger
- List of physicists
- Nobel Prize controversies
