= Vienna Business School =

Vienna Business School is a private educational institution in Austria with a focus on business and economics, operated in Vienna and Mödling by the Fonds der Wiener Kaufmannschaft (Viennese Merchants Guild).

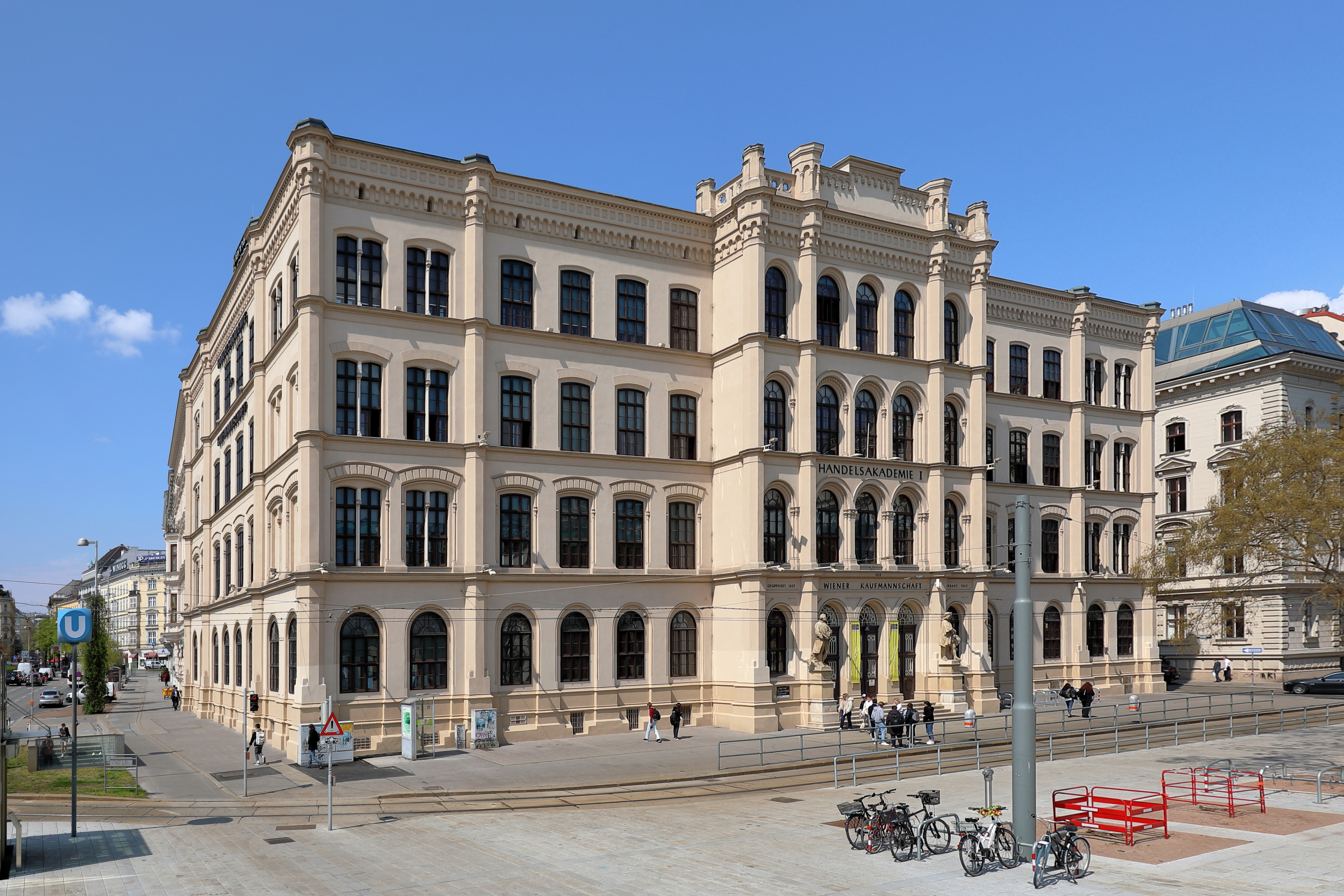
HAK I Akademiestraße

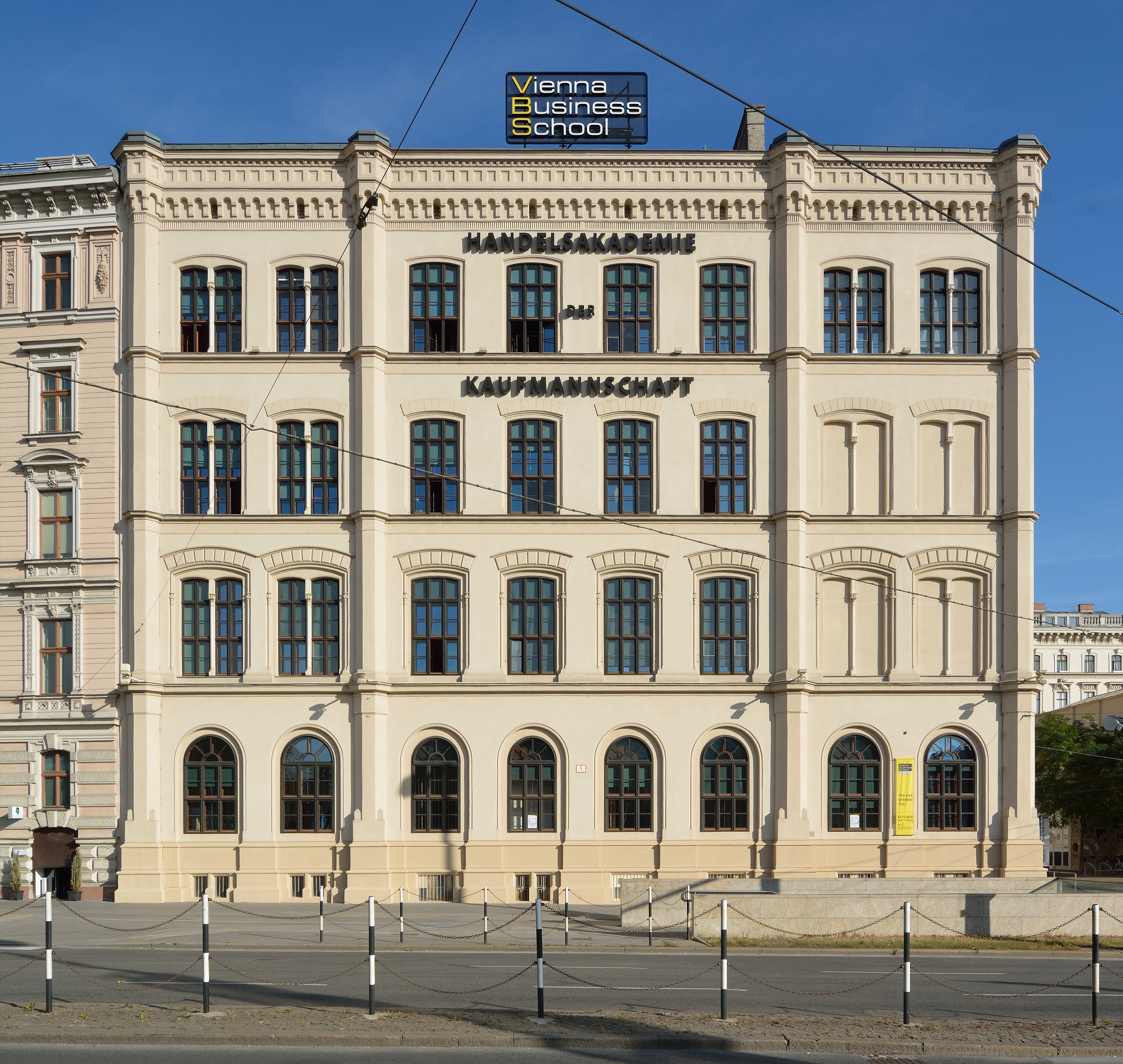
HAK I, view from Karlsplatz

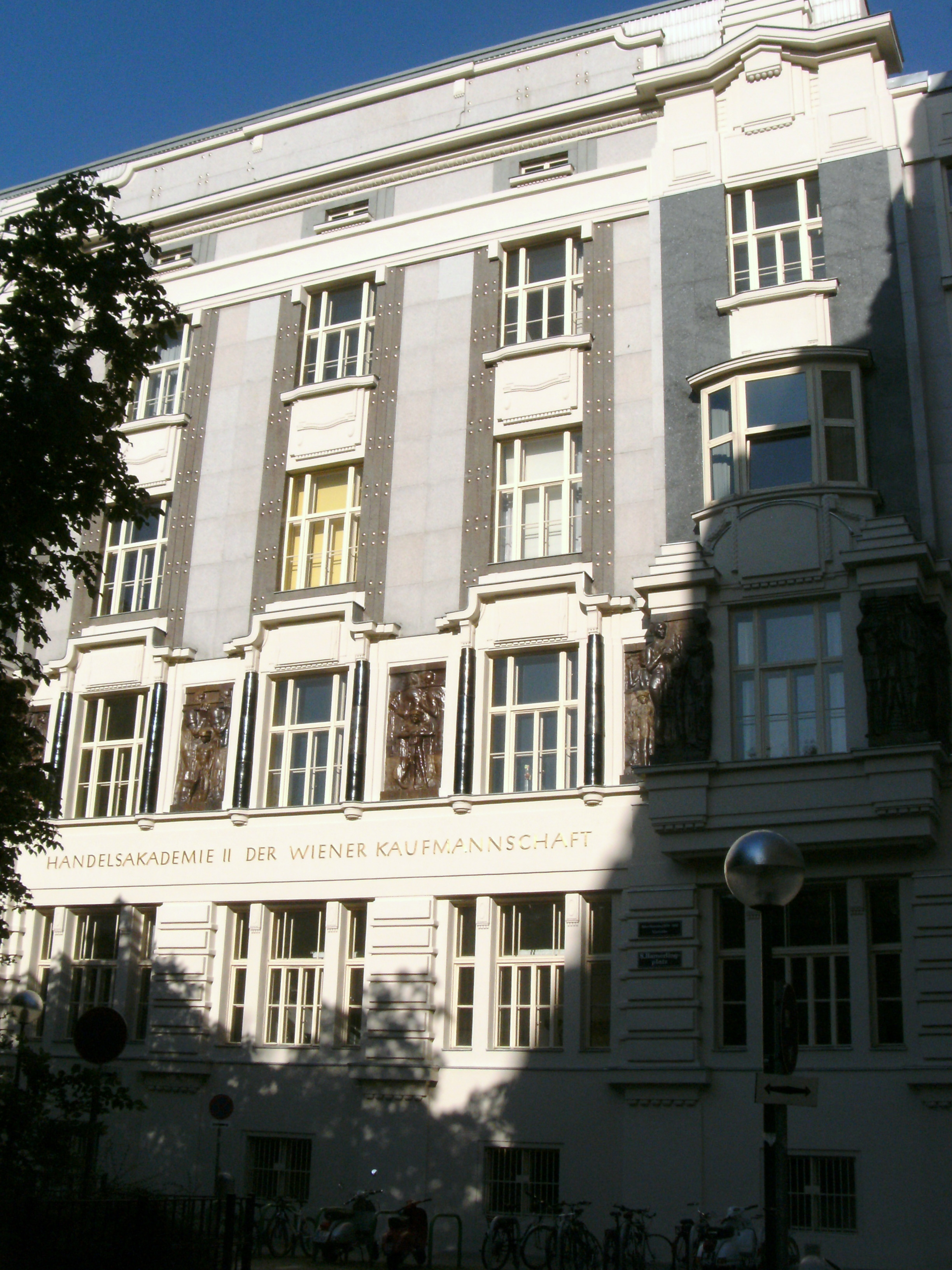
HAK II Hamerlingplatz

== Overview ==
The Fonds der Wiener Kaufmannschaft operates six commercial academies (Handelsakademien) and six commercial schools (Handelsschulen) in Vienna and Mödling. In addition, commercial colleges, consolidation courses as well as courses at the University of Applied Sciences of the Wiener Wirtschaft, are offered in cooperation with the Wirtschaftskammer Wien (Vienna Commercial Chamber). According to the statute of the Fonds der Wiener Kaufmannschaft, these institutions have the explicit aim to educate commercially competent young talent for the Wiener Wirtschaft.

Educational institutions and courses operated by the Vienna Business School:

- HAK/HAK I Akademiestraße
- HAK II/HAS III Hamerlingplatz
- HAK III/HAS IV Schönborngasse
- HAK/HAS Augarten
- HAK/HAS Floridsdorf
- HAK/HAS Mödling
- Kolleg für Kunstmanagement
- Kaufmännisches Kolleg – Städtetourismus & Eventmanagement
- HAK Plus – Schönborngasse & Mödling

== History ==
The Handelsakademie Wien was founded in 1857, the second Handelsakademie in the Austrian Empire after Prague, and instruction started in the following year with five teachers and 59 pupils. The first president of the Handelsakademie was Friedrich Schey von Koromla. The building of the Handelsakademie in the Akademiestraße near Karlsplatz was designed by the architect Ferdinand Fellner dem Älteren and completed in 1862.

The so-called Neue Wiener Handelsakademie (New Vienna Commercial Academy) was founded in 1905 by the Wiener Kaufmännischen Verein (Vienna Commercial Association). The school building was built in 1906 and 1907 in the Hamerlingplatz, designed by Julius and Wunibald Deininger. Also in 1907, the first Wiener Handelsakademie für Mädchen (Vienna Commercial Academy for Girls) was established in the Schönborngasse by the physicist Dr. Olga Ehrenhaft-Steindler. In the other Handelsakademien, girls were only taught in separate classes from 1921 onwards.

In the 1920s, the Wiener Handelsakademien were taken over by the Council of the Vienna Merchants, from 1940 until 1954 it was administered by the city of Vienna. After 1952, the Wiener Handelsakademien were introduced into the newly founded Fonds der Wiener Kaufmannschaft (Fonds of the Viennese Merchants). Since 1997, the Handelsakademien operate under the name "Vienna Business School."

== Education ==
Education at the Vienna Business School lasts five years, and ends with the Reife- und Diplomprüfung (Matura). Notebooks are used in all classes from year two onwards, two foreign languages are compulsory, a third foreign language can be chosen as an optional course. From the third year onwards, all students must choose an Ausbildungsschwerpunkt (key area of training) from the following options: Marketing und internationale Geschäftstätigkeit (Marketing and International Business), Controlling und Jahresabschluss (Controlling and Annual Financial Statements), Wirtschaftsinformatik und betriebliche Organisation (business IT and business organisation), Management-Praxis, and Multimedia und Webdesign. What distinguishes the Vienna Business Schools from most other Handelsakademien is its international outlook and focus on practical learning: all students must complete two year-long projects (years three and five), one of them being the Maturaprojekt (a-levels project) in the relevant Ausbildungsschwerpunkt. Furthermore, in the subject Übungsfirma (virtual enterprise), pupils 'work' in a virtual company for three hours a week, and take part in an international virtual trade fair. The academic rigour in the Handelsakademien means that dropout rates after the first year can be as high as 40 per cent. A selective admissions process and initiatives such as the 'learning club' have meant that dropout rates at the Vienna Business School usually range between 20 and 23 per cent.

The successful Vienna Business School model has also been exported elsewhere; for example, a Russian Delegation visited to familiarise itself with the Austrian education system, and the Vienna Business School in particular, and on a separate occasion the president of the Russian Chamber of Commerce visited the Vienna Business School in 2007.

The international outlook of the VBS model is further illustrated by the fact that the HAK Floridsdorf (Franklinstrasse) is a UNESCO school (one of 44 in Austria), and has partner schools in Denmark and Poland. Furthermore, there is an emphasis on familiarising students with the European Union, for example through Europatage (Europe days) or projects, as for example in the case of the HAK Floridsdorf.

Through the concept of HAK Plus, the Vienna Business School focuses particularly on exceptionally talented students, and enriches the existing HAK curriculum with additional skills, such as methodological, personal and social competences, as well as encouraging students to participate in extracurricular activities.

=== Reputation ===
Vienna Business Schools can often be found in top positions in Austrian school rankings. Vienna Business Schools also have top-ranks in Bundesländer (state-level) rankings.

The Vienna Business Schools have a particularly good reputation in so far as their education has a project oriented, interdisciplinary focus with an emphasis on personal development, as well as putting a premium on the use of modern technologies. Liz Hull, Head of Human Resources at PwC in Austria, states that "In our experience, those university graduates that have attended commercial academies are particularly client-focused, inquisitive and socially competent. In addition, they catch on in areas such as accounting a lot quicker than others".

Many prominent members of the Austrian political, cultural and business elite are among the alumni of the Vienna Business School. Among the most prominent former students is the former Bundespräsident (Federal President) of Austria, Heinz Fischer.

== Cooperation with business ==
The Vienna Business Schools has close links with major Austrian companies, such as the Raiffeisen Bank, BauMaxx (hypermarket chain), the Generali Group (insurance), and Uniqa, and multinationals such as Acer, Microsoft, Canon, and JVC. Businesses often hold 'career days' at the schools, and get involved with various projects.

== See also ==
- Vienna University of Economics and Business
