= Olga Ehrenhaft-Steindler =

Austrian physicist

- Born: Olga Steindler; 28 October 1879; Vienna, Austria-Hungary
- Died: 21 December 1933 (aged 54); Vienna, Austria
- Education: University of Vienna (PhD. 1903)
- Spouse: Felix Ehrenhaft
- Scientific career
- Fields: Physics
- Doctoral advisor: Franz Serafin Exner

Olga Ehrenhaft-Steindler (28 October 1879 – 21 December 1933) was an Austrian physicist and science teacher. In 1903, she became the first woman to earn a physics doctorate at the University of Vienna. She established the first Wiener Handelsakademie für Mädchen (Vienna Commercial Academy for Girls), as well as a grammar school for girls, in 1907.

== Biography ==
=== Early years ===
Olga Steindler was born in Vienna to lawyer Leopold Steindler and Caroline Steindler, née Goldberg. She had three siblings. As women could not take the Matura (comparable to A-Level exams) in Vienna at the time, Olga Steindler went to Prague, where she took her exam on 7 July 1899.

Steindler began to study mathematics and physics at Vienna University in 1899, which was then newly possible for women. She wrote her thesis on the validity of the Helmholtz equation for various elements. Her doctoral adviser was Franz Serafin Exner. In 1903, she became the first woman to earn a physics doctorate at Vienna University. In the same year, she took her teacher's exam for secondary schools.

=== Work for girls' and women's education ===
For some years, Olga Steindler gave science lectures for women and girls on physics experiments, electricity, and other topics. She also taught at a girls' gymnasium (roughly equivalent to a preparatory high school or a grammar school) in Vienna. In 1907, she founded a girls' gymnasium in Leopoldstadt, Vienna, and the first commercial academy for girls (Wiener Handelsakademie für Mädchen) together with Olly Schwarz. She became principal of the Handelsakademie, which today is located in Josefstadt.

=== Private life ===
In 1908, she married her former fellow student, physicist Felix Ehrenhaft. They had two children, Johannes Leopold Friedrich, born on 10 October 1915, and Anna Maria Luise, born 19 February 1917. Both emigrated to the United States in the 1930s.

=== Later life and death ===
Olga Ehrenhaft-Steindler was awarded the Austrian honorary title Regierungsrat in 1927 or 1928 for her commitment to girls' and women's education, which was a rare distinction for women at the time, and the honorary title Hofrat in 1931.

She was diagnosed with breast cancer in 1929. She had surgery, but never fully recovered. Olga Ehrenhaft-Steindler acquired pneumonia in 1933 and died on 21 December that year from lung embolism, aged 54.

== Publications ==
- Steindler, Olga: Über die Temperaturcoeffizienten einiger Jodelemente ("About the temperature coefficients of some iodine elements"), doctoral thesis, 1903.
- Steindler, Olga: Die Farbempfindlichkeit des normalen und des farbenblinden Auges ("The colour sensitivity of the normal and colour-blind eye"), 1906.
