= Friedrich Schey von Koromla =

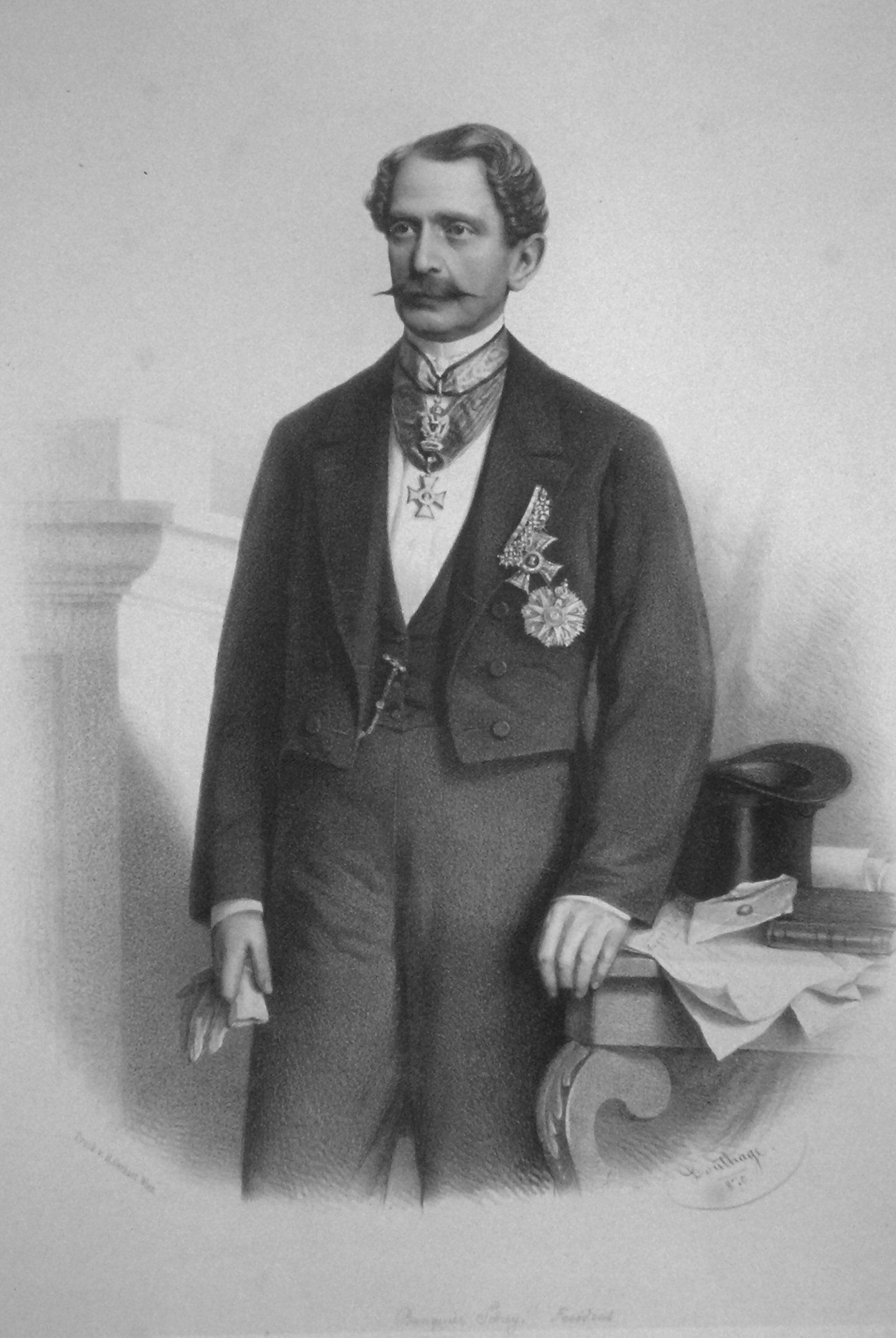
Koromla in 1870

Friedrich Schey Freiherr von Koromla (5 March 1815 – 15 July 1881) was an Austrian banker. Around 1863, he built Palais Schey von Koromla in Vienna.

== Life ==
Friedrich Schey was born on 5 March 1815 in Kőszeg. He was the son of a wealthy Jewish owner of a trading company. He attended high school in his hometown and then studied law at the Lyceum in Ödenburg and in 1831–1832 at the TU Wien. In 1835, he worked for the Wertheimstein banking house in Vienna, but returned to Kőszeg, where he joined his parents' business. In 1839, he married Emilie Landauer (1817–1840) and became a partner in his father-in-law's business. After the death of his first wife, Schey married her sister Charlotte Landauer (1820–1842) in 1840 and, four years after her death, the Landauer daughter Hermine (1822–1902). From this marriage came his son, the jurist Josef Schey von Koromla (1853–1938).

Friedrich Schey went to Vienna after the death of his father-in-law, became director of the Vöslauer Kammgarnfabrik in 1854, and founded the "Firma Schey, k. k. priv. Großhändler," which traded in textiles and conducted money transactions. He was banker to Archduke Albrecht and through this contact became a supplier to the Imperial Army. In 1857 he was one of the co-founders of the Vienna Business Academy and was its first president.

In 1859, together with his uncle, Philipp Schey (1798-1881), under the honorific Edler as well as the preposition of von Koromla; In 1860, he received the civil and political rights of the city of Vienna.

From 1859, he was a member of the board of directors of the Niederösterreichische Escompte-Gesellschaft for two years and, with an interruption in 1866, was director of the Austrian National Bank from 1861 to 1869.

In 1863, Schey von Koromla was elevated to knighthood. He had the Palais Schey von Koromla built in 1863/1864.

In 1865, he was appointed to the board of directors of the Securitas reinsurance company and was its vice president from 1869. He was a member of the board of directors of the Theissbahn from its foundation in 1856, became president of the Empress Elisabeth Railway in 1861, and led the negotiations for its nationalization, which was finally completed in 1884.

Schey von Koromla was considered a good violinist and amassed a collection of books. He sponsored the Vienna Municipal Theater, of which he was president, the construction of the Vienna Musikverein, the Künstlerhaus Wien, contributed to the financing of the Austro-Hungarian North Pole Expedition, and the erection of a number of monuments in Vienna.

In 1862, Friedrich Schey von Koromla received the Order of the Iron Crown Third Class and decorations from Prussia, France, Russia, Brazil, Mexico and other countries. He died on 15 July 1881 in Lainz (part of Vienna-Hietzing) and is buried in the family tomb in the Israelite section of the Vienna Central Cemetery.
