= Photophoresis =

Molecular migration under illumination

Photophoresis denotes the phenomenon that small particles suspended in gas (aerosols) or liquids (hydrocolloids) start to migrate when illuminated by a sufficiently intense beam of light. The existence of this phenomenon is owed to a non-uniform distribution of temperature of an illuminated particle in a fluid medium. Separately from photophoresis, in a fluid mixture of different kinds of particles, the migration of some kinds of particles may be due to differences in their absorptions of thermal radiation and other thermal effects collectively known as thermophoresis. In laser photophoresis, particles migrate once they have a refractive index different from their surrounding medium. The migration of particles is usually possible when the laser is slightly or not focused. A particle with a higher refractive index compared to its surrounding molecule moves away from the light source due to momentum transfer from absorbed and scattered light photons. This is referred to as a radiation pressure force. This force depends on light intensity and particle size but has nothing to do with the surrounding medium. Just like in Crookes radiometer, light can heat up one side and gas molecules bounce from that surface with greater velocity, hence push the particle to the other side. Under certain conditions, with particles of diameter comparable to the wavelength of light, the phenomenon of a negative indirect photophoresis occurs, due to the unequal heat generation on the laser irradiation between the back and front sides of particles, this produces a temperature gradient in the medium around the particle such that molecules at the far side of the particle from the light source may get to heat up more, causing the particle to move towards the light source.

If the suspended particle is rotating, it will also experience the Yarkovsky effect.

Discovery of photophoresis is usually attributed to Felix Ehrenhaft in the 1920s, though earlier observations were made by others including Augustin-Jean Fresnel.

== Applications of photophoresis ==
The applications of photophoresis expand into the various divisions of science, thus physics, chemistry as well as in biology. Photophoresis is applied in particle trapping and levitation, in the field flow fractionation of particles, in the determination of thermal conductivity and temperature of microscopic grains and also in the transport of soot particles in the atmosphere. The use of light in the separation of particles aerosols based on their optical properties, makes possible the separation of organic and inorganic particles of the same aerodynamic size.

Recently, photophoresis has been suggested as a chiral sorting mechanism for single walled carbon nanotubes. The proposed method would utilise differences in the absorption spectra of semiconducting carbon nanotubes arising from optically excited transitions in electronic structure. If developed the technique would be orders of magnitudes faster than currently established ultracentrifugation techniques.

In 2021 Azadi, Popov et al. report "light-driven levitation of macroscopic polymer films with nanostructured surface as candidates for long-duration near-space flight" Using a light intensity comparable to sunlight, they levitated centimeter-scale disks made of commercial 0.5-micron-thick mylar film coated with carbon nanotubes on one side. Experiments by Schafer, Kim, Vlassak and Keith suggest that photophoretic forces could levitate thin 10 centimetre-scale structures in Earth′s stratosphere indefinitely for the purpose of atmospheric science, especially monitoring high-altitude weather. They describe in 2022 a preliminary design fabricated with available methods of a 10 cm diameter device combining a levitating structure of two membranes 2 μm apart in a stiff support structure tested to have sufficient strength to withstand transport, deployment, and flight at 25 km altitude. Payload capacity is 300 mg and could support bidirectional radio communication at over 10 Mb/s and some navigational control. By upscaling the structure it might carry payloads of a few grams. They suggest uses for telecommunications, and deployment on Mars. In 2025 they followed with a mesospheric design.

== Theory of photophoresis ==
Direct photophoresis is caused by the transfer of photon momentum to a particle by refraction and reflection. Movement of particles in the forward direction occurs when the particle is transparent and has an index of refraction larger compared to its surrounding medium. Indirect photophoresis occurs as a result of an increase in the kinetic energy of molecules when particles absorb incident light only on the irradiated side, thus creating a temperature gradient within the particle. In this situation the surrounding gas layer reaches temperature equilibrium with the surface of the particle. Molecules with higher kinetic energy in the region of higher gas temperature impinge on the particle with greater momenta than molecules in the cold region; this causes a migration of particles in a direction opposite to the surface temperature gradient. The component of the photophoretic force responsible for this phenomenon is called the radiometric force. This comes as a result of uneven distribution of radiant energy (source function within a particle). Indirect photophoretic force depends on the physical properties of the particle and the surrounding medium.

For pressures $p$, where the free mean path of the gas is much larger than the characteristic size $r_0$ of the suspended particle (direct photophoresis), the longitudinal force is

$$\mathbf{F}_\text{phot} = -\frac{\pi}{3} \, \alpha \, \alpha_\text{m} \frac{p}{\sqrt{\overline{T_{\text{gas}}^\text{out}}\,T_{\text{gas}}^\text{in}}} \, r_0^2 \, 	\frac{I\,J_1}{\frac{k}{r_0}+4\sigma_\text{SB}\varepsilon\,T_{\text{black body}}^3} \, \mathbf{e}_z$$

where the mean temperature of the scattered gas is (thermal accommodation coefficient $\alpha$, momentum accommodation coefficient $\alpha_\text{m}$)

$$\overline{T_{\text{gas}}^{\text{out}}} = T_{\text{gas}}^\text{in}+\alpha\left(T_{\text{black body}}-T_{\text{gas}}^\text{in}\right)$$

and the black body temperature of the particle (net light flux $I=\varepsilon\,I_0$, Stefan Boltzmann constant $\sigma_{\text{SB}}$, temperature of the radiation field $T_{\text{opt}}$)

$$T_{\text{black body}} = \sqrt[4]{\frac{I_0}{4\sigma_{\text{SB}}}+T_{\text{opt}}^4}$$.

$k$ is the thermal conductivity of the particle. The asymmetry factor for spheres $J_1$ is usually $1/2$ (positive longitudinal photophoresis). For non-spherical particles, the average force exerted on the particle is given by the same equation where the radius $r_0$ is now the radius of the respective volume-equivalent sphere.
