= Drienica =

Municipality of Slovakia

- Municipality
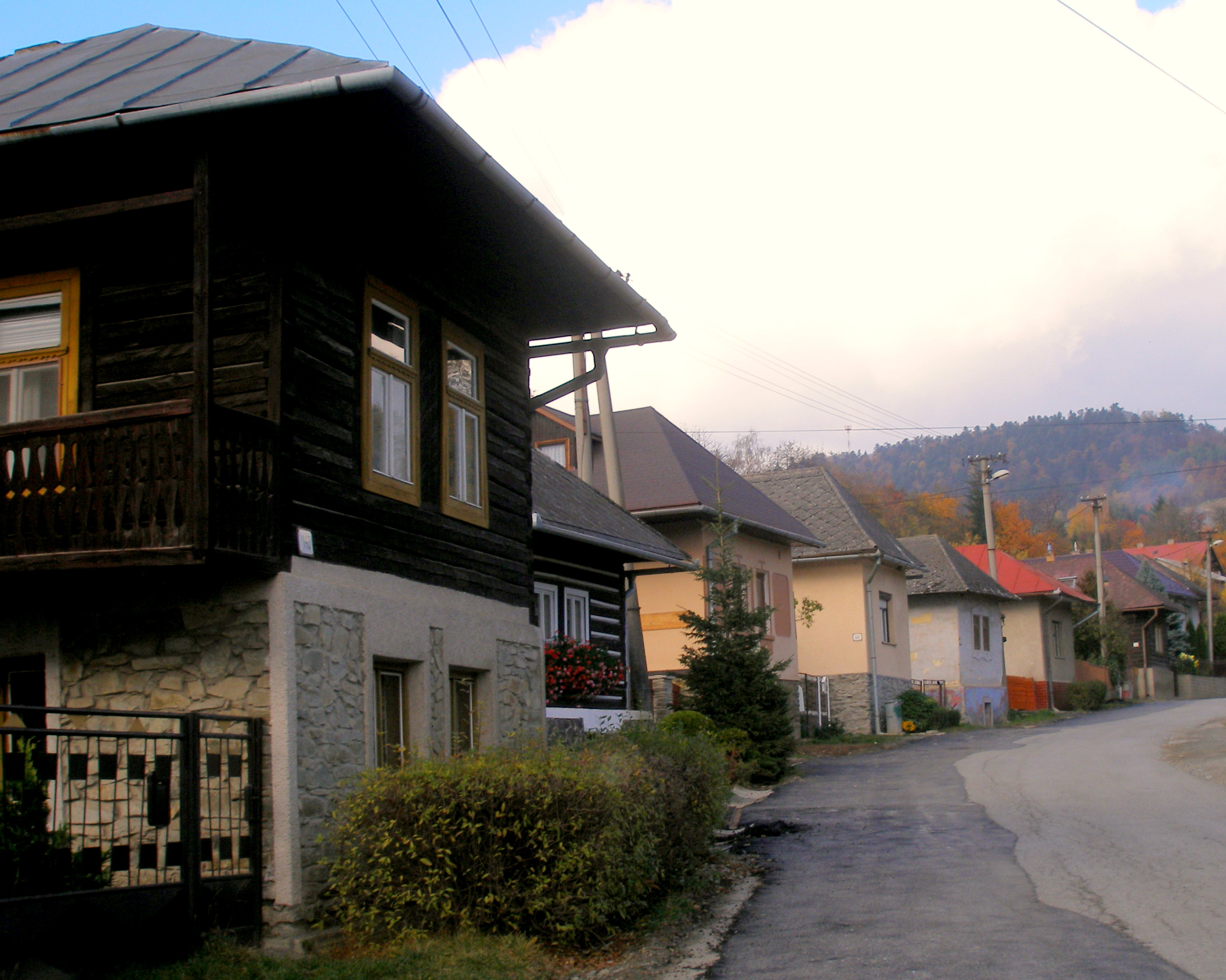

- Flag

- Location of Drienica in the Prešov Region Location of Drienica in Slovakia
- Coordinates: 49.13°N 21.12°E
- Country: Slovakia
- Region: Prešov Region
- District: Sabinov District
- First mentioned: 1343

Area
  - Total: 9.77 km^{2} (3.77 sq mi)
- Elevation: 458 m (1,503 ft)

Population (2025)
  - Total: 763
- Time zone: UTC+1 (CET)
  - Summer (DST): UTC+2 (CEST)
- Postal code: 830 1
- Area code: +421 51
- Vehicle registration plate (until 2022): SB
- Website: www.drienica.sk

Drienica is a village and municipality in Sabinov District in the Prešov Region of north-eastern Slovakia.

== History ==
In historical records the village was first mentioned in 1343.

== Geography ==
The municipality lies at an altitude of 458 metres (1,503 ft) and covers an area of 9.77 km^{2} (3.77 sq mi) (2025).

== Population ==
Population statistic (10 years)
| Year | 1995 | 2005 | 2015 | 2025 |
|---|---|---|---|---|
| Count | 668 | 687 | 736 | 763 |
| Difference | | +2.84% | +7.13% | +3.66% |

Population statistic
| Year | 2024 | 2025 |
|---|---|---|
| Count | 758 | 763 |
| Difference | | +0.65% |

It has a population of 763 people (31 December 2025).

=== Ethnicity ===
Census 2021 (1+ %)
| Ethnicity | Number | Fraction |
|---|---|---|
| Slovak | 744 | 98.02% |
| Rusyn | 37 | 4.87% |
| Not found out | 10 | 1.31% |
| Total | 759 | |

In year 2021 was 759 people by ethnicity 744 as Slovak, 37 as Rusyn, 10 as Not found out, 5 as Czech, 2 as Other and 1 as Ukrainian.

Note on population: The difference values of population numbers in the table "Population statistic" and in the sections "Ethnicity" & "Religion" is caused by the use of various statistical methods.

=== Religion ===
Census 2021 (1+ %)
| Religion | Number | Fraction |
|---|---|---|
| Greek Catholic Church | 420 | 55.34% |
| Roman Catholic Church | 218 | 28.72% |
| None | 46 | 6.06% |
| Eastern Orthodox Church | 45 | 5.93% |
| Not found out | 10 | 1.32% |
| Evangelical Church | 8 | 1.05% |
| Total | 759 | |

In year 2021 was 759 people by religion 420 from Greek Catholic Church, 218 from Roman Catholic Church, 46 from None, 45 from Eastern Orthodox Church, 10 from Not found out, 8 from Evangelical Church, 4 from Other and not ascertained christian church, 3 from Other, 2 from Ad hoc movements, 1 from Paganism and natural spirituality, 1 from United Methodist Church and 1 from Buddhism.

== Genealogical resources ==
The records for genealogical research are available at the state archive "Statny Archiv in Presov, Slovakia"

- Roman Catholic church records (births/marriages/deaths): 1676-1895 (parish B)
- Greek Catholic church records (births/marriages/deaths): 1846-1895 (parish A)

== See also ==
- List of municipalities and towns in Slovakia
