= Palais Schey von Koromla =

Palace in Vienna, Austria

Coordinates: 48°12′13″N 16°22′00″E

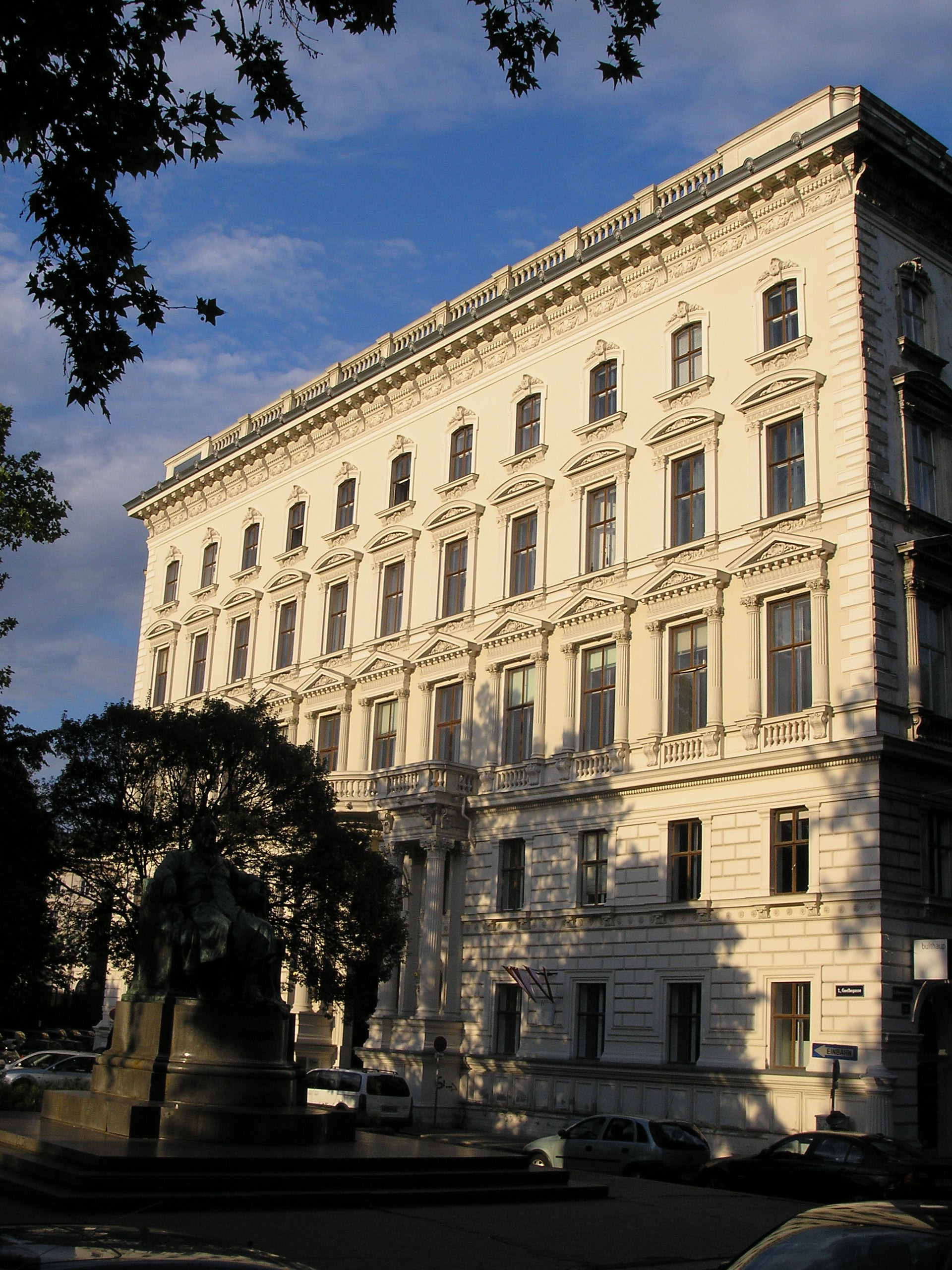
Palais Schey von Koromla

Palais Schey von Koromla, also known as Palais Schey (or erroneously as Palais Schey-Koromla), is a Ringstraßenpalais building in Vienna, Austria.

It was built in 1863/4 for banker Friedrich Schey von Koromla. It was part of the redevelopment initiated by Emperor Franz Joseph I which created the Ringstrasse on the land previously occupied by the obsolete Vienna city walls.

The interior survived Nazi rule and World War II.

The building was the setting for the television series Ringstraßenpalais.
