= Koromľa =

Village and municipality in Sobrance, Košice, Slovakia

Koromľa Koromlak
- Municipality
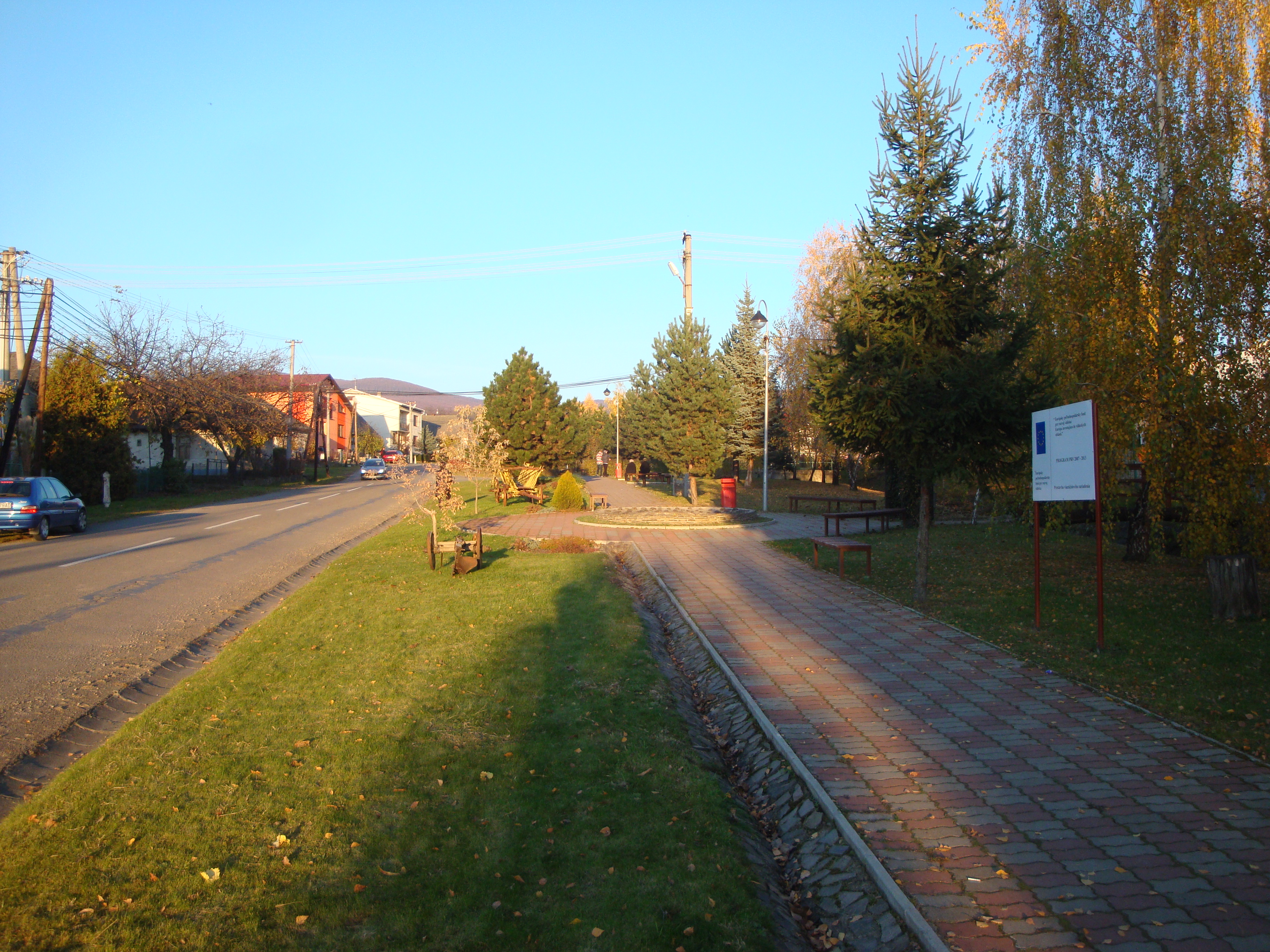

- Flag

- Location of Koromľa in the Košice Region Location of Koromľa in Slovakia
- Coordinates: 48.72°N 22.30°E
- Country: Slovakia
- Region: Košice Region
- District: Sobrance District
- First mentioned: 1337

Area
  - Total: 13.06 km^{2} (5.04 sq mi)
- Elevation: 275 m (902 ft)

Population (2025)
  - Total: 412
- Time zone: UTC+1 (CET)
  - Summer (DST): UTC+2 (CEST)
- Postal code: 726 2
- Area code: +421 56
- Vehicle registration plate (until 2022): SO
- Website: www.obeckoromla.sk

Koromľa (Hungarian: Koromlak) is a small village and municipality in the Sobrance District in the Košice Region of east Slovakia.

== Geography ==
The municipality lies at an altitude of 275 metres (902 ft) and covers an area of 13.06 km^{2} (5.04 sq mi) (2025).

== Population ==
Population statistic (10 years)
Year	1995	2005	2015	2025
Count	504	525	428	412
Difference		+4.16%	−18.47%	−3.73%

Population statistic
Year	2024	2025
Count	404	412
Difference		+1.98%

It has a population of 412 people (31 December 2025).

=== Ethnicity ===
Census 2021 (1+ %)
Ethnicity	Number	Fraction
Slovak	407	98.3%
Rusyn	6	1.44%
Total	414	

In year 2021 was 414 people by ethnicity 407 as Slovak, 6 as Rusyn, 2 as Ukrainian, 2 as Romani, 2 as Russian, 2 as Not found out, 1 as Polish and 1 as Other.

Note on population: The difference values of population numbers in the table "Population statistic" and in the sections "Ethnicity" & "Religion" is caused by the use of various statistical methods.

=== Religion ===
Census 2021 (1+ %)
Religion	Number	Fraction
Greek Catholic Church	310	74.88%
Roman Catholic Church	70	16.91%
None	23	5.56%
Total	414	

In year 2021 was 414 people by religion 310 from Greek Catholic Church, 70 from Roman Catholic Church, 23 from None, 4 from Eastern Orthodox Church, 3 from Not found out, 3 from Evangelical Church and 1 from Calvinist Church.

== Culture ==
The village has a public library, a gym, a football pitch, two stores, a pub and a post office.

There is one Greek Catholic church.

Interior of the Greek Catholic church

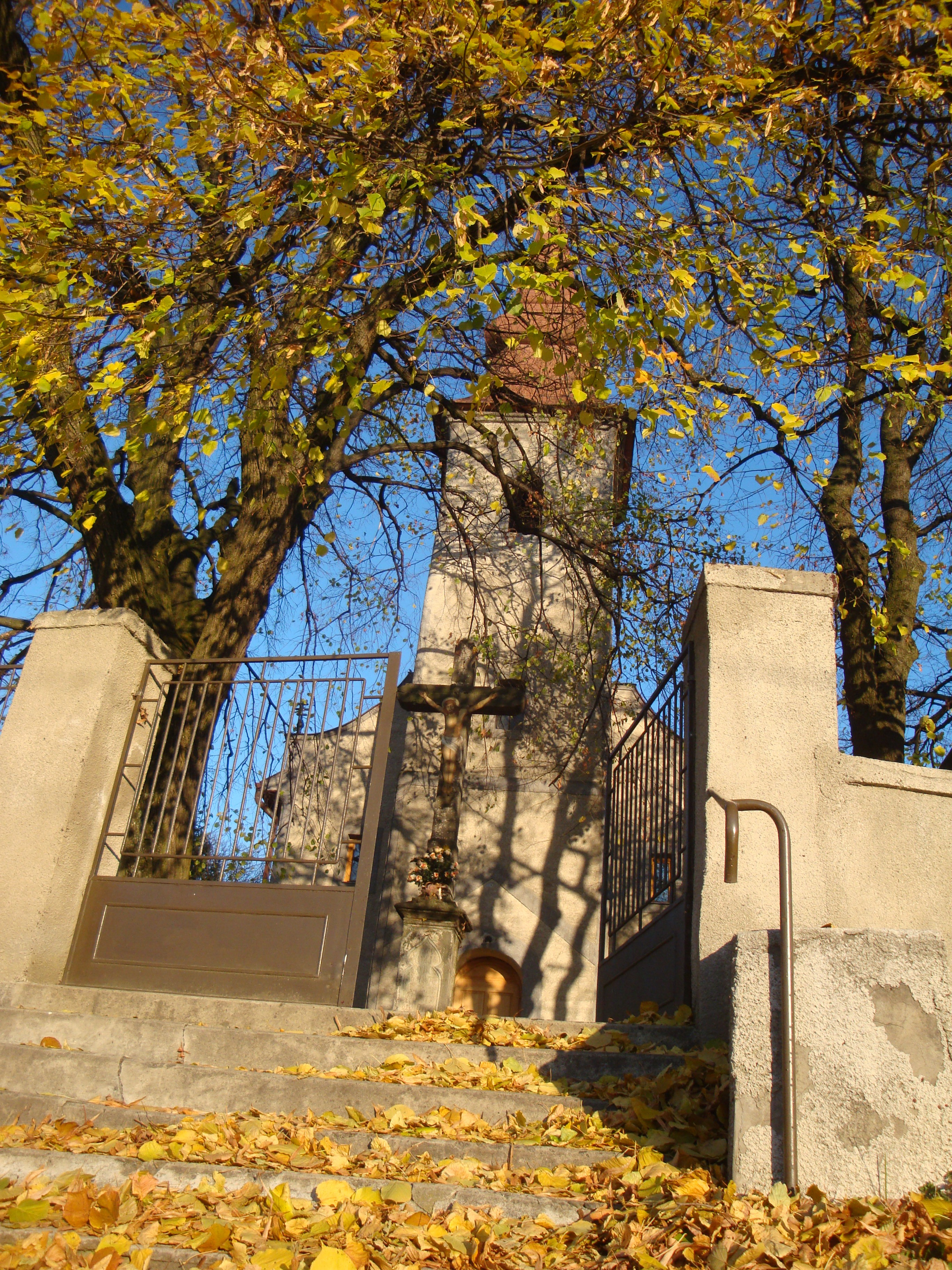
Front of the Greek Catholic church

A creek runs through the center of the village with a linear park between two roads.

== Genealogical resources ==
The records for genealogical research are available at the state archive "Statny Archiv in Presov, Slovakia"

- Roman Catholic church records (births/marriages/deaths): 1837–1931 (parish B)
- Greek Catholic church records (births/marriages/deaths): 1834–1902 (parish A)

== See also ==
- List of municipalities and towns in Slovakia
