= Giulio Superti-Furga =

Italian molecular and systems biologist

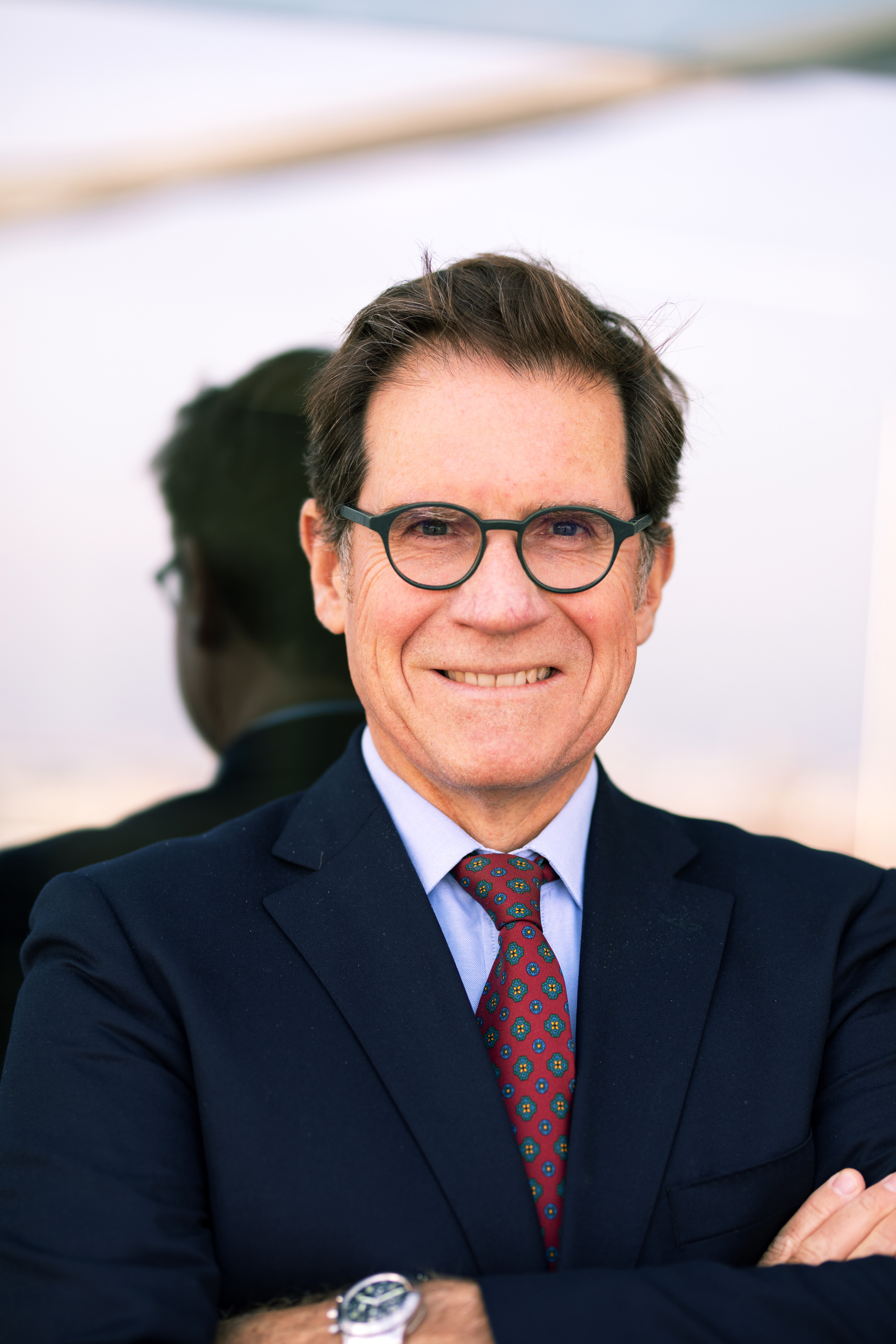
- Giulio Superti-Furga in 2019
- Born: 17 May 1962 (age 64); Milan, Italy
- Education: University of Zurich
- Known for: Systems biology, large-scale proteomics, Pharmacoscopy
- Scientific career
- Fields: Molecular Biology, Medical Systems Biology, Pharmacology
- Workplaces: CeMM Research Center for Molecular Medicine of the Austrian Academy of Sciences, Medical University of Vienna, European Molecular Biology Laboratory (EMBL), University of Bologna
- Academic advisors: Meinrad Busslinger, Max Birnstiel, Charles Weissmann, Giulio Draetta and Sara Courtneidge
- Website: www.superti-furga-lab.at

Giulio Superti-Furga (born 17 May 1962 in Milan) is an Italian molecular and systems biologist based in Vienna, Austria. He is the Scientific Director of CeMM Research Center for Molecular Medicine of the Austrian Academy of Sciences (CeMM), and Professor of Medical Systems Biology at the Medical University of Vienna. He was Chair of EU-LIFE (2024-2025), the alliance of research institutes advocating for excellent research in Europe.

Among his most significant scientific achievements to date are the elucidation of basic regulatory mechanisms of tyrosine kinases in human cancers, the identification of the molecular mechanisms of several drugs, and the discovery of fundamental organization principles of the proteome and the lipidome of higher organisms, as well as the characterization of molecular components relevant for innate immunity. His work has directly contributed to a systems-level understanding of pathogen infections in host cells and of the mechanism of action of specific drugs. He is an advocate for the adoption of systems biology approaches for medicine and in particular for drug discovery. Recently, he focused his research on membrane transporters, which are at the interface between biological systems and the environment. Despite their relevance for medicine and drug discovery, these proteins remain understudied and demand a intensive systematic study.

In 2008, he was awarded the Knight Officer Order of Merit of the Republic of Italy for his contributions to science. In 2011, Giulio Superti-Furga was awarded with the prize of the City of Vienna for natural sciences and designated as "Austria's Scientist of the Year". In June 2017, was awarded the title of Commendatore (Commander) dell'Ordine al Merito della Repubblica Italiana (Order of Merit of the Italian Republic) by HE Giorgio Marrapodi, Ambassador of Italy.

He is the brother of Andrea Superti-Furga, pediatrician and geneticist based in Switzerland.

== Career ==
Giulio Superti-Furga was educated at the German School of Milan (DSM) in Milan, Italy. He performed his undergraduate and graduate studies in Molecular Biology with Meinrad Busslinger, Max Birnstiel and Charles Weissmann at the University of Zurich, at Genentech Inc. in San Francisco and at the Research Institute of Molecular Pathology (IMP) in Vienna. Giulio Superti-Furga was a post-doctoral fellow with Giulio Draetta, Sara Courtneidge at the European Molecular Biology Laboratory (EMBL) in Heidelberg.

In 1995, he became Team Leader at EMBL in Heidelberg. From 1997 to 2000 he served as Guest Professor of Molecular Biology at the University of Bologna, Italy. Since 2005 he has been Scientific Director of CeMM Research Center for Molecular Medicine of the Austrian Academy of Sciences and guest professor for Molecular Pharmacology at the Medical University of Vienna. Since 2015 he has been appointed Professor of Medical Systems Biology at the Medical University of Vienna.

Giulio Superti-Furga is a full member of the Austrian Academy of Sciences, the German Academy of Sciences Leopoldina, the European Molecular Biology Organization (EMBO), the European Academy of Cancer Sciences, the Academia Europaea and chaired the board of the EMBL Alumni Association, which has ~2,500 members, until 2015. From 2013 to 2016 he was the ninth member of the Board of the University of Vienna. From 2017 to 2019 he was member of the Scientific Council of the ERC (European Research Council). The ERC is the most important and prestigious funding institution for basic research in any field conducted within the European Union. In 2018 he became the academic coordinator of the Innovative Medicines Initiative (IMI) project RESOLUTE, a private public partnership including several universities, pharmaceutical companies and a biotech company to functionally understand solute carrier (SLCs) membrane transporters. In 2021 he also became the academic coordinator of the Innovative Medicines Initiative REsolution project, which focus on the annotation and experiment study of SLC genetic variants.

== Personal genome ==
Giulio Superti-Furga's work also deals with the societal framework and ethical implications of biomedical research. At CeMM, there is a strong emphasis on a continuous dialogue with society and a responsible use of resources and technologies. Since the end of 2014, Giulio Superti-Furga chairs the steering board of the personal genome project Genom Austria, the Austrian Personal Genome Project initiative within the Global Network of Personal Genome Projects where he also participated: his personal genome sequence PGA1 is publicly available. He is probably the first person whose entire own genome was given open access to in continental Europe.

== Research ==
According to Google Scholar, Giulio Superti-Furga has published more than 260 manuscripts that have been collectively cited > 47,000 times, reflected by an h-index of 100. The article "Functional organization of the yeast proteome by systematic analysis of protein complexes" by Gavin, AC*, 36 authors, Superti-Furga G* (* shared correspondence), Nature 2002 has been cited almost 6,000 times.

As scientific director of CeMM, Giulio Superti-Furga promoted a unique mode of super-cooperation, connecting biology with medicine, experiments with computation, discovery with translation, and science with society and the arts. His research activities cover a broad set of disciplines from structural biology to clinical diagnostics, from immunology to metabolism, from atomic resolution to network structures. His previous work focused on immunity and metabolism combined with the selective uptake of molecules and integrating it with drug action. Recent research interests of Giulio Superti-Furga include novel ways to create functional personalized medicine approaches and understanding the role of the human membrane transporters in pathophysiology and drug discovery.

=== Metabolism and regulation of metabolite concentration ===
Membrane transporters can be considered the managers of the interface between chemistry and biology and between organisms and their environment. Membrane transporters, and their roles in metabolism, drug transport and signaling are being investigated heavily in Giulio Superti-Furga's laboratory. As they are overall a large and neglected gene family in humans, Giulio Superti-Furga proposed to intensify and coordinate research on the largest group of membrane transporters in the human genome, the solute carrier (SLC) superfamily.

A large part of Giulio Superti-Furga's laboratory in working in the RESOLUTE and REsolution projects supported by the IMI, the EU and the EFPIA. RESOLUTE and REsolution are private-public partnerships co-led by Giulio Superti-Furga and Claire Steppan (Pfizer). On one hand, RESOLUTE's goal is to intensify research on SLCs worldwide and to establish them as a novel target class for medical research. On the other hand, The REsolution project focuses on human genetic variations in transporters and their link to human disease, and it links the RESOLUTE knowledge to physiology and disease through human genetics. To that end, RESOLUTE and REsolution are empowering the scientific community with biological tools and data sets for SLC research, developing robust transport assays, and compiling the information in the SLC knowledgebase.

Besides the systems biology approach used in RESOLUTE / REsolution for the whole family of SLCs, Giulio's laboratory also focuses on individual transporters. His lab showed that the supply of purines, as well as the purine synthesis of a cell can influence BRD4 activity and thus play a role in the carcinogenesis process. Additionally, in cooperation with scientists from the University of Bari, Giulio's lab identified the protein responsible for the important transport of NAD into mitochondria: the SLC25A51 transporter. Also his laboratory contributed to elucidate the role of SLC38A9 in the mechanism by which the cell recognizes the presence of amino acids and thereby controls mTOR activity.

=== Personalized medicine ===
The central aim of personalized medicine is to find the right treatment for the right patient at the right time. Giulio Superti-Furga developed new approaches with applications in precision medicine. In collaboration with the Medical University of Vienna, Giulio developed a technique called "Pharmacoscopy" to screen primary patient material using automated confocal microscopy and quantify single-cell events such as differential cell death, protein expression, cell morphology – creating robust and unique data sets. This technology allowed to determine the best treatment for patients with late stage and refractory hematological malignancies. Within the framework of EXALT (Extended Analysis for Leukemia/Lymphoma Treatment), this novel approach was tested and the result was that most advanced patients with aggressive hematological cancers clearly benefited from the approach.

=== Cancer and drug discovery ===
Giulio Superti-Furga's research has a long-standing interest in understanding the molecular wiring of transformed cells of the haematopoietic system, as well as studying the mode of action of targeted agents counteracting leukemia cell proliferation.

Giulio Superti-Furga's lab, in collaboration with the Medical University of Vienna, identified sensitivities among 15 myeloid leukemia cell lines by using a small drug library (CeMM Library of Metabolic Drugs; CLIMET) targeting a variety of metabolic pathways. Previously, he also showed that SLC proteins located in different sub-cellular compartments are amenable to degradation by ligand-induced proteolysis. Furthermore, in a pioneering study by his laboratory, they found that a particular transporter, was required for an experimental cancer drug to enter cells and exert its activity, which later led to a systematic investigation on the role of transporters in determining the activity of a large and diverse set of cytotoxic compounds. In 2018, driven by the interest in identifying underlying genetic determinants of drug response in a specific type of cancer of the haematopoietic system, his lab reported on the mechanistic link between RAS and the LZTR1 gene, previously associated with a variety of rare disorders. Furthermore, Giulio's lab with Florian Grebien's lab and Johannes Zuber's lab were able to identify common, conserved molecular mechanisms that drive oncogenesis in the context of the large number of different MLL-fusion proteins.

His laboratory has been also interested in better characterize the impact of known drugs on cells, using various omics approaches. The laboratory developed a small molecule interaction mapping technology using mass spectrometric thermal stability shifts at the proteome-wide level. Giulio also identified new target candidates for known drugs, previously unknown mechanisms of drug resistance, "effector" genes for the compounds, mechanisms of synergy between compounds and, in a few cases, indeed new medical use of existing drugs.

=== Innate immunity, inflammation and infection ===
Giulio Superti-Furga is also interested in understanding how the body responds to foreign threats, such as bacterial and viral infections, and how autoimmune defenses are triggered when these defenses go awry. Recently, his lab determined by biochemistry and mass spectrometry the molecular interactions that involved SLC15A4, which led to the identification of an uncharacterized protein CXorf21 (named TASL). Strikingly, the lab found that TASL harbors a specific motif essential for the recruitment and activation of IRF5.

Over the past decade, his lab has discovered that viruses employ a multitude of ways to both subvert as well as coup the host cellular system, and that the host largely relies on the homeostasis of the cellular system to detect and inhibit viral intrusion. Furthermore, in collaboration with the University of Geneva, discovered that SLC4A7 plays an essential role in phagocytosis and phagosome acidification. His research also combined genetic perturbations of sphingolipid metabolism with the quantification of diverse steps in TLR signaling and mass spectrometry-based lipidomics, which revealed that membrane lipid composition was affected by these perturbations.

== Technology transfer and innovation ==
Giulio Superti-Furga is interested in many aspects of science, from hard-core biochemistry and molecular biology to the processes leading to innovation and creativity of whole communities. Since early in his career, he has navigated between academia and the biotechnology industry and he has co-founded 5 biotech companies.

In 2000, he co-founded the biotech company Cellzome Inc., where he served as Scientific Director. Later in 2010, Giulio Superti-Furga co-founded the biotechnology company Haplogen GmbH in Vienna, a CeMM spin-off focused on haploid genetics. Haplogen Genomics together with CeMM released in 2013 the world's largest collection of engineered human haploid knockout cell lines for biomedical discovery. In 2015 Haplogen became part of the Horizon Discovery group as Horizon Genomics GmbH. In 2016 Giulio co-founded the company Allcyte GmbH focusing on drug testing in primary human material, which became part of the AI-driven pharmatech company Exscientia in 2021. In 2020 he co-founded Proxygen GmbH to develop molecular glue degraders as drugs. Also in 2020, he co-founded Solgate GmbH which develops drugs against solute carrier (SLC) membrane transporters.

== Honors/Awards/Memberships ==
- 2004–2010: Faculty of 1000 Biology, Member, Genomics Section
- 2005: European Molecular Biology Organization (EMBO), Member
- 2007: Austrian Academy of Sciences, Corresponding Member
- 2008: German Academy of Sciences Leopoldina, Member
- 2008: Dance Your PhD Contest, Science Magazine, Winner Professor Category
- 2009: Order of Merit of the Republic of Italy, Officer (Ufficiale)
- 2009: Austrian Society of Allergology and Immunology, Karl Landsteiner Prize
- 2009: European Research Council, Advanced Grant, iFIVE
- 2010: European Academy of Cancer Sciences, Fellow
- 2010: Austrian Academy of Sciences, Full Member
- 2011: Austrian Scientist of the Year
- 2011: Prize of the City of Vienna for Natural Sciences
- 2011: European Research Council, Proof of Concept Grant
- 2013–2016: Board of the University of Vienna, elected member
- 2014: Academia Europaea, Member
- 2016: European Research Council, Proof of Concept Grant
- 2016: European Research Council, Advanced Grant, Game of Gates
- 2017: Order of Merit of the Republic of Italy, Commander (Commendatore)
- 2018: Innovative Medicines Initiative, academic coordinator of the RESOLUTE project
- 2021: Innovative Medicines Initiative, academic coordinator of the REsolution project
