= Andrea Pauli =

German developmental biologist and biochemist

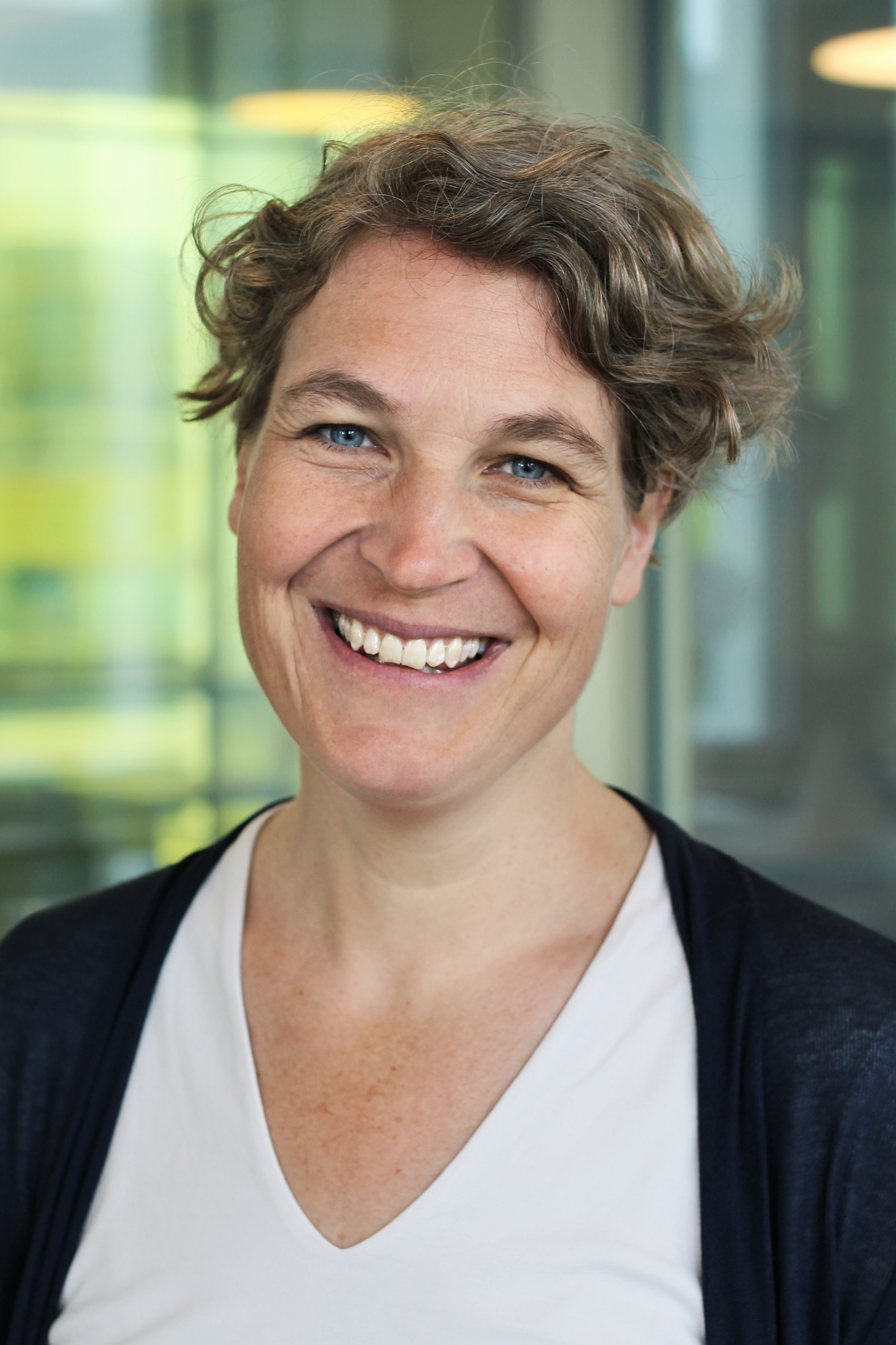
- Born: 1977 (age 48–49)
- Education: Regensburg University (diploma); Heidelberg University (MSc); University of Oxford (PhD)
- Awards: ERC Consolidator Grant (2022); EMBO Member (2021); HFSP Young Investigator (2020); EMBO Young Investigator (2018)
- Scientific career
- Fields: molecular basis of vertebrate fertilisation
- Workplaces: Research Institute of Molecular Pathology; Harvard University; University of Oxford
- Doctoral advisor: Kim Nasmyth
- Other academic advisors: Alexander F. Schier
- Website: www.imp.ac.at/groups/andrea-pauli/

Andrea Pauli (born 1977) is a developmental biologist and biochemist studying how the egg transitions into an embryo, and more specifically the molecular mechanisms underlying vertebrate fertilisations, egg dormancy, and subsequent egg activation. Her lab uses zebrafish as the main model organism. Andrea Pauli is a group leader at the Research Institute of Molecular Pathology (IMP) at the Vienna Biocenter in Austria.

== Early life and education ==
Andrea Pauli grew up in Bavaria, Germany. She studied biochemistry at Regensburg University, followed by a master's in molecular and cellular biology at Heidelberg University. In 2004, she started her doctoral research under the joint supervision of Barry Dickson and Kim Nasmyth at the Research Institute of Molecular Pathology (IMP) in Vienna, Austria. When Nasmyth transferred to the University of Oxford in 2006, Pauli moved with him and obtained her PhD from Oxford in 2009. As a student, she competed twice in the Oxford-Cambridge Women's Boat Race (2007 and 2008) for Oxford.

== Career ==
Andrea Pauli became a postdoctoral researcher in the lab of Alexander F. Schier at Harvard University in 2009. In 2015, she returned to the IMP to establish her own lab as a group leader. Since 2018, Pauli teaches zebrafish summer courses at the Marine Biological Laboratory in Woods Hole and in 2020, she became the dean of the Vienna Biocenter summer school.

== Research ==
Andrea Pauli's doctoral research focused on cohesin, a protein complex initially known for its essential role in holding sister chromatids together during cell division. Using Drosophila melanogaster as a model system, Pauli showed new cohesin functions in non-proliferating cells. Pauli later turned to zebrafish as model system and to characterising embryonic transcripts, through which she discovered the essential embryonic signal Toddler/Apela/ELABELA, a secreted peptide necessary for mesoderm migration during gastrulation. This demonstrated that newly identified translated regions can encode previously missed yet functionally important small proteins. Research in Pauli's lab links developmental biology with biochemistry, molecular and cell biology and genomics in order to uncover essential mechanisms underlying the egg-to-embryo transition. Pauli and her lab have discovered mechanisms underlying embryo morphogenesis, fertilisation and egg dormancy. This includes the discovery that Toddler acts as a guidance cue which steers the directional migration of mesodermal cells via a single-receptor-based self-generated Toddler gradient. Focusing on fertilisation, Pauli and her lab identified the egg protein Bouncer as an essential factor for sperm-egg recognition in fish: Bouncer is essential for sperm entry into the egg and sufficient to switch the species-specificity of fertilisation between zebrafish and medaka. Pauli's lab characterized the functions of Bouncer's homolog in mammals, SPACA4, and the zebrafish sperm factors Dcst1/2 and Spaca6, which are conserved in mammals and required for fertilisation in vertebrates. Studying the mechanistic basis of dormancy in the egg, Pauli's lab discovered a developmentally programmed, conserved dormant ribosome state important for ribosome storage and translational repression, which is conserved in zebrafish and Xenopus laevis.

== Awards and achievements ==
- ERC Consolidator Grant (2022)
- Elected EMBO Member (2021)
- HFSP Young Investigator Grant (2020)
- EMBO Young Investigator (2018)
- Whitman Center Early Career Fellowship (2018)
- Start Prize of the Austrian Science Fund FWF (2017)
- HFSP Career Development Award (2015)
- Chi-Bin Chien Award (2014)
- NIH K99 Grant for transitioning to independence (2013)

== Selected publications ==
- Deneke, V. E. et al. “A conserved fertilization complex bridges sperm and egg in vertebrates.” Cell (2024).
- Leesch, F. et al. “A molecular network of conserved factors keeps ribosomes dormant in the egg.” Nature (2023).
- Herberg, S.; Gert, K. R.; Schleiffer, A.; Pauli, A. “The Ly6/uPAR protein Bouncer is necessary and sufficient for species-specific fertilization.” Science 361(6406), 1029–1033 (2018).
- Pauli, A. et al. “Toddler: An embryonic signal that promotes cell movement via apelin receptors.” Science 343, 1248636 (2014).
