= Martin Zenke =

German scientist (born 1953)

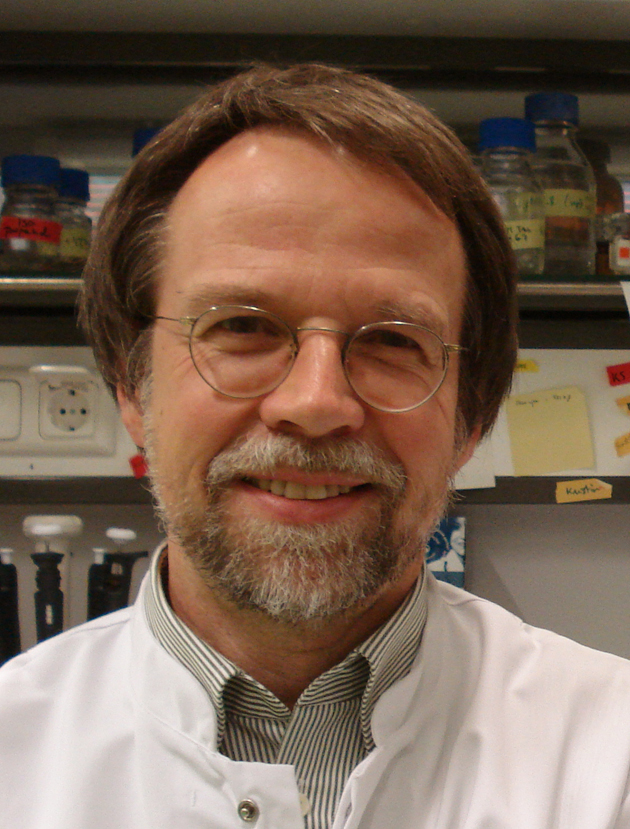
- Born: August 7, 1953 (age 73); Korbach, Germany
- Education: University of Marburg (MSc); Heidelberg University (PhD)
- Scientific career
- Fields: stem cell research, cell biology, molecular biology, cancer biology, bioengineering
- Workplaces: Rheinisch-Westfälische Technische Hochschule (RWTH); Max Delbrück Center for Molecular Medicine (MDC); University of Vienna; Research Institute of Molecular Pathology (IMP); European Molecular Biology Laboratory (EMBL); Louis Pasteur University; German Cancer Research Center (DKFZ)
- Thesis: Transcription of SV40 Chromatin (1982)

Martin Zenke (born August 7, 1953, in Korbach) is a German biochemist, cell biologist, professor for cell biology and scientist, who is conducting research on stem cells and biomedical engineering.

== Biography ==
Martin Zenke grew up in Korbach/Waldeck, Germany and finished school at Alte Landesschule in Korbach in 1972. He studied chemistry/biochemistry and medicine at Philipps-University, Marburg/Lahn, Germany (1972-1978) and graduated in 1978 with a study on “The ribonucleotide reductase in synchronized cultures of Saccharomyces cerevisiae (baker’s yeast)”.

== Professional career ==
In 1979 he moved to German Cancer Research Center (DKFZ), Heidelberg, Institute of Virology, Section DNA Tumor Viruses (Gerhard Sauer) for doctoral studies. He received his PhD from Ruprecht-Karls-University, Heidelberg in 1982 on “Transcription of SV40 Chromatin”.

From 1982 to 1985 Martin Zenke worked as postdoctoral fellow with Pierre Chambon at Université Louis Pasteur, Faculté de Médecine and Laboratoire de Genetique Moleculaire des Eucaryotes (LGME) in Strasbourg, France. From 1985 to 1988 he was EMBL fellow and staff scientist in the Differentiation Programme of European Molecular Biology Laboratory (EMBL), Heidelberg, Germany with Thomas Graf and Hartmut Beug.

In 1988 he moved to the Research Institute of Molecular Pathology (IMP), Vienna, Austria to work as a Junior Scientist until 1995. In 1992 he received his senior lecture qualification in Molecular Genetics from the Faculty of Natural Sciences, University of Vienna, Vienna, Austria. From 1995 to 2003 Martin Zenke was a Research Group Leader at Max Delbrück Center for Molecular Medicine (MDC) in Berlin, Germany.

Since 2003 he is Professor of Cell Biology and Chairman, and the founding director of the Institute for Biomedical Engineering, Chair of Cell Biology at Rheinisch-Westfälische Technische Hochschule (RWTH) Medical School, Aachen, Germany. Since 2008 he is a member of the "Central Ethics Committee for Stem Cell Research", Federal Ministry of Education and Research (BMBF) and Federal Ministry of Health (BMG), Berlin, Germany. 2011-2014 he was the Managing Director of Helmholtz-Institute for Biomedical Engineering (3 years legislative period), RWTH Aachen University, Aachen, Germany.

== Main research ==
1979-1986: SV40 Enhancer and SV40 Chromatin

In the 1980s Martin Zenke’s research focused on gene transcription and chromatin. In 1986 he and his colleagues showed that transcriptional enhancers exhibit a modular structure and are composed of individual elements, which on their own are relatively weak but act in synergy, and thereby build up enhancer activity. This is textbook knowledge nowadays but in the 1980s enhancers were initially thought to boost transcription by a unique and particular strong enhancer sequence and factor. Martin Zenke’s seminal work is depicted and referenced in Lewin’s Genes IX, the standard molecular biology textbook.

1986-1998: The erbA Oncogene and Red Blood Cell Differentiation

In 1988 Martin Zenke started to work on retroviral oncogenes, in particular on the v-erbA and v-rel oncogenes. He found that the v-erbA oncogene is a loss of function version of the c-erbA/thyroid hormone receptor and acts as a dominant negative transcriptional repressor. This was the first description of oncogenic activity by loss-of-function mutation. This discovery was surprising, since up to then oncogenic potential was believed to be solely due to activating mutations.

The erbA work led Martin Zenke to work on red blood cell differentiation, focussing on the just discovered GATA transcription factors. He found that GATA-1 promotes red blood cell development whereas GATA-2 blocks red blood cell development. These findings were the first to suggest GATA-2 function in early blood cell development.

1995-today: Stem Cells and Antigen Presenting Dendritic Cells

At the beginning of the 1990s, the studies on the v-rel oncogene led Martin Zenke to work on antigen presenting dendritic cells (DC), a specific immune cell, which is important for immunity and immune tolerance. DC biology was poorly understood at that time and Martin Zenke was one of the first to apply gene expression profiling with DNA microarrays for gene mining. This work led to the discovery of the Id2 transcription factor in DC development. The Id2 gene data sets received accession numbers 1 and 2 (E-MEXP-1 and E-MEXP-2) of the ArrayExpress database, one of the two major genomic data repositories, which now contains several million entries.

The DC work is being followed mainly in the mouse system, to study gene circuitries of DC development and function using RNA-Seq, ChIP-seq, ATAC-seq, chromosome conformation capture (4C) and CRISPR/Cas9 gene editing, and more recently in the human system using induced pluripotent stem cells (iPS cells).

2005-today: Pluripotent Stem Cells and Disease Modeling

Hematopoietic stem cells have been Martin Zenke’s prime interest for many years and in the 2005s he broadened his interest to also include pluripotent stem cells, such as embryonic stem cells (ES cells) and the more recently discovered induced pluripotent stem cells (iPS cells).

A particular focus is on disease and patient specific iPS cells for disease modeling and compound screening. Emphasis is put on studying hematopoietic malignancies, thereby building on the close collaboration with preclinical and clinical partners. This focus also includes developing animal models of diseases and laboratory automation for cell production.

Martin Zenke also worked also on technology development: Automatic DNA sequencing, and gene delivery into cells.

== Publications ==
- List of publications in PubMed (U.S. National Library of Medicine und National Institutes of Health)
