= Tomo Tanaka =

British life sciences research scientist (born 1962)

- Born: Tomoyuki U Tanaka; 1962 (age 63–64); Japan
- Education: University of Tokyo
- Known for: The study of chromosome segregation in mitosis
- Scientific career
- Fields: Cell and molecular biology
- Workplaces: University of Dundee
- Website: www.lifesci.dundee.ac.uk/people/tomo-tanaka

Tomo Tanaka FRSE, born in Japan in 1962, is a professor and research scientist based in the Cell and Molecular Biology unit of the School of Life Sciences at the University of Dundee, as well as being a Wellcome Trust Principal Research Fellow.

His research group has been studying the mechanisms of chromosome segregation in mitosis, chromosome organisation in the nucleus, and how abnormalities in these processes lead to diseases.

== Early life and career ==
He graduated in 1987 from the University of Tokyo with Medical degree and continued his studies at the same institution with a Ph.D. in Medical sciences in 1995.

He worked as a Research Fellow and Medical Staff at the University of Tokyo from 1987 to 1996. He started his postdoctoral research at the Research Institute of Molecular Pathology in Vienna in 1996 and became Staff Scientist in 1999. In 2001, he became a lecturer and Principal Investigator at the University of Dundee. He was promoted as Professor of Cell and Molecular Biology in 2007.
