= Courtneidge =

Courtneidge is a surname. Notable people with the surname include:

- Cicely Courtneidge (1893–1980), Australian-born British actress, comedian and singer
- Robert Courtneidge (1859–1939), British theatrical manager-producer and playwright
- Sara A. Courtneidge, cancer research scientist
