= Thomas Graf =

Thomas Graf may refer to:

- Thomas Graf (biologist) (born 1944), German scientist
- Thomas Graf (luger), Italian luger
