= Jan-Michael Peters =

German biologist (born 1962)

- Born: 16 August 1962 (age 64); Schleswig-Holstein, Germany
- Citizenship: German
- Education: University of Kiel (MSc); University of Heidelberg (PhD)
- Awards: European Research Council (ERC) Advanced Grant (2016); Full Member of the Austrian Academy of Sciences (ÖAW) (2014); Wittgenstein Award (2011); Elected European Molecular Biology Organisation (EMBO) member (2002)
- Scientific career
- Fields: cell biology, molecular biology
- Workplaces: Research Institute of Molecular Pathology (IMP); Harvard Medical School; German Cancer Research Center (DKFZ)
- Thesis: Strukturelle und molekularbiologische Untersuchung eines ubiquitären 15S-Mg2+-ATPase-Komplexes (1991)
- Doctoral advisor: Werner Franke

Jan-Michael Peters (born 16 August 1962) is a German cell and molecular biologist whose research focuses on genome organisation and chromosome segregation. He has been scientific director of the Research Institute of Molecular Pathology (IMP) in Vienna since 2013.

== Early life and education ==
Peters was born and grew up in Schleswig-Holstein. He has described an interest in biology dating back to his childhood.

Peters began studying biology at the University of Kiel in 1982, where he received his pre-diploma. In 1988, he completed his diploma studies at the University of Heidelberg, where he also obtained his PhD in cell biology in 1991. His doctoral supervisor was Werner Franke. His doctoral research included the identification and characterisation of p97 ATPase and its relationship to other members of the enzyme family now known as AAA ATPases, as well as the purification and characterisation of the 26S proteasome.

== Career and research ==
=== Career ===
Between 1992 and 1993, Peters worked as a postdoctoral fellow with Franke at the German Cancer Research Center (DKFZ) in Heidelberg, continuing his research on p97 ATPase and the 26S proteasome. His work showed that 26S proteasomes are present in both the cytoplasm and the cell nucleus. He also proposed that their 19S regulatory complexes use ATP hydrolysis to bind and unfold protein substrates and transport them into the proteolytic 20S core.

In 1994, Peters joined the laboratory of Marc W. Kirschner at Harvard Medical School in Boston as a postdoctoral fellow, where he contributed to the discovery of the anaphase-promoting complex/cyclosome (APC/C), which regulates chromosome segregation.

Peters joined the IMP in 1996 as a junior group leader and became a senior scientist in 2002. He was appointed scientific deputy director in 2011 and scientific director in 2013, succeeding Barry Dickson.

=== Chromosome segregation and cell division ===
Peters's research group studies the molecular mechanisms of chromosome organisation, chromosome segregation and cell division. His work has examined the regulation and mechanisms of proteins involved in chromosome segregation during mitosis, including APC/C and polo-like kinase 1 (PLK1). He also contributed to research on PLK1 inhibition as a potential approach to cancer treatment, including a study showing that the inhibitor BI 2536 inhibited tumour growth in preclinical models.

=== Genome organisation and cohesin ===
Peters and his colleagues contributed to establishing how cohesin organises genomic DNA through loop extrusion. Their research showed that topologically associating domains and chromatin loops depend on cohesin, and that cohesin-associated proteins, including WAPL, CTCF and PDS5 proteins, regulate the organisation of these structures. WAPL limits the length and lifetime of loops by promoting cohesin release from chromatin, while CTCF helps determine their genomic positions.

In 2019, his group used biochemical reconstitution and single-molecule imaging to demonstrate that human cohesin, together with NIPBL–MAU2, acts as an ATP-dependent motor protein that extrudes DNA into loops.

His group has also investigated the consequences of mutations affecting cohesin and its regulators. A 2022 study showed that several NIPBL mutations associated with Cornelia de Lange syndrome impair cohesin-mediated DNA loop extrusion, suggesting that defects in this process may contribute to the disorder. His laboratory also studies how cohesin mutations affect genome architecture in cancer.

=== Collaborative research projects ===
Peters coordinated EuroDYNA, a European Science Foundation research programme, between 2005 and 2008. Research associated with the programme included work on the relationship between cohesin and CTCF in gene regulation. Peters and his colleagues showed that cohesin contributes to CTCF-mediated transcriptional insulation.

Between 2004 and 2009, Peters coordinated the European Union-funded MitoCheck project, which aimed to identify genes involved in mitosis. Between 2010 and 2015, he headed its successor, MitoSys, an interdisciplinary project investigating how genes and proteins orchestrate mitosis in human cells. MitoSys was accompanied by Lens on Life, an art project and exhibition exploring cell division through collaborations between artists and scientists.

== Awards and honours ==
- 2025 Decoration of Honour for Services to the Republic of Austria.
- 2025 External Scientific Member of the Max Planck Institute of Biochemistry, Martinsried.
- 2022 European Research Council (ERC) Proof of Concept Grant.
- 2021 ERC Advanced Grant.
- 2017 Adjunct Professor of the Medical University of Vienna.
- 2016 ERC Advanced Grant.
- 2014 Full Member of the Austrian Academy of Sciences.
- 2014 Elected member of the Academia Europaea.
- 2012 Corresponding Member of the Austrian Academy of Sciences.
- 2011 Wittgenstein Award.
- 2007 Binder Innovation Prize of the German Society for Cell Biology.
- 2005 Boehringer Ingelheim R&D Award.
- 2002 Novartis Research Prize for Biology.
- 2002 Elected member of the European Molecular Biology Organization (EMBO).
- 2001 Roche Molecular Biochemicals Research Prize for Cell Biology.
- 2001 EMBO Young Investigator Programme.
- 1994 Falcon Prize of the German Society for Cell Biology.
- 1992 Junior Scientist Award, Society for Promotion of Molecular Biology.
- 1994–1996 EMBO long-term postdoctoral fellowship.
- 1992–1993 Postdoctoral fellowship, German Cancer Research Center (DKFZ).
- 1983–1988 Student fellowship, German Academic Scholarship Foundation.

== Selected publications ==
- Davidson IF, Bauer B, Goetz D, Tang W, Wutz G, Peters JM (2019). "DNA loop extrusion by human cohesin". Science. 366: 1338–1345. doi:10.1126/science.aaz3418.
- Wutz G, Várnai C, Nagasaka K, Cisneros DA, Stocsits RR, Tang W, Schoenfelder S, Jessberger G, Muhar M, Hossain MJ, Walther N, Koch B, Kueblbeck M, Ellenberg J, Zuber J, Fraser P, Peters JM (2017). "Topologically associating domains and chromatin loops depend on cohesin and are regulated by CTCF, WAPL, and PDS5 proteins". The EMBO Journal. 36: 3573–3599. doi:10.15252/embj.201798004. PMC 5730888.
- Tedeschi A, Wutz G, Huet S, Jaritz M, Wuensche A, Schirghuber E, Davidson IF, Tang W, Cisneros DA, Bhaskara V, Nishiyama T, Vaziri A, Wutz A, Ellenberg J, Peters JM (2013). "Wapl is an essential regulator of chromatin structure and chromosome segregation". Nature. 501: 564–568. doi:10.1038/nature12471. PMC 6080692.
- Wendt KS, Yoshida K, Itoh T, Bando M, Koch B, Schirghuber E, Tsutsumi S, Nagae G, Ishihara K, Mishiro T, Yahata K, Imamoto F, Aburatani H, Nakao M, Imamoto N, Maeshima K, Shirahige K, Peters JM (2008). "Cohesin mediates transcriptional insulation by CCCTC-binding factor". Nature. 451: 796–801. doi:10.1038/nature06634.
- Kueng S, Hegemann B, Peters BH, Lipp JJ, Schleiffer A, Mechtler K, Peters JM (2006). "Wapl controls the dynamic association of cohesin with chromatin". Cell. 127: 955–967. doi:10.1016/j.cell.2006.09.040.
