= Alexander Stark =

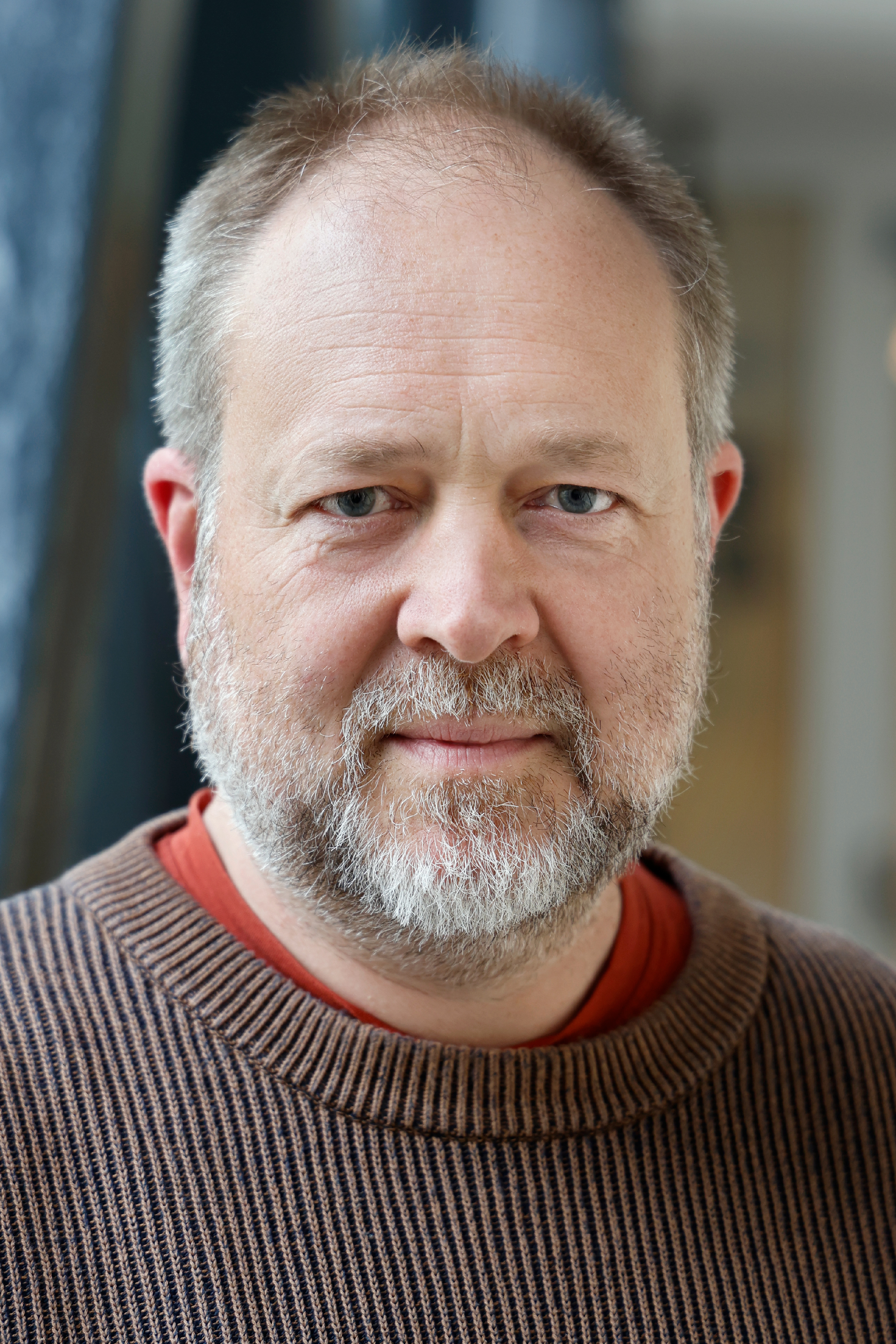
- Education: University of Tübingen (diploma); European Molecular Biology Laboratory, University of Cologne (PhD)
- Scientific career
- Fields: gene expression in development, transcription
- Workplaces: Research Institute of Molecular Pathology; Broad Institute of MIT and Harvard University; European Molecular Biology Laboratory
- Doctoral advisor: Robert B. Russell
- Website: www.imp.ac.at/groups/alexander-stark/

Alexander Stark (born September 1974) is a biochemist and computational biologist working on the regulation of gene expression in development. He is a senior scientist at the Research Institute of Molecular Pathology (IMP) at the Vienna Biocenter and adjunct professor of the Medical University of Vienna.

== Early life and education ==
Alexander Stark grew up in Baden-Württemberg, Germany. He studied biochemistry at the University of Tübingen, and graduated with a diploma in biochemistry in 2000. In 2001, he started to do research for doctoral studies in the group of Robert B. (Rob) Russell at the European Molecular Biology Laboratory (EMBL) and obtained his doctorate from the University of Cologne in 2004. Stark remained at EMBL for one more year as a bridging postdoc.

== Career ==
In 2005, Stark became a postdoctoral researcher in the groups of Eric S. Lander and Manolis Kellis at the Broad Institute of MIT and Harvard University and the MIT Computer Science and Artificial Intelligence Laboratory (CSAIL) in Boston, USA. His postdoctoral research was supported by EMBO, HFSP, and the Schering Foundation.

In 2008, Stark became group leader at the Research Institute of Molecular Pathology (IMP) in Vienna and was promoted to senior scientist in 2015. He was made adjunct professor of the Medical University of Vienna in 2017.

== Research ==
Alexander Stark studies the regulation of gene expression in response to developmental or environmental stimuli to learn how transcription and transcriptional networks define cellular and developmental programs.

More specifically, he investigates how transcription is regulated at the level of enhancer and core-promoter DNA elements, and the transcription factor and cofactor proteins that mediate transcription activation. He uses genome-wide functional assays, bioinformatics, and mass spectrometry, and develops innovative reporter assays (such as STARR-seq) that provide direct functional readouts.

Some of Stark's most cited publications include Principles of MicroRNA- Target Recognition, bantam Encodes a Developmentally Regulated microRNA that Controls Cell Proliferation and Regulates the Proapoptotic Gene hid in Drosophila, and Histone modifications at human enhancers reflect global cell-type-specific gene expression.

Stark's research also contributed to the design of synthetic enhancers that function in a tissue-specific manner in flies and mice.

== Awards and achievements ==
- 2015: Consolidator grant of the ERC in 2015.
- 2015: Elected member of EMBO
- 2014: "Highly cited researcher" by Thomson Reuters
- 2012: EMBO Young Investigator
- 2009: Starting grant of the European Research Council (ERC)

Stark is on the editorial boards of Genes & Development and Molecular Systems Biology.

== Selected publications ==
- Chen, S; Loubiere, V; Hollingsworth, EW; Murakami, K; Mandlburger, N; Jacinto, SH; Dizehchi, A; Schreiber, J; Kvon, EZ; Stark, A (25 August 2026). "Predictive design of tissue-specific mammalian enhancers that function in the mouse embryo". Nature Genetics. 58 (9): 2129–2133. doi:10.1038/s41588-026-02729-1. PMID 41497587.
- de Almeida, BP; Schaub, C; Pagani, M; Secchia, S; Furlong, EEM; Stark, A (12 December 2023). "Targeted design of synthetic enhancers for selected tissues in the Drosophila embryo". Nature. 626 (7997): 207–211. doi:10.1038/s41586-023-06905-9. PMC 10830412.
- de Almeida, BP; Reiter, F; Pagani, M; Stark, A (May 2022). "DeepSTARR predicts enhancer activity from DNA sequence and enables the de novo design of synthetic enhancers". Nature Genetics. 54 (5): 613–624. doi:10.1038/s41588-022-01048-5.
- Kvon, EZ; Kazmar, T; Stampfel, G; Yáñez-Cuna, JO; Pagani, M; Schernhuber, K; Dickson, BJ; Stark, A (August 2014). "Genome-scale functional characterization of Drosophila developmental enhancers in vivo". Nature. 512 (7512): 91–95. doi:10.1038/nature13395.
- Arnold, CD; Gerlach, D; Stelzer, C; Boryń, ŁM; Rath, M; Stark, A (1 March 2013). "Genome-wide quantitative enhancer activity maps identified by STARR-seq". Science. 339 (6123): 1074–1077. doi:10.1126/science.1232542.
