= Catherine Abbott =

British professor of molecular genetics

- Education: University of Reading
- Spouse: Sir Adrian Bird (m. 1993)
- Scientific career
- Fields: Molecular genetics
- Workplaces: University of Edinburgh; University College London

Catherine Abbott, Lady Bird is a professor of molecular genetics at the University of Edinburgh.

== Education ==
Abbott completed her BSc degree in 1983 at the University of Reading. She earned a PhD in biochemical genetics from the University of Reading and the Medical Research Council from Harwell in 1987.

== Research ==
After her doctorate, Abbott joined University College London as a postdoctoral researcher working on mouse models of human diseases at a molecular level. She moved to Edinburgh to work in the human genetics unit of the Medical Research Council and then as a tenured academic at the university.

Abbott is a geneticist who studies a strain of mice that develop an early onset of motor neuron disease. The gene that was mutated in the strain of mice was eEF1A2, which is also present in neurodevelopmental disorders. She is also interested in what makes motor neurones particularly vulnerable to stress in comparison to other cells in the body, with a focus on making them more robust. Abbott is developing new models of motor neuron disease to identify new targets for treatments.

The eEF1A2 gene is mutated in some people with autism and epilepsy, and Abbott's lab are modelling the changes to find out why. She keeps a lab blog, where they document the important gene mutations they have discovered so far. She is interested in CRISPR/Cas Tools for gene editing.

Abbott is a campaigns for diversity within the sciences, and has led the Athena SWAN applications at the University of Edinburgh. She is a member of the British Neuroscience Association. She is on the panel for the funding panel for the National Centre for the Replacement, Refinement and Reduction of Animals in Research. She is the Associate Editor for ACS journal Chemical Neuroscience.
