= Hartmut Beug =

German cancer biologist

- Born: Hartmut Beug
- Education: University of Freiburg (MSc); University of Tübingen (PhD)
- Spouse: Margrit Beug
- Awards: Josef Steiner Cancer Research Foundation prize (1988); EMBO Member (1983)
- Scientific career
- Fields: oncology, molecular biology
- Workplaces: Max Planck Institute for Developmental Biology; European Molecular Biology Laboratory (EMBL); Research Institute of Molecular Pathology
- Thesis: (1973)
- Doctoral advisor: Günther Gerisch

Hartmut Beug (1945–2011) was a German cancer biologist who studied how groups of oncogenes interact to lead to the development and spread of cancer. Shortly before his death, a foundation was set up in his and his wife’s name to support collaboration among young scientists and their studies in the field of metastasis.

== Early life and education ==
Hartmut Beug was born in Hamburg, Germany in 1945, and raised there. From 1964 to 1971, he studied biology at the University of Freiburg. From 1971 to 1973, he studied the protist Dictyostelium in the frame of his PhD studies in Günther Gerisch’s lab at the Friedrich-Miescher-Laboratorium of the Max Planck Society in Tübingen.

== Career and research ==
From 1973 to 1978, Hartmut Beug was a postdoctoral researcher at the Max Planck Institut für Virusforschung (today’s Max Planck Institute for Developmental Biology) in the lab of Thomas Graf in Tübingen.

Beug followed Thomas Graf to the Deutsches Krebsforschungszentrum (DKFZ) in Heidelberg in 1978 to continue his postdoc, and to the European Molecular Biology Laboratory (EMBL) in 1983. He was elected a member of the European Molecular Biology Organisation (EMBO) the same year. At EMBL, Beug was a staff scientist associated with Thomas Graf’s lab until 1988.

In 1988, he became senior scientist at the Research Institute of Molecular Pathology (IMP) in Vienna. The same year he was awarded the Josef Steiner Cancer Research Foundation prize, jointly with Mariano Barbacid and Thomas Graf.

In 1999, Beug was appointed a professor at the University of Vienna. He retired from his position at the IMP in 2010 and continued to conduct some research at the faculty of Veterinary Medicine in Vienna until his death in 2011.

Hartmut Beug’s work focussed on different aspects of formation and propagation of cancer. He demonstrated critical roles for oncogene cooperativity, for example that the distinction between progenitor cell expansion and maturation relies on cooperation between endogenous signalling and transcription pathways.

In the 1970s and 1980s, Beug identified new pairs of oncogenes in avian oncogenic viruses. He was later among the first scientists to propose that the transformation of hematopoietic cell into cancer cells requires the cooperation of growth factor signaling pathways and the deregulation of transcription.

At the IMP, Beug also studied the mechanisms that drive metastasis of breast cancer cells. He showed how a cooperation of deregulated genes is required for epithelial-mesenchymal transition and metastatic potential of cancer cells.

== Beug Foundation for Metastasis Research ==
In the months before his death, Beug and his wife established the “Hartmut and Margrit Beug Foundation for Metastasis Research”. The Beug Foundation for Metastasis Research supports basic research on the mechanisms that underlie cancer metastasis, and promotes the cooperation between basic and pharmaceutical research to develop novel therapies.

Biannually since 2013, the Beug Foundation awards the Metastasis Research Prize to one or more scientists with an original idea or project for cancer metastasis research. Through this prize, the foundation aims to offer a financial seed to obtain the first preliminary data that are required to convince funding institutions to further support this project.
