= List of fellows of the Royal Society elected in 1989 =

Fellows of the Royal Society elected in 1989.

== Fellows ==
1. Brian David Outram Anderson
2. Kenneth Dawson Bagshawe
3. Sir John Macleod Ball
4. Adrian Peter Bird
5. Roger David Blandford
6. Arthur James Cain (1921–1999)
7. Mark Child
8. Alwyn George Davies
9. Peter Goddard
10. Michael Boris Green
11. Sir Robert Brian Heap
12. Geoffrey Frederick Hewitt
13. Derek Hull
14. Julian Hunt, Baron Hunt of Chesterton
15. Richard Hynes
16. Michael N. G. James
17. Francis Patrick Kelly
18. Sir John Hartley Lawton
19. Gilbert George Lonzarich
20. Andrew David McLachlan
21. Michael Arthur Moore
22. Kim Ashley Nasmyth
23. Sir Paul Nurse
24. Geoffrey Alan Parker
25. Robert Ladislav Parker
26. Sir Richard Peto
27. Warren Richard Roper
28. John Martin Rowell
29. Ian John Russell
30. Edward Shackleton Lord Edward Arthur Alexander (1911–1994) (Statute)
31. John Philip Simons
32. Charles Roger Slack
33. Arthur Marshall Stoneham (1940–2011)
34. Roger Christopher Thomas
35. Anne Marie Treisman
36. Kenneth Wade
37. Patrick David Wall (1925–2001)
38. Robert Gordon Webster
39. Thomas Summers West (1927–2010)
40. Sir Andrew John Wiles
41. Ian Robert Young

== Foreign members ==
1. Nicole Marthe Le Douarin
2. Paul Erdős (1913–1996)
3. Kenichi Fukui (1918–1998)
4. Edward B Lewis (1918–2004)
5. Barbara McClintock (1902–1992)
6. Edward Mills Purcell (1912–1997)
