= Clemens Plaschka =

Austrian molecular biologist

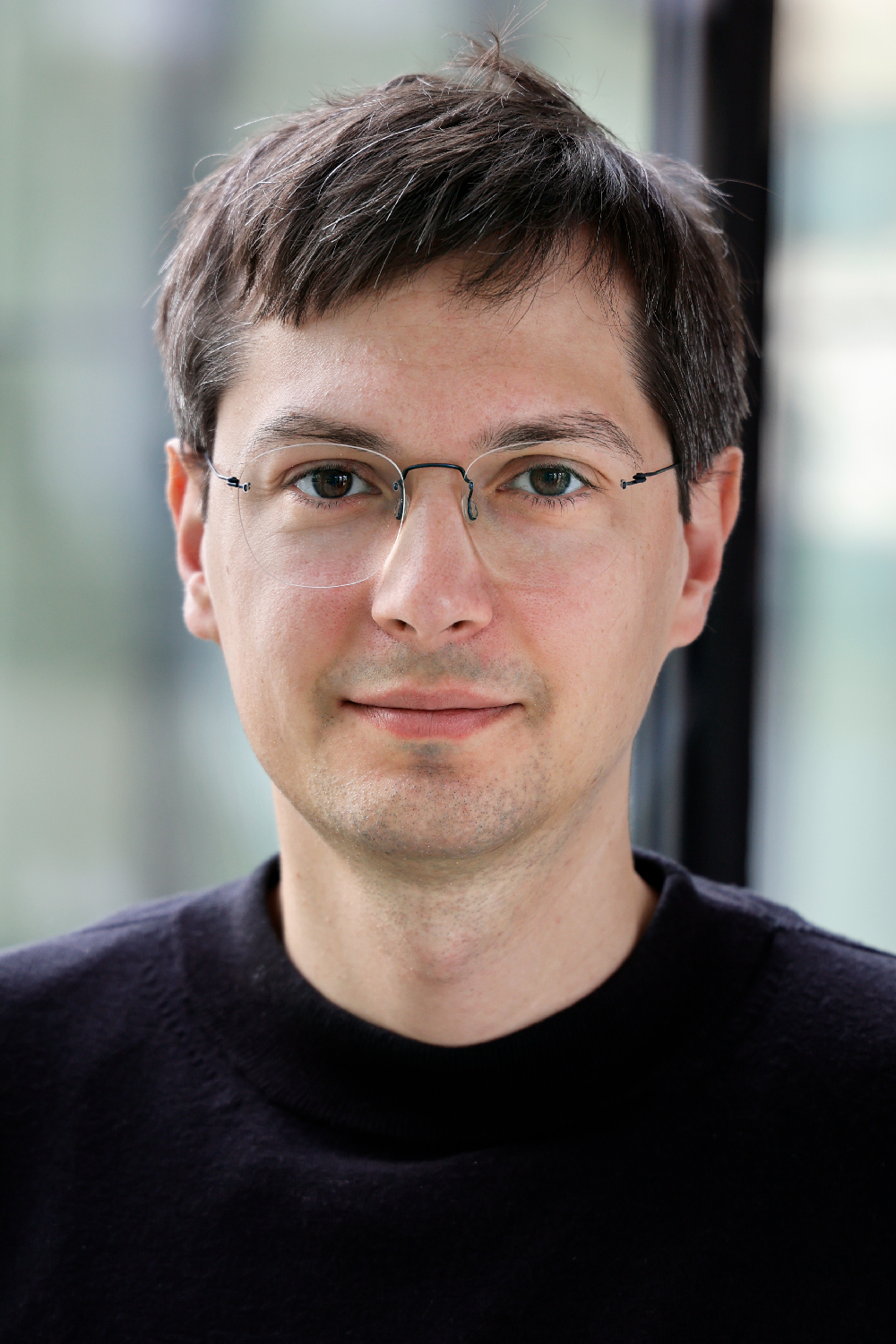
- Born: 1989 (age 36–37); Vienna, Austria
- Citizenship: Austrian
- Education: Imperial College London; LMU Munich
- Known for: RNA maturation
- Awards: Eppendorf Award for Young European Investigators, EMBO Member
- Scientific career
- Fields: Molecular biology
- Workplaces: Research Institute of Molecular Pathology (IMP)
- Doctoral advisor: Patrick Cramer
- Website: https://www.imp.ac.at/groups/clemens-plaschka

Clemens Plaschka (born 1989) is an Austrian molecular biologist and Senior Group Leader at the Research Institute of Molecular Pathology (IMP) at the Vienna Biocenter. His research focuses on gene expression, particularly the biogenesis, processing, and nuclear export of messenger RNA (mRNA). His work integrates structural biology, biochemistry, genomics, and imaging approaches to study the molecular machines and mechanisms responsible for making RNA, including the spliceosome and assemblies involved in mRNA nuclear export.

== Early life and education ==
Plaschka was born and raised in Vienna, Austria. He studied biochemistry at Imperial College London. He carried out doctoral research at LMU Munich and the Max Planck Institute for Biophysical Chemistry in Göttingen in the laboratory of Patrick Cramer, where he investigated the mechanisms of gene activation and transcription.

He later carried out postdoctoral research at the MRC Laboratory of Molecular Biology in Cambridge in the group of Kiyoshi Nagai. There he investigated the mechanisms of RNA splicing and contributed to structural studies of the spliceosome, the large ribonucleoprotein complex responsible for removing introns from precursor mRNA.

== Research and career ==
In 2018, Plaschka established an independent research group at the Research Institute of Molecular Pathology (IMP) in Vienna. His laboratory studies the production, processing, quality control, and nuclear export of mRNA in eukaryotic cells, processes essential for gene expression.

The Plaschka group uses methods including cryo-electron microscopy, X-ray crystallography, endogenous purification, biochemical reconstitution, next-generation sequencing, mass spectrometry, and super-resolution microscopy to examine the macromolecular complexes involved in RNA maturation. Plaschka and his collaborators have made important contributions to mechanistic studies of splicing and the packaging and export of mRNA from the nucleus. They have also contributed to research indicating that mRNAs adopt compact ultrastructures prior to nuclear export, contributing to models of mRNA maturation and quality control.

In 2025, Plaschka was promoted to Senior Group Leader at the IMP.

== Awards and honours ==
- 2025: Member, European Molecular Biology Organization
- 2025: European Research Council (ERC) Consolidator Grant
- 2024: Member, Young Academy of the Austrian Academy of Sciences
- 2024: Eppendorf Award for Young European Investigators
- 2022: EMBO Young Investigator Programme
- 2020: European Research Council (ERC) Starting Grant
- 2016: European Molecular Biology Organization (EMBO) Long-Term Fellowship
- 2015: Otto Hahn Medal of the Max Planck Society
- 2015: Kulturpreis Bayern

== Selected publications ==
- Boreikaite, V. et al. “Mechanism of spliceosome termination.” Nature (2026).
- Bugai, A. et al. “Molecular basis of polyadenylated RNA fate determination in the nucleus.” Nature (2026).
- Hohmann, U. et al. “An ATP-gated molecular switch orchestrates human messenger RNA export.” Nature 649, 1042–1050 (2026).
- Vorländer, M. K. et al. “Mechanism for the initiation of spliceosome disassembly.” Nature 632, 443–450 (2024).
- Pacheco-Fiallos, B. et al. “mRNA recognition and packaging by the human transcription-export complex.” Nature 616, 828–835 (2023).
- Plaschka, C.; Lin, P.-C.; Charenton, C.; Nagai, K. “Prespliceosome structure provides insight into spliceosome assembly and regulation.” Nature 558, 419–422 (2018).
- Plaschka, C.; Lin, P.-C.; Nagai, K. “Structure of a pre-catalytic spliceosome.” Nature 546, 617–621 (2017).
