= Angelika Amon =

Austrian American academic molecular and cell biologist (1967–2020)

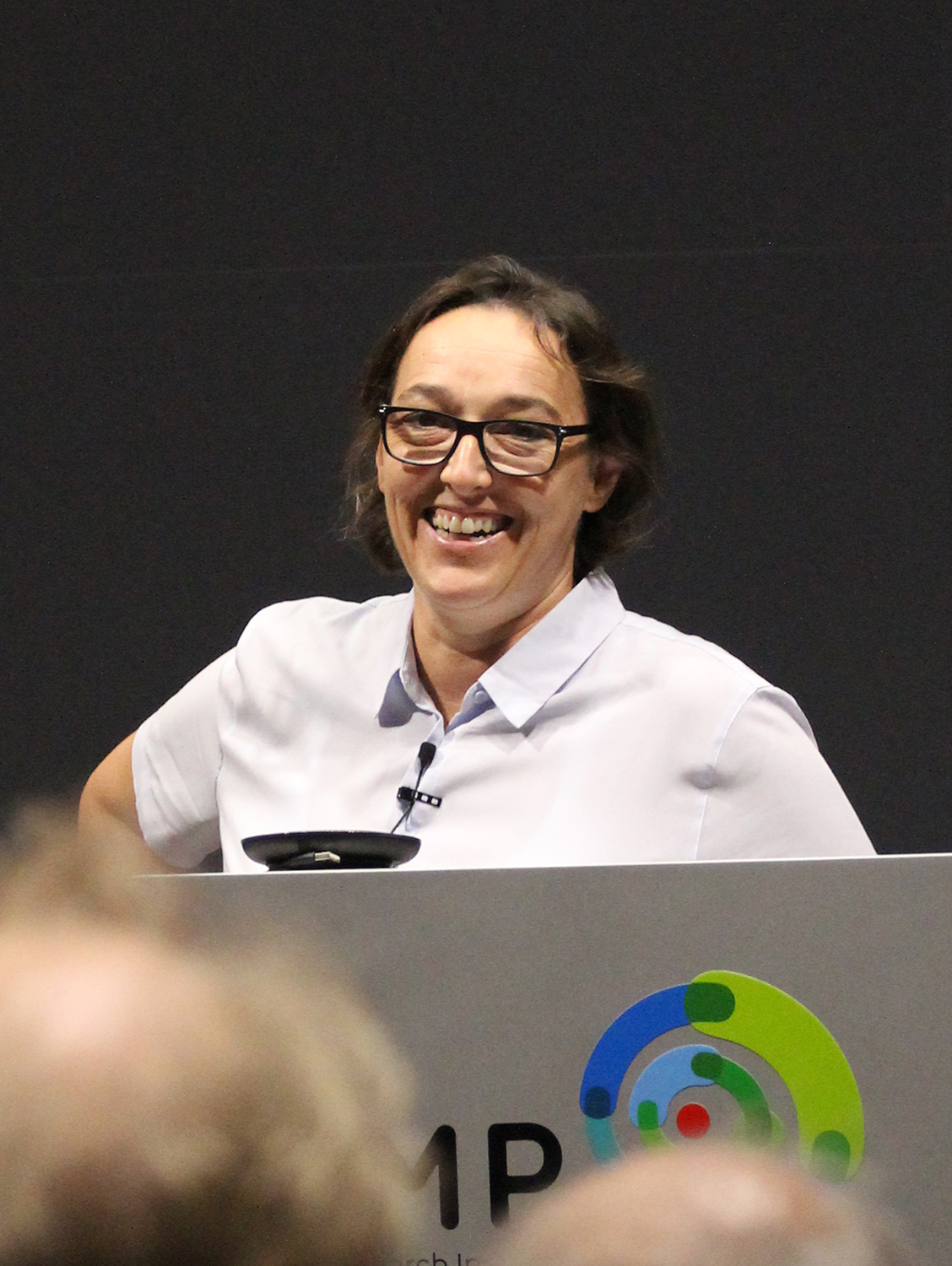
- Amon in October 2017
- Born: January 10, 1967; Vienna, Austria
- Died: October 29, 2020 (aged 53)
- Citizenship: Austria & United States
- Education: University of Vienna (B.S., Ph.D.
- Known for: Chromosome duplication and cell division
- Awards: 1998 Presidential Early Career Award for Scientists and Engineers; 2003 Alan T. Waterman Award; 2003 Eli Lilly and Company-Elanco Research Award; 2007 Paul Marks Prize for Cancer Research (shared with Todd Golub and Gregory Hannon); 2008 NAS Award in Molecular Biology; 2013 Ernst Jung Prize; 2018 Vanderbilt Prize in Biomedical Science; 2019 Breakthrough Prize in Life Sciences; 2019 Vilcek Prize; 2020 HFSP Nakasone Award
- Scientific career
- Workplaces: Whitehead Institute (1994–1999); Massachusetts Institute of Technology (1999–2020); Research Institute of Molecular Pathology
- Doctoral advisor: Kim Nasmyth

Angelika Amon (January 10, 1967 – October 29, 2020) was an Austrian American molecular and cell biologist, and the Kathleen and Curtis Marble Professor in Cancer Research at the Massachusetts Institute of Technology (MIT) in Cambridge, Massachusetts, United States. Amon's research centered on how chromosomes are regulated, duplicated, and partitioned in the cell cycle. Amon was elected to the American Academy of Arts and Sciences in 2017.

== Early life ==
Amon was born and raised in Vienna, Austria. She displayed an early interest in plant and animal biology as a child, keeping a notebook full of newspaper clippings, and was motivated to study biology after learning about Mendelian genetics and seeing time-lapse micrographs of the division of plant cells in middle school.

Amon received an undergraduate degree in biology from the University of Vienna. She continued her doctoral work there beginning in 1989 under a newly hired Kim Nasmyth at the Research Institute of Molecular Pathology (IMP), receiving a PhD in 1993. Amon left Austria for the United States in 1994, joining the Whitehead Institute in Cambridge, Massachusetts as a postdoctoral researcher. She was named a Whitehead Fellow in 1996, which allowed her to start her own laboratory at the Institute.

== Career ==
Amon's independent work at the Whitehead Institute led directly to her securing a faculty appointment at the Koch Institute for Integrative Cancer Research at MIT in 1999, the same year she received the Presidential Early Career Award and was named a Howard S. and Linda B. Stern Career Development Assistant Professor. Amon became an associate investigator for the Howard Hughes Medical Institute in 2000, and was promoted to full professor at MIT in 2007; she had earlier achieved tenure as an assistant professor.

Amon was listed as a member of the Editorial Board for Current Biology in 2016, but no longer appears in this position as of 2019. She served on the Scientific Advisory Board of the Research Institute of Molecular Pathology (IMP) from 2009 to 2019.

Amon was elected to the American Academy of Arts and Sciences in 2017, by which time she had been named the Kathleen and Curtis Marble Professor of Cancer Research at MIT. She was conferred the Vilcek Prize two years later, in recognition of her as one who had "made extraordinary contributions to their fields" while being a foreign-born researcher in the United States.

== Personal life ==
Amon was married to Johannes Weis. Together, they had two daughters (Theresa and Clara). She died on October 29, 2020. She was 53, and suffered from ovarian cancer in the two-and-a-half years leading up to her death.

== Research ==
Amon's research has investigated how cells control and organize the segregation of their chromosomes during cell division. More specifically, her research examines the regulation of exit from mitosis, the regulation of the meiotic cell cycle, and effects of aneuploidy on normal physiology and tumorigenesis.

As a student under Nasmyth, Amon made significant discoveries related to the biosynthesis and breakdown of cyclins during the cell cycle. More specifically, she demonstrated that CDC28 protein kinase is not required for the metaphase to anaphase transition and CLB2 proteolysis continues until reactivation of CDC28 toward the end of G1.

During her time as a post-doctoral fellow at the Whitehead Institute in the 1990s, Amon turned from yeast to fruit flies in the laboratory of Ruth Lehmann, though she found fruit flies to be a far less attractive model than yeast; "once you had worked with yeast, you were spoiled", she said.

The Amon lab primarily investigates yeast (Saccharomyces cerevisiae) as a model for understanding the controls that govern cell-cycle progression and received an Early Career Award grant, a PECAS award, from he NIH for this work in 1998. The PECAS is "the highest honor bestowed by the United States government on young professionals in the early stages of their independent research careers". As a Whitehead Fellow, her team discovered that CDC20 plays a crucial role in cell division. Her Whitehead team identified an interaction between phosphatase and CDC14 which initiates the exit of cells from mitosis to the G1 phase. Amon's team demonstrated that CDC20 is the target protein in the spindle checkpoint during mitosis.

Amon's more recent work has investigated the regulation of chromosome segregation and how chromosomes are accurately transmitted to gametes in meiosis by examining gene regulatory networks. She identified two regulatory networks (FEAR and MEN) that promote the release of CDC14 which have the potential to identify the mechanisms that control the final stages of the mitotic cell cycle.

Her research group recently created haploid yeast cells containing extra copies of chromosomes and discovered that these aneuploid strains elicit phenotypes independent of the identity of the additional chromosome such as defects in cell cycle progression, increased energy demands, and interference with protein biosynthesis. Amon has also examined trisomy in the mouse as a model of mammalian cell growth and physiology and demonstrated that mammalian aneuploidy results in a stress response analogous to yeast aneuploidy. Amon's aneuploidy research has potential applications to cancer research. She found that aneuploidy can interfere with a cell's normal DNA repair mechanisms, allowing mutations to accumulate in tumor cells.

== Awards and honors ==
- 1998 Presidential Early Career Award for Scientists and Engineers
- 2003 Alan T. Waterman Award
- 2003 Eli Lilly and Company-Elanco Research Award
- 2007 Paul Marks Prize for Cancer Research (shared with Todd R. Golub and Gregory J. Hannon)
- 2008 NAS Award in Molecular Biology
- 2013 Ernst Jung Prize
- 2018 Vanderbilt Prize in Biomedical Science
- 2019 Breakthrough Prize in Life Sciences
- 2019 Vilcek Prize
- 2020 HFSP Nakasone Award
