= Michael Grunstein =

Biologist and academic (1946–2024)

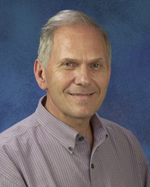
- Grunstein in 2006
- Born: August 30, 1946; Romania
- Died: February 18, 2024 (aged 77)
- Education: McGill University; University of Edinburgh
- Awards: Massry Prize (2003), Albert Lasker Award for Basic Medical Research (2018), Albany Medical Center Prize (2022)
- Scientific career
- Fields: Biological Chemistry
- Workplaces: David Geffen School of Medicine at UCLA

Michael Grunstein (August 30, 1946 – February 18, 2024) was a Romanian-born American biologist and academic who was a Distinguished Professor Emeritus of Biological Chemistry at the David Geffen School of Medicine at UCLA.

The only surviving child of Holocaust survivors, he obtained his Bachelor of Science degree from McGill University in Montreal, and his PhD from the University of Edinburgh, Scotland in the lab of Max Birnstiel. He did his post-doctoral training at Stanford University in Palo Alto, California, where he invented the colony hybridization screening technique for recombinant DNAs in David Hogness' laboratory.

After coming to UCLA in 1975, Grunstein pioneered the genetic analysis of histones in yeast and showed for the first time that histones are regulators of gene activity in living cells. confirming the previous demonstration of the regulation of transcription by histones in vitro His laboratory's studies provided inspiration for the eukaryotic histone code and underlie the modern study of epigenetics. His work, which "catapulted the field forward", was recognized in 2018 with the Albert Lasker Award for Basic Medical Research.

Grunstein died on February 18, 2024, at the age of 77.

== Honors and awards ==
- 2003 Massry Prize from the Keck School of Medicine, University of Southern California (with Roger Kornberg and C. David Allis).
- April 2008, Grunstein was elected into the National Academy of Sciences.
- 2011 Lewis S. Rosenstiel Award for Distinguished Work in Basic Medical Research (shared with C. David Allis)
- 2016 Gruber Prize in Genetics from The Gruber Foundation (at Yale University) (jointly with C. David Allis)
- 2018 Albert Lasker Award for Basic Medical Research (jointly with C. David Allis)
- 2022 Albany Medical Center Prize (jointly with C. David Allis)

== See also ==
- List of members of the National Academy of sciences
