= Adrian Bird =

British geneticist

Sir Adrian Bird CBE FRS FRSE FMedSci
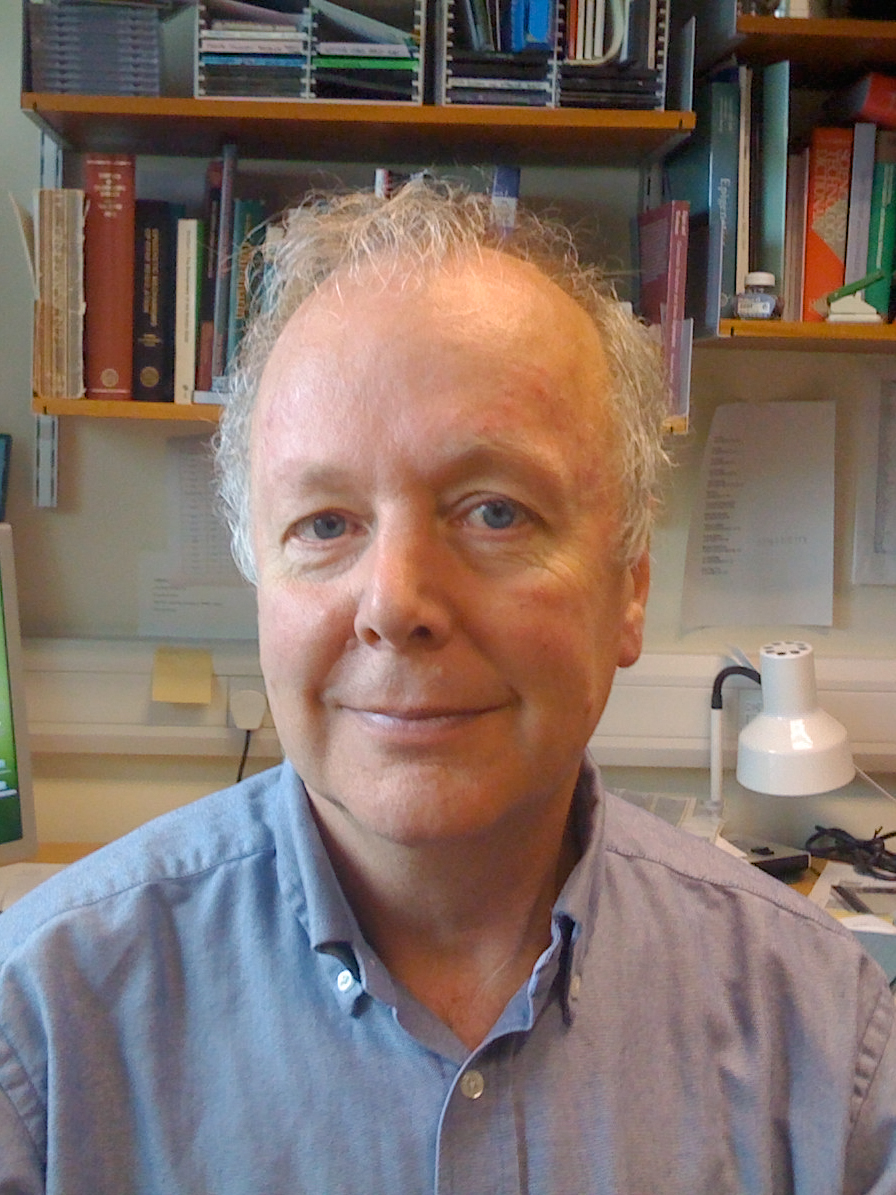
- Born: Adrian Peter Bird; 3 July 1947 (age 79); Rowley Regis, Staffordshire, England
- Education: University of Sussex (BSc); University of Edinburgh (PhD)
- Spouse: Catherine Mary Abbott (m. 1993)
- Awards: Louis-Jeantet Prize for Medicine (1999); Gabor Medal (1999); Grand Prix Charles-Leopold Mayer (2008); Gairdner Award (2011); GlaxoSmithKline Prize (2012); BBVA Foundation Frontiers of Knowledge Award (2013); Knight Bachelor (2014); Shaw Prize in Life Science and Medicine (2016); Buchanan Medal (2018); Brain Prize (2020); Louisa Gross Horwitz Prize (2026)
- Scientific career
- Fields: Genetics; Epigenetics; CpG sites; DNA methylation; MECP2
- Workplaces: University of Edinburgh; Research Institute of Molecular Pathology; Yale University; University of Zurich; Wellcome Trust Sanger Institute
- Thesis: The cytology and biochemistry of DNA amplification in the ovary of Xenopus laevis (1972)
- Doctoral advisor: Max Birnstiel
- Doctoral students: Rob Klose
- Website: birdlab.bio.ed.ac.uk

Sir Adrian Peter Bird (born 3 July 1947) is a British geneticist and Buchanan Professor of Genetics at the University of Edinburgh. Bird has spent much of his academic career in Edinburgh, from receiving his PhD in 1970 to working at the MRC Mammalian Genome Unit and later serving as director of the Wellcome Trust Centre for Cell Biology. His research focuses on understanding DNA methylation and CpG islands, and their role in diseases such as Rett syndrome.

== Education and early life ==
Bird was born in Rowley Regis near Wolverhampton, England, but from age 4 lived in the town of Kidderminster, near Birmingham. He attended a grammar school in Hartlebury, achieving grades CCD for his A-level results. Whilst at school, Bird played cricket and hockey for a local team. Bird received his PhD from the University of Edinburgh in 1970 for research supervised by Max Birnstiel, following undergraduate study of Biochemistry at the University of Sussex.

== Career and research ==
Following his PhD, Bird went on to postdoctoral research positions, first at Yale University with Joseph G. Gall, and then at the University of Zurich before returning to Edinburgh in 1975 to work at the MRC Mammalian Genome Unit, where he would stay for 11 years. It was here that Bird, along with Edwin Southern, mapped the methylation status of CpG dinucleotides along ribosomal RNA in the African clawed frog. From 1987 to 1990 Bird continued his research at the Research Institute of Molecular Pathology in Vienna.

In 1990, Adrian Bird became Buchanan Professor of Genetics at the University of Edinburgh. He helped create the Wellcome Trust Centre for Cell Biology, also in Edinburgh, and served as its director from 1999 until 2011, when he was succeeded by David Tollervey. From 2000 to 2010, he was also a governor of the Wellcome Trust, serving as deputy chairman during the latter three years.

Bird is a trustee of the charitable organisation Cancer Research UK and of the Rett Syndrome Research Trust. He also serves as a Governance Board Member of the Edinburgh Cancer Research Centre.

Bird's research has focused on CpG islands and their associated binding-factor MeCP2. He led the team which first identified CpG islands—originally named "HpaII tiny fragments"—in vertebrate genomes. These are short genomic regions with a high density of CpG dinucleotides, and are commonly found in an unmethylated state within or nearby to an active gene's promoter.

Bird's group discovered that the MeCP2 protein binds specifically to methylated CpG sites, and further that disruption of this interaction causes the autism spectrum disorder Rett syndrome. The Bird lab also implicated nuclear receptor co-repressor 1 as an important binding partner in the MeCP2/methyl-CpG interaction.

In 2007, the Bird laboratory published a paper in the journal Science describing a proof-of-principle that the murine equivalent of Rett syndrome could be successfully reversed in laboratory mice. This was accomplished by reintroducing a functional MeCP2 gene and proved successful even when the condition was at an advanced stage, hinting at the possibility of a gene therapy approach to curing the human disease in the future.

=== Awards and honours ===
Bird was elected a Fellow of the Royal Society (FRS) in 1989, his nomination read:

Adrian Bird is the leading authority on DNA methylation in animal cells. He demonstrated a rolling circle mechanism for ribosomal gene amplification. He showed that DNA methylation sites can be mapped using restriction enzymes and thus showed semi-conservative copying of methylation patterns. He showed convincingly that the doublet CpG is a source of mutation in vertebrates which led to the use of 'GpG' restriction enzymes to detect polymorphisms linked to genetic diseases. He discovered unmethylated 'HTF' islands at the 5i ends of housekeeping genes. This discovery has allowed new strategies for mapping and identifying genes and it has allowed Bird to propose that the unmethylated HTF islands identify DNA sequences to be kept constantly available within the nucleus.

Bird was awarded the Gabor Medal in 1999 "in recognition of his pioneering work in the study of global mechanisms by which transcription of the mammalian genome is regulated and for his exploration into the molecular basis of fundamental biological mechanisms, particularly his development of ways of analysing methylation patterns of eukaryotic DNA using endonucleases and the discovery of and continued research into a new class of DNA sequences found in all vertebrates". He received the Louis-Jeantet Prize for Medicine in the same year, and was made a Commander of the Order of the British Empire in the Queen's Birthday Honours in 2005.

In 2011, he was a recipient of the Gairdner Foundation International Award, "for his pioneering discoveries on DNA methylation and its role in gene expression." The following year Bird won the 2012 GlaxoSmithKline Prize. In 2013, he was named a Thomson Reuters Citation Laureate and received the 2013 BBVA Foundation Frontiers of Knowledge Award in Biomedicine "for his discoveries in the field of epigenetics".

In 2013, Bird was tipped as a potential winner of the Nobel Prize in Physiology or Medicine for "fundamental discoveries concerning DNA methylation and gene expression" though the prize later went to James Rothman, Randy Schekman and Thomas C. Südhof.

He was knighted in the 2014 New Year Honours for services to science.

In 2016, he was elected as a foreign associate of the National Academy of Sciences and received the Shaw Prize together with Huda Y. Zoghbi. In 2017 he received the Charles Rudolphe Brupbacher Prize.

He was awarded the Buchanan Medal of the Royal Society in 2018 for his medical discoveries, and elected a Fellow of the Academy of Medical Sciences (FMedSci) in 2001. In 2020 he was awarded the Brain Prize. In 2026 he received the Louisa Gross Horwitz Prize jointly with Huda Zoghbi.

== Personal life ==
Adrian Bird is married to fellow geneticist Cathy Abbott and has four children. At age 66, Bird was quoted as having no plans to retire, saying "we [the research group] are still funded well and our work is still published in journals and as long as that continues, so will I."
