= Meinrad Busslinger =

Swiss researcher

- Born: 30 July 1952 (age 74); Gebenstorf, Switzerland
- Education: ETH Zurich (diploma); University of Zurich (PhD)
- Known for: B cell differentiation
- Awards: Wittgenstein-Preis (2001); EMBO Member (1990)
- Scientific career
- Fields: biochemistry, immunology
- Workplaces: Research Institute of Molecular Pathology; MRC Institute Mill Hill
- Thesis: (1981)
- Doctoral advisor: Max L. Birnstiel
- Website: www.imp.ac.at/groups/meinrad-busslinger/

Meinrad Busslinger (born 30 July 1952) is a biochemist and immunologist, renown for his work on B cells. He was a Senior Scientist and Scientific Deputy Director of the Research Institute of Molecular Pathology (IMP) in Vienna, Austria.

== Early life and education ==
Meinrad Busslinger was born on 30 July 1952 in Gebenstorf, Switzerland. He grew up in the Swiss town of Zug, where he obtained his grammar school education. From 1972 to 1976, he studied natural sciences at the Swiss Federal Institute of Technology (ETH Zurich), where he majored in biochemistry.

During his PhD studies (1976–1981), Busslinger discovered important regulatory elements involved in the transcriptional control of gene expression by investigating the regulation of sea urchin histone genes. He performed his PhD work under the supervision of Max L. Birnstiel at the University of Zurich, from where he received a PhD degree in molecular biology in 1981.

== Career and research ==
In 1981, Busslinger joined the lab of Richard A. Flavell at the MRC Institute Mill Hill in London as a postdoctoral fellow. There, he discovered that a single nucleotide mutation in the first intron of the β-globin gene causes β^{+}-thalassemia and that DNA methylation of promoter sequences prevents gene transcription.

In 1983, Busslinger became a Group Leader at the Institute of Molecular Biology II of the University of Zurich. Here, he discovered a new set of histone genes of the sea urchin and identified a tissue-specific transcription factor (TSAP) as an essential regulator of these genes, which later turned out to be a member of the Paired box (Pax)-containing transcription factor family.

In 1987, Max Birnstiel recruited Busslinger to join the newly founded Research Institute of Molecular Pathology (IMP) in Vienna, Austria, as one of the first Senior Scientists. In 1996, Busslinger was appointed Professor at the University of Vienna. In 2007, he became the IMP's Director of Academic Affairs and, in 2013, Scientific Deputy Director. At the IMP, Busslinger changed his research focus from sea urchin embryogenesis to B cell immunology, which was promoted by the identification of a B-cell-specific transcription factor as a mammalian homologue of the sea urchin regulator TSAP. Protein purification and sequencing identified the B-cell-specific transcription factor as Pax5, and gene inactivation in the mouse defined Pax5 an essential regulator of B cell development. In 1999, Busslinger and his lab described the first molecular definition of a lineage commitment process by identifying Pax5 as the B cell lineage commitment factor that restricts the developmental options of early lymphoid progenitors to the B cell pathway by repressing lineage-inappropriate genes and that simultaneously promotes B cell development by activating B-cell-specific genes. To date, Pax5 is known to function as a guardian of B cell identity for early to late B cell development and to function as an important tumor suppressor or oncoprotein in B cell leukemia. In addition to Pax5, the Busslinger group investigated the role of other important transcription factors, such as E2A, EBF1, Ikaros, and Blimp1, in regulating distinct aspects of B cell development and immunity.

Busslinger also contributed to the current knowledge of how the large locus encoding the immunoglobulin heavy chain (IgH) protein undergoes spatial contraction by looping in early B cell development. This long-range looping induces the juxtaposition of Variable (V) gene segments next to Diversity (D) gene segments, which facilitates V-to-DJ recombination to generate a functional IgH gene. Busslinger identified Pax5 as a critical regulator of IgH locus contraction that facilitates chromatin loop extrusion across the entire locus.

He is a member of the editorial board for Immunity.

== Awards and honours ==
- 2020 Preis der Stadt Wien für Naturwissenschaften
- 2017 European Research Council (ERC) Advanced Grant
- 2015 Honorary member of the Swiss Society for Allergology and Immunology
- 2010 Virchow Medal, Medical Faculty, University of Würzburg
- 2012 European Research Council (ERC) Advanced Grant
- 2009 Full member of the Austrian Academy of Sciences
- 2005 Corresponding member of the Austrian Academy of Sciences
- 2001 Wittgenstein Award
- 2000 Member of the Academia Europaea
- 1990 Member of the European Molecular Biology Organization (EMBO)
- 1981 Postdoctoral fellowship (Swiss National Science Foundation)
