= Tim Clausen =

- Born: Tim Clausen; 12 March 1969 (age 57)
- Education: University of Konstanz (MSc); Max Planck Institute of Biochemistry (PhD)
- Awards: EMBO Young Investigator (2005); EMBO Member (2010)
- Scientific career
- Fields: structural biology, protein folding
- Workplaces: Max Planck Institute of Biochemistry; Research Institute of Molecular Pathology; University of Konstanz
- Thesis: (1997)
- Doctoral advisor: Robert Huber
- Website: clausen.imp.ac.at

Tim Clausen (born 12 March 1969) is a structural biologist and a senior scientist at the Research Institute of Molecular Pathology (IMP) in Vienna, Austria.

== Early life and education ==
Tim Clausen was born in Flensburg, West Germany, in 1969. He did his undergraduate studies in biology at the University of Konstanz from 1988. He graduated with a diploma following research at the lab of Sandro Ghisla in 1994. Following his graduation, Clausen joined the lab of Robert Huber at the Max Planck Institute of Biochemistry in Martinsried for his PhD studies. Clausen obtained his PhD in chemistry summa cum laude in 1997.

== Career ==
In 1997, Tim Clausen became a postdoctoral researcher with Albrecht Messerschmidt at the Max Planck Institute of Biochemistry, leading from 1999 on a small group studying pyridoxal phosphate enzymes. He obtained a lecture qualification (Habilitation) in biochemistry by the University of Konstanz in 2001.

In 2002, Tim Clausen became a group leader in structural biology at the Research Institute of Molecular Pathology (IMP) in Vienna. In 2009, he was promoted to senior scientist.

== Research ==
Tim Clausen studies the protein quality control system that cells evolved, and through which molecular chaperones and proteases monitor the functionality of each protein, thereby reducing the amount of misfolded molecules that may undergo dangerous interactions. Tim Clausen and his lab perform structure-function analyses of several eukaryotic and prokaryotic quality control factors to find novel strategies to combat protein-folding diseases and bacterial pathogenicity.

== Awards and achievements ==
- 2016: European Research Council (ERC) Advanced Grant
- 2010 European Molecular Biology Organization Member
- 2005: EMBO Young Investigator
- 2004: Heinz Mayer-Leibnitz Award of the Deutsche Forschungsgemeinschaft
- 1994: Max Planck Fellowship
