= Barry Dickson =

Australian neurobiologist

Barry J. Dickson
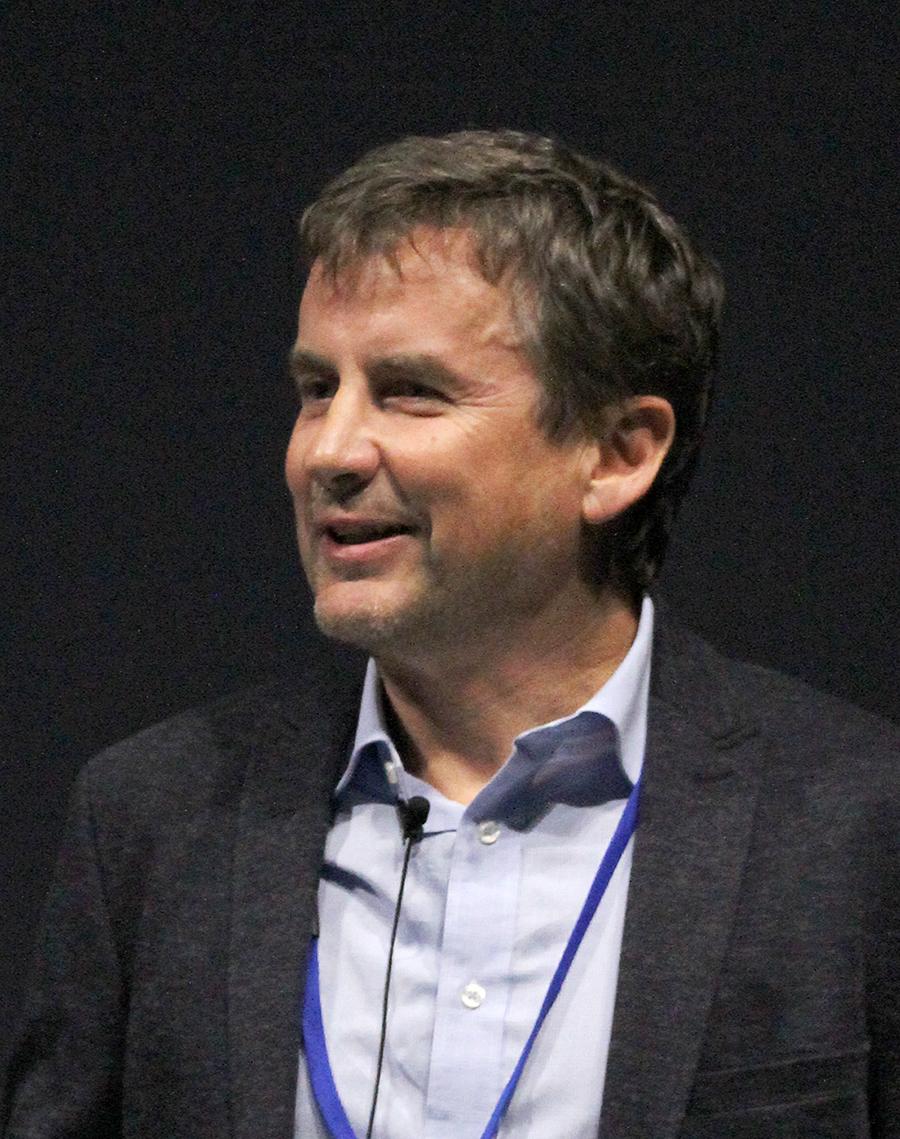
- Barry Dickson in October 2017.
- Born: Barry Dickson; 14 August 1962 (age 64)
- Education: University of Melbourne (BSc); Charles Darwin University (BSc); University of Zurich (PhD)
- Awards: Member of the National Academy of Sciences (2026); Fellow of the Royal Society (2024); Wittgenstein-Preis (2005); AAAS Fellow (2009); EMBO Member (2003)
- Scientific career
- Fields: molecular basis of behavior, neural circuits, neurobiology
- Workplaces: Queensland Brain Institute; Janelia Research Campus; Research Institute of Molecular Pathology; Institute of Molecular Biotechnology
- Thesis: Specificity and Competence in Cell-Cell Interactions: Induction of the R7 Cell Fate in the Developing Eye of Drosophila melanogaster. (1992)
- Doctoral advisor: Ernst Hafen
- Website: www.janelia.org/lab/dickson-lab

Barry J. Dickson FRS (born 14 August 1962) is an Australian neurobiologist who studies the development of neuronal networks in the fruit fly Drosophila melanogaster. Dickson is a group leader at the Queensland Brain Institute, former a group leader at the Janelia Research Campus of the Howard Hughes Medical Institute in Loudoun County, Virginia and a former scientific director of the Research Institute of Molecular Pathology (IMP) in Vienna, Austria.

== Early life and education ==
Barry Dickson was born in Melbourne, and studied mathematics, computer science and genetics at the University of Melbourne. He received his first bachelor of science degree in 1984. Until 1986, Dickson worked as a research assistant at the epidemiology unit at the University of Melbourne and at the Menzies School of Health Research in Darwin. He received a second bachelor of science with honors in 1987 for his thesis about “Interactions between multiple operator sites controlling transcription of the aroFtyrA operon of Escherichia coli K-12”.

Dickson gained further research experience working in the Laboratory of Joachim Spiess at the Salk Institute in San Diego between 1987 and 1989. Following this, Dickson took up research for a PhD at the University of Zurich in Switzerland, where he worked in the lab of Ernst Hafen on the visual system development of Drosophila. He was awarded a PhD in 1992 and remained in the lab as postdoctoral researcher for two more years.

== Career and research ==
In 1994, Dickson joined Corey Goodman for postdoctoral research at the University of California, Berkeley. There, he started working on the molecular and cellular mechanisms of axon pathfinding.

Dickson continued this work while establishing his own research group at the University of Zurich. In 1998, Dickson moved to Vienna where he became group leader at the Research Institute of Molecular Pathology (IMP) for five years, followed by a position as senior scientist at the newly founded Institute of Molecular Biotechnology (IMBA).

Around this time, his research focus shifted to a new topic, the genetic basis of complex innate behavior in Drosophila. In 2005, he published a key paper in which he described a master gene for sex specific behavior in fruit flies, which stimulated discussions beyond the scientific community. Shortly after this discovery, Dickson received a Wittgenstein Award in recognition of his work.

In 2006, Dickson succeeded Kim Nasmyth as scientific director of the IMP. Research in his lab now focused more on understanding the genetic and neural underpinnings of innate behaviors in Drosophila.

In 2013, Dickson followed a call to the Janelia Farm Research Campus of the Howard Hughes Medical Institute. Dickson continued his studies of fruit fly mating behavior to help uncover how the brain processes information and makes decisions. Using thermogenetic screening, Dickson and his research group identified neurons in the fruit fly’s brain that cause a change in locomotion. In a paper published in 2014, they describe four lines of flies that walked backward on heat activation. The scientists were able to track down these changes to specific nerve cells in the fly brain which they dubbed „moonwalker neurons“.

== Awards and honours ==
- 2026 Elected International Member of the National Academy of Sciences
- 2024 Elected Fellow of the Royal Society
- 2009 Elected AAAS Fellow
- 2006 Remedios Caro Almela Prize for Research in Developmental Neurobiology
- 2005 Wittgenstein Prize, Austrian Academy of Sciences (ÖAW)
- 2003 EMBO Membership
- 2000 EMBO Young Investigator Award
