= Research Institute of Molecular Pathology =

Austrian biomedical research center

Research Institute of Molecular Pathology (IMP)
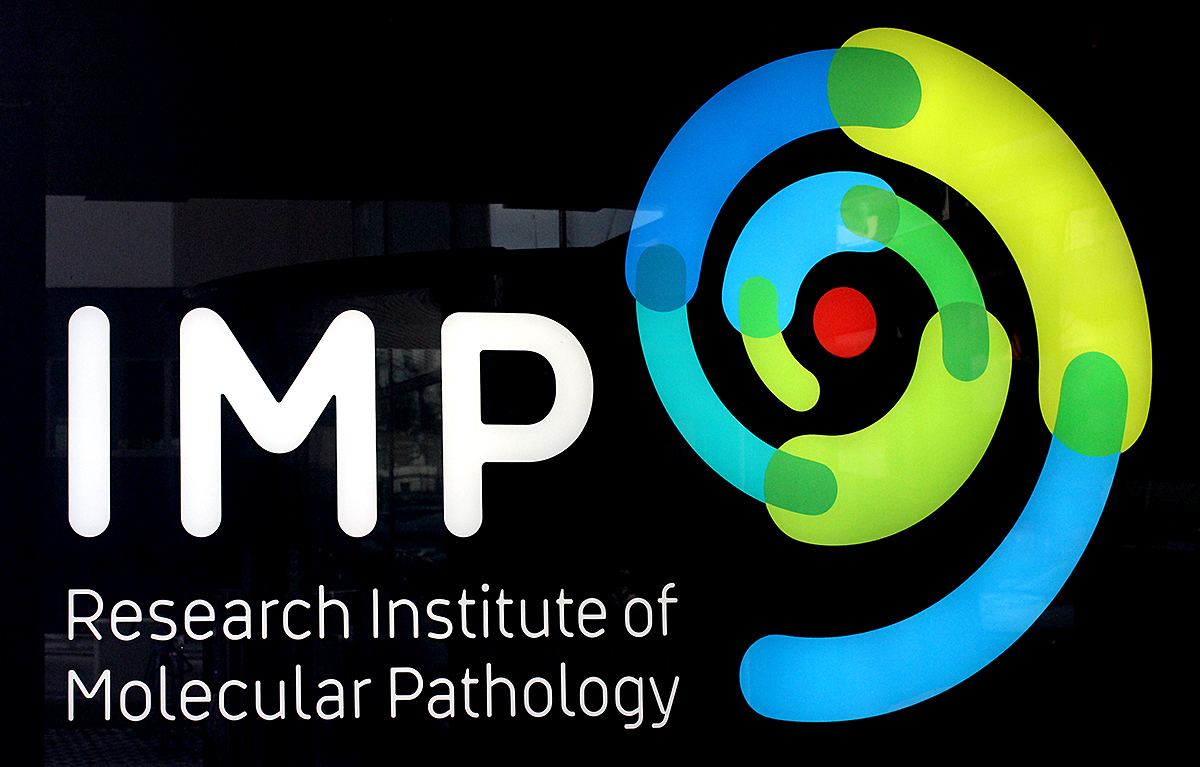
- Established: 1985
- Research type: Basic (non-clinical); Life sciences
- Field of research: Molecular and Cellular Biology; Structural biology and biochemistry; Gene expression and chromosome biology; Stem cell biology and development; Immunology and cancer
- Director: Jan-Michael Peters (science); Harald Isemann (administration)
- Faculty: 15
- Staff: 280
- Location: Campus-Vienna-Biocenter 1, 1030 Vienna, Austria, Vienna, Austria
- Website: www.imp.ac.at

The Research Institute of Molecular Pathology (IMP) is a biomedical research center, which conducts curiosity-driven basic research in the molecular life sciences.

The IMP is located at the Vienna Biocenter in Vienna, Austria. The institute employs around 280 people from 40 countries, of which over 200 are scientists. The working language at the IMP is English. The IMP was established in 1985 and is funded by the pharmaceutical company Boehringer Ingelheim and research grants.

== Research ==
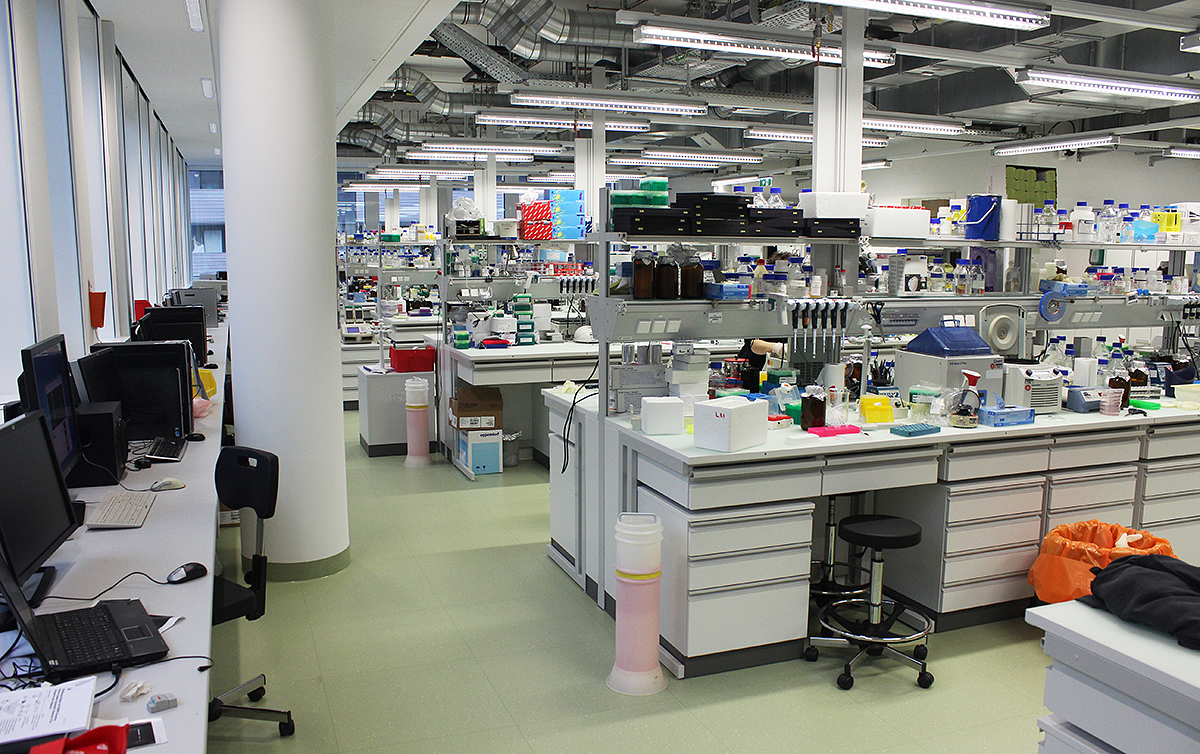
Laboratory at the IMP. Up to three research groups share a lab to support communication and exchange.

IMP comprises 15 independent research groups performing basic biological research across the following areas:

- molecular and cellular biology;
- structural biology and biochemistry;
- gene expression and chromosome biology;
- stem cell biology and development;
- immunology and cancer.

=== Publications, awards and honours ===
Scientists at the IMP publish 60 to 90 papers in international peer-review journals per year: between 1985 and 2021, more than 2,200 research papers were published. 93 patents were filed based on discoveries made at the institute since 1985. IMP faculty was awarded 24 ERC Grants since the establishment of this grant scheme in 2007; about two thirds of the IMP faculty were ERC grantees by 2018. Five IMP faculty members received Wittgenstein Awards since 1996. About one third of the faculty are elected members of EMBO. In 2017, Kim Nasmyth received the Breakthrough Prize in life sciences for work on cohesin that he had done at the IMP. One year later, his former IMP PhD student Angelika Amon was awarded the same prize.

=== Facilities ===
The IMP maintains a suite of in-house facilities, maintained in cooperation with the adjacent institutes IMBA and GMI, that provide support and scientific services to the scientists at the IMP. In addition, the Vienna Biocenter maintains a number of shared services jointly through the "Vienna BioCenter Core Facilities" (VBCF). The services offered are available to all Vienna BioCenter scientists and companies, including IMP staff.

== History ==
The establishment of the IMP was a joint venture by Boehringer Ingelheim and Genentech and initiated in 1985. Under the directorship of Max Birnstiel, the first institute building was opened in 1988.

In 1992, three institutes of the faculties of science and medicine of the University of Vienna moved into a nearby building, today's Max Perutz Labs. This created the basis for referring to the area as the "Vienna Biocenter".

In 1993, Boehringer Ingelheim took over the IMP shares of Genentech. Following Max Birnstiel's retirement in 1997, Kim Nasmyth became scientific director.

In 2006, two institutes of the Austrian Academy of Sciences were opened in the vicinity of the IMP: the Institute of Molecular Biotechnology (IMBA) and the Gregor Mendel Institute (GMI). The three institutes cooperate closely by maintaining shared facilities. In the same year, Barry Dickson became the IMP's scientific director.

Since 2013, Jan-Michael Peters is scientific director of the IMP. In late 2016, the IMP moved into its new building, which was formally opened on 1 March 2017.

In 2019, the International Birnstiel Award was established by the IMP. It is awarded annually by the Max Birnstiel Foundation and the IMP, and it targets doctoral students at an advanced stage of their PhD research who have contributed to making an outstanding discovery in their field.

== PhD program ==
The "Vienna BioCenter PhD Program" is an international PhD training program carried out jointly by four Vienna Biocenter research institutes. Acceptance into the program is competitive and based on a formal selection procedure. There are two selections each year, deadlines are usually in April and November. Participation in the program is a condition for doing a PhD at the IMP.

== Building ==
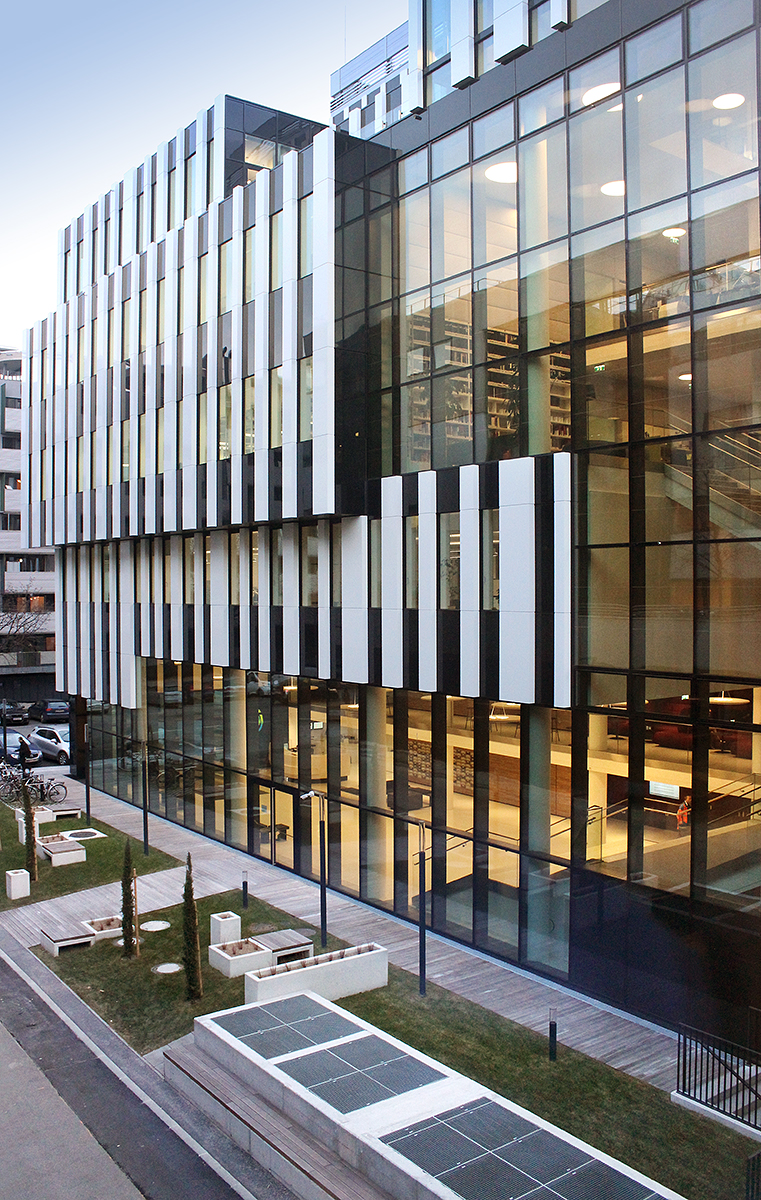
Research Institute of Molecular Pathology (IMP), outside view.

The current IMP building at Campus-Vienna-Biocenter 1 was opened in 2017. It comprises 15,000 square meters of gross floor space and 8,000 square meters of net area, spread over eight levels.

The building contains 3,000 square meters for laboratories and 2,000 square meters for offices; its lecture hall seats up to 280 people. The buildings has six seminar rooms and technical facilities. Some facilities such as cafeteria, but also scientific services, are open to staff from other Vienna Biocenter entities and the IMP building is connected to the neighboring Institute of Molecular Biotechnology building through a bridge.

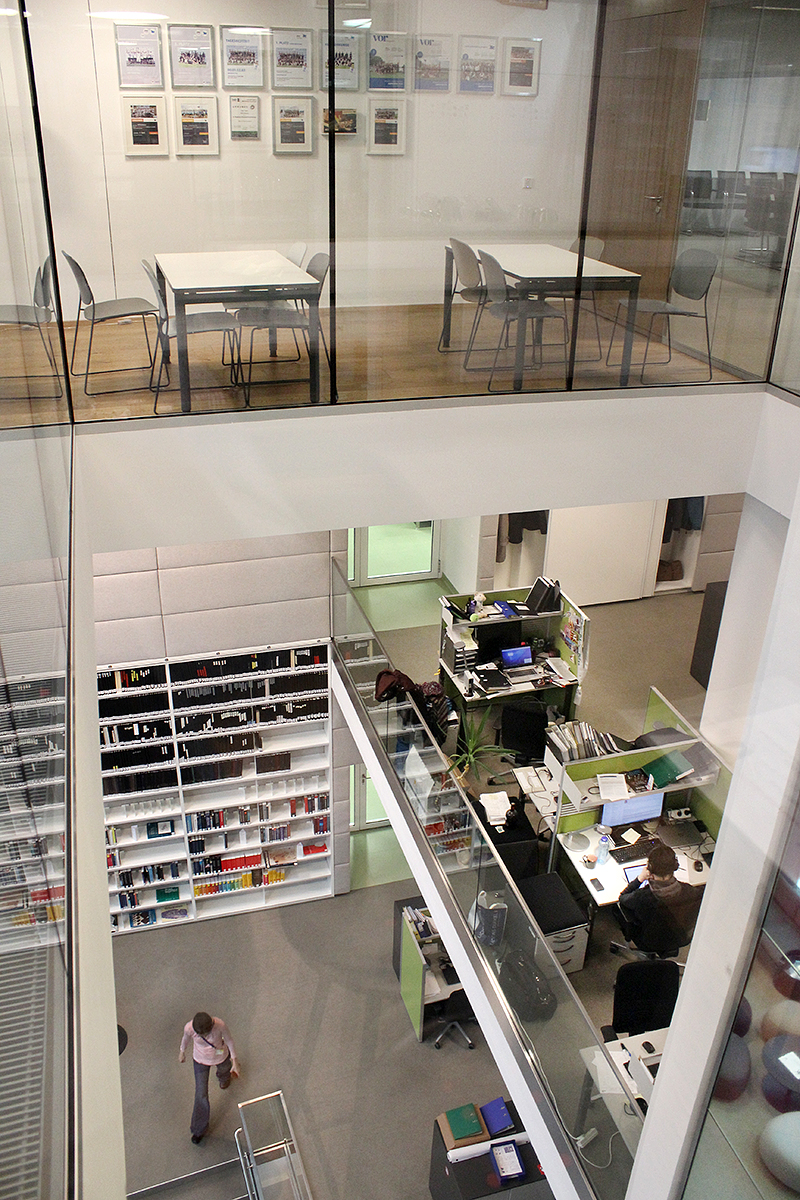
Split-level architecture blending different floors and functions of the new IMP building.

Several features of the building refer to biological research: the facade features stripes should resemble DNA bands as seen in gel electrophoresis; the central elevator's glass covers are coated with dichroic foils which are also used in filters for light microscopy. The project costs of 52 million Euros were borne by the IMP's main sponsor Boehringer Ingelheim.

== Scientific Advisory Board ==
To maintain a high standard of research, the IMP employs a process of continuous review and feedback. The Scientific Advisory Board (SAB), consisting of distinguished scientists, meets once a year and discusses the quality, significance, and main focus of research conducted at the IMP. The SAB is chaired by Dirk Schübeler of Friedrich Miescher Institute. Its other members are Adrian Bird (University of Edinburgh); Taekjip Ha (Harvard Medical School); Norbert Kraut (Boehringer Ingelheim); Ruth Lehmann (New York University); Scott Lowe (Memorial Sloan Kettering Cancer Center); Eva Nogales (University of California, Berkeley).

== Funding ==
The operating budget of the IMP is provided largely by Boehringer Ingelheim. Support comes from grants awarded to individual scientists and projects by national and international funding agencies such as the Austrian Science Fund (FWF), Austrian Industrial Research Promotion Fund (FFG), the Vienna Science and Technology Fund (WWTF), Zentrum für Innovation und Technologie (ZIT), the City of Vienna, the Austrian federal government, the Human Frontier Science Program (HFSP), and the European Union (EU).

== Notable people ==
=== Group leaders and research areas ===
- Francisco Balzarotti: Advanced light microscopy and biophysics
- Meinrad Busslinger: Stem cell commitment in haematopoiesis
- Tim Clausen: molecular mechanisms of protein quality control
- Andrea Pauli: molecular mechanisms of fertilization
- Clemens Plaschka: Messenger RNA (mRNA) maturation
- Jan-Michael Peters: mitosis and chromosome biology
- Alexander Stark: systems biology of regulatory motifs and networks – towards understanding gene expression from the DNA sequence

=== Alumni ===
- Angelika Amon, master student/PhD student, 1989-1993
- Denise Barlow, group leader, 1988-1996
- Hartmut Beug, senior scientist 1988-2010
- Adrian Bird, senior scientist 1987-1990
- Max Birnstiel, managing director 1989-1996
- Barry Dickson, group leader 1998-2002; managing director 2006-2012
- Thomas Jenuwein, group leader/senior scientist 1993-2008
- David Keays, fellow and group leader 2008-2021
- Kim Nasmyth, senior scientist/managing director 1989-2003
- Giulio Superti-Furga, PhD student 1988-1990
- Elly Tanaka, senior scientist 2016-2024
- Frank Uhlmann, postdoc 1997-2000
- Erwin Wagner, senior scientist/deputy director 1988-2008
- Martin Zenke, group leader 1988-1995
