= Human Frontier Science Program =

Organization in France

The Human Frontier Science Program
- Abbreviation: HFSP
- Location: Strasbourg, France
- Key people: Yoshihiro Yoneda, HFSPO President; Pavel Kabat, HFSPO Secretary General

The International Human Frontier Science Program Organization (HFSPO) is a non-profit organization, based in Strasbourg, France, that funds basic research in life sciences. The organization implements the Human Frontier Science Program (HFSP) and is supported by 14 countries and the European Commission. Yoshihiro Yoneda is the HFSPO President and Chair of the Board of Trustees since 2024.

== History ==
In 1986, Japanese scientists, supported by the Japanese Prime Minister's Council for Science and Technology, conducted a feasibility study to explore international collaboration in basic research. Subsequent discussions involving scientists from G7 summit nations and the European Union led to the "London Wise Men's Conference" in April 1987, endorsing the idea. Prime Minister Yasuhiro Nakasone proposed the Human Frontier Science Program at the Venice Economic Summit in June 10th 1987, gaining support from the Economic Summit partners and the Chairman of the European Community. The International Human Frontier Science Program Organization (HFSPO) was then established in 1989, with its secretariat in Strasbourg, France. Since 1990, the program has granted over 7000 awards to researchers from 70+ countries with 28 HFSP awardees later receiving the Nobel Prize for their scientific contributions.

== Funding ==
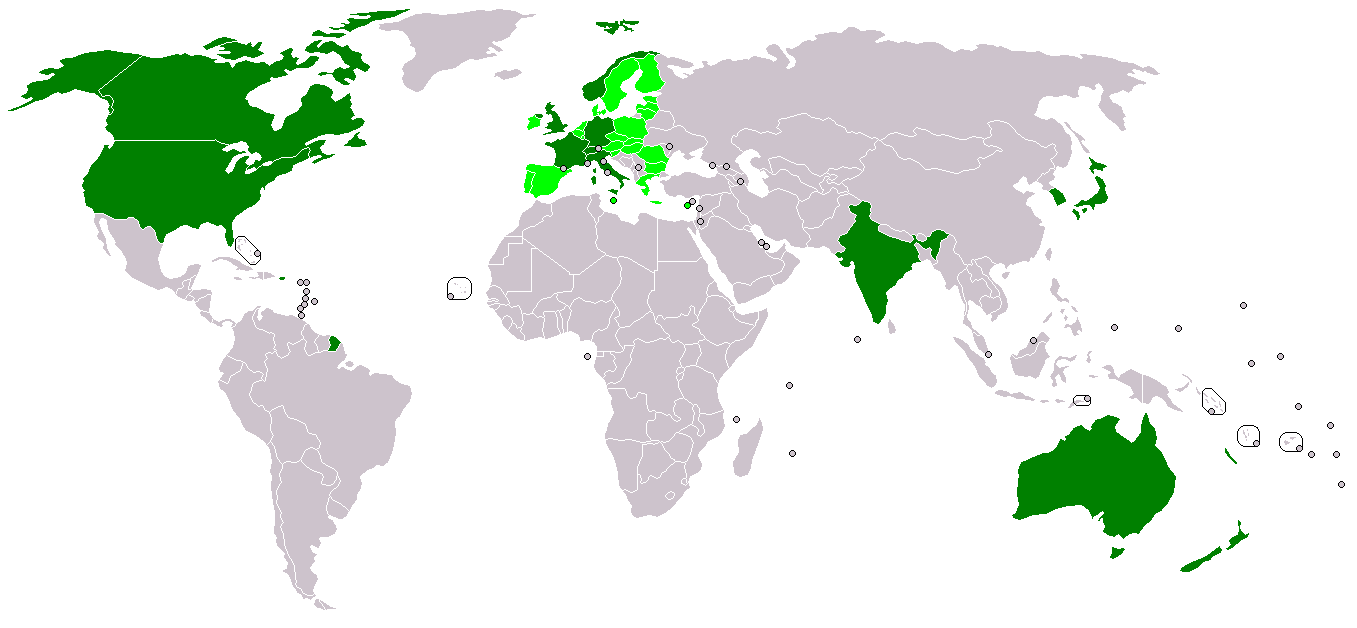

HFSPO secures financial backing from a range of governments and research councils, including Australia, Canada, France, Germany, India, Israel, Italy, Japan, Republic of Korea, New Zealand, Singapore, Switzerland, the UK, USA, and the European Commission, representing non-G7 EU members. These contributions are consolidated into a unified budget, which is used to fund research fellowships and grants through HFSPO's peer review system, with a primary emphasis on science.

== Funding programs ==
The organization offers Research grants, which encourage collaboration among scientists globally. These grants come in two types: Research Grants - Early Career and Research Grants - Program.

Postdoctoral Fellowships cater to individuals seeking experience in foreign labs, especially those early in their careers exploring different research fields. Fellows can also use these opportunities to establish independent research labs in their home countries.

Cross-Disciplinary Fellowships are designed for postdocs with Ph.D. degrees in the physical sciences, chemistry, mathematics, engineering and computer sciences who aim to gain training in biology.

HFSP funding primarily supports postdoctoral initiatives, with no provisions for undergraduate or PhD students.

== HFSP peer review ==
International peer review is a fundamental part of the awarding process, involving two committees—one for Fellowships and one for Research Grants, each composed of 24 to 26 scientists. These committees have a diverse global representation of scientific experts, reviewing applications across all HFSP-supported scientific fields. The evaluation procedures undergo regular review, and the HFSP secretariat collaborates closely with committee members and the Council of Scientists.

== HFSP Nakasone Award ==
In 2010, HFSP established the HFSP Nakasone Award to honour former Prime Minister Yasuhiro Nakasone of Japan for his vision in launching HFSP as a program of support for international collaboration and to foster early career scientists in a global context. The HFSP Nakasone Award is designed to recognise scientists who have undertaken frontier-moving research, including technological breakthroughs, which has advanced biological research. Both senior and junior scientists are eligible and peer-recognised excellence is the major criterion. The award can be made to an individual or a team of scientists. Award winners receive an unrestricted research grant of USD 10,000, a medal and personalised certificate. The award ceremony is held at the annual HFSP Awardees Meeting where the award winners are expected to deliver the HFSP Nakasone Lecture.

Recipients of the Award:

- 2010 Karl Deisseroth (Stanford University, USA), "for his pioneering work on the development of optogenetic methods for studying the function of neuronal networks underlying behavior".
- 2011 Michael Elowitz (California Institute of Technology, USA), "for his pioneering work on gene expression noise".
- 2012 Gina G. Turrigiano (Brandeis University, USA), "for her pioneering work on homeostatic plasticity in the nervous system"
- 2013 Stephen Quake (Stanford University, USA), "for his pioneering work that advanced biological measuring techniques".
- 2014 Uri Alon (Weizmann Institute of Science, Rehovot, Israel), "for his pioneering work in discovering network motifs".
- 2015 James J. Collins (Center of Synthetic Biology of Boston University, USA), "for his innovative work on synthetic gene networks and programmable cells".
- 2016 Emmanuelle Charpentier (Max Planck Institute for Infection Biology, Berlin, Germany) and Jennifer Doudna (University of California, Berkeley, USA), "for their seminal work on the CRISPR-Cas9 system".
- 2017 David Julius (University of California, San Francisco, USA), "for his discovery of the molecular mechanism of thermal sensing in animals".
- 2018 Svante Pääbo (Max Planck Institute for Evolutionary Anthropology, Leipzig, Germany), "for his discovery of the extent to which hybridization with Neanderthals and Denisovans has shaped the evolution of modern humans".
- 2019 Michael N. Hall (Biozentrum University of Basel, Switzerland), " for the 'discovery of the master regulator of cell growth, the target of rapamycin (TOR) kinase".
- 2020 Angelika Amon (Koch Institute of Integrative Cancer Research at MIT, Cambridge, USA), for 'discovering aneuploidy-induced cellular changes and their contribution to tumorigenesis.'
- 2021 Anthony Hyman (Max Planck Institute of Molecular Cell Biology and Genetics, Dresden, Germany) and Clifford Brangwynne (Princeton University and the Howard Hughes Medical Institute, USA), for their 'discovery of a new state of biological matter, phase-separated macromolecule condensates, that play an important role in cell organisation, gene regulation, signalling and pathology.'

== HFSP Journal ==
Launched in October 2006, the HFSP Journal aims to foster communication between scientists publishing innovative research at the frontiers of the life sciences. Peer review is designed to allow for the unique requirements of such papers and is overseen by an Editorial Board with members from different disciplines. The HFSP Journal offers its authors the option to pay a fee to make their research articles Open Access immediately upon publication. For other articles, access is limited to subscribers for the first 6 months after publication, but access is free thereafter.

The HFSP Journal ceased publication in July 2010 and was bought by the scientific publisher Taylor & Francis, to be re-launched in 2011.

In 2015, the HFSP reported that the former journal name had been hijacked in an apparent attempt to defraud researchers into publishing an apparent scam journal.
