= Sara A. Courtneidge =

Sara A. Courtneidge is a cancer research scientist.

== Education and research ==
Courtneidge was a very young child when she decided that she wanted to be a scientist. Years later, she earned her Bachelor of Science certificate in Biochemistry from the University of Leeds and her PhD at the National Institute for Medical Research. After receiving her PhD, Courtneidge accepted a research position with J. Michael Bishop at The University of California, Berkeley where she began her research on the Proto-oncogene tyrosine-protein kinase Src. Courtneidge’s most notable finding is her discovery of the link between the T antigen of polyomavirus and c-Src. Along with this finding, Courtneidge determined that Src is negatively activated through its association with tyrosine kinase.

== Career ==
Throughout her career, Courtneidge has held many leadership roles in numerous scientific communities. Some of these communities include The Van Andel Research Institute in Grand Rapids, Michigan where Courtneidge served as the Distinguished Scientific Investigator of Signal Regulation and Cancer, Sugen, Inc. where Courtneidge acted as Chief Scientist and Vice President of Research, and The European Molecular Biology Laboratory where she worked as both Group Leader and Senior Scientist. Courtneidge was also appointed to the Scientific Advisory Board of TargeGen, Inc., a biopharmaceutical company in California which focuses on vascular biology and the development of methods to treat cancer and ischemic diseases. Courtneidge received the AACR-Women in Cancer Research Charlotte Friend Memorial Lectureship in 2015. This lecture is awarded to a scientist who has made impressive achievements in cancer research and has served as an outstanding leader to others.
