= Max Birnstiel =

Swiss molecular biologist (1933–2014)

Max L. Birnstiel
- Max Birnstiel in approximately 1990
- Born: 12 July 1933; Brazil
- Died: 15 November 2014 (aged 81); Wollerau, Switzerland
- Education: ETH Zurich
- Known for: Study of eukaryotic gene regulation
- Scientific career
- Fields: Molecular biology
- Workplaces: University of Edinburgh; University of Zurich; Research Institute of Molecular Pathology
- Doctoral advisor: Albert Frey-Wyssling
- Notable students: Adrian Bird; Michael Grunstein

Max Luciano Birnstiel (12 July 1933 – 15 November 2014) was a Swiss molecular biologist who held a number of positions in scientific leadership in Europe, including the chair of the Institute of Molecular Biology at the University of Zurich from 1972 to 1986, and that of founding director of the Research Institute of Molecular Pathology (IMP) in Vienna from 1986 to 1996. His research focused on gene regulation in eukaryotes. His research group was the first to purify single genes, the ribosomal RNA genes from Xenopus laevis in 1965. He is also recognized for one of the earliest discoveries of a gene enhancer element in 1980. Birnstiel died in 2014 of heart failure during cancer treatment.

== Early life and education ==
Birnstiel was born in Brazil in 1933; his father, also Max Birnstiel, was Swiss and his mother, Dalila Varella, was Brazilian. The family moved to Switzerland when the younger Max was five years old, and he was educated in Zurich. He received his Ph.D. in botany in 1959 from ETH Zurich under the supervision of Albert Frey-Wyssling and then became a postdoctoral fellow at the California Institute of Technology with James Bonner.

== Academic career ==
In 1963, Birnstiel was recruited by Conrad Waddington to a faculty position in the genetics department at the University of Edinburgh, where he remained until 1972, advancing to the rank of professor. His work at Edinburgh included studying the physical properties of genes, leading to the successful purification of ribosomal RNA genes from Xenopus laevis; this body of work was performed with Ph.D. students Adrian Bird, Michael Grunstein, and Hugh Wallace and led to further study of gene structure in collaboration with Donald Brown. The work has been cited as the first purification of single genes, announced at a meeting in 1965, years prior to the isolation of the bacterial lac operon, and is noted as a key piece of evidence in establishing the chemical nature of the gene.

Returning to Switzerland, Birnstiel accepted a chair position at the then-new Institute of Molecular Biology II at the University of Zurich in 1972 – the planned IMB being split into two separate institutes to accommodate both Birnstiel and Charles Weissmann as molecular biology chairs. Zurich was the site of his work on purification of histone genes, which led to one of the first discoveries of an enhancer element which he termed the "modulator".

Birnstiel was sought out as a candidate for the directorship of a then-new privately funded institute to be founded in Vienna – not then well regarded as a research hub – with funding from Boehringer Ingelheim and Genentech. In 1986, Birnstiel became the founding director of the Research Institute of Molecular Pathology (IMP), which under his leadership became a major center for life sciences research and the biotechnology industry. Birnstiel served as director at the IMP until 1996, when he retired and was succeeded by Kim Nasmyth.

Birnstiel also held positions of service to the broader scientific community as the Chairman of the EMBO Council and editor-in-chief of EMBO Journal from 1983 to 1990.

In 1998, he and colleagues from IMP founded Intercell AG, a spin-off company. In 2013 Intercell merged with another European biotech, Vivalis, to create a successor company Valneva that focuses on vaccine development.

== Awards and honors ==
Birnstiel received numerous awards for his scientific achievements and was regarded in the 1980s as a major figure in the Swiss scientific community.

- 1979: Otto Nägeli Prize
- 1983: Foreign Associate of the United States National Academy of Sciences
- 1987: Member of the German Academy of Sciences Leopoldina
- 1994: Wilhelm Exner Medal

== Personal life ==
During his postdoctoral fellowship in the U.S., Birnstiel met and developed a collaboration with a British biologist, Margaret Chipchase, whom he married in 1961 and had two children with.

He died in 2014 at age 81, of heart failure following radiation therapy for inoperable cancer.

== Legacy ==
In 2017, the Max Birnstiel Foundation was created to promote training and career development of young researchers in the field of molecular life sciences. In 2019, the Max Birnstiel Foundation and the IMP established the Birnstiel Award for Doctoral Research in Molecular Life Sciences, which was presented for the first time in autumn 2019.
