= Kim Nasmyth =

British biochemist

Kim Nasmyth FRS FMedSci
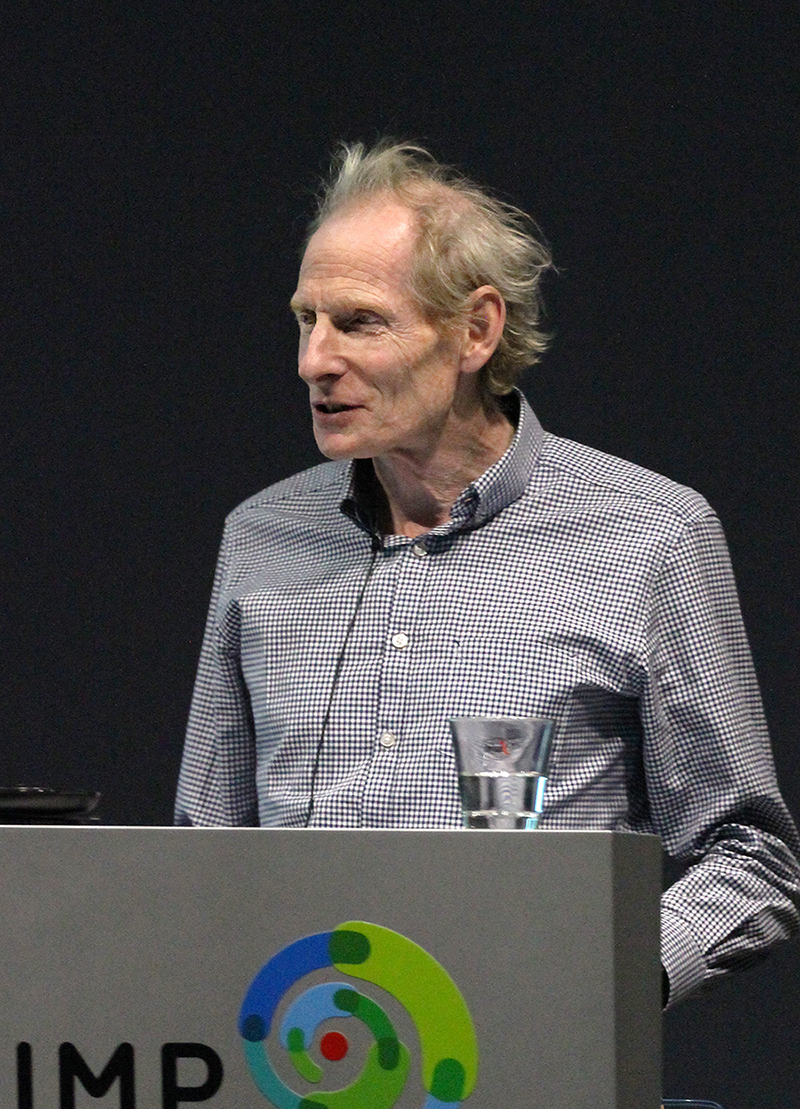
- Nasmyth in 2017
- Born: Kim Ashley Nasmyth; 10 October 1952 (age 73)
- Education: Eton College
- Alma mater: University of York (BSc); University of Edinburgh (PhD)
- Known for: Cohesin
- Spouse: Anna Dowson (m. 1982)
- Children: Two
- Awards: EMBO Member (1985); Wittgenstein-Preis (1999); Gairdner Foundation International Award (2007); Louis-Jeantet Prize for Medicine (1997); Breakthrough Prize in Life Sciences (2018)
- Scientific career
- Fields: molecular biology, gene regulation, cell cycle control
- Institutions: University of Oxford; Research Institute of Molecular Pathology
- Thesis: DNA replication in Schizosaccharomyces pombe (1977)
- Doctoral advisor: Murdoch Mitchison
- Notable students: Anton Gartner; Angelika Amon; Andrea Brand
- Website: www.bioch.ox.ac.uk/research/nasmyth

Kim Ashley Nasmyth (born 18 October 1952) is an English geneticist, the Whitley Professor of Biochemistry at the University of Oxford, a Fellow of Trinity College, Oxford, former scientific director of the Research Institute of Molecular Pathology (IMP), and former head of the Department of Biochemistry, University of Oxford. He is best known for his work on the segregation of chromosomes during cell division.

== Early life and education ==
Nasmyth was born in London in 1952 of James Ashley (Jan) Nasmyth and Jenny Hughes. His father Jan was doubly descended from King Charles II and founder of the billion dollar publishing company Argus Media. He attended Eton College, Berkshire, then the University of York, where he studied Biology. Nasmyth went on to complete his graduate studies in the group of Murdoch Mitchison at the University of Edinburgh. Here he worked on the cell cycle alongside Paul Nurse and his PhD thesis focused on the control of DNA replication in fission yeast. In Mitchison's lab he made substantial contributions to the study of the cell cycle in fission yeast isolating and characterising cell cycle mutants and the first identification of a gene product (DNA ligase) in these mutants.

== Career and research ==
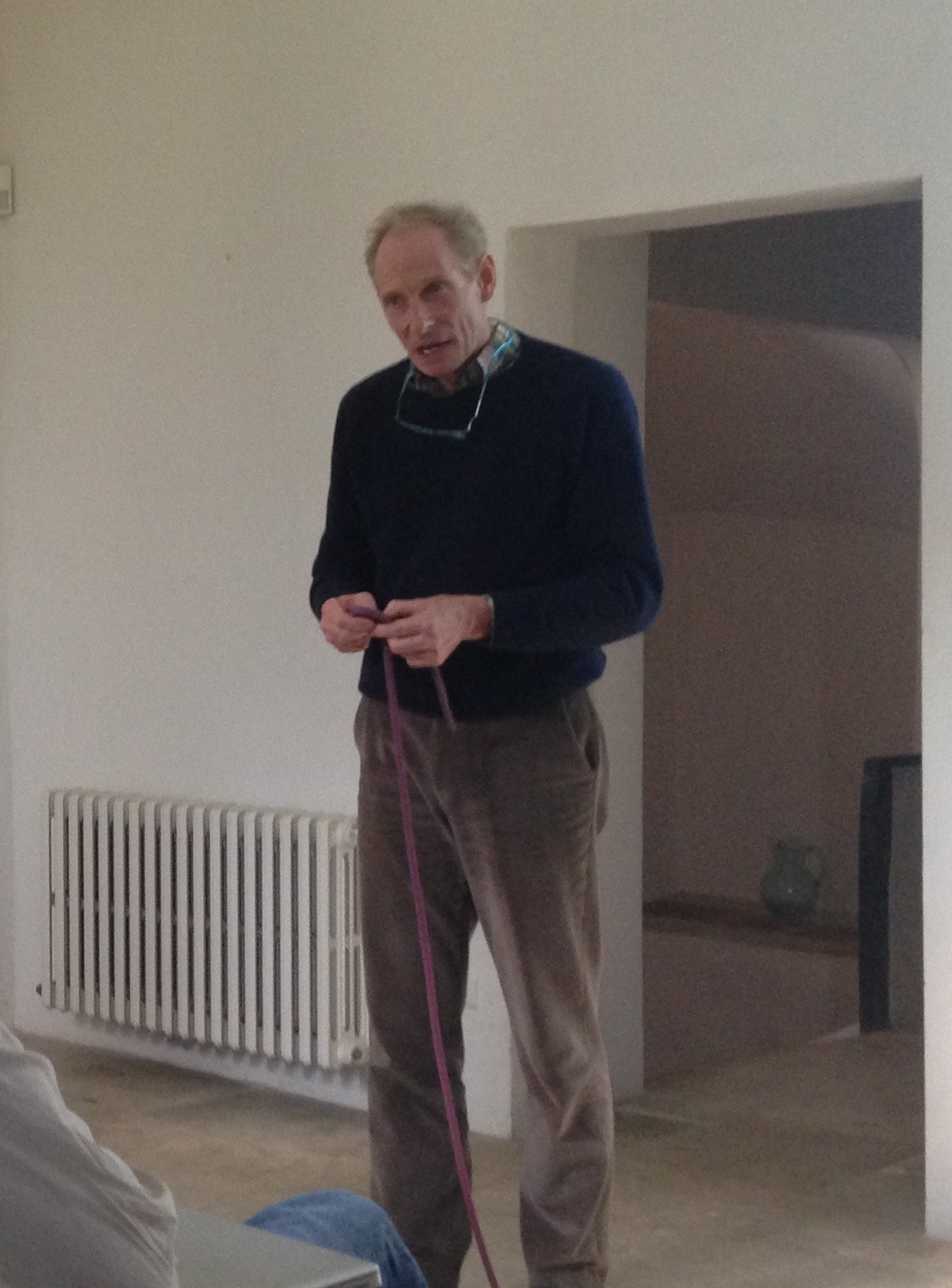
Kim Nasmyth explaining loop extrusion with a climbing rope

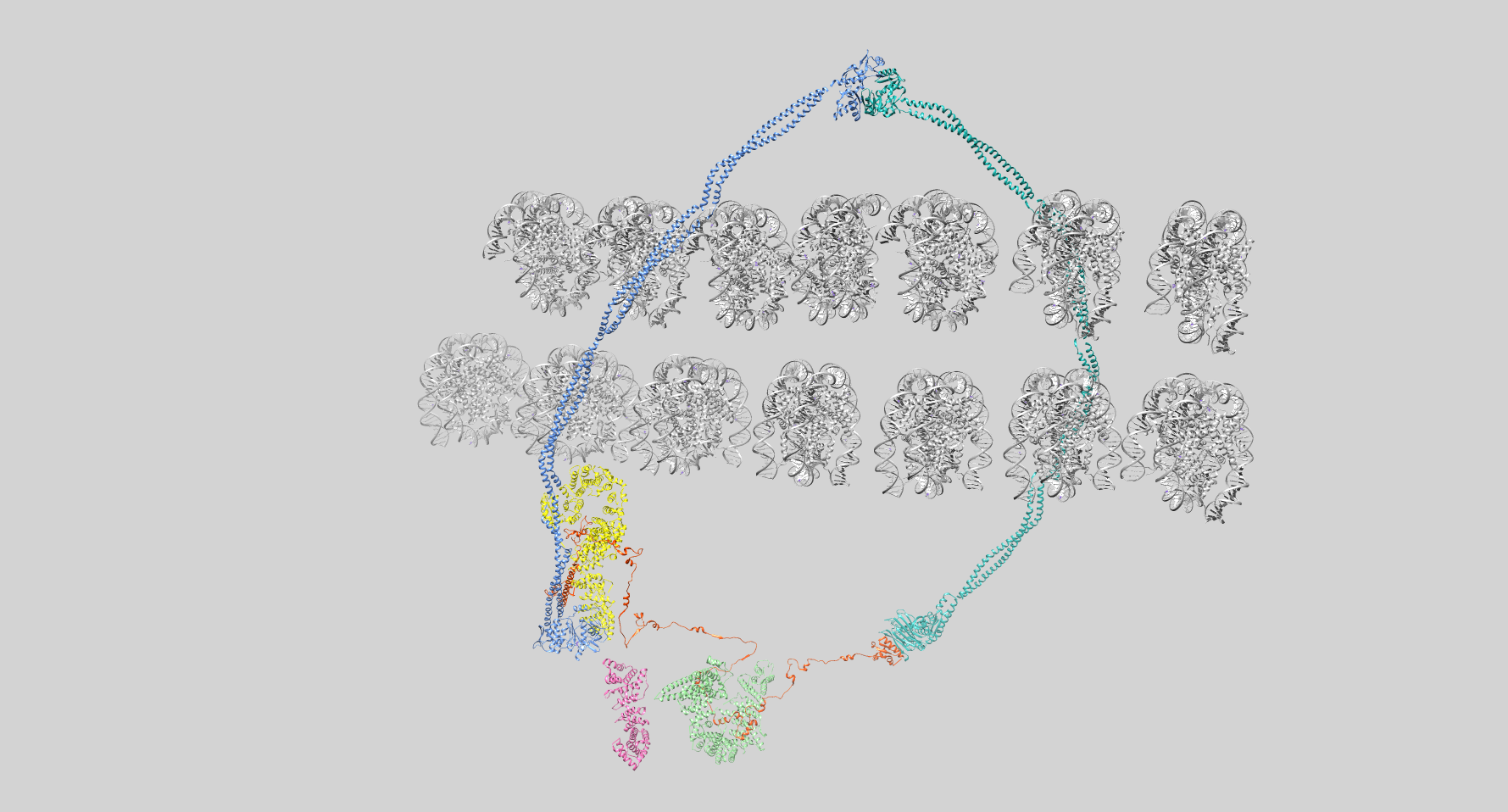
The cohesin complex entrapping sister DNAs

Nasmyth joined Ben Hall's lab in Seattle as a postdoctoral researcher where he developed ways of cloning genes by complementation in yeast and, in collaboration with Steve Reed, cloned the CDC28 gene from the budding yeast Saccharomyces cerevisiae.

As a group leader in Cambridge Nasmyth became interested in the phenomenon of mating-type switching in yeast. Together with Kelly Tatchell he cloned the S. cerevisiae mating-type locus and found, surprisingly, that 'silent' copies of the mating-type genes including their promoters are maintained in the yeast chromosome. This represented the first case where the position of a gene in the chromosome had demonstrable biological significance, and prompted Nasmyth to abandon work on the cell cycle for a time and concentrate instead on studying gene silencing. He was one of the first to demonstrate that gene expression can be regulated through specific control elements which are distant from the start of transcription.

Max Birnstiel invited Nasmyth to join him at the then newly founded Research Institute of Molecular Pathology (IMP) in Vienna, Austria, where he was director. Nasmyth became one of the first three senior group leaders that Birnstiel recruited in 1986. At the IMP, Nasmyth changed his focus from gene silencing back to cell cycle control. In the mid-1990s Nasmyth co-discovered the APC/C and showed that its activity induces chromosome segregation. Using temperature-sensitive mutants of the APC/C he found several genes which are required for sister chromatid cohesion which we now know encode subunits of the cohesin complex. Nasmyth has since shown that cohesin forms a ring, that sister chromatids are held together within this ring and that they are released by cleavage of cohesin by separase. Following Max Birnstiel's retirement, Nasmyth became scientific director of the IMP in 1997.

In 2006, Nasmyth left the IMP to become head of the Department of Biochemistry of the University of Oxford, a post he held until 2011. Nasmyth continues to head a research group at this department. He is a member of the Advisory Council for the Campaign for Science and Engineering. His research has been funded by the Medical Research Council (MRC), the Wellcome Trust, and Cancer Research UK. He plans to retire from research in 2022.

=== Awards and honours ===
Nasmyth has also been awarded the following:

- 1985 Member of the European Molecular Biology Organization
- 1989 Elected a Fellow of the Royal Society
- 1995 FEBS Silver Medal
- 1996 Unilever Science prize
- 1997 Louis-Jeantet Prize for Medicine
- 1999 Wittgenstein-Preis
- 1999 Foreign Honorary Member of the American Academy of Arts and Sciences
- 2002 Croonian lecture/Medal of the Royal Society
- 2003 Boveri award for Molecular Cancer Genetics
- 2007 Gairdner Foundation International Award
- 2009 Elected a Fellow of the Academy of Medical Sciences (FMedSci)
- 2018 Breakthrough Prize in Life Sciences

== Personal life ==
Nasmyth married Anna Dowson, daughter of Sir Philip Dowson, in 1982 and has two daughters. His younger brother is furniture designer, Luke Hughes. He enjoys skiing and climbing, a hobby to which he attributes his theory of how cohesin works. He also co-owns a vineyard in the south of France. Nasmyth held a large number of shares in his fathers billion dollar company Argus Media until its purchase by General Atlantic in 2016. In 2014 he was appointed director of Badger Lane Management company. During his time in Vienna, Nasmyth became Austrian citizen.
