= Thomas Graf (biologist) =

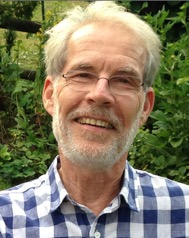
- Born: 28 September 1944 (age 81); Vienna, Austria
- Education: University of Tübingen
- Scientific career
- Fields: stem cells biology
- Workplaces: European Molecular Biology Laboratory, Albert Einstein College of Medicine, Centre for Genomic Regulation

Thomas Graf (born 28 September 1944) is a biologist at the Centre for Genomic Regulation (CRG) in Barcelona, Spain. He is a pioneer in cell reprogramming, showing that blood cells can be transdifferentiated by transcription factors. He is also known for his early work on oncogenes carried by retroviruses and oncogene cooperation in leukemia formation.

== Research ==
In the late 70s Graf co-discovered several cell-derived oncogenes acquired by avian retroviruses, designated Mac (later changed into Myc), Erb and Myb. He found that several naturally occurring virus strains have acquired various pairwise combinations of oncogenes and that these cooperate to cause acute leukemia, an early example for the multigenic origin of cancers. He also showed that the transcription factor Myb can reversibly block the differentiation of white blood cells, one of the first demonstrations of induced cell fate changes. In his more recent research he showed that different types of specialized blood cells can be induced to convert into each other by forced transcription factor expression. In 1995 he pioneered this technique permitting the transdifferentiation of white blood cells into red blood cell precursors and vice versa induced by Gata1 and PU.1, respectively. Later (2004) he managed to convert B lymphocytes into functional macrophages, using C/EBPa as a driver. Using the same approach he was also first to induce a conversion of more distantly related cells, namely that of non-blood cells into macrophages. Finally, he found that forced C/EBPa expression in malignant lymphocyte precursors leads to the formation of macrophages and loss of tumorigenicity, suggesting transdifferentiation as an alternative avenue for therapeutic interventions.

== Awards ==
- 1983 Wilhelm-Warner-Foundation Award
- 1983 Main Award, German Society for Microbiology and Hygiene
- 1983 Kind-Philipp-Foundation Leukemia Research Award
- 1988 Josef-Steiner-Foundation Prize
- 1988 Theodor Boveri Lecture and Award
- 1989 Paul Ehrlich-Ludwig Darmstaedter Prize
