= Institute of Molecular Biotechnology =

Austrian biomedical research organisation

Institute of Molecular Biotechnology (IMBA)
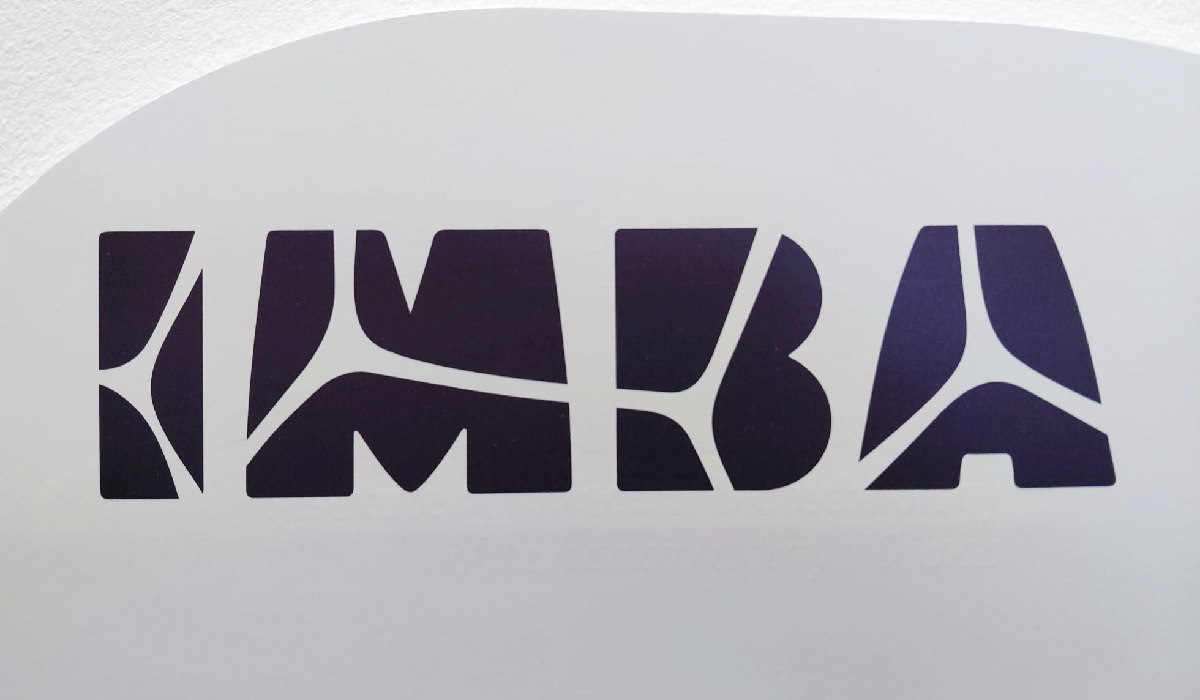
- Established: 1999
- Laboratory type: Basic life science research institute
- Field of research: Molecular biology, regeneration, organoids and stem cells
- Directors: Elly Tanaka (scientific), Barbara Kraus (business)
- Faculty: 15
- Staff: 250
- Location: Dr.-Bohr-Gasse 3, Vienna, Austria
- Campus: Vienna BioCenter
- Affiliations: Austrian Academy of Sciences, Vienna BioCenter
- Website: https://www.imba.oeaw.ac.at/

The Institute of Molecular Biotechnology (IMBA) is a biomedical research organisation of the Austrian Academy of Sciences, founded in cooperation with the pharmaceutical company Boehringer Ingelheim. The institute employs around 250 people from over 40 countries, who perform basic research. IMBA is located at the Vienna BioCenter and shares facilities and scientific training programs with the Gregor Mendel Institute of Molecular Plant Biology (GMI) of the Austrian Academy of Sciences and the Research Institute of Molecular Pathology (IMP), the basic research center of Boehringer Ingelheim.

== Research ==
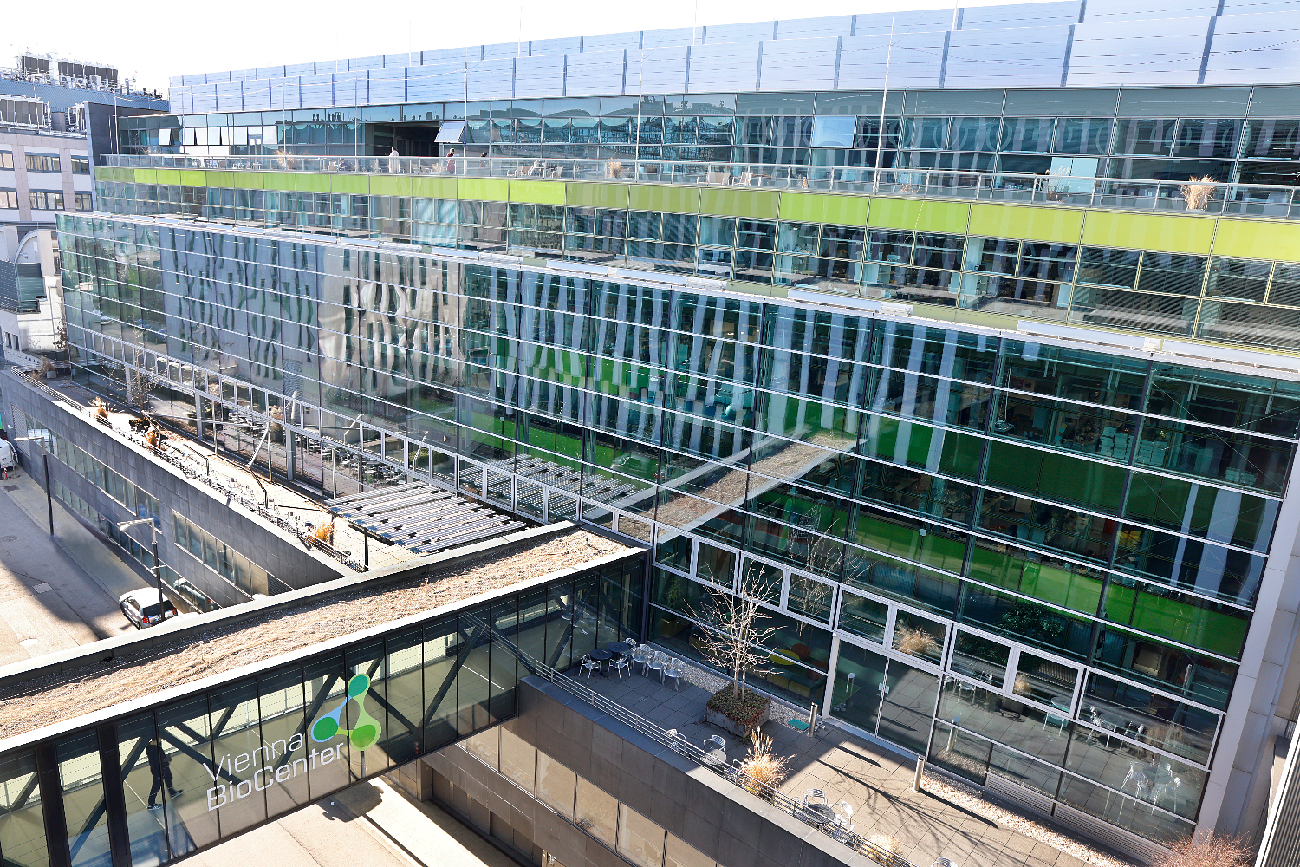
Outside view of IMBA and GMI, two institutes of the Austrian Academy of Sciences at the Vienna BioCenter.

Research at IMBA aims to understand the fundamental molecular biological processes underlying the 3D architecture of genomes, the functions of small RNAs, and the in vitro reconstitution from stem cells of whole organs and embryos.

As of 2026, the institute comprises 14 research groups:

- Julius Brennecke: Transposon silencing & heterochromatin formation by small RNAs. Pioneer in the discovery of the piRNA/Piwi pathway.
- Alejandro Burga: Molecular determinants of biological idiosyncrasy.
- Daan de Groot: Single cell fate determination.
- Daniel Gerlich: Chromosome sturcutre and dynamics.
- Anton Goloborodko: Theoretical models of chromosome structure.
- Sofia Grade: Mechanisms of plasticity after brain injury.
- Joanna Jachowicz: Dark genome in early mammalian development.
- Jürgen Knoblich: Brain development and disease. Developer of the cerebral organoid.
- Sven Klumpe: In situ structural biology and transposable elements
- Sasha Mendjan: Molecular control of human cardiogenesis. Developer of the human cardiac organoid.
- Josef Penninger (guest group of Medical University of Vienna): Modeling human disease.
- Nicolas Rivron: Blastoid development and implantation. Developer of the blastoid, a complete embryo model.
- Kristina Stapornwongkul: Role of metabolism in cell fate determination
- Elly Tanaka: Molecular mechanisms of vertebrate regeneration.
- Noelia Urbán: Systemic regulation of adult neurogenesis.

== Major scientific discoveries ==
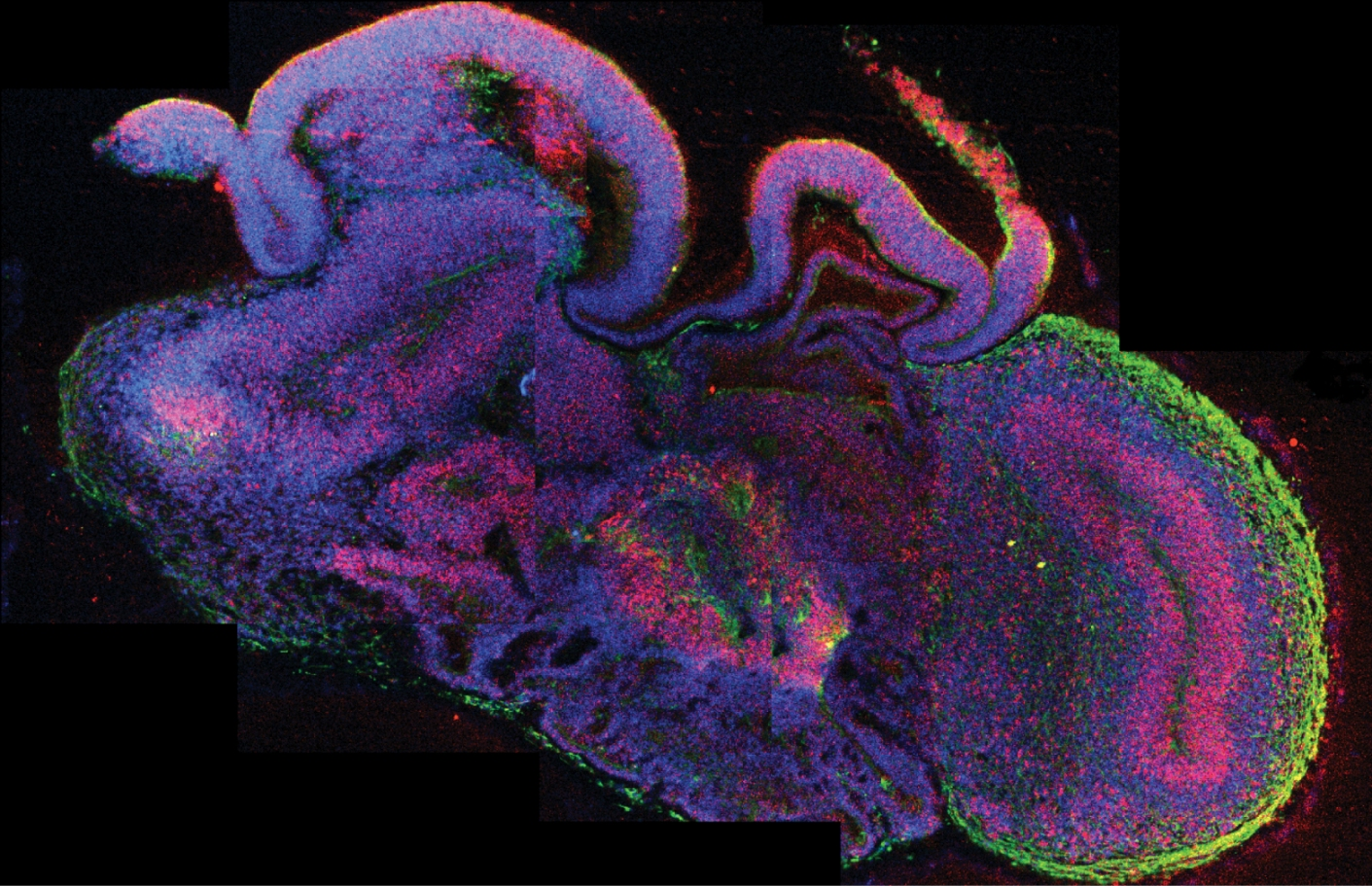
Cross-section of a human cerebral organoid, developed at IMBA in 2013. Stained for neurons in green and neural stem cells in red, all cell nuclei are stained in blue.

2023: First multi-chamber heart organoids

2022: Disentanglement of the roles of condensin and histone deacetylation in chromosome assembly and chromatin compaction

2022: Identification of CLIP cells (human interneuron progenitors) as the origin of Tuberous Sclerosis using patient-derived cerebral organoids

2021: Human blastoids model blastocyst development and implantation

2021: Cardioids reveal self-organizing principles of human cardiogenesis

2020: Identification of a brain-size determinant using cerebral organoids

2020: Discovery on the conformation of sister chromatids in the replicated human genome

2019: Generation of blood vessel organoids from human pluripotent stem cells.

2017: Development of SLAM-Seq for the high-resolution assessment of RNA expression dynamics

2013: Generation of cerebral organoids from human pluripotent stem cells to model human brain development

2008: Discovery of an endogenous small interfering RNA pathway in Drosophila.

2005: Discovery of the role of angiotensin converting enzyme 2 (ACE2) in SARS coronavirus–induced lung injury.

== History ==
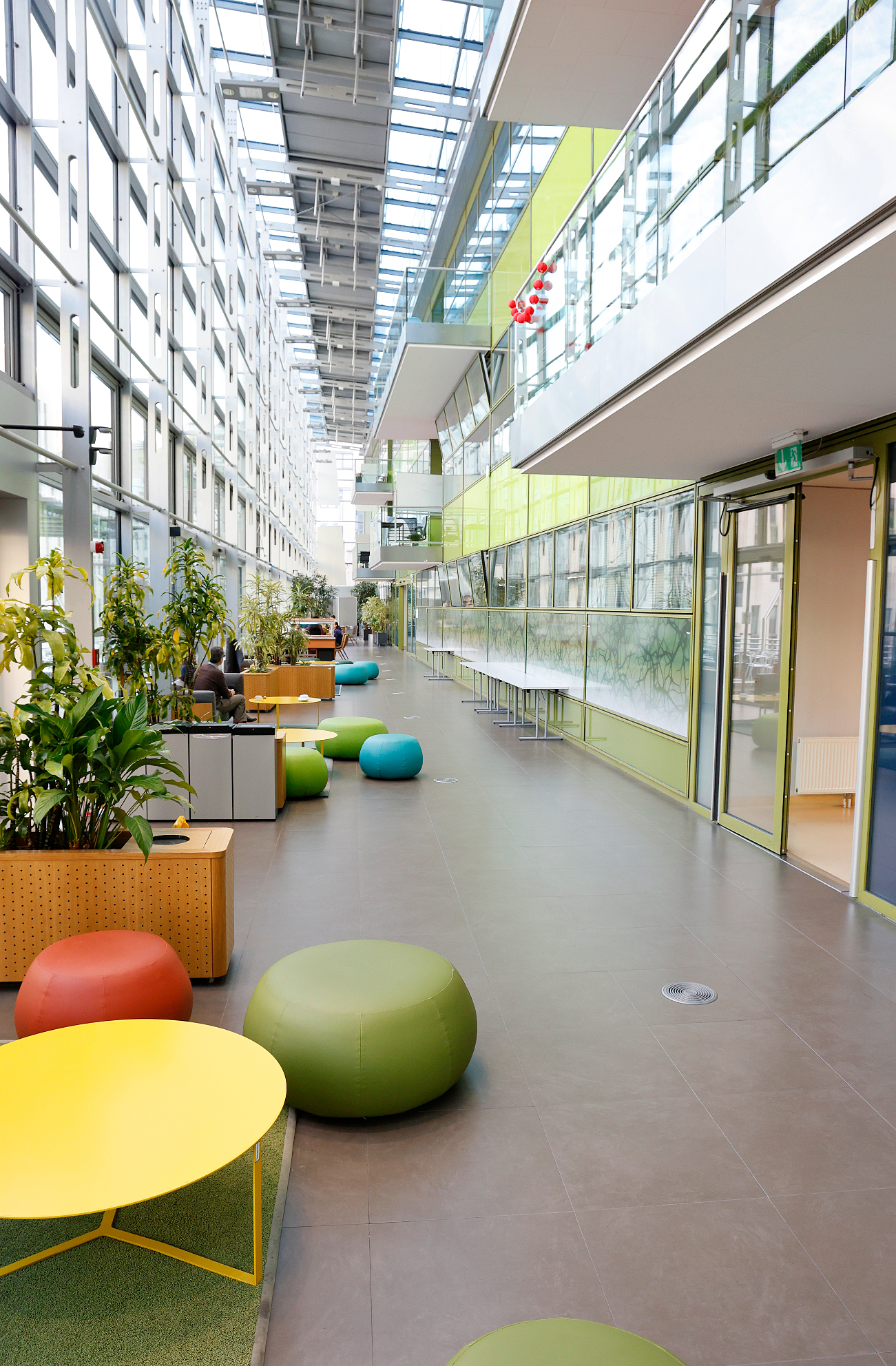
Atrium of the Institute of Molecular Biotechnology (IMBA) at the Vienna BioCenter in February 2026.

The institute was founded in 1999 as a joint initiative of the Austrian Academy of Sciences and Boehringer Ingelheim and with contributions from the Austrian Government and the city of Vienna. The construction of the building was initiated in 2003 and completed in 2006. It is linked to the building of the Research Institute of Molecular Pathology by a bridge so as to enhance collaborations. Both institutes share a common canteen and their scientific core facilities. In 2002, the geneticist Josef Penninger started as the Scientific Director of the IMBA and recruited Barry Dickson as the first group leader. In 2007 the Vienna Drosophila RNAi Center (VDRC) opened, in collaboration with the Research Institute of Molecular Pathology. In 2018, Josef Penninger was appointed as director of the Life Science Institute of the University of British Columbia and Jürgen Knoblich took the position as interim director of IMBA. In 2020, the institute expanded into an additional building of the Vienna Biocenter (termed VBC6). In 2024, Elly Tanaka took the position as Scientific Director of IMBA.

== Scientific Advisory Board ==
IMBA employs a process of review and feedback led by an external Scientific Advisory Board (SAB) of scientists. The board meets yearly and, together with group leaders, discusses the quality, significance, and focus of research conducted. As of 2026, the board is chaired by Maria Leptin (European Research Council), and includes Iain Cheeseman (Whitehead Institute and Massachusetts Institute of Technology), Déborah Bourc'his (Institut Curie), Denis Jabaudon (Geneva University), Elizabeth Robertson (Sir William Dunn School of Pathology, University of Oxford), Alexander van Oudenaarden (Hubrecht Institute).

== Core scientific facilities ==
Core scientific facilities within IMBA provide services to facilitate research making use of stem cells, flies/worms, informatics, optics, molecular biology, comparative medicine, transgenics, protein chemistry, or graphic designs. These core facilities are managed by technical leaders who evaluate and implement a wide range of novel technologies and instrumentations. These professional staff scientists also train users, help with experimental design, and disseminate expert knowledge. IMBA scientists are not billed for core services, except for certain experiment-related consumables.

Beyond the core scientific facilities of the institute, IMBA laboratories are also financially supported to use of the core facilities of the Vienna Biocenter.

== Seminar and conferences ==
IMBA acts as a forum for academic exchange through its participation to a series of weekly internal Vienna Biocenter seminars, and

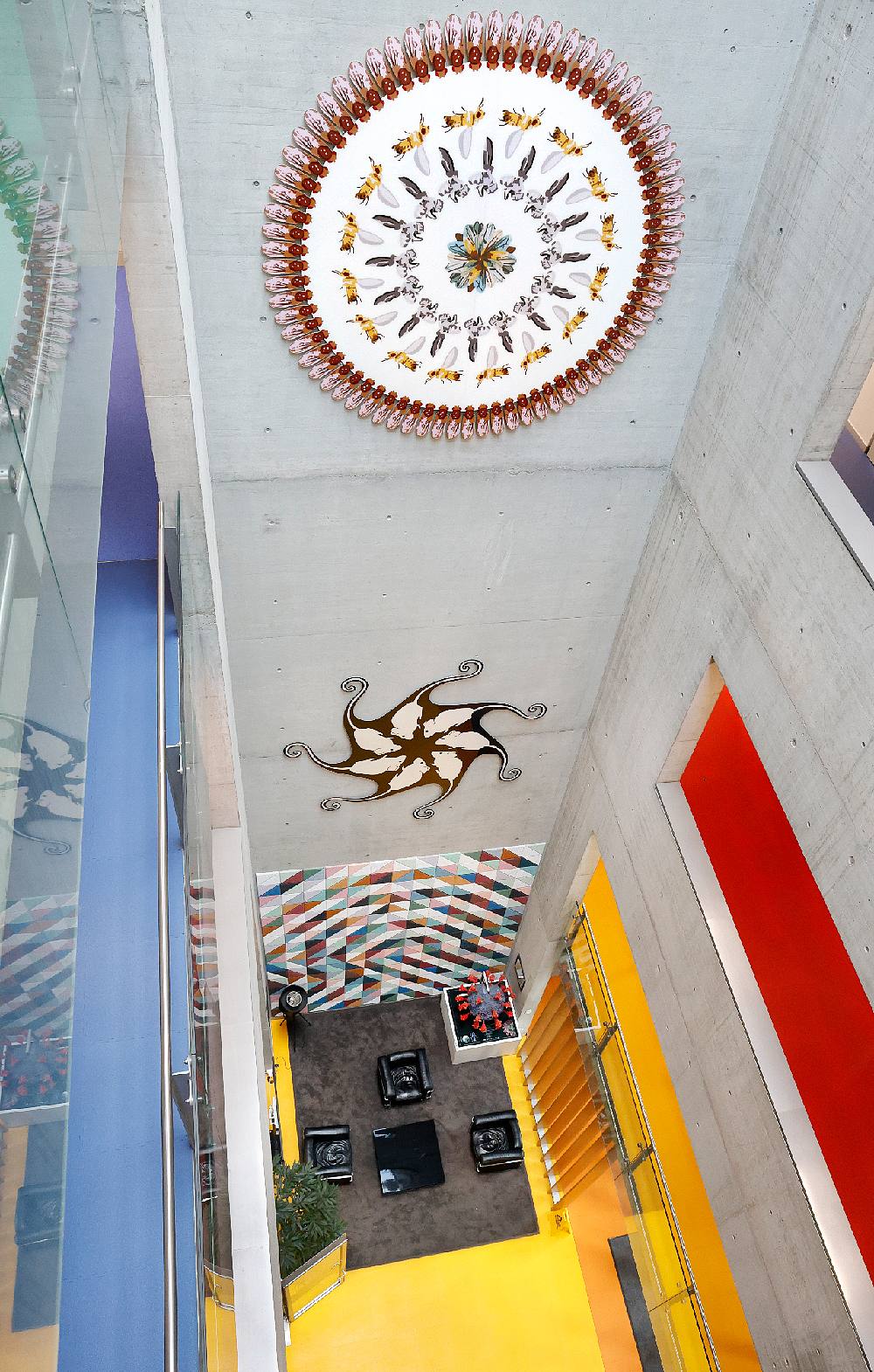
Foyer with artwork referencing model systems used at the Institute of Molecular Biotechnology (IMBA)

weekly guest lectures (termed "Vienna BioCenter lectures" and "Impromptus") from external, recognised or upcoming scientists.

IMBA and the IMP co-organize the yearly SY-Stem symposium focusing on the next generation of stem cell researchers.

== PhD program ==
The Vienna Biocenter PhD Program is an international PhD training program carried out jointly by four of the Vienna Biocenter research institutes (IMP, IMBA, GMI and Max Perutz Labs). Acceptance into the program is competitive and based on a formal selection procedure. There are two selections each year, deadlines are usually on April 30 and November 15. Participation in the program is a condition for doing a PhD at IMBA.

== Awards ==
IMBA has received recognition in the form of 25 ERC grants and through awards to its researchers.

Elly Tanaka, current scientific director, was elected a member of the Academia Europaea in 2015, of the European Molecular Biology Organisation in 2017, the Austrian Academy of Sciences in 2021, the National Academy of Sciences in 2023 and the German National Academy of Sciences Leopoldina in 2024. She was awarded the Ernst Schering Prize in 2017. In 2018, she was awarded the Erwin Schrödinger Prize of the Austrian Academy of Sciences for lifetime achievements. In 2020, she was awarded the FEBS | EMBO Women in Science Award, and the Wittgenstein Award in 2025.

Jürgen Knoblich, former interim scientific director, has received the Young Investigator Award of the European Molecular Biology Organization (EMBO), the Wittgenstein Award awarded by the Austrian Ministry of Science, the Erwin Schrödinger Prize by the Austrian Academy of Sciences, and the Sir Hans Krebs Medal of the Federation of European Biochemical Societies (FEBS). He is an elected member of the Pontifical Academy of Sciences, of the Academia Europaea, of the Mathematisch-naturwissenschaftlichen Klasse of the Austrian Academy of Sciences, of the European Molecular Biology Organisation (EMBO), and is on the board of directors of the International Society for Stem Cell Research. In 2015, he was awarded both an Advanced and a Proof-of-concept European Research Council (ERC) grant.

Josef Penninger, former scientific director, has been awarded the Ernst Jung Prize for Medicine by the Jung-Stiftung for Science and Research, a Descartes Prize for collaborative research by the European Commission and has received the Carus-Medal of the German Academy of Sciences Leopoldina. In 2012, Josef Penninger was awarded with an Innovator Award for the project "Novel Approaches to Breast Cancer Prevention and Inhibition of Metastases" through the US Department of Defense.

== Science communication ==
IMBA's science communication activities address different age groups and social backgrounds. They aim to inform the public about publicly funded research, contribute to societal dialogue and develop researchers' communication skills.

The Vienna Open Lab, opened in 2006 jointly with the association Open Science, then known as Dialog Gentechnik, offers hands-on laboratory activities for adults, children and young people. IMBA Researchers also visit schools through the "neugierige.köpfe" project to deliver workshops on regeneration and neurobiology. Together with the Vienna Open Lab and the organisation Hobby Lobby, IMBA offers science activities for children from disadvantaged backgrounds.

The institute participates in science festivals, children's university events and career exploration programmes such as Vienna's Girls' Day and UniStem Day. Researchers also contribute through public lectures, panel discussions and media appearances. Institute visits and the annual Health Science Forum, co-hosted with Merck, provide opportunities for dialogue with decision-makers. The "Science2Go" series, organised with partner institutes, introduces IMBA staff without a scientific background to research at the Vienna BioCenter.
