= Denise P. Barlow =

British geneticist

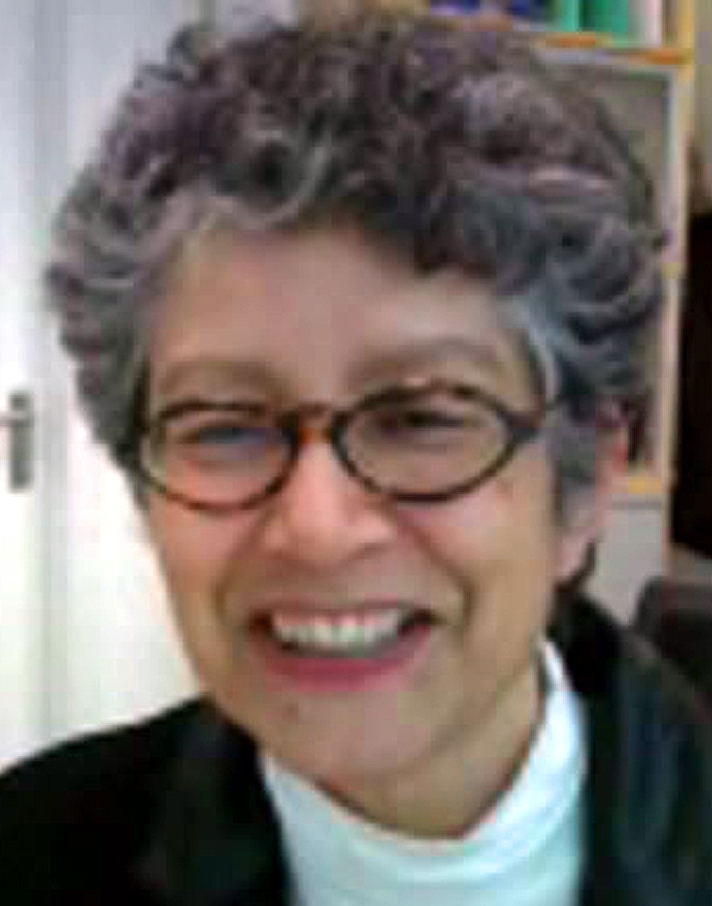
- Born: 31 January 1950; Yorkshire, England
- Died: 21 October 2017 (aged 67); Vienna, Austria
- Education: University of Warwick
- Awards: Erwin Schrödinger Prize (2014); Austrian Chapter Achievement Award-Medaille (2014)
- Scientific career
- Fields: Molecular Genetics
- Workplaces: Imperial Cancer Research Fund Laboratories (ICRF); European Molecular Biology Laboratory (EMBL); The Research Institute of Molecular Pathology (IMP); Netherlands Cancer Institute (NKI); Institute of Molecular Biology of the Austrian Academy of Sciences; Research Center for Molecular Medicine (CeMM); University of Vienna

Denise P. Barlow (31 January 1950 – 21 October 2017) was a British geneticist who worked in the field of epigenomics. Barlow was an elected member of European Molecular Biology Organization (EMBO), an honorary professor of genetics at the University of Vienna and recipient of the Erwin Schrödinger Prize of the Austrian Academy of Sciences. In 1991, she discovered the first mammalian imprinted gene, IGF2R, which codes for the insulin-like growth factor.

== Biography ==
=== Early years ===
Denise Barlow was born in Yorkshire, UK on 31 January 1950. When she was 16, she started a two-year pre-nursing course at a technical college. At the age of 18, she trained and worked for four years as a state registered nurse (SRN) in the United Kingdom. During this time, she decided to enroll at a university to learn more about human physiology and diseases, but had to attend another technical college to take A-levels first.

=== Research work ===
At the age of 25, Barlow started to study at the University of Reading for a three-year BSc Honors course in Zoology with Physiology and Biochemistry. After her graduation, Barlow took up a PhD position at Warwick University, supervised by Derek Burke, to study the interferon response to virus infections in mouse embryos. She obtained a PhD in the area of mouse developmental biology in 1981.

Barlow was invited by Brigid Hogan of the Imperial Cancer Research Fund Laboratories in London to work in her laboratory on isolating genes expressed in the very early stages of embryonic development. After Barlow met Hans Lehrach at a scientific meeting in Cold Spring Harbor, she joined his laboratory at the European Molecular Biology Laboratory (EMBL) in Heidelberg, Germany, to isolate mutated mouse genes using techniques developed in this lab.

In 1988, Barlow joined the newly founded Research Institute of Molecular Pathology (IMP) in Vienna, where she worked as a group leader until 1996. During this time in 1991, she discovered the first imprinted gene in mice, IGF2R.

After the IMP, Barlow moved to a group leader position at the Netherlands Cancer Institute in Amsterdam in 1996. Thereafter, she continued her work at the Institute of Molecular Biology of the Austrian Academy of Sciences in Salzburg.

In 2003, Barlow joined the Research Center for Molecular Medicine of the Austrian Academy of Sciences (CeMM) as a founding member, where she continued her epigenetic research as principal investigator until her retirement in 2015. In 2014, she received the Erwin Schrödinger Prize, worth 15.000 Euros, for her lifetime achievements. This prize, which was endowed in 1958, is the most prestigious award of the Austrian Academy of Sciences. The last published work of Barlow's former group described the first complete allelome, adding to previous discoveries of Barlow and her lab such as the first imprinted gene and the first imprinted non-coding RNA, which controls imprinted silencing

Barlow was appointed a member of the European Molecular Biology Organization (EMBO) in 1995 and has served on the EMBO Science and Society Committee since 1998. There she was appointed chairwoman of this committee since 2002. She advocated better opportunities for female scientists in leading positions at universities and research institutes.

== Denise P. Barlow Award ==
The Denise P. Barlow Award for Best Thesis on Biological Mechanisms was created by the four research institutes with which Denise Barlow was closely associated while working in Vienna. The yearly academic talent award in her name was launched by the Research Institute of Molecular Pathology (IMP), where Barlow was a group leader, the Max Perutz Labs (MFPL), where she has been a professor, the Institute of Molecular Biotechnology (IMBA), which has provided laboratory space for some time, and the Research Center for Molecular Medicine (CeMM), where she spent the last ten years of her career as principal investigator.

The committee which awards the prize worth €5000 once a year consists of seven people, the four scientific directors of the institutes and three additional scientists from various research areas. Together with the money prize a certificate featuring the name of the awardee, the prize and Denise P. Barlow's portrait (drawn by the Viennese artist Lisl Spurny) is given. The awardees must have performed their PhD studies in one of the institutes and their thesis should have provided insights into a biological mechanism in line with Denise Barlow's scientific interests.

The first winners of the award in 2019 have been Julia Batki, an alumna from Julius Brennecke’s laboratory at IMBA for her thesis "Nuclear small RNA-guided silencing of transposable elements in Drosophila melanogaster" and Matthias Muhar, an IMP alumnus from the laboratory of Johannes Zuber for his thesis "Systematic dissection of gene-regulatory programs in leukemia".

== Honors and awards ==
- Elected EMBO member (1995)
- Honorary professorship of genetics at the University of Vienna
- Erwin Schrödinger Prize of the Austrian Academy of Sciences (2014)
- EMBO/EMBL Austrian Chapter Achievement Award Medal (2014) for her lifetime achievements

== Publications (selection) ==
- Barlow, D (2015). "Denise Barlow: a career in epigenetics". RNA Biol. 12 (2): 105–8. doi:10.1080/15476286.2015.1018711. PMC 4615223. PMID 25779649.
- Latos, PA; Pauler, FM; Koerner, MV; Şenergin, HB; Hudson, QJ; Stocsits, RR; Allhoff, W; Stricker, SH; Klement, RM; Warczok, KE; Aumayr, K; Pasierbek, P; Barlow, DP (2012). "Airn transcriptional overlap, but not its lncRNA products, induces imprinted Igf2r silencing". Science. 338 (6113): 1469–72. Bibcode:2012Sci...338.1469L. doi:10.1126/science.1228110. PMID 23239737. S2CID 1439557.
- Barlow, Denise (1989). "Pulsed-field gel electrophoresis". Genome. 31: 465–466. doi:10.1139/g89-084.
- Sleutels, F; Barlow, DP (2002). "5 the origins of genomic imprinting in mammals". Homology Effects. Adv Genet. Vol. 46. pp. 119–63. doi:10.1016/s0065-2660(02)46006-3. ISBN 978-0-12-017646-5. PMID 11931223.
- Barlow, DP (1997). "Competition--a common motif for the imprinting mechanism?". EMBO J. 16 (23): 6899–905. doi:10.1093/emboj/16.23.6899. PMC 1170293. PMID 9384569.
- Barlow, D. P. (1995). "Gametic Imprinting in Mammals". Science. 270 (5242): 1610–1613. Bibcode:1995Sci...270.1610B. doi:10.1126/science.270.5242.1610. PMID 7502071. S2CID 45647851.
- Barlow, DP; Stöger, R; Herrmann, BG; Saito, K; Schweifer, N (1991). "The mouse insulin-like growth factor type-2 receptor is imprinted and closely linked to the Tme locus". Nature. 349 (6304): 84–7. Bibcode:1991Natur.349...84B. doi:10.1038/349084a0. PMID 1845916. S2CID 4368087.
- Barlow, Denise P.; Lehrach, Hans (1987). "Genetics by gel electrophoresis: the impact of pulsed field gel electrophoresis on mammalian genetics". Trends in Genetics. 3: 167–171. doi:10.1016/0168-9525(87)90219-8.
- Barlow, DP; Randle, BJ; Burke, DC (1984). "Interferon synthesis in the early post-implantation mouse embryo". Differentiation. 27 (1–3): 229–35. doi:10.1111/j.1432-0436.1984.tb01433.x. PMID 6209188.
