= Jürgen Knoblich =

Austrian molecular biologist

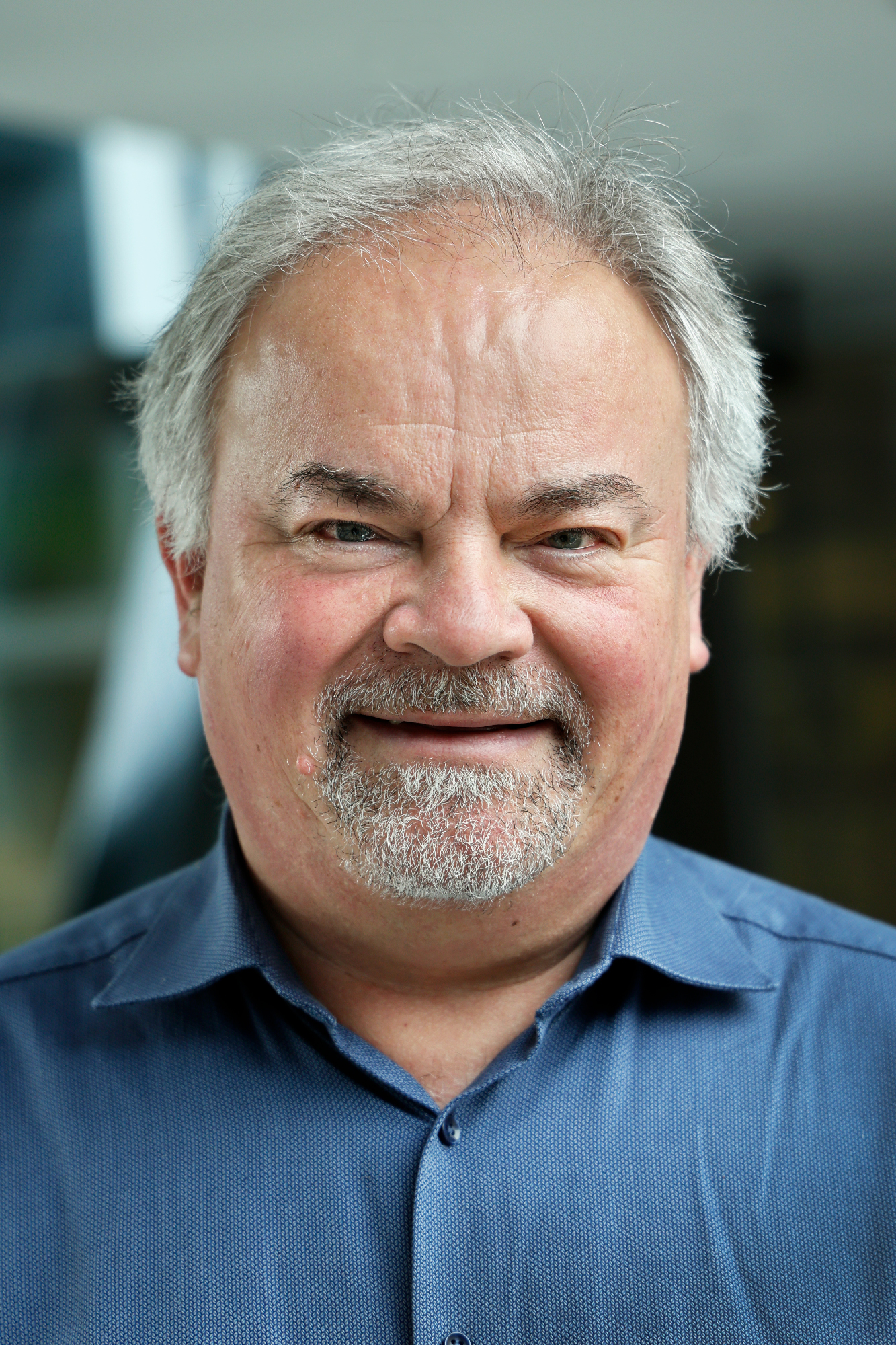
- Born: 1963 (age 62–63); Memmingen, Germany
- Citizenship: German
- Known for: cerebral organoids
- Awards: Wittgenstein Award, EMBO Member, ERC Advanced Grant
- Scientific career
- Fields: Molecular biology
- Institutions: University of California in San Francisco, Research Institute of Molecular Pathology (IMP), Institute of Molecular Biotechnology IMBA
- Website: https://www.oeaw.ac.at/imba/research/juergen-knoblich

Jürgen Arthur Knoblich (born 1963 in Memmingen, Germany) is a German molecular biologist known mainly as a pioneer in developing cerebral organoids. Since 2005, he is a Senior Group Leader at the Institute of Molecular Biotechnology (IMBA) of the Austrian Academy of Sciences at the Vienna Biocenter, where he acted as interim scientific director from 2018 to 2024.

== Education and career ==
Knoblich studied biochemistry at the University of Tübingen and molecular biology at University College London. In 1989 he transferred to the Max Planck Institute for Developmental Biology in Tübingen, where he completed his doctoral thesis in 1994 on the role of Cyclin proteins in controlling cell cycle progression during development. In 1994 he became a postdoctoral researcher at the University of California, San Francisco, where he worked with Yuh Nung Jan until 1997. Upon his return to Europe he joined the Research Institute of Molecular Pathology (IMP) in Vienna, Austria as a group leader. In 2004, he moved to the newly founded Institute of Molecular Biotechnology (IMBA) in Vienna, where he was appointed deputy director in 2005 and acted as interim scientific director from 2018 to 2024. Both the IMP and IMBA are part of the Vienna Biocenter. Since 2021 he is chair in synthetic biology at the Medical University of Vienna.

== Research focus ==
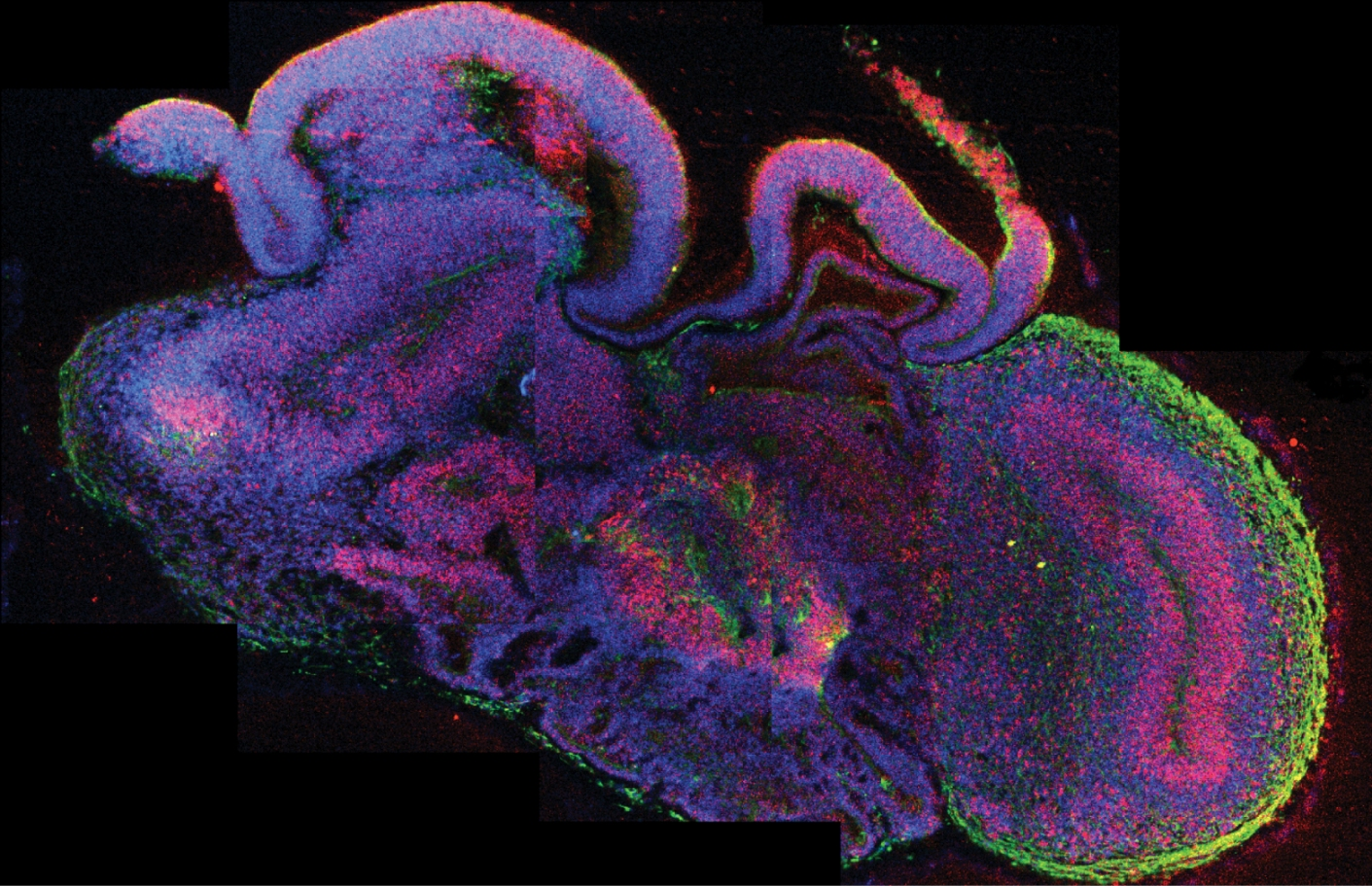
Cross section of a complete cerebral organoid with different brain regions. Cells are shown in blue, neural stem cells in red and neurons in green.

Knoblich’s research is known for the development of an organoid model of early human brain development, together with his postdoctoral fellow Madeline A. Lancaster. His team was the first to demonstrate that organoids derived from human pluripotent stem cells (iPS cells) can be used to model human disease, a breakthrough that was ranked within the top 10 scientific discoveries in 2013 by Science magazine.

This model is now commonly referred to as “cerebral organoids”. It recapitulates early steps of human brain development during the first trimester and has been used by many other research groups. Organoid models enable researches to perform studies directly on human tissues that can be grown from any human individual. They allow scientists to efficiently transfer research findings from fruit flies and animal models to human tissues and thus to investigate heritable genetic brain diseases on human tissue.

Since 2013 his team have developed cerebral organoids. In 2017, they showed that by fusing two separately patterned organoids it is possible to study interactions between distinct brain areas.

Previously, his research had also centered around the mechanisms of brain development. His were neuronal stem cells, their asymmetrical cell division and processes of growth control. Building on his post-doctoral work, Knoblich and his colleagues characterized a complete mechanism for asymmetrical stem cell division in neural stem cells of the fruitfly Drosophila. Their results were published in a series of seminal papers, including a report in Cell in 2008. Until then, it was unknown how stem cells can separate into a self-renewing daughter cell and a specialized differentiating cell at the same time. Asymmetric cell division is based on a reaction cascade in which a cascade of molecular switches are activated or inactivated. Proteins in this cascade are either turned “on” or “off” depending on their phosphorylation state, starting with a kinase that transfers the first phosphate residue, named aurora kinase A. Aurora kinase A is often over-expressed in tumor cells, alongside other molecules that also play a role in the process of asymmetric cell division. Since stem cell mitosis is a highly conserved process, results found in fruit flies can be transferred to humans and thereby help to gain insights into general tumor neogenesis

Additionally, Knoblich and his group were the first to carry out a genome-wide in vivo RNAi screen to demonstrate for the first time, that it is possible to simultaneously analyze gene functions across the whole genome of an organism in a tissue specific manner. This was achieved using a fruit fly gene bank generated at IMBA by Barry Dickson, in which every single one of the approximately 13,000 fruit fly genes can be inactivated in any cell independently. With this method, Knoblich could further investigate brain tumor development in fruit flies. Recent findings suggest that tumors can be based on stem cells, that keep their unique stem cell characteristics and thus uncontrollably divide, without ever differentiating into specific somatic cell types. This lack of differentiation is caused by Brat, a gene that has been identified by Knoblich and his team.

== Awards and honours ==
- 2025: State Prize for the Promotion of Alternatives to Animal Testing
- 2021: Appointed Chair in Synthetic Biology at the Medical University of Vienna
- 2021: City of Vienna Award for outstanding scientific contributions
- 2021: Archdiocese of Vienna Kardinal-Innitzer-Würdigungspreis
- 2020: Member of the Pontifical Academy of Sciences
- 2015: Proof of Concept Grant - European Research Council (ERC)
- 2015: Sir Hans Krebs Medal of the Federation of European Biochemical Societies (FEBS)
- 2015: Advanced Research Grant - European Research Council (ERC)
- 2013: Elected member of the "mathematisch-naturwissenschaftliche Klasse" of the Austrian Academy of Sciences
- 2012: Erwin Schrödinger Prize of the Austrian Academy of Sciences
- 2012: Elected member of the Academia Europaea
- 2009: Advanced Research Grant – European Research Council (ERC)
- 2009: Wittgenstein Award
- 2003: Early Career Award of the European Life Scientist Organization (ELSO)
- 2001: Young Investigator Award of the European Molecular Biology Organization (EMBO)

== Selected publications ==
- Lancaster, MA.; Corsini, NS.; Wolfinger, S.; Gustafson, EH.; Phillips, AW.; Burkard, TR.; Otani, T.; Livesey, FJ.; Knoblich, JA. (2017). "Guided self-organization and cortical plate formation in human brain organoids". Nat Biotechnol. 35 (7): 659–666. doi:10.1038/nbt.3906. PMC 5824977. PMID 28562594.
- Bagley, JA.; Reumann, D.; Bian, S.; Lévi-Strauss, J.; Knoblich, JA. (2017). "Fused cerebral organoids model interactions between brain regions". Nat Methods. 14 (7): 743–751. doi:10.1038/nmeth.4304. PMC 5540177. PMID 28504681.
- Homem, CC.; Steinmann, V.; Burkard, TR.; Jais, A.; Esterbauer, H.; Knoblich, JA. (2014). "Ecdysone and mediator change energy metabolism to terminate proliferation in Drosophila neural stem cells". Cell. 158 (4): 874–88. doi:10.1016/j.cell.2014.06.024. PMID 25126791. S2CID 8710265.
- Eroglu, E.; Burkard, TR.; Jiang, Y.; Saini, N.; Homem, CC.; Reichert, H.; Knoblich, JA. (2014). "SWI/SNF complex prevents lineage reversion and induces temporal patterning in neural stem cells". Cell. 156 (6): 1259–73. doi:10.1016/j.cell.2014.01.053. PMID 24630726. S2CID 18230831.
- Lancaster, MA.; Renner, M.; Martin, CA.; Wenzel, D.; Bicknell, LS.; Hurles, ME.; Homfray, T.; Penninger, JM.; Jackson, AP.; Knoblich, JA. (2013). "Cerebral organoids model human brain development and microcephaly". Nature. 501 (7467): 373–9. Bibcode:2013Natur.501..373L. doi:10.1038/nature12517. PMC 3817409. PMID 23995685.
