= Elly Tanaka =

American biochemist

Elly Margaret Tanaka
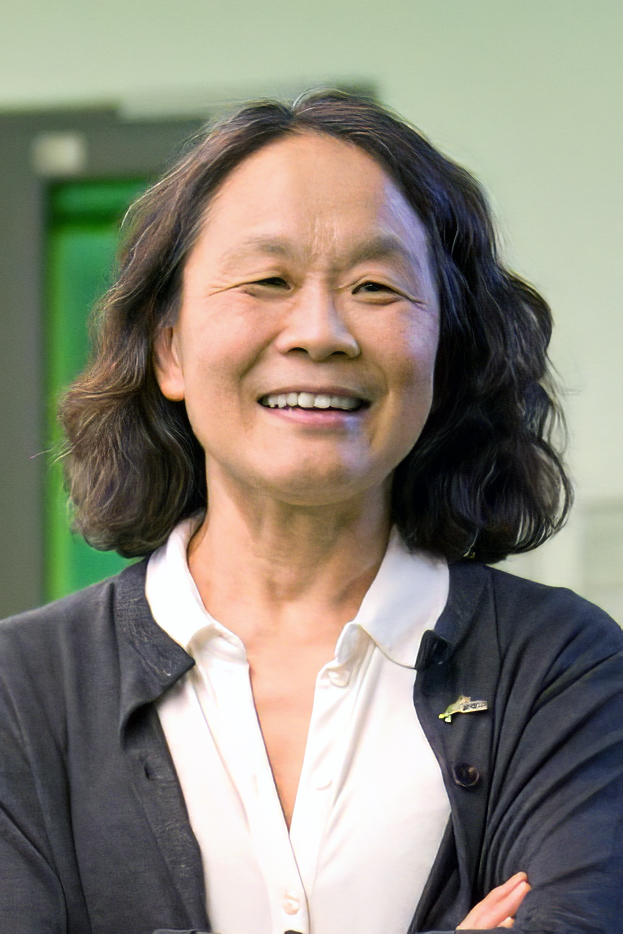
- Born: Elly Margaret Tanaka
- Education: Harvard University (BSc); University of California, San Francisco (PhD)
- Awards: Ernst Schering Prize (2017); EMBO Member (2017); Erwin Schrödinger Prize (2018); FEBS / EMBO Women in Science Award (2020); Schleiden Medal (2025); Wittgenstein Award (2025)
- Scientific career
- Fields: molecular biology, regeneration
- Workplaces: University College London; Max Planck Institute of Molecular Cell Biology and Genetics; Center for Regenerative Therapies Dresden (CRTD); Research Institute of Molecular Pathology (IMP); Institute of Molecular Biotechnology (IMBA)
- Thesis: (1993)
- Doctoral advisor: Marc W. Kirschner
- Website: www.oeaw.ac.at/imba/groups/elly-tanaka

Elly Margaret Tanaka, FRS (born in Boston, Massachusetts, in 1965) is an American-Austrian biochemist and Scientific Director at the Institute of Molecular Biotechnology of the Austrian Academy of Sciences (IMBA) at the Vienna Biocenter, Austria. Tanaka studies the molecular cell biology of limb and spinal cord regeneration in salamanders and other systems as well as the evolution of regeneration.

== Early life and education ==
Tanaka was born in Boston (Massachusetts), and obtained a bachelor's degree in biochemistry from Harvard University in 1987 and a PhD from the University of California, San Francisco in 1993, where she had worked in the lab of Marc W. Kirschner. She then became a postdoctoral researcher in the lab of Jeremy Brockes at University College London and Ludwig Institute.

== Scientific career ==
Tanaka started her own lab at the Max Planck Institute of Molecular Cell Biology and Genetics (MPI-CBG) in Dresden (Germany) in 1999. In 2008, she became a professor at the Center for Regenerative Therapies Dresden (CRTD) of the Technische Universität Dresden. She became director of the center in 2014, before becoming senior scientist at the Research Institute of Molecular Pathology (IMP) in Vienna in 2016. In 2024, Tanaka joined the Institute of Molecular Biotechnology of the Austrian Academy of Sciences (IMBA) as Scientific Director.

== Research ==
Tanaka studies the cellular and molecular mechanisms that enable salamanders to regenerate complex tissues, using the axolotl (Ambystoma mexicanum) as her principal model organism. Her laboratory developed methods for fluorescent cell labelling, live imaging, transgenesis and genome editing in the axolotl, enabling researchers to trace the origins and behaviour of cells during regeneration and investigate the functions of individual genes. Together with collaborators, her group sequenced and annotated the axolotl genome, published in 2018, providing a resource for investigating the genetic regulation of regeneration.

A central contribution of Tanaka's research has been to establish the cellular origins of regenerated limbs. In 2009, her group showed that cells contributing to the blastema—the population of progenitor cells that forms at an amputation site—largely retain restrictions on the types of tissue they can produce, rather than reverting to a universally pluripotent state. In 2018, her team demonstrated that connective tissue cells called fibroblasts lose their specialised characteristics and give rise to progenitor cells during limb regeneration. This established that these regenerative cells arise from differentiated tissue rather than a reserve of dedicated stem cells. Comparisons with frogs, which cannot regenerate complete limbs as adults, linked their limited regenerative capacity to incomplete fibroblast dedifferentiation.

Tanaka's group also investigated how cells retain information about their position within a limb and use it to reconstruct missing structures. In 2024, the team showed that connective tissue cells at different limb positions have distinct chromatin states, providing an epigenetic basis for positional information. In 2025, her group identified a role for the transcription factor Hand2 in maintaining positional memory along the limb's thumb-to-little-finger axis. Its persistent activity in posterior connective tissue cells before injury helps organise the signals that pattern the regenerating limb.

Beyond limb regeneration, Tanaka's research encompasses the spinal cord, brain, heart and retina. Her laboratory has shown that axolotl heart muscle cells resume division following injury and is investigating how neuronal circuits are rebuilt during brain regeneration. The group has also generated retinal pigment epithelium from human embryonic stem cells to investigate potential approaches to repairing retinal damage.

== Science communication and public engagement ==
Tanaka advocates public engagement as a responsibility of publicly funded researchers, a contribution to societal debate and a way for scientists to broaden communication skills. She has supported IMBA outreach, including school workshops, science festivals and programmes for disadvantaged children. Tanaka uses axolotl regeneration to explain basic research and its potential medical relevance, and frequently appears in Austrian and international media. She has also called for a national science communication strategy in Austria to reach diverse audiences.

== Awards and honours ==
- 2026: Fellow of the Royal Society (FRS)
- 2025: Schleiden Medal
- 2025: Wittgenstein Award
- 2024: Elected to the German National Academy of Sciences Leopoldina
- 2023: Elected to the National Academy of Sciences
- 2021: Elected to the Austrian Academy of Sciences
- 2020: FEBS | EMBO Women in Science Award
- 2018: Erwin Schrödinger Prize of the Austrian Academy of Sciences
- 2017: Honorary Professor, TU Dresden
- 2017: Elected member of European Molecular Biology Organization
- 2017: Ernst Schering Prize
- 2017: Female Scientist Award, German Stem Cell Network
- 2015: Elected member of the Academia Europaea

== Selected publications ==
- Otsuki L, Plattner SA, Taniguchi-Sugiura Y, Falcon F, Tanaka EM (June 2025). "Molecular basis of positional memory in limb regeneration". Nature. 642 (8068): 730–738. Bibcode:2025Natur.642..730O. doi:10.1038/s41586-025-09036-5. PMC 12176643. PMID 40399677.
- Gerber T, Murawala P, Knapp D, Masselink W, Schuez M, Hermann S, Gac-Santel M, Nowoshilow S, Kageyama J, Khattak S, Currie JD, Camp JG, Tanaka EM, Treutlein B (2018). "Single-cell analysis uncovers convergence of cell identities during axolotl limb regeneration". Science. 362 (6413) eaaq0681. Bibcode:2018Sci...362..681G. doi:10.1126/science.aaq0681. PMC 6669047. PMID 30262634.
- Nowoshilow, S; Schloissnig, S; Fei, JF; Dahl, A; Pang, AWC; Pippel, M; Winkler, S; Hastie, AR; Young, G; Roscito, JG; Falcon, F; Knapp, D; Powell, S; Cruz, A; Cao, H; Habermann, B; Hiller, M; Tanaka, EM; Myers, EW (2018). "The axolotl genome and the evolution of key tissue formation regulators". Nature. 554 (7690): 50–55. Bibcode:2018Natur.554...50N. doi:10.1038/nature25458. PMID 29364872.
- Nacu E, Gromberg E, Oliveira CR, Drechsel D, Tanaka EM (2016). "FGF8 and SHH substitute for anterior-posterior tissue interactions to induce limb regeneration". Nature. 533 (7603): 407–410. Bibcode:2016Natur.533..407N. doi:10.1038/nature17972. PMID 27120163.
- Kragl M, Knapp D, Nacu E, Khattak S, Maden M, Epperlein HH, Tanaka EM (2009). "Cells keep a memory of their tissue origin during axolotl limb regeneration". Nature. 460 (7251): 60–65. Bibcode:2009Natur.460...60K. doi:10.1038/nature08152. PMID 19571878.
