= Renée Schroeder =

Austrian researcher and university professor

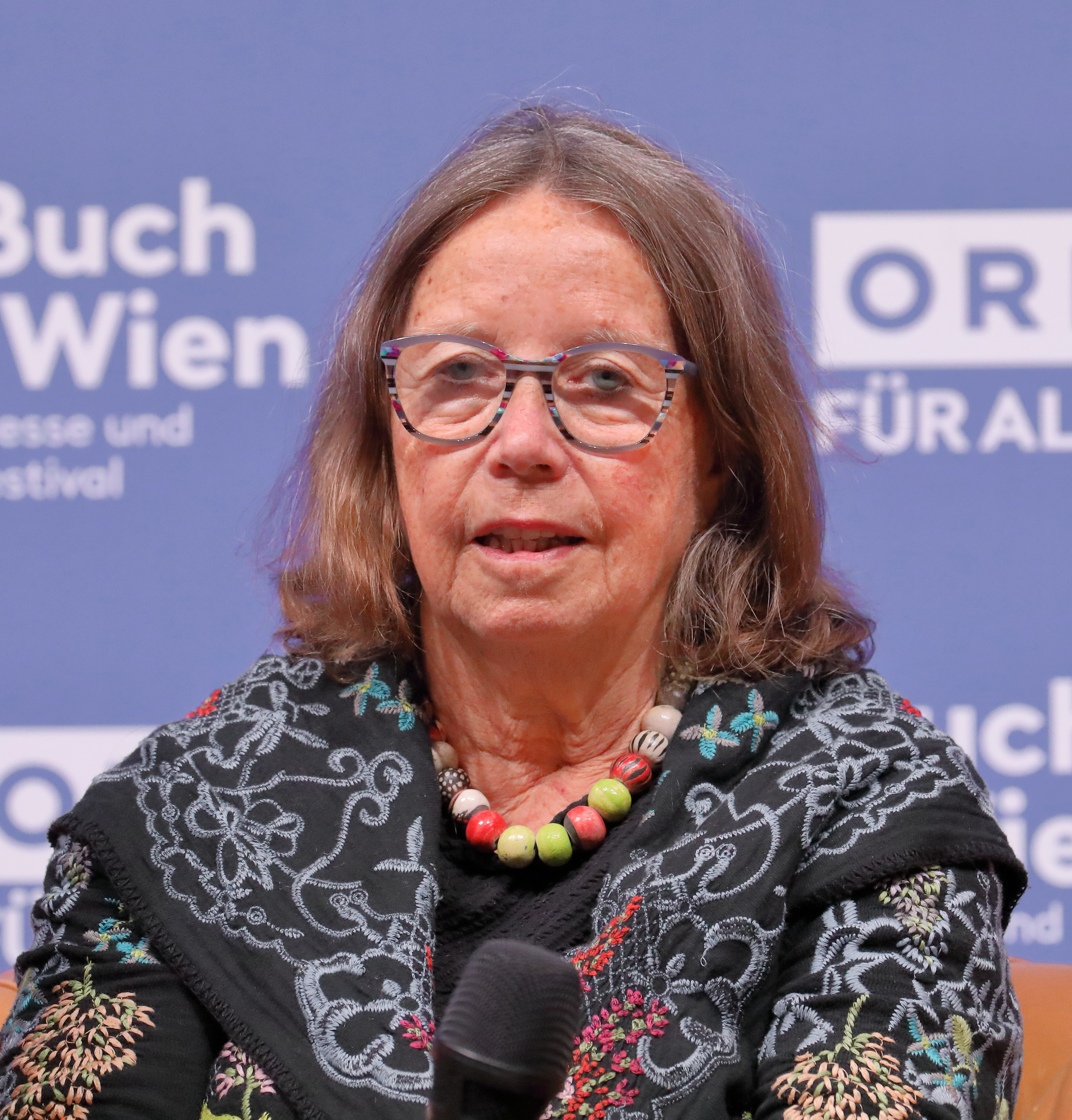
- Schroeder in 2025
- Born: 18 May 1953 (age 72); João Monlevade, Brazil
- Citizenship: Austrian
- Known for: Biochemistry
- Awards: 1984 Theodor Körner Prize, 2003 Wittgenstein Award, 2006 Grand Decoration of Honour for Services to the Republic of Austria
- Scientific career
- Institutions: Austrian Science Fund, University of Vienna

Renée Schroeder (born 18 May 1953) is an Austrian researcher and university professor at the Department of Biochemistry at the Max F. Perutz Laboratories of the University of Vienna and the Medical University of Vienna.

== Life ==
Renée Schroeder was born in João Monlevade, Brazil where her father worked as an electrical engineer. They left Brazil when she was 14.

Her research is in the field of biochemistry, especially on RNA (ribonucleic acid). From June 2001 to November 2005, she was on the Bioethics Commission, launched by the Austrian government. From 2005 to 2010, she was Vice-President of the Fund for Scientific Research and in 2010 member of the Council for Research and Technology Development since September.

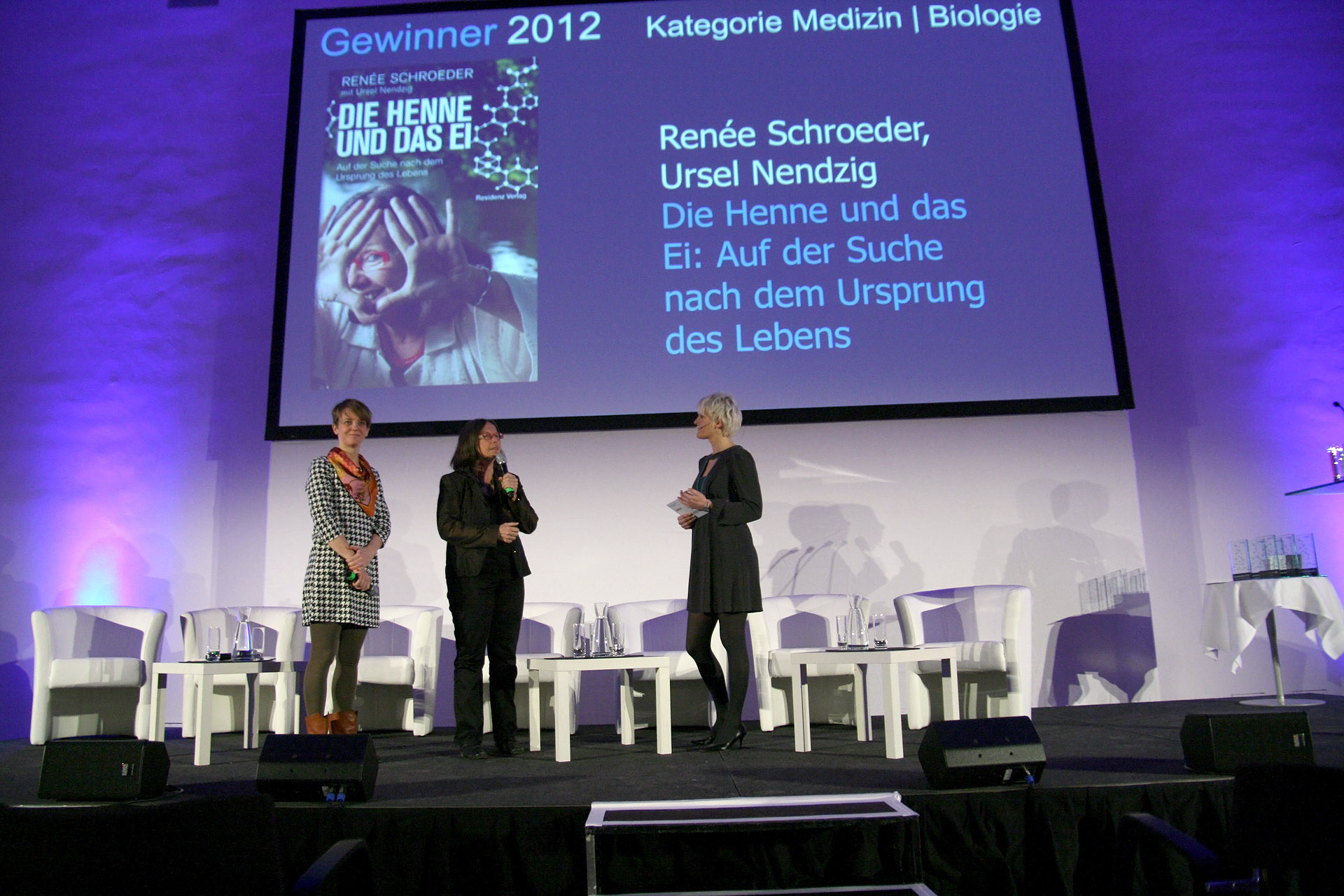
Schroeder at the Award ceremony for the Science book of the Year

She has also repeatedly been critical of the Austrian education and research policy. In particular, she criticized discrimination against women within the university structures, so she is particularly involved in the promotion of women in science. This long-lasting commitment earned her the 2001 Special Honor Award "For Women in Science", donated by UNESCO and the company L'Oreal, and in 2007, she was awarded the Vienna Women's Prize (Wiener Frauenpreis). Schroeder also spoke frequently about the church and religion as well as about women and their worldview.

In 2003, Schroeder was elected the second woman member of the Division of Mathematics and the Natural Sciences of the Austrian Academy of Sciences. In May 2012, Renée Schroeder resigned from the Academy, to protest the lack of promotion of excellence and the high proportion of Catholic German Student Fraternity members in the Academy.

On 1 September 2022, she was appointed honorary senator at the University of Vienna because of her "outstanding commitment to the university and to the fulfillment of its scientific tasks."

== Awards & Honours ==
- 1984: Theodor Körner Prize
- 2001: Special Honour Award "For Women in Science"
- 2002: Austrian Scientist of the Year (elected by the Austrian Science Journalists).
- 2003: Wittgenstein Award
- 2005: Prize of the City of Vienna for Natural and Technical Sciences
- 2006: Grand Decoration of Honour for Services to the Republic of Austria
- 2007: Vienna Women's Prize (Wiener Frauenpreis)
- 2011: Eduard Buchner Prize
- 2012: Austrian Science Book of the Year 2012 Award, category Medicine and Biology, for Die Henne und das Ei. Auf der Suche nach dem Ursprung des Lebens (The Hen and the Egg. In search of the origin of life)
- 2015: Golden Decoration of Honour for Services to the Province of Vienna
- 2017: Austrian Science Book of the Year 2017 Award for Die Erfindung des Menschen: Wie wir die Evolution überlisten (The invention of man: How we outwit evolution)
- 2022: Honorary senator (Ehrensenatorin) at the University of Vienna
