= Gerlich =

Gerlich is a surname. Notable people with the surname include:

- Daniel Gerlich (born 1972), German cell biologist
- Fritz Gerlich (1883–1934), German journalist and historian
- Jakob "Jackie" Gerlich (1917–1960), American dwarf actor and circus entertainer
- Krista Gerlich, American basketball coach
