= Josef Penninger =

Austrian biomedical researcher

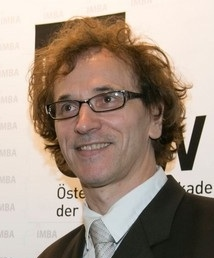
- Born: 5 September 1964 (age 61); Gurten, Upper Austria
- Education: University of Innsbruck
- Awards: Descartes Prize (2006); Ernst Jung Prize (2007); Wittgenstein-Preis (2014)
- Scientific career
- Workplaces: Amgen; University of Toronto; Institute of Molecular Biotechnology; University of British Columbia
- Thesis: Phenotypical and functional analysis of intrathymic nurse (TCN)-Lymphocytes (1990)
- Doctoral advisor: Georg Wick
- Website: www.imba.oeaw.ac.at/research/josef-penninger/

Josef Penninger (born 5 September 1964) is an Austrian biomedical researcher specialising in molecular immunology. He was the scientific director of the Institute of Molecular Biotechnology located at the Vienna Biocenter until 2018. In February 2018, he announced his decision to leave Vienna and become the head of the Life Sciences Institute of the University of British Columbia in Vancouver, British Columbia, Canada.

The asteroid 48801 Penninger is named in his honour.
