= Gregor Mendel Institute =

Research institute in Vienna, Austria

Gregor Mendel Institute of Molecular Plant Biology (GMI)
- Gregor Mendel Institut für Molekulare Pflanzenbiologie
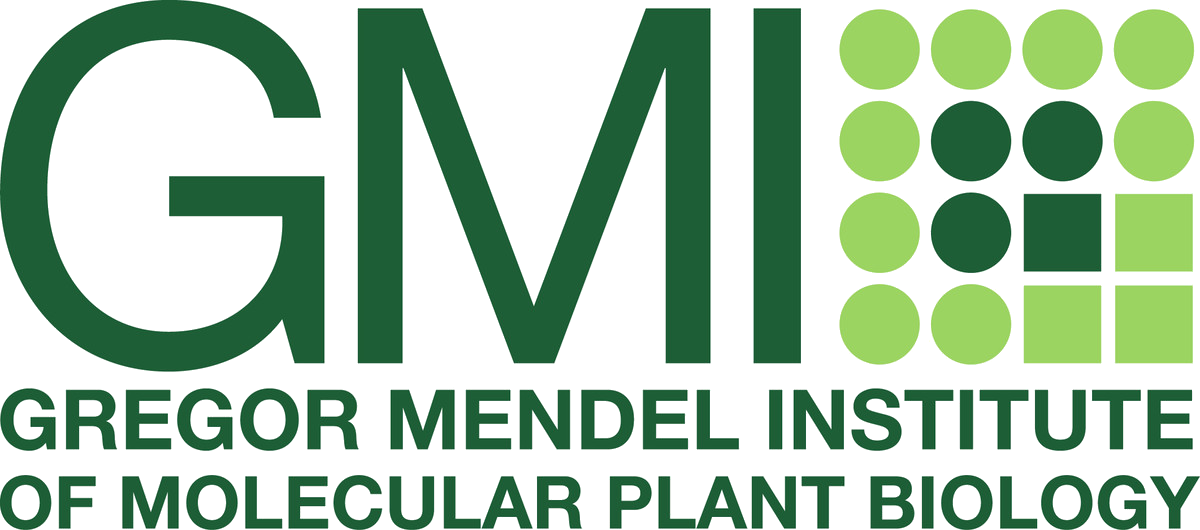
- GMI Logo

Agency overview
- Formed: 2000
- Jurisdiction: Austria
- Headquarters: Vienna, Austria
- Employees: 130
- Agency executives: Liam Dolan, Scientific director; Markus Kiess, CEO
- Parent agency: Austrian Academy of Sciences
- Website: http://www.gmi.oeaw.ac.at

The Gregor Mendel Institute of Molecular Plant Biology (GMI) is a basic research institute in Vienna, Austria. It was founded in 2000 by the Austrian Academy of Sciences (ÖAW) to promote cutting-edge research in the field of molecular plant biology. The GMI employs about 130 people. Its founding director was Dieter Schweizer, and the current scientific director is Liam Dolan. The institute is named after Gregor Mendel, who is also known as the "Father of genetics," due to his scientific work and the fact that he studied at the University of Vienna in the mid-19th century.

== Research ==
Research is conducted at GMI on numerous aspects of molecular biology. These include basic mechanisms of epigenetics, cell biology, plant pathogens interactions, developmental biology and population genetics.

There are eight independent research groups as of March 2023, led by:

- Frédéric Berger: Chromatin architecture and function
- Yasin Dagdas: Autophagy mediated cellular quality control mechanisms in plants
- Liam Dolan: Development and evolution of land plants
- Nick Irwin: Horizontal gene transfer in plants and algae
- Yan Ma: Insect-induced plant galls
- Arturo Marí-Ordóñez: Mechanisms of recognition and silencing of transposons in plants
- Magnus Nordborg: Population genetics
- Silvia Ramundo: Chloroplast biogenesis and protein quality control

== Scientific Advisory Board ==
A Scientific Advisory Board (SAB) evaluates research at GMI on an annual basis. The SAB consists of independent international experts. Their main task is to provide feedback on the quality of scientific work to the Institute's management and the Austrian Academy of Sciences.

Composition (as of March 2023):

- Richard Durbin, Department of Genetics, University of Cambridge (UK)
- Niko Geldner, Department of Plant Molecular Biology, University of Lausanne (Switzerland)
- Harmit Malik, Division of Basic Sciences, Fred Hutchinson Cancer Research Center, Seattle (US)
- Krishna Niyogi, Plant and Microbial Biology, University of California, Berkeley (US)
- Keiko Sugimoto, RIKEN Center for Sustainable Resource Science (Japan)
- Nick Talbot, The Sainsbury Laboratory, Norwich (UK)
- Miltos Tsiantis, Department of Comparative Development and Genetics, Max Planck Institute for Plant Breeding Research (Germany)
- Susan Wessler, Department of Botany and Plant Sciences, University of California, Riverside (US)

== Scientific Infrastructure ==
The Institute is located together with other research institutes at the Vienna Biocenter in Vienna's 3rd district. The campus has over 1,900 scientists from more than 70 countries. Also located at the Vienna BioCenter are the Institute of Molecular Biotechnology (IMBA), the Research Institute of Molecular Pathology (IMP) and Max Perutz Labs Vienna - a joint institute of the University of Vienna and the Medical University of Vienna. The research groups also use services provided by the Vienna BioCenter Core Facilities (VBCF) such as high-throughput plant phenotyping and next generation sequencing.

== Science Communication ==
The GMI aims to bring the topics of plants and plant research closer to the general public. For this purpose, the GMI has developed quiz search mobile games on the topic of plants in Vienna (Botanic Quest, Naturdenkmäler Wien Quest) as well as an information platform for children (gmi4kids).
