= Magnus Nordborg =

- Education: Lund University (BSc); Stanford University (PhD)
- Scientific career
- Fields: Population genetics
- Workplaces: Lund University; University of Southern California; Gregor Mendel Institute
- Thesis: Deterministic models of natural selection (1994)
- Doctoral advisor: Marcus Feldman

Magnus Nordborg is a biologist specialising in population genetics. He is senior group leader at the Gregor Mendel Institute of the Austrian Academy of Sciences, located at the Vienna Biocenter.

== Awards and honours ==
In 2003, Nordborg received the Sloan Research Fellowship.

He was elected a fellow of the American Association for the Advancement of Science in 2010. In 2015, he was elected a member of the European Molecular Biology Organization.

Since 2013, he is a corresponding member of the Austrian Academy of Sciences.

== Prominent Students and Collaborators ==
- Noah Rosenberg
- Simon Tavaré
- Joy Bergelson
- Jinal Jhaveri
