= Christian Krattenthaler =

Austrian mathematician (born 1958)

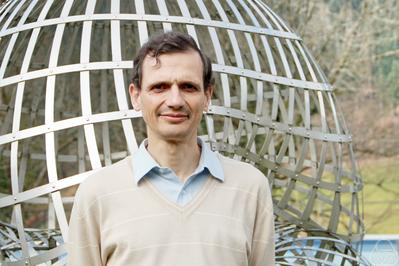
Christian Krattenthaler

Christian Friedrich Krattenthaler (born 8 October 1958 in Vienna) is an Austrian mathematician. He is a retired professor of discrete mathematics (with a focus on combinatorics). From 2016 to 2020 he served as the Dean of the Faculty of Mathematics at the University of Vienna.

He received his doctoral degree sub auspiciis Praesidentis rei publicae at the University of Vienna in 1983 under Johann Cigler with the dissertation Lagrangeformel und inverse Relationen (Lagrange formula and inverse relations). Krattenthaler worked at various universities, including the University of California, San Diego, the Mathematical Sciences Research Institute in Berkeley, California, the University of Strasbourg, and the Claude Bernard University Lyon 1 before being appointed to a professorship at the University of Vienna in 2005. He took his retirement in 2024.

His area of specialization is the problems of combinatorial enumeration, such as those in algebra, algebraic geometry, number theory, computer science, or statistical physics.

Krattenthaler won in 1990 the Prize of the Austrian Mathematical Society and in 2007 the Wittgenstein Award of the Austrian Science Fund. He was elected in 2005 a corresponding member of the Austrian Academy of Sciences, in 2011 a full member of the Academia Europaea, and in 2012 a Fellow of the American Mathematical Society. In 2015 he received a Docteur honoris causa from the Université Sorbonne Paris Nord.

Krattenthaler is also a trained concert pianist. He studied piano at the (then) Hochschule für Musik und Darstellende Kunst Wien (today University of Music and Performing Arts Vienna) with Hans Graf. He completed his studies in 1986 with the concert diploma. Until 1991, he performed as soloist and chamber musician. Frequent chamber music partners were Bernhard Biberauer (violin), Alfred Hertel (oboe), Peter Siakala (violoncello), Anton Straka (violin), Herwig Tachezi (violoncello) and Thomas C. Wolf (violin). Krattenthaler terminated his concert activities in 1991 because of an irreversible chronic medical condition in both hands.
