= Ludwig Flamm =

Austrian physicist (1885–1964)

- Born: 29 January 1885
- Died: 4 December 1964 (aged 79)
- Occupation: Physicist
- Spouse: Elsa Boltzmann
- Children: Dieter Flamm
- Awards: 1961: Austrian Decoration for Science and Art 1963: Erwin Schrödinger Prize

Ludwig Flamm (29 January 1885 - 4 December 1964) was an Austrian physicist. A 1916 paper of his is considered the first paper that describes the concept of a wormhole.

== Biography ==
Ludwig Flamm, who came from a family of watchmakers, studied physics at the University of Vienna. In 1916, he was awarded the pro venia legendi at the Technische Universität Wien and in 1919 achieved a professorship. From 1922 to 1956, Flamm was a full professor and board member for physics at the Technische Universität Wien. He acted as dean from 1929 to 1931 and as rector from 1930 to 1931. Flamm was also a member of the Austrian Academy of Sciences. Flamm was married to Elsa, the youngest daughter of Ludwig Boltzmann. His son Dieter Flamm has been a university professor at the Institute for Theoretical Physics of the University of Vienna since 1973.

== Work ==
Ludwig Flamm worked in various areas of theoretical physics, including quantum mechanics and the general relativity theory, and on the Schwarzschild metric, "Flamm's paraboloid". Flamm was the first to describe solutions that lead to connections, now called wormholes, in the spacetime continuum, doing so in a paper in 1916.

== Awards (partial list) ==
- 1961: Austrian Decoration for Science and Art
- 1963: Erwin Schrödinger Prize
- The "Flammweg" in Simmering, Vienna, was named after him.
