= Otto Hittmair =

Austrian theoretical physicist (1924–2003)

- Born: 16 March 1924; Innsbruck, Austria
- Died: 5 September 2003 (aged 79); Nordkette mountains near Innsbruck
- Education: University of Innsbruck
- Known for: nuclear reactions
- Awards: Decoration of Honour for Services to the Republic of Austria (1980) Wilhelm Exner Medal (1980); Erwin Schrödinger Prize (1974); Joseph Johann Ritter von Prechtl Medal from the Vienna University of Technology Honorary Doctorate from the University of Budapest
- Scientific career
- Fields: physics

Otto Hittmair (16 March 1924 – 5 September 2003) was an Austrian theoretical physicist who made contributions to quantum mechanics, superconductivity and unified field theory. From 1987 to 1991 he was President of the Austrian Academy of Sciences.

== Life ==
Otto Hittmair was born in Innsbruck (Tyrol) on 16 March 1924. He graduated with distinction from the University of Innsbruck in 1942. He worked with Erwin Schrödinger at the Dublin Institute for Advanced Studies in the late 1940s and together with him, published work on a unified field theory. He worked abroad at the Institut Henri Poincaré, the University of Sydney, and the Massachusetts Institute of Technology (MIT) in Cambridge where he was a Fulbright scholar.

His specialty was nuclear reactions, especially stripping reactions, in which nucleons are exchanged between the scattering nuclei. In 1958–1960 he worked at the Atomic Institute of the Austrian Universities and in 1960 became Professor of Theoretical Physics and Director of the Institute of Theoretical Physics at the Technical University of Vienna.

He was Dean of the Faculty of Science from 1968 to 1969 and then Rector of the Technical University of Vienna from 1977 to 1979.

Otto Hittmair died on 5 September 2003 in a climbing accident in the Nordkette mountain range near Innsbruck. The main-belt asteroid 10782 Hittmair discovered in 1991 is named after him. Otto-Hittmair-Platz in Innsbruck is named in his honor.

== Works ==
- 1951 Studies in the generalized theory of gravitation (with Erwin Schrödinger), Dublin Institute for Advanced Studies
- 1957 Nuclear Stripping Reactions (with S. T. Buttler and Stuart Thomas), Horwitz Publications
- 1971 Wärmetheorie (with G. Adam), Vieweg+Teubner Verlag, ISBN 3528333111
- 1972 Lehrbuch der Quantentheorie, Verlag Karl Thiemig, January 1, 1972, ISBN 3446147950
- 1979 Supraleitung (mit H. Weber), K. Thiemig, ISBN 3521061132
- 1987 Schrödinger's unified field theory seen 40 years later'' (Editor C. W. Kilmister), Technische Universitӓt Wien
- 1997 Akademie der Wissenschaften : Entwicklung einer österreichischen Forschungsinstitution (with Herbert Hunger), Verlag der Österreichischen, Vienna, ISBN 3700126379
