= Wittgenstein Award =

Austrian science award

The Wittgenstein Award (German: Wittgenstein-Preis) is an Austrian science award supporting the notion that "scientists should be guaranteed the greatest possible freedom and flexibility in the performance of their research." The prize money of up to 1.9 million euro (2025) make it the most highly endowed science award of Austria, money that is tied to research activities within the five years following the award. The Wittgenstein-Preis is named after the philosopher Ludwig Wittgenstein and is conferred once per year by the Austrian Science Fund on behalf of the Austrian Ministry for Science.

== Objectives ==
The award provides aims to express recognition and to support "excellent scientists" up to 60 years of age who "have produced exceptional scientific work and who occupy a prominent place in the international scientific community". Awardees receive financial support up to 1.5 million euro to be spent over a period of five years. The award should enhance and extend the research possibilities of the awardees and their research groups.

== Nomination, requirements and selection ==
Nominations can be expressed by rectors as well as vice rectors for research of Austrian universities; the president of the Austrian Academy of Sciences; the president of the Institute of Science and Technology Austria (ISTA); and all previous Wittgenstein-Preis awardees. Self-nomination is not permitted, researchers of any discipline are entitled. There are no quotas regulating the distribution of awards between subject areas. Nominees must be 60 years old or younger; permanently employed at an Austrian research institution; internationally recognised in their respective academic field; and have their center of life in Austria for at least one year at the time of the nomination. The awardees are selected by an international jury of experts, the same jury also selects the recipients of the related Start-Preis.

== Recipients and affiliation ==
- 1996: Erwin Friedrich Wagner, Research Institute of Molecular Pathology (IMP)
- 1996: Ruth Wodak, Institut für Sprachwissenschaften, Universität Wien
- 1997: Marjori and Antonius Matzke, Institut für Molekularbiologie, Österreichische Akademie der Wissenschaften
- 1997: Erich Gornik, Institut für Festkörperelektronik, Technische Universität Wien
- 1998: Peter Zoller, Institut für Theoretische Physik, Leopold-Franzens-Universität, Innsbruck
- 1998: Walter Schachermayer, Institut für Informationssysteme, Technische Universität Wien
- 1998: Georg Gottlob, Institut für Informationssysteme, Technische Universität Wien
- 1999: Kim Nasmyth, Research Institute of Molecular Pathology (IMP)
- 2000: Peter Markowich, Institut für Mathematik, Universität Wien
- 2000: Andre Gingrich, Institut für Ethnologie, Kultur- und Sozialanthropologie, Universität Wien
- 2001: Heribert Hirt, Department für Pflanzenmolekularbiologie, Universität Wien
- 2001: Meinrad Busslinger, Research Institute of Molecular Pathology (IMP)
- 2002: Ferenc Krausz, Institut für Photonik, Technische Universität Wien
- 2003: Renée Schroeder, Institut für Mikrobiologie und Genetik, Universität Wien
- 2004: Walter Pohl, Forschungsstelle für Geschichte des Mittelalters, Österreichische Akademie der Wissenschaften
- 2005: Rudolf Grimm, Institut für Experimentalphysik, Universität Innsbruck
- 2005: Barry J. Dickson, Research Institute of Molecular Pathology (IMP)
- 2006: Hannes-Jörg Schmiedmayer, TU Wien
- 2007: Christian Krattenthaler, Fakultät für Mathematik, Universität Wien
- 2007: Rudolf Zechner, Institut für Molekulare Biowissenschaften, Universität Graz
- 2008: Markus Arndt, Fakultät für Physik, Universität Wien
- 2009: Gerhard Widmer, Institut für Computational Perception, Universität Linz
- 2009: Jürgen Knoblich, Institut für Molekulare Biotechnologie (IMBA)
- 2010: Wolfgang Lutz, International Institute for Applied Systems Analysis, Vienna Institute of Demography of the Austrian Academy of Sciences and Department of Socioeconomics at the Vienna University of Economics and Business
- 2011: Jan-Michael Peters, Research Institute of Molecular Pathology (IMP)
- 2011: Gerhard J.Herndl, Department für Meeresbiologie, Fakultät für Lebenswissenschaften, Universität Wien
- 2012: Niyazi Serdar Sariçiftçi, Institut für Physikalische Chemie und Institut für Organische Solarzellen, Universität Linz
- 2012: Thomas Henzinger, ISTA
- 2013: Ulrike Diebold, Institut für Angewandte Physik, TU Wien
- 2014: Josef Penninger, Institut für Molekulare Biotechnologie (IMBA)
- 2015: Claudia Rapp, Institut für Byzantinistik und Neogräzistik, University of Vienna
- 2016: Peter Jonas, Institute of Science and Technology Austria
- 2017: Hanns-Christoph Nägerl, University of Innsbruck
- 2018: Herbert Edelsbrunner, ISTA and Ursula Hemetek, Department of Folk Music Research and Ethnomusicology at the University of Music and Performing Arts Vienna
- 2019: Philipp Ther, Institute for Eastern European History and Michael Wagner, Department for Microbiology and Eco Systems Research, both University of Vienna
- 2020: Adrian Constantin, Department of Mathematics, University of Vienna
- 2021: Monika Henzinger, Faculty of Computer Science, University of Vienna
- 2022: Christa Schleper, Department of Functional and Evolutionary Biology, University of Vienna
- 2023: Hans J. Briegel, University of Innsbruck
- 2024: Jiří Friml, Institute of Science and Technology Austria
- 2025: Elly Tanaka, Institute of Molecular Biotechnology of the Austrian Academy of Sciences at the Vienna Biocenter
- 2026: Markus Aspelmeyer, University of Vienna
