= Daniel Gerlich =

German cell biologist

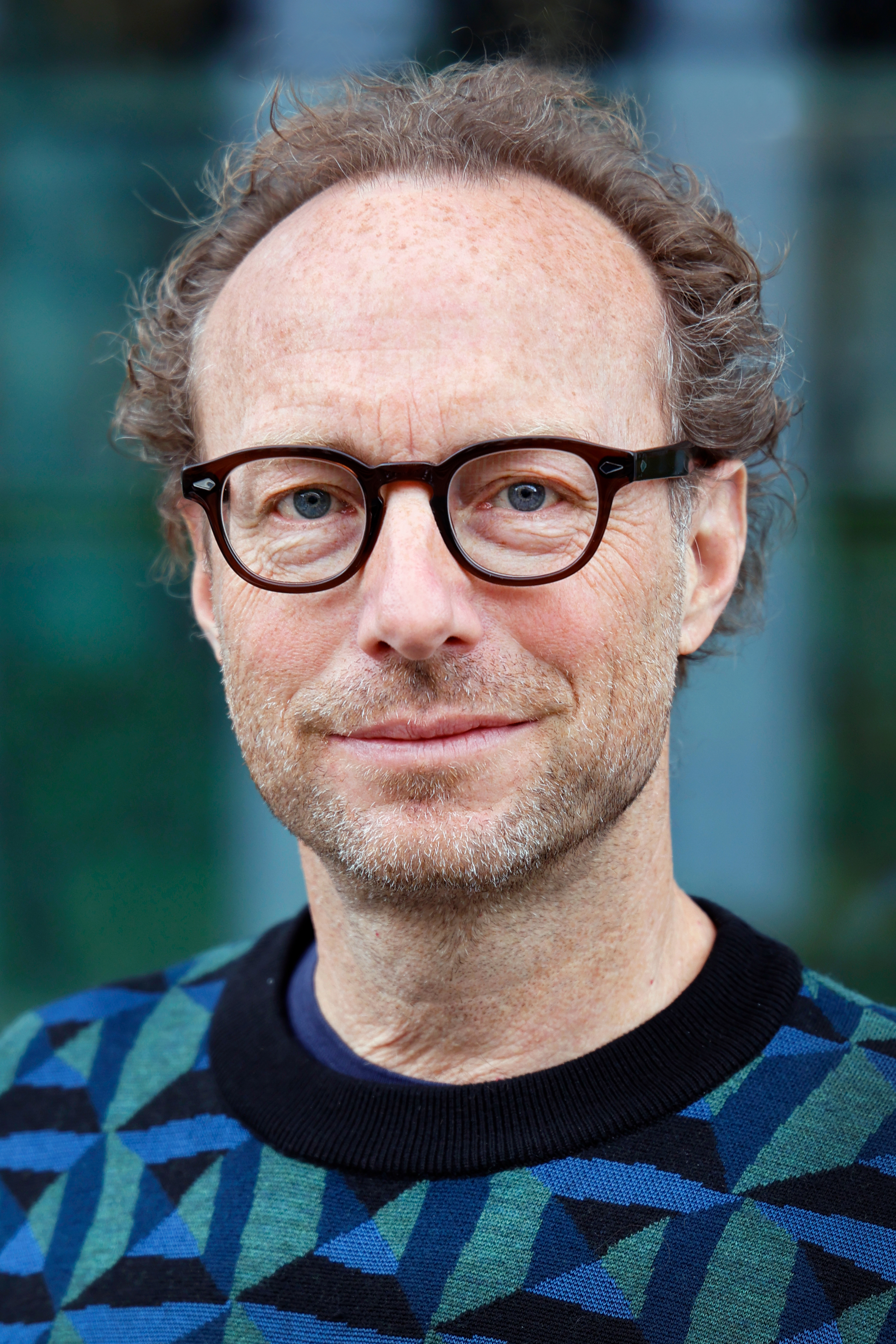
- Gerlich in 2026
- Born: Daniel Wolfram Gerlich; 1972 (age 53–54); Frankfurt am Main, Germany
- Education: University of Freiburg
- Known for: Chromosome organization, cell division, nuclear reassembly
- Awards: European Young Investigator Award (2005); EMBO Young Investigator (2009); ERC Starting Grant (2012); EMBO Membership (2017); ERC Advanced Grant (2021); Member of Academia Europaea (2022)
- Scientific career
- Fields: Cell biology, molecular biology, biophysics
- Workplaces: Institute of Molecular Biotechnology (IMBA), Austrian Academy of Sciences; ETH Zurich
- Thesis: (2002)
- Academic advisors: Jan Ellenberg (postdoctoral)

Daniel Wolfram Gerlich (born 1972 in Frankfurt am Main, Germany) is a German cell biologist. Since 2012 he has been a Senior Group Leader at the Institute of Molecular Biotechnology (IMBA) of the Austrian Academy of Sciences in Vienna.

== Education and career ==
Daniel Gerlich studied biology at the University of Freiburg in Germany. Following his graduation in 1998, he worked at German Cancer Research Center (DKFZ) and Ruprecht-Karls University Heidelberg, Germany, to obtain a PhD in 2002. That year, he started postdoctoral research in the laboratory of Jan Ellenberg at the European Molecular Biology Laboratory (EMBL) in Heidelberg. In 2005 he was appointed assistant professor at the Institute of Biochemistry at the Swiss Federal Institute of Technology in Zurich (ETHZ). He moved to the Institute of Molecular Biotechnology (IMBA), part of the Vienna BioCenter, in 2012 to take up a Senior Group Leader position. Since 2014 he is also an Editorial Advisory Board Member of the Journal of Cell Science and from 2015 to 2019 was a member of the “Gentechnikkommission” – an advisory board of the Ministry of Health of the Austrian Government.

== Research focus ==
Gerlich's work investigates the spatial organization and biomechanics of human chromosomes. By combining cell biology, biophysics, biochemistry, and computer science approaches, he aims to elucidate how chromosomes reorganize during cell cycle progression and how they rebuild a cell nucleus after cell division.

His research has been awarded multiple grants from the WWTF, the FWF and two ERC grants.

== Awards and honours ==
- 2025 Erwin Schrödinger Prize of the Austrian Academy of Sciences
- 2022 Elected to Academia Europaea
- 2021 Advanced Grant – European Research Council
- 2017 elected EMBO member
- 2012 Starting Grant – European Research Council
- 2009 elected EMBO Young Investigator
- 2005 European Young Investigator Award (EURYI Award) of the European Science Foundation

== Selected publications ==
- Teloni, F; Takacs, Z; Mitter, M; Langer, CCH; Prlesi, I; Steinacker, TL; Reuter, VP; Mylarshchikov, D; Gerlich, DW (4 December 2025). "Cohesin guides homology search during DNA repair using loops and sister chromatid linkages". Science. 390 (6777): eadw0566. doi:10.1126/science.adw0566. PMID 41343653.
- Schneider, MWG; Gibson, BA; Otsuka, S; Spicer, MFD; Petrovic, M; Blaukopf, C; Langer, CCH; Batty, P; Nagaraju, T; Doolittle, LK; Rosen, MK; Gerlich, DW (September 2022). "A mitotic chromatin phase transition prevents perforation by microtubules". Nature. 609 (7925): 183–190. doi:10.1038/s41586-022-05027-y. PMC 9433320. PMID 35922507.
- Cuylen-Haering, S; Petrovic, M; Hernandez-Armendariz, A; Schneider, MWG; Samwer, M; Blaukopf, C; Holt, LJ; Gerlich, DW (November 2020). "Chromosome clustering by Ki-67 excludes cytoplasm during nuclear assembly". Nature. 587 (7833): 285–290. doi:10.1038/s41586-020-2672-3. PMC 7666080. PMID 32879492.
- Mitter, M; Gasser, C; Takacs, Z; Langer, CCH; Tang, W; Jessberger, G; Beales, CT; Neuner, E; Ameres, SL; Peters, JM; Goloborodko, A; Micura, R; Gerlich, DW (October 2020). "Conformation of sister chromatids in the replicated human genome". Nature. 586 (7827): 139–144. doi:10.1038/s41586-020-2744-4. PMC 7116725. PMID 32968280.
- Cuylen, S; Blaukopf, C; Politi, AZ; Müller-Reichert, T; Neumann, B; Poser, I; Ellenberg, J; Hyman, AA; Gerlich, DW (14 July 2016). "Ki-67 acts as a biological surfactant to disperse mitotic chromosomes". Nature. 535 (7611): 308–312. doi:10.1038/nature18610. PMC 4947524. PMID 27362226.
