= Sasha Mendjan =

Austrian molecular biologist

- Born: June 1, 1978 (age 48); Zemun, SR Serbia, SFR Yugoslavia
- Education: LMU Munich; Heidelberg University; European Molecular Biology Laboratory
- Known for: Development of cardiac organoids (“cardioids”)
- Scientific career
- Fields: Molecular biology, stem cell biology, developmental biology
- Workplaces: Institute of Molecular Biotechnology (IMBA), Medical University of Vienna, University of Cambridge, EMBL, Heidelberg University
- Thesis: Chromosomal regulation of transcription
- Doctoral advisor: Asifa Akhtar

Sasha Mendjan (born 1 June 1978) is a molecular biologist, principal investigator at the Institute of Molecular Biotechnology (IMBA) of the Austrian Academy of Sciences and tenure-track assistant professor in synthetic tissue biology at the Medical University of Vienna. His research focuses on human cardiogenesis, stem cell biology, and disease modelling, particularly through the development of self-organizing cardiac organoids known as “cardioids”.

== Early life and education ==
Mendjan was born in 1978 in Zemun, then part of the Socialist Federal Republic of Yugoslavia. He studied biology and biochemistry at LMU Munich, completing diploma studies in biology and a diploma thesis in biochemistry.

He obtained his Ph.D. at the European Molecular Biology Laboratory (EMBL) and Heidelberg University, where he worked on the chromosomal regulation of transcription under the supervision of Asifa Akhtar.

Mendjan subsequently carried out postdoctoral research at the University of Cambridge, where he developed differentiation systems from human pluripotent stem cells into mesodermal lineages, enabling mechanistic studies of early developmental processes.

== Research and career ==
In 2015, Mendjan established his own research group at the Institute of Molecular Biotechnology (IMBA) in Vienna. His laboratory investigates the molecular and cellular mechanisms of human heart development, congenital heart disease, and regeneration.

A central contribution of his group is the development of “cardioids”, self-organising cardiac organoids derived from human pluripotent stem cells that recapitulate structural and functional features of the developing human heart including the self-organization into chamber-like structures, modelling this aspect of heart biology more closely than other cardiac organoid systems. These models have enabled the study of cardiac lineage specification, chamber formation, and disease mechanisms in vitro, addressing limitations in modelling human heart development.

The Mendjan laboratory has further expanded these systems into multi-chamber organoids that reproduce interactions between cardiac compartments and can be used to investigate congenital defects and drug responses.

== Awards and honors ==
- 2025: ERC Advanced Grant
- 2024: FWF Principal Investigator Grant

== Selected publications ==
- Hofbauer, P. et al. (2021). Cardioids reveal self-organizing principles of human cardiogenesis. Cell.
- Mendjan, S. et al. Publications in journals including Nature, Molecular Cell, Cell Stem Cell, and Stem Cell Reports.
