= Julius Brennecke =

German molecular biologist and geneticist

- Born: 1975 (age 50–51); Germany
- Education: Heidelberg University; European Molecular Biology Laboratory (EMBL)
- Known for: Small regulatory RNA pathways, piRNA/Piwi pathway, transposon silencing
- Awards: John Kendrew Award (2009); ERC Starting Grant (2010); Förderpreis City of Vienna (2012); EMBO Membership (2014); ERC Consolidator Grant (2016); ERC Advanced Grant (2024)
- Scientific career
- Fields: Molecular biology, genetics
- Workplaces: Institute of Molecular Biotechnology (IMBA), Austrian Academy of Sciences
- Thesis: (2005)
- Doctoral advisor: Steve Cohen
- Other academic advisors: Dirk Bohmann

Julius Brennecke (born 1975) is a German molecular biologist and geneticist. He is a Senior Group Leader at the Institute of Molecular Biotechnology. (IMBA) of the Austrian Academy of Sciences in Vienna.

== Education and career ==
Julius Brennecke studied biology at Heidelberg University. During his diploma thesis (supervised by Dirk Bohmann) he focused on the tandem affinity purification of protein complexes in Drosophila. In his PhD-thesis (with Steve Cohen), he specialized on microRNAs and their regulatory targets in Drosophila.

He obtained his PhD degree in 2005 (summa cum laude) from Heidelberg University jointly with the European Molecular Biology Laboratory (EMBL). After a short postdoctoral stay at EMBL, he carried out his postdoctoral training with Gregory Hannon at the Cold Spring Harbor Laboratory in New York (2006 to 2008). In 2009 he became group leader at the Institute of Molecular Biotechnology, part of the Vienna BioCenter, where he was appointed Senior Group Leader in 2014. Brennecke is a permanent EMBO member and editorial board member of the Journal of Cell Biology.

In 2020, Brennecke and his team significantly contributed to improving the RT-LAMP technique to support testing and detection of SARS-CoV-2 in Austria. In October 2020, the AGES (Austrian Agency for Health and Food Safety) explicitly recommended this technique for application in hospitals and diagnostic laboratories. This successful project was a collaboration between Brennecke and scientists from the Institute of Molecular Pathology in Vienna.

== Research ==
In his research Brennecke focuses on small regulatory RNA pathways (foremost the piRNA/Piwi pathway) and their role in suppressing transposable elements and inducing heterochromatin formation in animals. His research group focuses on the model organism Drosophila melanogaster and applies diverse approaches, such as genetics, genomics, biochemistry, imaging technologies, and computational biology.

== Selected publications ==
Hayashi, R., Schnabl, J., Handler, D., Mohn, F., Ameres, SL., Brennecke, J.: Genetic and mechanistic diversity of piRNA 3‘-end formation. Nature (2016) DOI: 10.1038/nature20162

Andersen, PR., Tirian, L., Vunjak, M., Brennecke, J.: A heterochromatin-dependent transcription machinery drives piRNA expression. Nature (2017) DOI: 10.1038/nature23482

Mohn, F., Handler, D., Brennecke, J.: Noncoding RNA. piRNA- guided slicing specifies transcripts for Zucchini-dependent, phased piRNA biogenesis. Science (2015) DOI: 10.1126/science.aaa1039

== Awards and honours ==
- 2024 Advanced Grant of the European Research Council (ERC)
- 2016 Consolidator Grant of the European Research Council (ERC)
- 2014 Elected as EMBO-member
- 2012 Förderpreis City of Vienna
- 2010 Starting Grant of the European Research Council (ERC)
- 2010 START Prize (FWF Austria)
- 2010 Premio Leonardo Prize of ten European Rotary Clubs (Vienna)
- 2009 John Kendrew Award (EMBL Heidelberg)
