= Erwin Schrödinger Prize =

The Erwin Schrödinger Prize (German: Erwin Schrödinger-Preis) is an annual award presented by the Austrian Academy of Sciences for lifetime achievement by Austrians in the fields of mathematics and natural sciences. The prize was established in 1958, and was first awarded to its namesake, Erwin Schrödinger.

== Prize criteria and endowment ==
The prize is awarded at the discretion of the Austrian Academy of Sciences to scholars resident in Austria for excellence and achievements in the mathematical and scientific disciplines in the broadest sense. The prize is not awarded to full members of the Academy.

The award ceremony is held annually in October. The prize includes an annual stipend currently of € 15 000, paid monthly.

== Prize winners ==
- 1956 Erwin Schrödinger
- 1958 Felix Machatschki
- 1960 Erich Schmid
- 1962 Marietta Blau
- 1963 Ludwig Flamm and Karl Przibram
- 1964 Otto Kratky
- 1965 Fritz Wessely
- 1966 Georg Stetter
- 1967 Berta Karlik and Gustav Ortner
- 1968 Hans Nowotny
- 1969 Walter Thirring
- 1970 Erika Cremer
- 1971 Richard Biebl
- 1972 Fritz Regler and Paul Urban
- 1973 Hans Tuppy
- 1974 Otto Hittmair and Peter Weinzierl
- 1975 Richard Kiefer and Erwin Plöckinger
- 1976 Herbert W. König and Ferdinand Steinhauser
- 1977 Viktor Gutmann and Helmut Rauch
- 1978 Edmund Hlawka and Günther Porod
- 1979 Heinz Parkus
- 1980 Peter Klaudy and Hans List
- 1981 Kurt Komarek
- 1982 Othmar Preining
- 1983 Josef Schurz and Peter Schuster
- 1984 Leopold Schmetterer and Josef Zemann
- 1985 Adolf Neckel and Karl Schlögl
- 1986 Walter Majerotto and Horst Wahl
- 1987 Edwin Franz Hengge and Franz Seitelberger
- 1988 Wolfgang Kummer and Fritz Paschke
- 1989 Johannes Pötzl
- 1990 Manfred W. Breiter and Karl Kordesch
- 1991 Siegfried J. Bauer and Willibald Riedler
- 1992 Josef F. K. Huber and Karlheinz Seeger
- 1993 Benno F. Lux and Oskar F. Olaj
- 1994 Tilmann Märk and Heide Narnhofer
- 1995 Heinz Gamsjäger and Jürgen Hafner
- 1996 Alfred Kluwick
- 1997 Werner Lindinger and Thomas Schönfeld
- 1998 Peter Zoller
- 1999 Johann Mulzer
- 2000 Erich Gornik and Hans Troger
- 2001 Bernhard Kräutler and Siegfried Selberherr
- 2002 Ekkehart Tillmanns
- 2003 Erwin S. Hochmair and Hildegunde Piza
- 2004 Anton Stütz and Jakob Yngvason
- 2005 Franz Dieter Fischer and Rainer Kotz
- 2006 Rainer Blatt
- 2007 Georg Brasseur and Thomas Jenuwein
- 2008 Georg Wick
- 2009 Bernd Mayer
- 2010 Walter Kutschera
- 2011 Gerhard A. Holzapfel
- 2012 Jürgen Knoblich
- 2013 Nick Barton
- 2014 Denise P. Barlow
- 2015 Michael Wagner und Jiří Friml
- 2016 Ortrun Mittelsten Scheid and Jürgen Sandkühler
- 2017 Francesca Ferlaino
- 2018 Elly Tanaka and Peter Jonas
- 2019 Karlheinz Gröchenig and Helmut Ritsch
- 2020 László Erdős and Markus Arndt
- 2021 Christoph Bock
- 2022 Robert Seiringer
- 2023 Leonid Sazanov
- 2024 Hans Jürgen Briegel and Daniel Gerlich
- 2025 Anton Rebhan

== See also ==
- Schrödinger Medal
