= Blastoid (embryoid) =

Stem cell-based embryo model

A blastoid is an embryoid, a stem cell-based embryo model which, morphologically and transcriptionally resembles the early, pre-implantation, mammalian conceptus, called the blastocyst. The first blastoids were created by the Nicolas Rivron laboratory by combining mouse embryonic stem cells and mouse trophoblast stem cells. Upon in vitro development, blastoids generate analogs of the primitive endoderm cells, thus comprising analogs of the three founding cell types of the conceptus (epiblast, trophoblast and primitive endoderm), and recapitulate aspects of implantation on being introduced into the uterus of a compatible female. Mouse blastoids have not shown the capacity to support the development of a foetus and are thus generally not considered as an embryo but rather as a model. As compared to other stem cell-based embryo models (e.g., Gastruloids), blastoids model the preimplantation stage and the integrated development of the conceptus including the embryo proper and the two extraembryonic tissues (trophectoderm and primitive endoderm). The blastoid is a model system for the study of mammalian development and disease. It might be useful for the identification of therapeutic targets and preclinical modelling.
