= Déborah Bourc'his =

French researcher in Epigenetics

Déborah Bourc'his is a French researcher in Epigenetics. She is currently a team leader at the Curie Institute (Paris). Her research has been awarded the prize Liliane Bettencourt Prize for Life Sciences.

== Education and academic appointments ==
In 1996., she joins the laboratory of Evani Viegas-Pequignot to do a PhD in Genetics in at the Necker–Enfants Malades Hospital. There, she identifies methylation mutations on DNMT3B.

In 2000, she moves to the laboratory of Timothy Bestor at the Columbia University to start her postdoctoral studies.

In 2009, after being recruited at the French biomedical research institute Inserm, she is invited by Edith Heard to start her own research team at the Curie Institute (Paris).

== Research ==
During her postdoctoral studies, she shows that germline cells require a specific stimulation to acquire DNA methylation, via the cofactor 3 DNMT3L.

Déborah Bourc'his runs a research team studying epigenetic decisions and reproduction in the department 'Genetics and Developmental biology' of the Curie Institute. Her research focuses on understanding the regulation of epigenetic information within the peri-conception window, from Gametogenesis to early embryonic development. She has published several key publications in the field. Her work has been awarded several prestigious prizes.

== Awards ==
- 2017: Lilianne Bettencourt Schueller prize for research in life sciences
- 2010: Prize from Schlumberger Foundation for Education and Research
