= Sir Hans Krebs Medal =

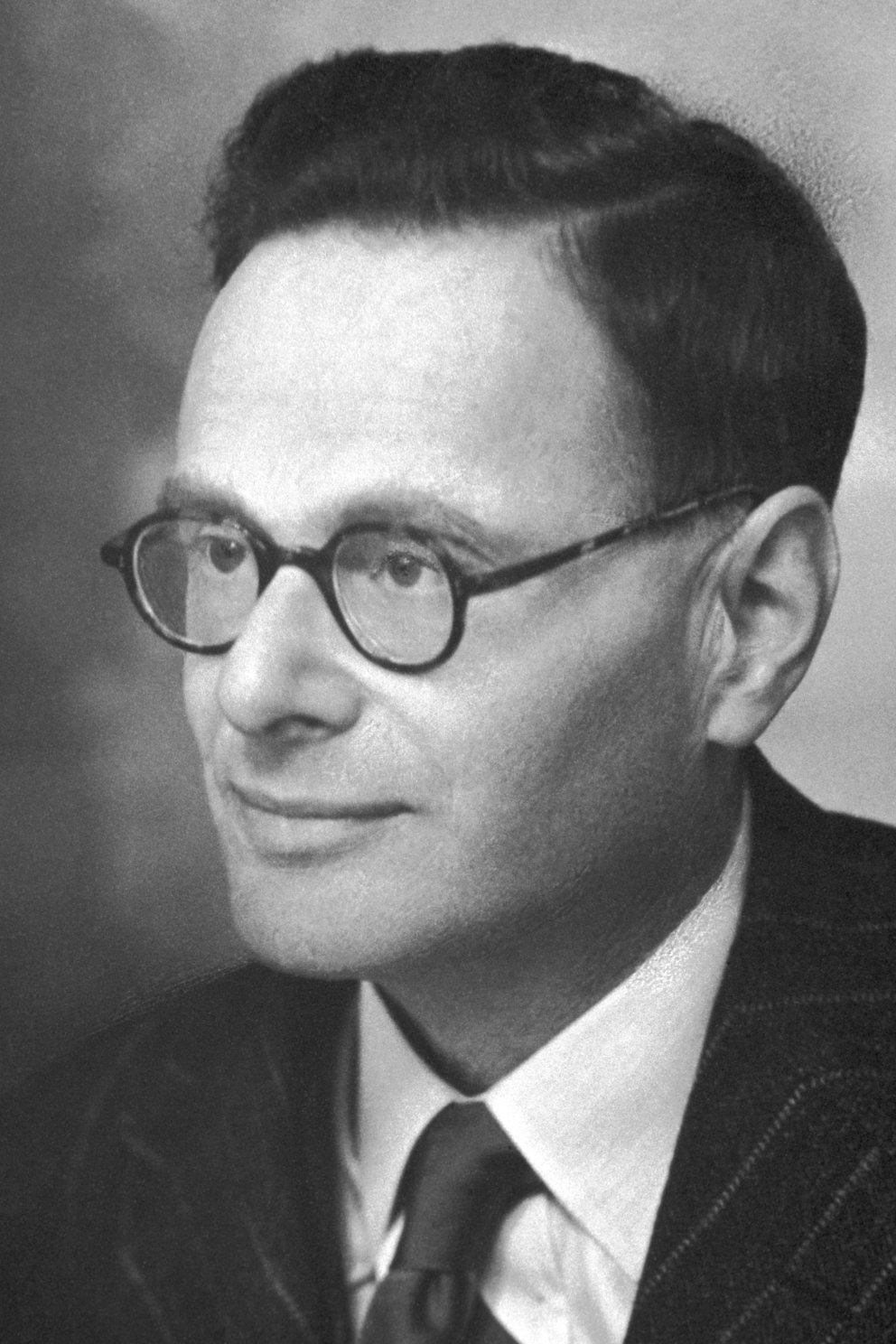
Sir Hans Adolf Krebs

The Sir Hans Krebs Lecture and Medal is awarded annually by the Federation of European Biochemical Societies (FEBS) for outstanding achievements in Biochemistry and Molecular Biology or related sciences.

It was endowed by the Lord Rank Centre for Research and named after the German-born British biochemist Sir Hans Adolf Krebs, well known for identifying the urea and citric acid cycles. The awardee receives a silver medal and presents one of the plenary lectures at the FEBS Congress.

== List of recipients ==
Source: (1968–2002)

- 2026 Peter J. Ratcliffe
- 2025 Annette G. Beck-Sickinger
- 2024 Alberto Mantovani
- 2023 Karen Vousden
- 2022 Cecília Rodrigues (University of Lisbon, Portugal)
- 2019 Mathias Uhlen
- 2018 Albert J.R. Heck
- 2017 Carol V. Robinson
- 2016 Kári Stefánsson
- 2015 Jürgen Knoblich
- 2014 Michael N. Hall
- 2013 Richard J. Roberts
- 2012 V. Ramakrishnan
- 2011 Elena Conti
- 2010 Harald Stenmark
- 2009 Václav Hořejší
- 2008 Tim Hunt
- 2007 Tom Rapoport
- 2006 Aaron Ciechanover
- 2005 Thomas Jenuwein
- 2004 Ryszard Gryglewski
- 2003 No award?
- 2002 Jacques Pouysségur
- 2001 Sir Philip Cohen
- 2000 Thomas Steitz
- 1999 Stanley B. Prusiner
- 1998 Bengt I. Samuelsson
- 1997 David Baltimore
- 1996 Josef Stefaan Schell
- 1995 Kim Nasmyth
- 1994 Jean-Pierre Changeux
- 1993 Christiane Nüsslein-Volhard
- 1992 Robert Huber
- 1991 No Award
- 1990 Pierre Chambon
- 1989 Helmut Beinert
- 1988 No award
- 1987 Tom Blundell
- 1986 Gottfried Schatz
- 1985 Robert Joseph Paton Williams
- 1984 Richard Henderson
- 1983 Arthur Kornberg
- 1982 François Jacob
- 1981 Cesar Milstein
- 1980 Sydney Brenner (No lecture due to illness)
- 1979 Pierre Desnuelle
- 1978 Peter D. Mitchell
- 1977 Francis Crick
- 1976 No award
- 1975 Heinz-Gunter Wittmann
- 1974 Charles Weissmann
- 1973 Arthur B. Pardee
- 1972 Ephraim Katchalski
- 1971 David Chilton Phillips
- 1970 No Award
- 1969 Alexander Spirin
- 1968 Max Perutz (inaugural award)

== See also ==
- List of biochemistry awards
