= Max Perutz Labs =

Coordinates: 48.1883°N 16.4010°E

Max Perutz Labs Vienna
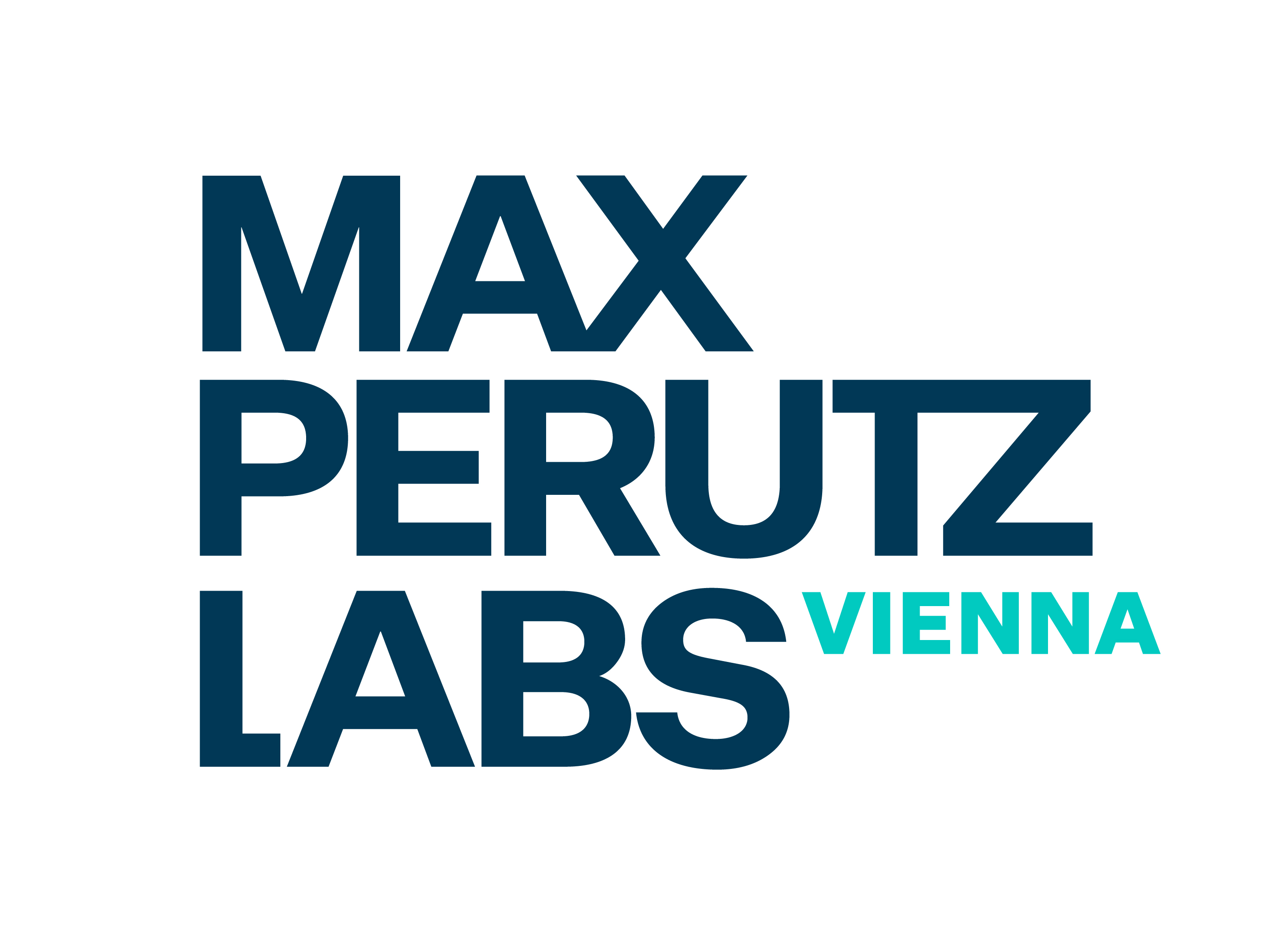
- Parent institution: University of Vienna; Medical University of Vienna
- Established: 2005
- Scientific director: Alwin Köhler
- Location: Dr. Bohr-Gasse 9; 1030 Vienna; Austria
- Website: maxperutzlabs.ac.at

The Max Perutz Labs Vienna are a molecular biology research centre operated jointly by the University of Vienna and the Medical University of Vienna located at the Vienna Biocenter. The institute is named after the Viennese-born biochemist and Nobel laureate Max Ferdinand Perutz. On average, the institute hosts 50 independent research groups. Max Perutz Labs scientists participate in the undergraduate curricula for students of the University of Vienna and the Medical University of Vienna.

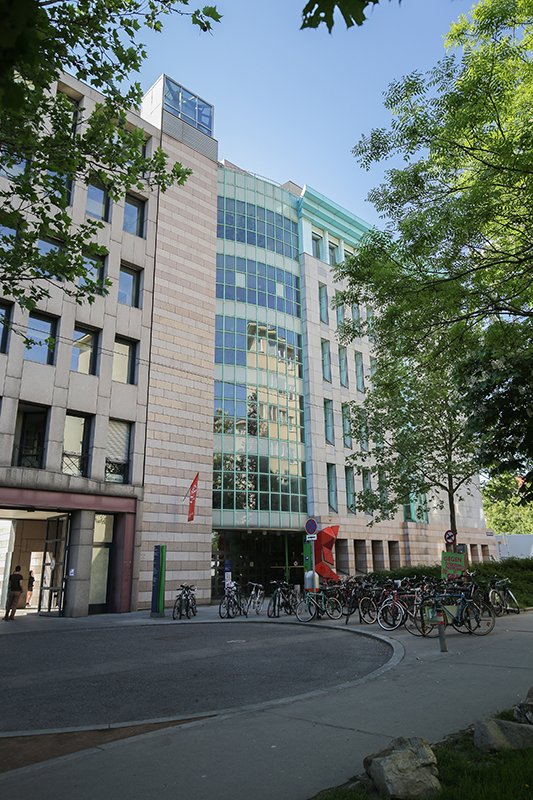
The main building

== History ==
The Max Perutz Labs Vienna were founded in 2005, named after the Viennese-born biochemist Max Ferdinand Perutz, who emigrated to England after graduating in Chemistry from the University of Vienna. In Cambridge, he helped to set up the Laboratory of Molecular Biology. He was awarded the Nobel prize in Chemistry together with John Kendrew in 1962, for their studies of the structures of globular proteins.

== Awards and honours ==
Max Perutz Labs former group leader Emmanuelle Charpentier received the 2015 Breakthrough Prize in Life Sciences and the 2020 Nobel Prize in Chemistry for her work on the CRISPR/Cas9 system, done partly in Vienna.

As of June 2019, scientists of the Max Perutz Labs have been awarded 14 ERC grants.
