= Vienna Biocenter =

Group of life science research institutes in Vienna, Austria

Coordinates: 48°11′20.7″N 16°24′9.2″E

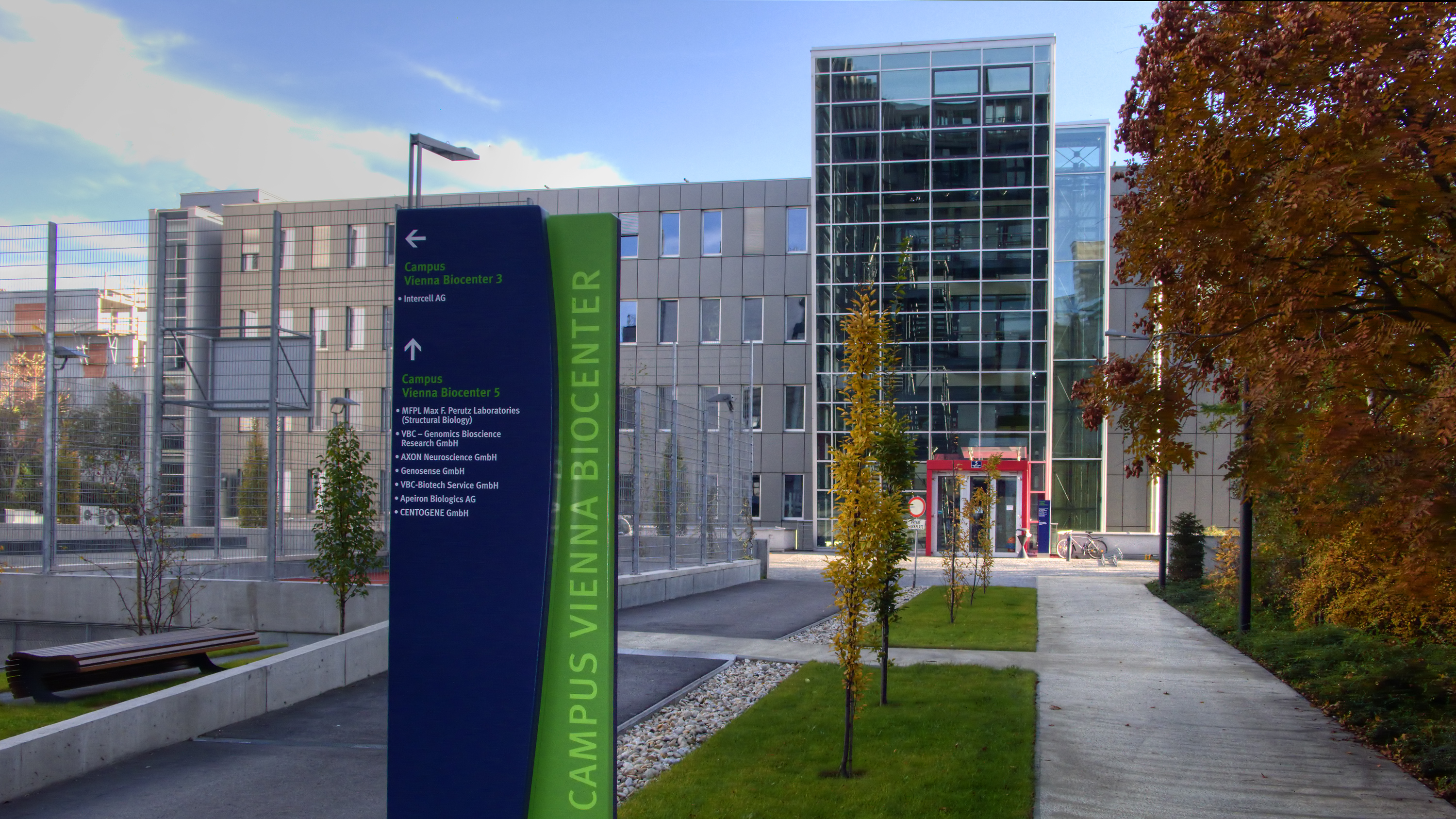
Vienna Biocenter Campus 5

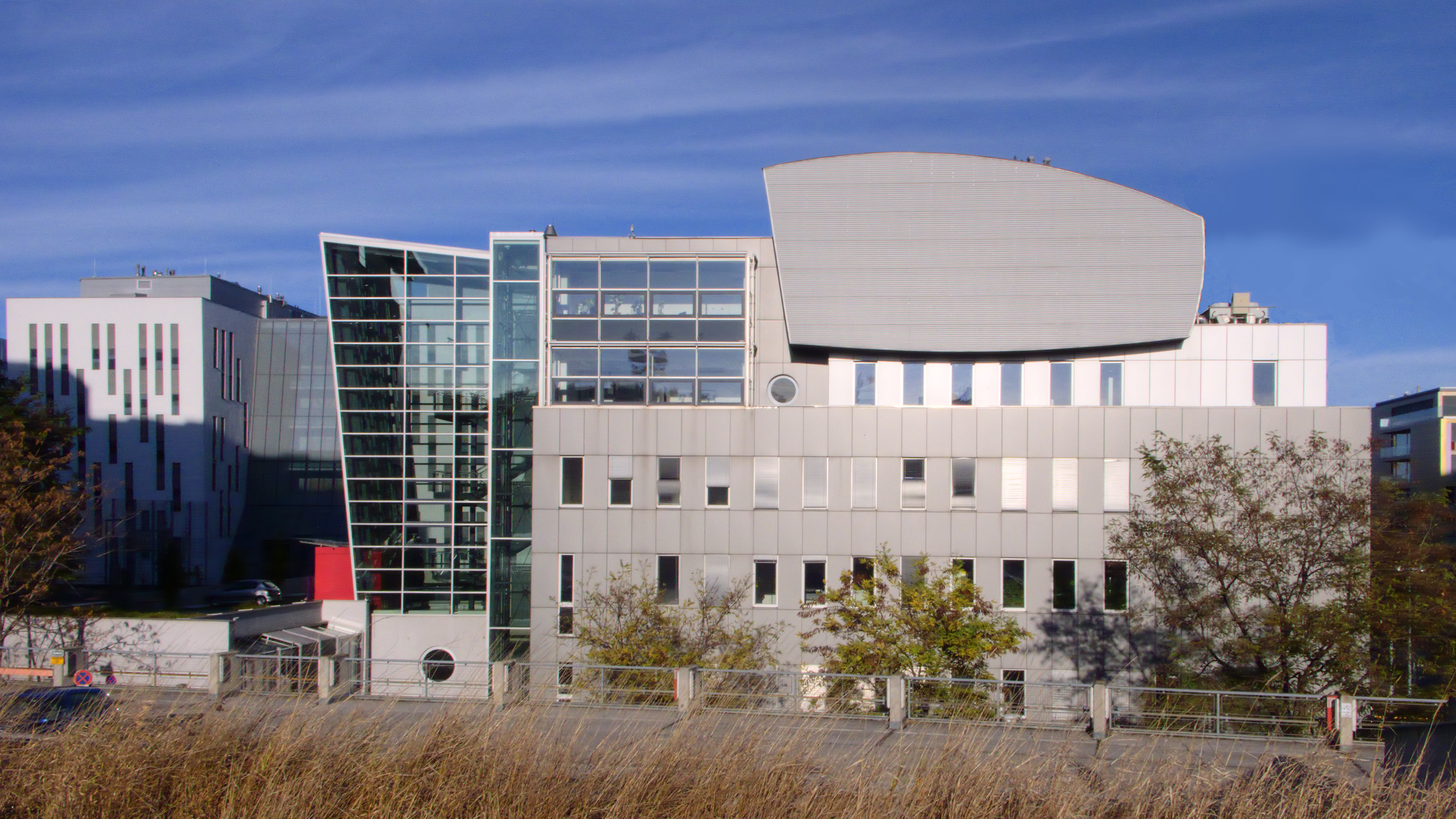
Vienna Biocenter Campus 5

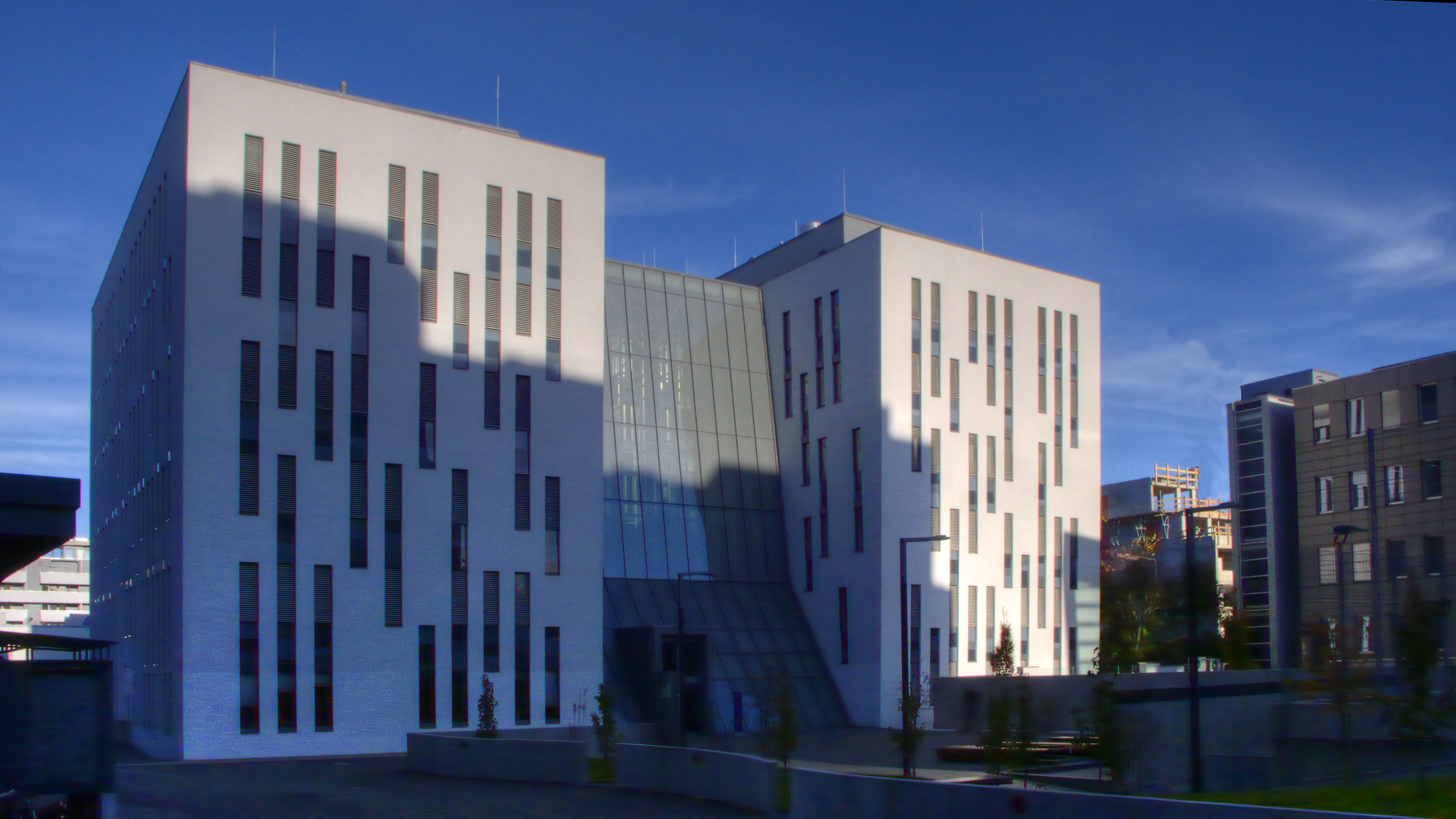
Vienna Biocenter Campus 3

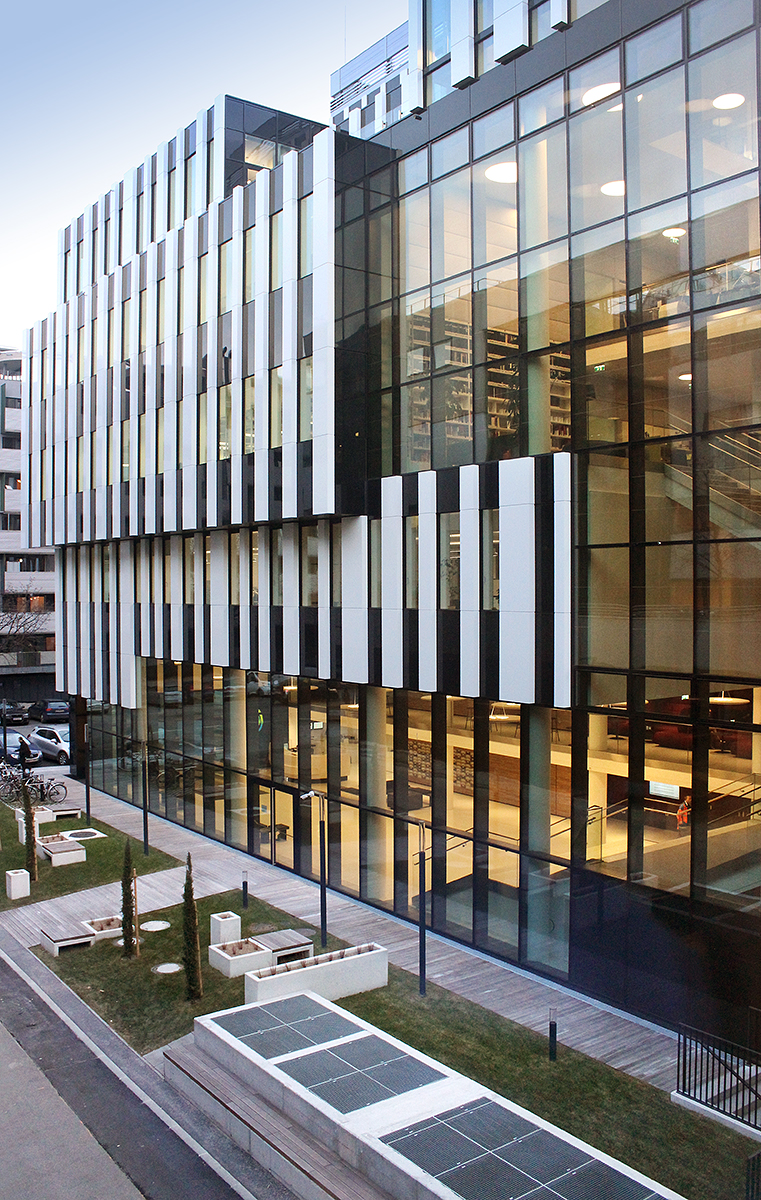
Research Institute of Molecular Pathology (IMP), outside view.

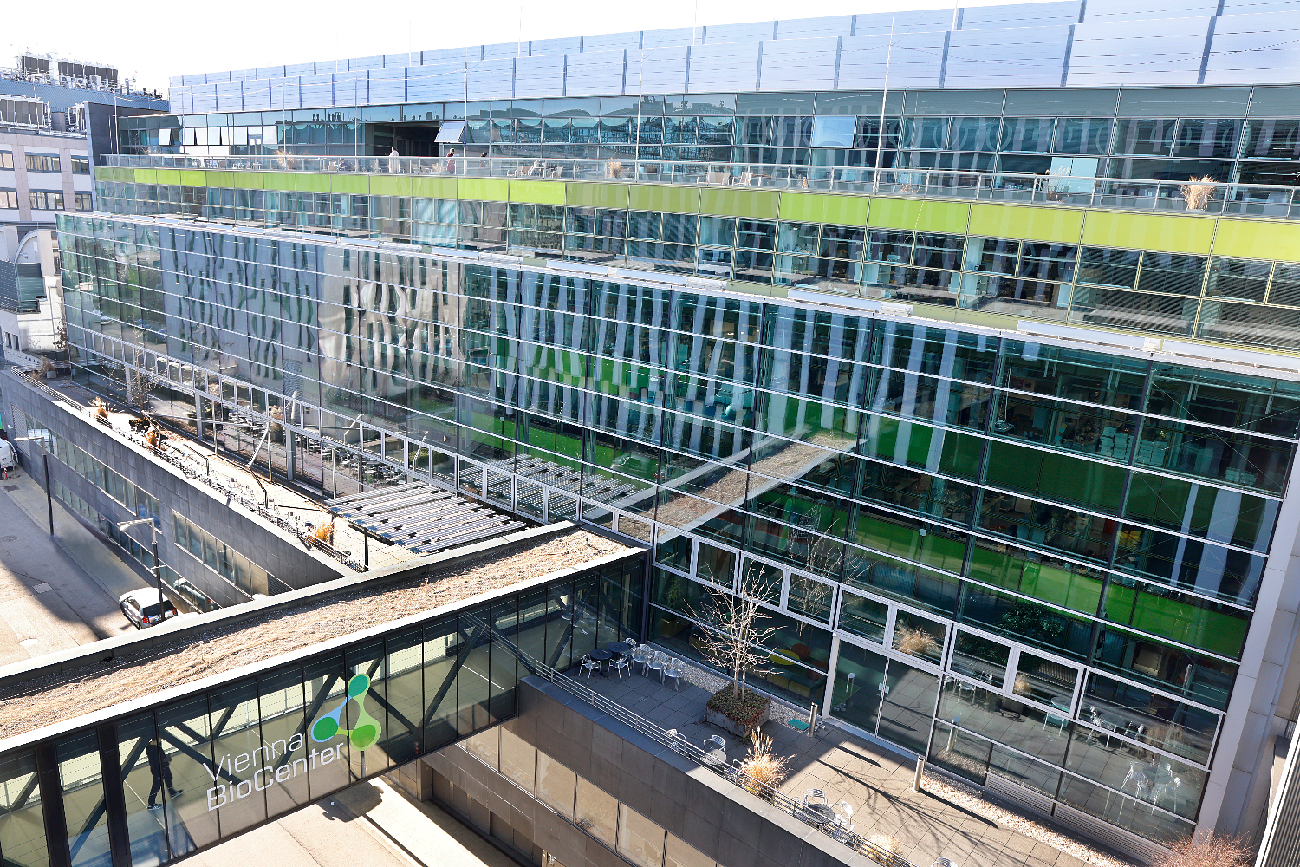
Outside view of IMBA and GMI, two institutes of the Austrian Academy of Sciences at the Vienna BioCenter.

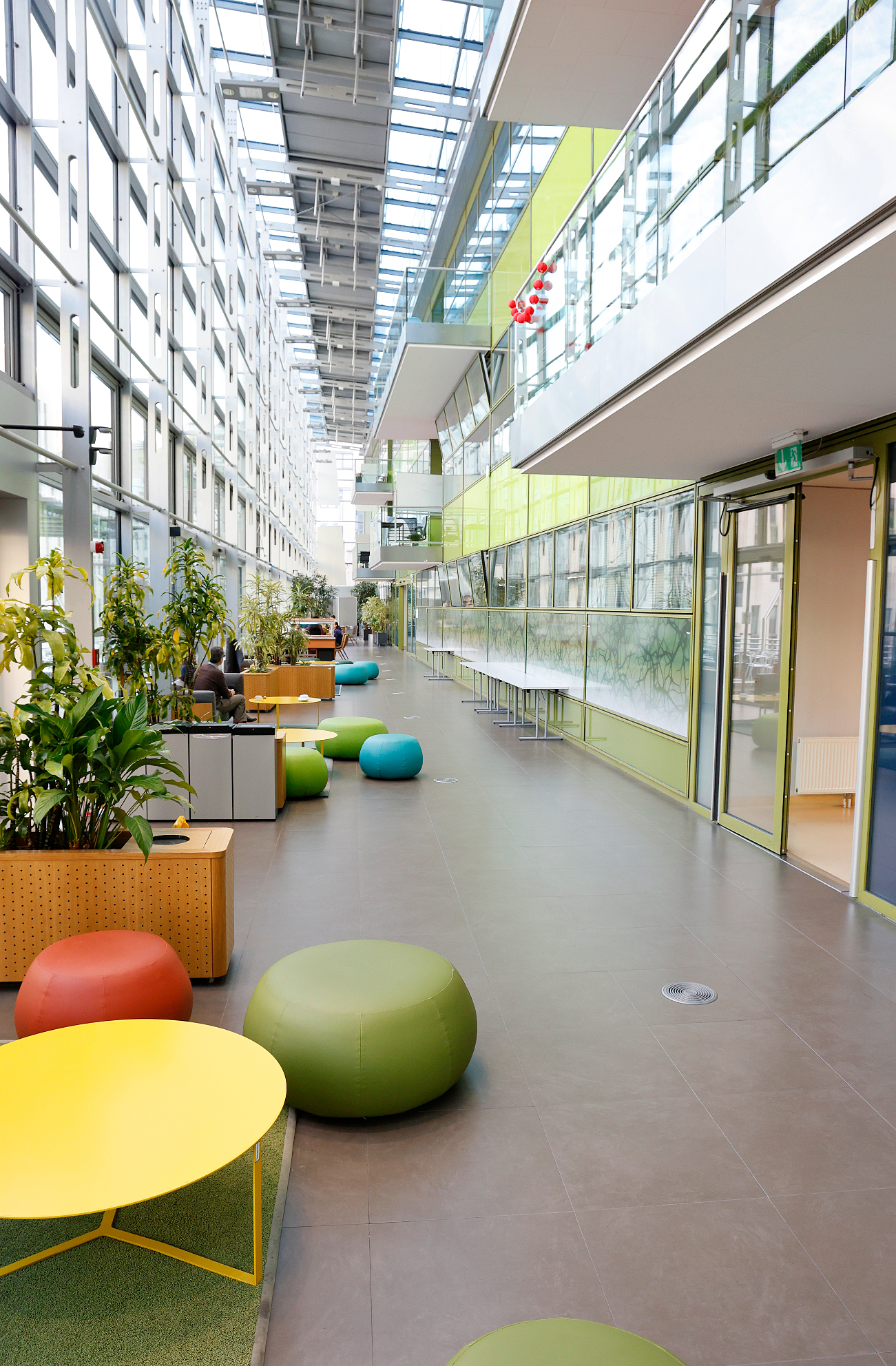
Atrium of the ÖAW building at the Vienna BioCenter in February 2026.

The Vienna BioCenter is a cluster of life science research institutes and biotechnology companies located in the 3rd municipal District of Vienna, Austria. It grew around the Research Institute of Molecular Pathology (IMP), which opened in 1988. The entities at the Vienna BioCenter employ more than 2,000 people, including 600 students.

== Structure ==
As of 2020, the Vienna BioCenter is an association of six research entities, 38 biotech companies, 1 outreach organisation, 4 service companies and 2 business incubators.

There are four basic research institutes on campus: the Research Institute of Molecular Pathology (IMP), the Max Perutz Labs of the University of Vienna and Medical University of Vienna, the Institute of Molecular Biotechnology (IMBA) of the Austrian Academy of Sciences (ÖAW), and the Gregor Mendel Institute of Molecular Plant Biology (GMI), also of the ÖAW. These institutes maintain a joint international PhD programme. The University Biology Building (UBB) houses parts of the Faculty of Life Sciences and the Centre for Microbiology and Environmental Systems Science (CeMESS), both part of the University of Vienna.

In September 2024, the Boehringer Ingelheim Stiftung and Austrian Academy of Sciences (ÖAW) incepted the Aithyra Institute, a research organisation for Artificial intelligence and biomedicine.

The "Vienna BioCenter Core Facilities" (VBCF) offer central services, largely scientific, but also including a child care centre.

== Vienna BioCenter Scientific Training ==
The Vienna BioCenter has developed into one of Austria’s principal centers for graduate training in molecular biosciences and related disciplines. A number of training initiatives are coordinated centrally as "Vienna BioCenter Scientific Training", including a PhD program, summer school, postdoctoral training, a leadership program, and alumni relations.

The Vienna BioCenter PhD Program is one of the doctoral schools of the University of Vienna and Medical University of Vienna in collaboration with the Gregor Mendel Institute (GMI) and Institute of Molecular Biotechnology (IMBA) of the Austrian Academy of Science, Research Institute of Molecular Pathology (IMP) and the Max Perutz Labs The program recruits internationally and conducts instruction in English.

The Vienna BioCenter Summer School, founded in 2010, hosts undergraduate students from multiple countries for laboratory research internships and advanced coursework.

Additional initiatives include the VIP³ postdoctoral program, the Vienna BioCenter Leadership Program, an alumni organization, and career-development activities.

== Awards ==
Kim Nasmyth, emeritus director of the Research Institute of Molecular Pathology (IMP), currently at the University of Oxford, received the 2018 Breakthrough Prize in Life Sciences for his work on chromosome segregation.

After receiving the 2015 Breakthrough Prize in Life Sciences, the 2020 Nobel Prize for Chemistry was awarded to Emmanuelle Charpentier and Jennifer Doudna for their groundbreaking discoveries on the CRISPR/Cas9 system. Emmanuelle Charpentier was a principal investigator at the Max Perutz Labs at the University of Vienna from 2002 to 2009, where she laid the groundwork for developing the technology.

As of May 2021, scientists of the Vienna BioCenter institutes have been awarded 57 ERC grants and eleven Wittgenstein Awards.
