= Helium compounds =

Class of extreme chemical compounds

Helium is the smallest and the lightest noble gas and one of the most unreactive elements, so it was commonly assumed that helium compounds could not exist at all, or at least not under normal conditions. Helium's first ionization energy of 24.57 eV is the highest of any element. Helium has a complete shell of electrons, and in this form the atom does not readily accept any extra electrons nor join with anything to make covalent compounds. The electron affinity is 0.080 eV, which is very close to zero. The helium atom is small, with the radius of the outer electron shell at 0.29 Å. Helium is a very hard atom with a Pearson hardness of 12.3 eV. It has the lowest polarizability of any kind of atom; however, very weak van der Waals forces exist between helium and other atoms. This force may exceed repulsive forces, so at extremely low temperatures helium may form van der Waals molecules. Helium has the lowest boiling point (4.2 K) of any known substance.

Repulsive forces between helium and other atoms may be overcome by high pressures. Helium has been shown to form a crystalline compound with sodium under pressure. Suitable pressures to force helium into solid combinations could be found inside planets. Clathrates are also possible with helium under pressure in ice, and other small molecules such as nitrogen.

Other ways to make helium reactive are: to convert it into an ion, or to excite an electron to a higher level, allowing it to form excimers. Ionized helium (He^{+}), also known as He II, is a very high energy material able to extract an electron from any other atom. He^{+} has an electron configuration like hydrogen, so as well as being ionic, it can form covalent bonds. Excimers do not last for long, as the molecule containing the higher energy level helium atom can rapidly decay back to a repulsive ground state, where the two atoms making up the bond repel. However, in some locations such as helium white dwarfs, conditions may be suitable to rapidly form excited helium atoms. The excited helium atom has a 1s electron promoted to 2s. This requires 1,900 kilojoules (450 kcal) per gram of helium, which can be supplied by electron impact, or electric discharge. The 2s excited electron state resembles that of the lithium atom.

== Known solid phases ==
Most solid combinations of helium with other substances require high pressure. Helium does not bond with the other atoms, but the substances can have a well defined crystal structure.

=== Disodium helide ===
Disodium helide (Na_{2}He) is a compound of helium and sodium that is stable at high pressures above 113 gigapascals (1,130,000 bar). Disodium helide was first predicted using USPEX code and was first synthesised in 2016. It was predicted to be thermodynamically stable over 160 GPa and dynamically stable over 100 GPa. Na_{2}He has a cubic crystal structure, resembling fluorite. At 300 GPa the edge of a unit cell of the crystal has a = 3.95 Å. Each unit cell contains four helium atoms on the centre of the cube faces and corners, and eight sodium atoms at coordinates a quarter cell in from each face. Double electrons (2e^{−}) are positioned on each edge and the centre of the unit cell. Each pair of electrons is spin paired. The presence of these isolated electrons makes this an electride. The helium atoms do not participate in any bonding. However the electron pairs can be considered as an eight-centre two-electron bond. Disodium helide is predicted to be an insulator and transparent.

=== Silicates ===
Helium was first observed to enter into a silicate in 2007. The mineral melanophlogite is a natural silica clathrate (clathrasil) that normally would contain carbon dioxide, methane or nitrogen. When compressed with helium, a new clathrate forms. This has a much higher bulk modulus, and resists amorphization. Helium was taken up around 17 GPa, enlarging the unit cell, and given off again when pressure dropped to 11 GPa.

Cristobalite He II (SiO_{2}He) is stable between 1.7 and 6.4 GPa. It has a rhombohedral space group R-3c with unit cell dimensions a = 9.080 Å, α = 31.809° and V = 184.77 Å^{3} at 4 GPa.

Cristobalite He I (SiO_{2}He) can be formed under higher helium pressures over 6.4 GPa. It has a monoclinic space group P2_{1}/C with unit cell dimensions a = 8.062 Å, b = 4.797 Å, c = 9.491 Å, β = 120.43° and V = 316.47 Å^{3} at 10 GPa.

Helium penetrates into fused silica at high pressure, reducing its compressibility.

Chibaite, another natural silica clathrate has its structure penetrated by helium under pressures higher than 2.5 GPa. The presence of guest hydrocarbons does not prevent this happening. Neon requires a higher pressure, 4.5 GPa to penetrate, and unlike helium shows hysteresis. Linde-type A zeolites are also rendered less compressible when penetrated by helium between 2 and 7 GPa.

=== Arsenolite helium inclusion compound ===
Arsenolite helium inclusion compound As_{4}O_{6}·2He is stable from pressures over 3 GPa and up to at least 30 GPa. Arsenolite is one of the softest and most compressible minerals. Helium prevents amorphization that would otherwise occur in arsenolite under pressure. The solid containing helium is stronger and harder, with a higher sound velocity than plain arsenolite. The helium that is included into the crystal causes a more uniform stress on the As_{4}O_{6} molecules. No actual bond is formed from arsenic to helium despite the lone pairs of electrons available. The diffusion of helium into arsenolite is a slow process taking days at a pressure around 3 GPa. However, if the pressure on the crystal is too high (13 GPa) helium penetration does not take place, as the gaps between arsenolite molecules become too small. Neon does not diffuse into arsenolite.

=== Perovskites ===
Helium can be inserted into the A sites of negative thermal expansion perovskites that otherwise have defects at the A site. At room temperature and 350 MPa helium is included into CaZrF_{6} to expand its unit cell yielding HeCaZrF_{6}. About half of the A sites are filled by helium atoms. This substance loses helium over several minutes on depressurisation at ambient temperature, but below 130 K it retains helium when depressurised. At 1 GPa all the A sites are filled by helium, yielding He_{2}CaZrF_{6}.

=== Formates ===
Under pressure helium penetrates dimethylammonium iron formate (CH_{3})_{2}NH_{2}Fe(HCOO)_{3}. It affects this by causing a change to a monoclinic ordered state at a lower pressure (around 4 GPa) than if helium were absent.

=== Small molecule ===
He(N_{2})_{11} is a van der Waals compound with hexagonal crystals. At 10 GPa the unit cell of 22 nitrogen atoms has a unit cell volume of 558 Å^{3}, and about 512 Å^{3} at 15 GPa. These sizes are around 10 Å^{3} smaller than the equivalent amount of solid δ-N_{2} nitrogen at these pressures. The substance is made by compressing nitrogen and helium in a diamond anvil cell.

NeHe_{2} has a crystal structure of hexagonal MgZn_{2} type at 13.7 GPa. The unit cell has dimensions a = 4.066 Å, c = 6.616 Å; and at 21.8 GPa, a = 3.885 Å, c = 6.328 Å. There are four atoms in each unit cell. It melts at 12.8 GPa and 296 K, stable to over 90 GPa.

=== Clathrates ===
Helium clathrates only form under pressure. With ice II at pressures between 280 and 480 MPa a solid helium hydrate with He:H_{2}O ratio of 1:6 exists. Another clathrate with a water to helium ratio of 2.833 has been made in the SII clathrate structure. It has two different cages in the ice, the small one can contain one helium atom, and the large can contain four atoms. It was produced from neon clathrate that lost its neon, and then replaced by helium at 141 K and 150 MPa Other helium hydrates with the ice-I_{h}, ice-I_{c} 1:1, and ice-I_{c} 2:1 He to H_{2}O ratio have been predicted. These could exist in planets like Neptune or Uranus. Helium clathrate hydrates should be similar to hydrogen clathrate due to the similar size of the hydrogen molecule.

Helium may enter into crystals of other molecular solids under pressure to alter their structure and properties; for example, with chlorpropamide over 0.3 GPa in helium changes to a monoclinic structure, and yet another structural form at 1.0 GPa.

=== Fullerites ===
Helium can form intercalation compounds with the fullerites, including buckminsterfullerene C_{60} and C_{70}. In solid C_{60} there are spaces between the C_{60} balls, either tetrahedral or octahedral in shape. Helium can diffuse into the solid fullerite even at one atmosphere pressure. Helium enters the lattice in two stages. The first rapid stage takes a couple of days, and expands the lattice by 0.16% (that is 2.2 pm) filling the larger octahedral sites. The second stage takes thousands of hours to absorb more helium and expands the lattice twice as much again (0.32%) filling the tetrahedral sites. However the solid C_{60}•3He is not stable and loses helium on a timescale of 340 hours when not under a helium atmosphere. When the helium intercalated fullerite is cooled, it has an orientational phase transition that is 10 K higher than for pure solid C_{60}. The actual discontinuous change in volume at that point is smaller, but there are more rapid changes near the transition temperature, perhaps due to varying occupancy of the voids by helium.

=== Endohedral ===
Helium atoms can be trapped inside molecular cages such as the fullerenes He@C_{60}, He@C_{70}, He_{2}@C_{60} and He_{2}@C_{70} have all been made using compressed helium and fullerenes. When using only pressure and heat, the yield is quite low, under 1%. However, by breaking and reforming the carbon ball, much higher concentrations of He@C_{60} or He@C_{70} can be made. High-performance liquid chromatography can concentrate the helium containing material. HeN@C_{60} and HeN@C_{70} have also been made. These have a lower symmetry due to the two atoms being trapped together in the same cavity. This also causes ESR line broadening.

Dodecahedrane can trap helium from a helium ion beam to yield He@C_{20}H_{20}.

Other cage like inorganic or organic molecules may also trap helium, for example C_{8}He with He inside a cube, or He@Mo_{6}Cl_{8}F_{6}.

== Impurity helium condensates ==
Impurity helium condensates (IHCs) (or impurity helium gels) are deposited as a snow-like gel in liquid helium when various atoms or molecules are absorbed on the surface of superfluid helium. Atoms can include H, N, Na, Ne, Ar, Kr, Xe, alkalis or alkaline earths. The impurities form nanoparticle clusters coated with localised helium held by van der Waals force. Helium atoms are unable to move towards or away from the impurity, but perhaps can move perpendicularly around the impurity. The snow like solid is structured like an aerogel. When free atoms are included in the condensate a high energy density can be achieved, up to 860 J cm^{−1} or 5 kJ g^{−1}. These condensates were first investigated as a possible rocket fuel. The mixtures are given a notation involving square brackets so that [N]/[He] represents a nitrogen atom impurity in helium.

[N]/[He] atomic nitrogen impurity helium is produced when a radio frequency discharge in a nitrogen helium mixture is absorbed into superfluid helium, it can have up to 4% nitrogen atoms included. The substance resembles crumbly snow and condenses and settles from the liquid helium. It also contains variable proportions of N_{2} molecules. This substance is a high energy solid, with as much power as conventional explosives. When it is heated above 2.19 K (the lambda point of helium), the solid decomposes and explodes. This substance is not a true compound, but more like a solid solution. E. B. Gordon et al. suggested that this material may exist in 1974. The localised helium shells around an individual atom are termed van der Waals spheres. However the idea that the nitrogen atoms are dispersed in the helium has been replaced by the concept of nitrogen atoms attached to the surface of clusters of nitrogen molecules. The energy density of the solid can be increased by pressing it.

Other inert gas impurity helium condensates can also be made from a gas beam into superfluid helium. [Ne]/[He] decomposes at 8.5 K with release of heat and formation of solid neon. Its composition approximates NeHe_{16}.

[Ar]/[He] contains 40–60 helium atoms per argon atom.

[Kr]/[He] contains 40–60 helium atoms per krypton atom and is stable up to 20 K.

[Xe]/[He] contains 40–60 helium atoms per xenon atom.

[N_{2}]/[He] contains 12—17 He atoms per N_{2} molecule. It is stable up to 13 K

[N]/[Ne]/[He] Formed from a gas beam generated from a radio-frequency electric discharge in mixtures of neon, nitrogen and helium blown into superfluid He. Additional inert gas stabilises more nitrogen atoms. It decomposes around 7 K with a blue green light flash. Excited nitrogen atoms in the N(^{2}D) state can be relative long lasting, up to hours, and give off a green luminescence.

[H_{2}]/[He], or [D_{2}]/[He] when dihydrogen or dideuterium is absorbed into superfluid helium, filaments are formed. When enough of these form, the solid resembles cotton, rather than snow. Using H_{2} results in the product floating and stopping further production, but with deuterium, or a half-half mixture, it can sink and accumulate. Atomic hydrogen in impurity helium decays fairly rapidly due to quantum tunneling (H + H → H_{2}). Atomic deuterium dimerises slower (D + D → D_{2}), but reacts very quickly with any diprotium present. (D + H_{2} → HD + H). Atomic hydrogen solids are further stabilised by other noble gases such as krypton. Lowering temperatures into the millikelvin range can prolong the lifetime of atomic hydrogen condensates. Condensates containing heavy water or deuterium are under investigation for the production of ultracold neutrons. Other impurity gels have been investigated for producing ultracold neutrons include CD_{4} (deuterated methane) and C_{2}D_{5}OD. (deuterated ethanol)

The water-helium condensate [H_{2}O]/[He] contains water clusters of several nanometers in diameter, and pores from 8 to 800 nm.

Oxygen O_{2} impurity helium contains solid oxygen clusters from 1 to 100 nm.

== Impurity solid helium ==
Introducing impurities into solid helium yields a blue solid that melts at a higher temperature than pure He. For caesium, the absorption has a peak at 750 nm, and for rubidium, maximal absorption is at 640 nm. These are due to metal clusters with diameters of 10 nm or so. However, the low concentration of clusters in this substance should not be sufficient to solidify helium, as the amount of metal in the solid is less than billionth that of the impurity helium condensate solids, and liquid helium does not "wet" caesium metal. The solid is possibly due to helium "snowballs" attached to Cs^{+} (or Rb^{+}) ions. The snowball is a shell that contains helium atoms solidified in particular positions around the ion. The helium atoms are immobilized in the snowball by polarization. Neutral metallic atoms in liquid helium are also surrounded by a bubble caused by electron repulsion. They have typical sizes ranging from 10 to 14 Å diameter. Free electrons in liquid helium are enclosed in a bubble 17 Å in diameter. Under 25 atmosphere pressure an electron bubble reduces to 11 Å.

== Solid solution ==
Helium can dissolve to a limited extent in hot metal, with concentration proportional to pressure. At atmospheric pressure, 500 °C bismuth can absorb 1 part in a billion; at 649 °C lithium can take 5 parts per billion; and at 482 °C potassium can take 2.9 parts per million (all atom fractions). In nickel there can be 1 in 10^{10} atoms, and in gold 1 in 10^{7}. The supposition is that the higher the melting point the less helium can be dissolved. However, when a liquid metal is quenched, higher concentrations of helium can be left dissolved. So cooled liquid steel can have one part per million of helium. In order to get a helium atom into a metal lattice, a hole has to be formed. The energy to make that hole in the metal is basically the heat of solution.

== Nanowires ==
Gold, copper, rubidium, caesium, or barium atoms evaporated into liquid helium form spiderweb-like structures. Rhenium produces nano flakes. Molybdenum, tungsten, and niobium produce thin nanowires with diameters of 20, 25 and 40 Å. When platinum, molybdenum or tungsten is evaporated into liquid helium, nanoclusters are first formed, accompanied by high temperature thermal emission pulse, above the melting point of the metals. In superfluid helium, these clusters migrate to the vortices and weld together to yield nanowires once the clusters are mostly solid. In higher temperature liquid helium, larger clusters of metal are formed instead of wires. The metal vapours can only penetrate about 0.5 mm into liquid helium. Indium, tin, lead and nickel produce nanowires about 80 Å in diameter. These same four metals also produce smooth spheres about 2 μm across that explode when examined with an electron microscope. Copper, permalloy, and bismuth also make nanowires.

== Two-dimensional ionic crystal ==
Helium II ions (He^{+}) in liquid helium when attracted by an electric field can form a two-dimensional crystal at temperatures below 100 mK. There are about half a trillion ions per square meter just below the surface of the helium. Free electrons float above the helium surface.

== Known van der Waals molecules ==
- LiHe
- Dihelium
- Trihelium
- Ag_{3}He
- HeCO is weakly bound by van der Waals forces. It is potentially important in cold interstellar media as both CO and He are common.
- CF_{4}He and CCl_{4}He both exist.
- HeI_{2} can be formed by supersonic expansion of high pressure helium with a trace of iodine into a vacuum. It was the first known triatomic helium van der Waals molecule. It can be detected by fluorescence. HeI_{2} has a similar optical spectrum to I_{2}, except that the bands and lines are shifted to form two extra series. One series is blueshifted by between 2.4 and 4.0 cm^{−1}, and the other between 9.4 and 9.9 cm^{−1}. The two series may be due to different amounts of vibration in the He–I bond. The lines are narrow indicating that the molecules in their excited vibrational state have a long lifetime.
- Na_{2}He molecules can form on the surface of helium nanodroplets.
- NOHe

== Known ions ==
Helium has the highest ionization energy, so a He^{+} ion will strip electrons off any other neutral atom or molecule. However, it can also then bind to the ion produced. The He^{+} ion can be studied in gas, or in liquid helium; Its chemistry is not completely trivial. For example, He^{+} can react with SF_{6} to yield SF^{+}_{6} or SF^{+}_{5} and atomic fluorine.

=== Ionized clusters ===
He^{+}_{2} was predicted to exist by Linus Pauling in 1933. It was discovered when doing mass spectroscopy on ionized helium. The dihelium cation is formed by an ionized helium atom combining with a helium atom: He^{+} + He → He^{+}_{2}.

The diionized dihelium He^{2+}_{2} (^{1}Σ^{+}_{g}) is in a singlet state. It breaks up He^{2+}_{2} → He^{+} + He^{+} releasing 200 kcal/mol of energy. It has a barrier to decomposition of 35 kcal/mol and a bond length of 0.70 Å.

The trihelium cation He^{+}_{3} is in equilibrium with He^{+}_{2} between 135 and 200K.

=== Helium hydride ===
The helium hydride ion HeH^{+} has been known since 1925. The protonated dihelium ion He_{2}H^{+} can be formed when the dihelium cation reacts with dihydrogen: He^{+}_{2} + H_{2} → He_{2}H^{+} + H. This is believed to be a linear molecule. Larger protonated helium cluster ions exist He_{n}H^{+} with n from 3 to 14. He_{6}H^{+} and He_{13}H^{+} appear to be more common. These can be made by reacting H^{+}_{2} or H^{+}_{3} with gaseous helium.

HeH^{2+} is unstable in its ground state, but when it is excited to the 2pσ state, the molecule is bound with an energy of 20 kcal/mol. This doubly charged ion has been made by accelerating the helium hydride ion to 900 keV, and firing it into argon. It has a short life of 4 ns.

H_{2}He^{+} has been made and could occur in nature via H_{2} + He^{+} → H_{2}He^{+}.

H_{3}He^{+}_{n} exists for n from 1 to over 30, and there are also clusters with more hydrogen atoms and helium.

=== Noble gas ===
Noble gas cluster ions exist for different noble gases. Singly charged cluster ions containing xenon exist with the formula He_{n}Xe^{+}_{m}, where n and m ≥ 1.

Many different He_{n}Kr^{+} exist with n between 1 and 17, with higher values possible. He_{n}Kr^{+}_{2} and He_{n}Kr^{+}_{3} also exist for many values of n. He_{12}Kr^{+}_{2} and He_{12}Kr^{+}_{3} ions are common. These singly charged cluster ions can be made from krypton in helium nanodroplets subject to vacuum ultraviolet radiation.

The Ar^{+} argon ion can form many different sized clusters with helium ranging from HeAr^{+} to He_{50}Ar^{+}, but the most common clusters are He_{12}Ar^{+} and smaller. These clusters are made by capturing an argon atom in a liquid helium nanodroplet, and then ionizing with high speed electrons. He^{+} is formed, which can transfer charge to argon and then form a cluster ion when the rest of the droplet evaporates.

NeHe^{+}_{n} can be made by ultraviolet photoionization. Clusters only contain one neon atom. The number of helium atoms can vary from 1 to 23, but NeHe^{+}_{4} and NeHe^{+}_{8} are more likely to be observed.

Doubly charged ions of helium with noble gas atoms also exist including ArHe^{2+}, KrHe^{2+}, and XeHe^{2+}.

=== Metals ===
Various metal-helium ions are known.

Alkali metal helide ions are known for all the alkalis. The molecule ground state for the diatomic ions is in the X^{1}Σ^{+} state. The bond length gets bigger as the periodic table is descended with lengths of 1.96, 2.41, 2.90, 3.10, and 3.38 Å for Li^{+}He, Na^{+}He, K^{+}He, Rb^{+}He, and Cs^{+}He. The dissociation energies are 1.9, 0.9, 0.5, 0.4 and 0.3 kcal/mol, showing bond energy decreases. When the molecule breaks up, the positive charge is never on the helium atom.

When there are many helium atoms around, alkali metal ions can attract shells of helium atoms. Clusters can be formed from absorbing metal into helium droplets. The doped droplets are ionized with high speed electrons. For sodium, clusters appear with the formula Na^{+}He_{n} with n from 1 to 26. Na^{+}He is the most common, but Na^{+}He_{2} is very close in abundance. Na^{+}He_{8} is much more abundant than clusters with more helium, but Na^{+}_{2}He_{n} with n from 1 to 20 also appears. Na^{+}_{3}He_{n} with small n is also made. For potassium, K^{+}He_{n} with n up to 28, and K^{+}_{2}He_{n} for n from 1 to 20 is formed. K^{+}He and K^{+}He_{2} are both common, and K^{+}He_{12} is a bit more commonly formed than other similar sized clusters. Caesium and rubidium cations also form clusters with helium.

Other known metal-helium ions include Cr^{+}He, Co^{+}He, Co^{+}He_{3}, Ni^{+}He, and Ni^{+}He_{3}. PtHe^{2+}; formed by high electric field off platinum surface in helium, VHe^{2+}, HeRh^{2+} is decomposed in high strength electric field, Ta^{2+}He, Mo^{2+}He, W^{2+}He, Re^{2+}He, Ir^{2+}He, Pt^{2+}He_{2}, W^{3+}He_{2}, W^{3+}He_{3}, and W^{3+}He_{4}.

=== Nonmetals ===
HeN^{+}_{2} can form at around 4 K from an ion beam of N^{+}_{2} into cold helium gas. The energy needed to break up the molecule is 140 cm^{−1} which is quite a bit stronger than the van der Waals neutral molecules. HeN^{+}_{2} is tough enough to have several vibrational, bending and rotational states. He_{n}N^{+}_{2} with n from 2 to 6 have been made by shooting electrons at a supersonically expanding mix of nitrogen and helium.

C_{60}He^{+} is formed by irradiating C_{60} with 50eV electrons and then steering ions into cold helium gas. C_{60}He^{+}_{2} is also known.

He(OH)^{+} has been detected, although it is not produced when HTO (tritiated water) decays.

He_{n}(CO)^{+} has been detected for values of n from 1 to 12. Also CH_{3}He^{+}, OCHHe^{+} and NH_{2}He^{+} have been detected.

Young and Coggiola claimed to make HeC^{+} by an electric discharge off graphite into helium.

When tritium substituted methane (CH_{3}T) decays, CH_{3}He^{+} is produced in a very small amount.

The helium formyl cation, HeHCO^{+} is a linear molecule. It has a vibrational frequency red shifted 12.4 cm^{−1} compared to HCO^{+}. It can be considered as a deenergized protonation reaction intermediate for the HeH^{+} + CO → HCO^{+} + He. HeHCO^{+} can be produced by a supersonic expansion of a gas mixture of He, CO, and H_{2}, which is hit by a cross beam of electrons. CO and H_{2} are only supplied at 1% of the helium.

The HeHN^{+}_{2} molecule is linear. The He-H bondlength is 1.72 Å. It has an infrared band, due to B-H stretching, with a base at 3158.42 cm^{−1}. The binding energy is 378 cm^{−1} in the 000 vibrational state, and 431 cm^{−1} in the 100 vibrational state. He_{2}HN^{+}_{2} is also known. One helium atom is linked to a hydrogen, and the other is less tightly bound.

H_{2}O^{+}, H_{2}OSF_{5}^{+}, SF_{5}^{+} and SF_{6}^{+} can form clusters with varying numbers of Helium atoms.

== Excimers ==
The He^{*}_{2} excimer is responsible for the Hopfield continuum. Helium also forms an excimer with barium, Ba^{+}He^{*}.

== Predicted compounds ==
=== Predicted solids ===
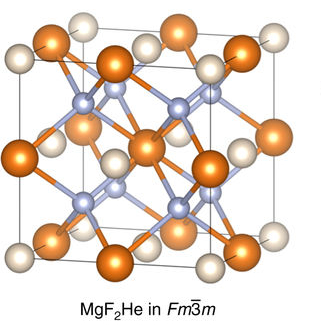
Crystal structure of the hypothetical compound MgF_{2}He. Helium in white, magnesium in orange and fluorine in blue

He(H_{2}O)_{2} is predicted to form a solid with orthorhombic structure Ibam.

Iron helide (FeHe) was early on claimed to have been found, but the discovery was classified as an alloy. Early studies predicted the FeHe exists as an interstitial compound under high pressure, perhaps in dense planetary cores, or, as suggested by Freeman Dyson, in neutron star crust material. Recent density functional theory calculations predict the formation of FeHe compounds at pressures above about 4 TPa, suggesting indeed that these compounds could be found inside giant planets, white dwarf stars, or neutron stars.

Na_{2}HeO is predicted to have a similar structure to Na_{2}He, but with oxygen atoms in the same position as the electron pair, so that it becomes O^{2−}. It would be stable from 13 to 106 GPa. This substance could be a way to store helium in a solid.

La_{2/3-x}Li_{3x}TiO_{3}He is a porous lithium ion conduction perovskite that can contain helium like a clathrate.

Helium is predicted to be included under pressure in ionic compounds of the form A_{2}B or AB_{2}. These compounds could include Na_{2}OHe, MgF_{2}He (over 107 GPa) and CaF_{2}He (30-110 GPa). Stabilisation occurs by the helium atom positioning itself between the two like charged ions, and partially shielding them from each other.

Helium is predicted to form an inclusion compound with silicon, Si_{2}He. This has a hexagonal lattice of silicon atoms with helium atoms lined up in the channels. It should be formed when liquid silicon is injected with helium at over 1GPa and cooled.

Helium is predicted to form a fluoride He_{3}F_{2} under extreme pressures well over 1 Tpa.

=== Predicted van der Waals molecules ===
The beryllium oxide helium adduct, HeBeO is believed to be bonded much more strongly than a normal van der Waals molecule with about 5 kcal/mol of binding energy. The bond is enhanced by a dipole induced positive charge on beryllium, and a vacancy in the σ orbital on beryllium where it faces the helium.

Variations on the beryllium oxide adduct include HeBe_{2}O_{2}, RNBeHe including HNBeHe, CH_{3}NBeHe, CH_{4−x}NBeHe_{x}, SiH_{4−x}NBeHe_{x}, NH_{3−x}NBeHe_{x}, PH_{3−x}NBeHe_{x}, OH_{2−x}NBeHe_{x}, SH_{2−x}NBeHe_{x}, and HeBe(C_{5}H_{5})^{+}.

Hydridohelium fluoride (HHeF) is predicted to have a lifetime of 157 femtoseconds with a 5 kcal/mol barrier. The lifetime of the deuterium isotopomer is predicted to be much longer due to a greater difficulty of tunneling for deuterium. This molecule's metastability is slated due to electrostatic attraction between HHe^{+} and F^{−} which increases the barrier to an exothermic breakup. Under pressures over 23 GPa HHeF should be stable.

Calculations for coinage metal fluorides include HeCuF as stable, HeAgF is unstable, HeAuF is predicted, and Ag^{3}He with binding energy 1.4 cm^{−1}, Ag^{4}He binding energy 1.85 cm^{−1}, Au^{3}He binding energy 4.91 cm^{−1}, and Au^{4}He binding energy 5.87 cm^{−1}

HeNaO is predicted.

Calculation for binary van der Waals helium molecules include HeNe, Li^{4}He binding energy 0.008 cm^{−1}, the Li^{3}He is not stable. Na^{4}He binding energy 0.03 cm^{−1}, the Na^{3}He is not stable. Cu^{3}He binding energy 0.90 cm^{−1}, O^{4}He binding energy 5.83 cm^{−1}, S^{4}He binding energy 6.34 cm^{−1}, Se^{4}He binding energy 6.50 cm^{−1}, F^{4}He binding energy 3.85 cm^{−1}, Cl^{4}He binding energy 7.48 cm^{−1}, Br^{4}He binding energy 7.75 cm^{−1}, I^{4}He binding energy 8.40 cm^{−1}, N^{4}He binding energy 2.85 cm^{−1}, P^{4}He binding energy 3.42 cm^{−1}, As^{4}He binding energy 3.49 cm^{−1}, Bi^{4}He binding energy 33.26 cm^{−1}, Si^{4}He binding energy 1.95 cm^{−1}, Ge^{4}He binding energy 2.08 cm^{−1}, CaH^{4}He binding energy 0.96 cm^{−1}, NH^{4}He binding energy 4.42 cm^{−1}, MnH^{4}He binding energy 1.01 cm^{−1}, YbF^{4}He binding energy 5.57 cm^{−1} I^{4}_{2}He or I^{3}_{2}He,

Bonds are predicted to form to nickel with helium as a weak ligand in HeNiCO and HeNiN_{2}.

(HeO)(LiF)_{2} is predicted to form a planar metastable molecule. 1-Tris(pyrazolyl)borate beryllium and 1-tris(pyrazolyl)borate magnesium are predicted to bind helium at low temperatures. There is also a prediction of a He-O bond in a molecule with caesium fluoride or tetramethyl ammonium fluoride.

LiHe_{2} is predicted to be in an Efimov state when excited.

=== Predicted ions ===
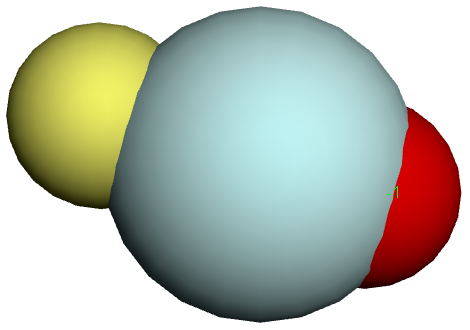
Fluoroheliate ion

Many ions have been investigated theoretically to see if they could exist. Just about every diatomic cation with helium has been studied. For the diatomic dications, for stability the second ionization level of the partner atom has to be below the first ionization level of helium, 24.6 eV. For Li, F, and Ne the ground state is repulsive, so molecules will not form. For N and O the molecule would break up to release He^{+}. However HeBe^{2+}, HeB^{2+} and HeC^{2+} are predicted to be stable. Also second row elements from Na to Cl are predicted to have a stable HeX^{2+} ion.

HeY^{3+} is predicted to be the lightest stable diatomic triply charged ion. Other possibly thermochemically stable ions include HeZr^{3+}, HeHf^{3+}, HeLa^{3+}, HeNd^{3+}, HeCe^{3+}, HePr^{3+}, HePm^{3+}, HeSm^{3+}, HeGa^{3+}, HeTb^{3+}, HeDy^{3+}, HeHo^{3+}, HeEr^{3+}, HeTm^{3+}, and HeLu^{3+} where the third ionization point is below that of helium.

The positronium helide ion PsHe^{+} should be formed when positrons encounter helium.

The Fluoroheliate FHeO^{−} ion should be stable but salts like LiFHeO are not stable.

- HHeCO^{+} theoretical
- FHeS^{−} is predicted to be stable.
- FHeBN^{−}
- HHeN^{2+} is unlikely to exist.
- (HHe^{+})(OH_{2}) is probably unstable.

The lithium hydrohelide cation HLiHe^{+} is linear in theory. This molecular ion could exist with big bang nucleosynthesis elements. Other hydrohelide cations that exist in theory are HNaHe^{+} sodium hydrohelide cation, HKHe^{+} potassium hydrohelide cation, HBeHe^{2+} beryllium hydrohelide cation, HMgHe^{2+} magnesium hydrohelide cation, and HCaHe^{2+} calcium hydrohelide cation.

HeBeO^{+} is predicted to have a relatively high binding energy of 25 kcal mol^{−1}. Similarly the ethynylhelium cation [HeC≡CH]^{+} is predicted to be bound (with respect to ethynyl cation and helium) by 22 kcal/mol. However, vinylhelium ([HeCH=CH_{2}]^{+}, 0.03 kcal/mol) and methylhelium ([HeCH_{3}]^{+}, 1.5 kcal/mol) cations are predicted to be bound much more weakly.

- HCHe^{+}
- HCHeHe^{+}

For negative ions the adduct is very weakly bound. Those studied include HeCl^{−}, HeBr^{−}, HeF^{−}, HeO^{−} and HeS^{−}.

- FHeS^{−}
- FHeSe^{−}
- C_{7}H_{6}He^{2+}
- C_{7}H_{6}HeHe^{2+}
- FHeCC^{−}
- HHeOH^{+}_{2}
- HHeBF^{+}
- HeNC^{+}
- HeNN^{+}
- HHeNN^{+} H-He 0.765 Å He-N bond length 2.077 Å. Decomposition barrier of 2.3 kJ/mol.

HHeNH^{+}_{3} is predicted to have a C_{3v} symmetry and a H-He bond length of 0.768 Å and He-N 1.830. The energy barrier against decomposition to ammonium is 19.1 kJ/mol with an energy release of 563.4 kJ/mol. Cleavage to helium hydride ion and ammonia is predicted to be endothermic, requiring 126.2 kJ/mol.

== Discredited or unlikely observations ==
Numerous researchers attempted to create chemical compounds of helium in the early part of the twentieth century. In 1895 L. Troost and L. Ouvrard believed they had witnessed a reaction between magnesium vapour and helium (and also argon) due to the spectrum of helium disappearing from the tube they were passing it through. In 1906, W. Ternant Cooke claimed to have noticed a reaction of helium with cadmium or mercury vapour by observing an increase in the density of the vapour. Zinc vapour did not react with helium.

J. J. Manley claimed to have found gaseous mercury helide HeHg in 1925 HgHe_{10}; publishing the results in Nature, but then had trouble finding a stable composition, and eventually gave up.

Morrison thought that helium, if irradiated so that one electron is pushed to a higher orbit, would behave like hydrogen. Consequently, he predicted that radioactive elements might form helides, and claimed in 1928 to succeed in forming a compound of helium with lead-214, and a compound of helium with bismuth-214.

Between 1925 and 1940 in Buenos Aires, Horacio Damianovich studied various metal–helium combinations including beryllium (BeHe), iron (FeHe), palladium (PdHe), platinum (Pt_{3}He), bismuth, and uranium. To make these substances, electrical discharges impacted helium into the surface of the metal. Later these were demoted from the status of compounds, to that of alloys.

Platinum helide, Pt_{3}He was discredited by J. G. Waller in 1960.

Palladium helide, PdHe is formed from tritium decay in palladium tritide, the helium (^{3}He) is retained in the solid as a solution.

Boomer claimed the discovery of tungsten helide WHe_{2} as a black solid. It is formed by way of an electric discharge in helium with a heated tungsten filament. When dissolved in nitric acid or potassium hydroxide, tungstic acid forms and helium escapes in bubbles. The electric discharge had a current of 5 mA and 1,000 V at a pressure between 0.05 and 0.5 mmHg for the helium. The process works slowly at 200 V. and 0.02 mmHg of mercury vapour accelerates tungsten evaporation by five times. The search for this was suggested by Ernest Rutherford. It was discredited by J. G. Waller in 1960. Boomer also studied mercury, iodine, sulfur, and phosphorus combinations with helium. Mercury and iodine helium combinations decomposed around −70 °C Sulfur and phosphorus helium combinations decomposed around −120 °C

- Bismuth dihelide, BiHe_{2}

H. Krefft and R. Rompe claimed reactions between helium and sodium, potassium, zinc, rubidium, indium, and thallium.
