= Ursin =

Ursin a surname. Notable people with the surname include:

- Georg Frederik Ursin (1797–1849), Danish mathematician and astronomer
- Holger Ursin (1934–2016), Norwegian physician and psychologist
- Rupert Ursin (born 1973), Austrian quantum physicist
- Nils Robert af Ursin (1854–1936), Finnish secondary school teacher and politician

== See also ==
- La Chapelle-Saint-Ursin, commune in the Cher department in the Centre region of France
- Ursin Durand (1682–1771), French Benedictine of the Maurist Congregation and historian
- Ursins (disambiguation), municipality in the district of Jura-Nord Vaudois of the canton of Vaud in Switzerland
