= Triatomic molecule =

Molecules made of three atoms

Carbon dioxide

Triatomic molecules are molecules composed of three atoms, of either the same or different chemical elements. Examples include H_{2}O, CO_{2} (pictured), HCN, O_{3} (ozone) and NO_{2}.

== Molecular vibrations ==
The vibrational modes of a triatomic molecule can be determined in specific cases.

=== Symmetric linear molecules ===
A symmetric linear molecule ABA can perform:

- Antisymmetric longitudinal vibrations with frequency

$$\omega_a=\sqrt{\frac{k_1M}{m_Am_B}}$$

- Symmetric longitudinal vibrations with frequency

$$\omega_{s1}=\sqrt{\frac{k_1}{m_A}}$$

- Symmetric transversal vibrations with frequency

$$\omega_{s2}=\sqrt{\frac{2k_2M}{m_Am_B}}$$

In the previous formulas, M is the total mass of the molecule, m_{A} and m_{B} are the masses of the elements A and B, k_{1} and k_{2} are the spring constants of the molecule along its axis and perpendicular to it.

== Types ==
=== Homonuclear ===
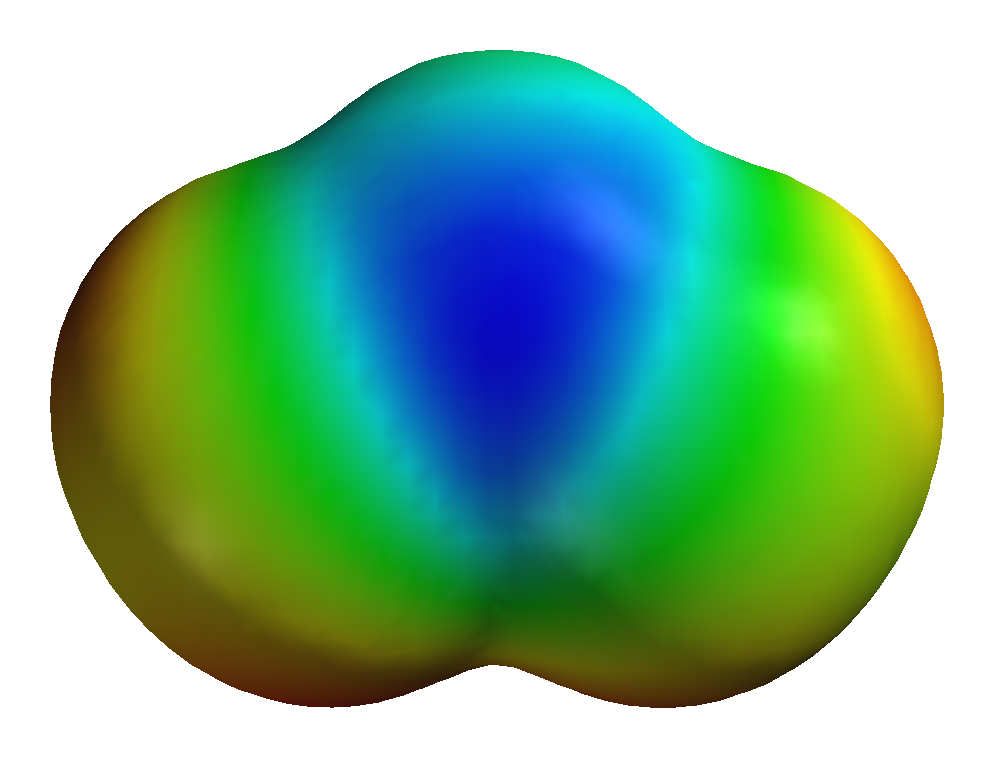
Ozone, O_{3}

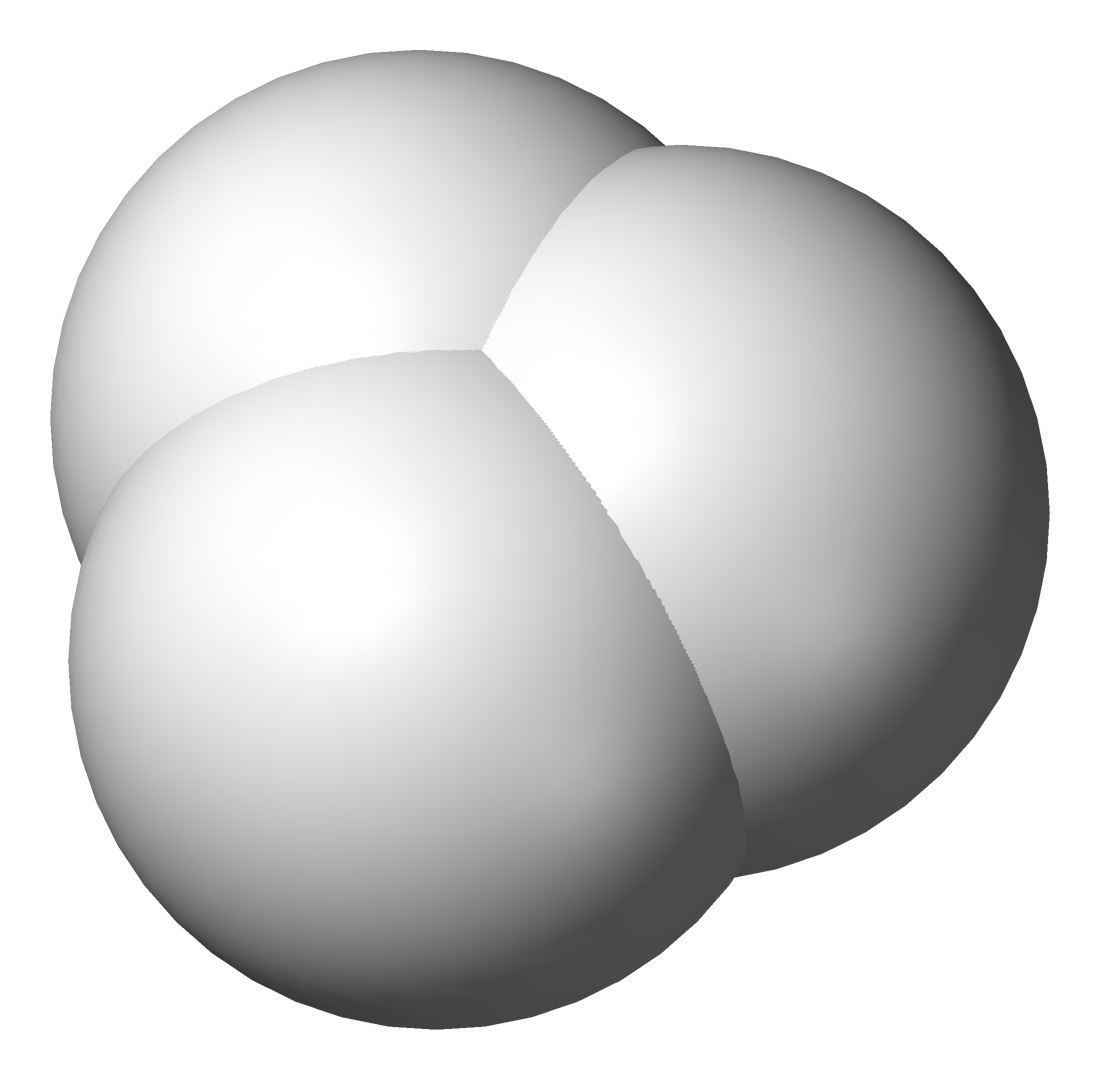
Trihydrogen cation, H_{3}^{+}

Homonuclear triatomic molecules contain three of the same kind of atom. That molecule will be an allotrope of that element.

Ozone, O_{3} is an example of a triatomic molecule with all atoms the same. Triatomic hydrogen, H_{3}, is unstable and breaks up spontaneously. H_{3}^{+}, the trihydrogen cation is stable by itself and is symmetric. ^{4}He_{3}, the helium trimer is only weakly bound by van der Waals force and is in an Efimov state. Trisulfur (S_{3}) is analogous to ozone.

== Geometry ==
All triatomic molecules may be classified as possessing either a linear, bent, or cyclic geometry.

=== Linear ===
Linear triatomic molecules owe their geometry to their sp or sp^{3}d hybridised central atoms. Well-known linear triatomic molecules include carbon dioxide (CO_{2}) and hydrogen cyanide (HCN).

Xenon difluoride (XeF_{2}) is one of the rare examples of a linear triatomic molecule possessing non-bonded pairs of electrons on the central atom.
