= Crystalline coatings =

Crystalline coatings (or crystalline mirrors) are a type of thin-film optical interference coating that is made by merging monocrystalline multilayers deposited via processes such as molecular-beam epitaxy (MBE) and metalorganic vapour-phase epitaxy (MOVPE) with microfabrication techniques including direct bonding and selective etching. In this technique heterostructures such as gallium arsenide / aluminum gallium arsenide (GaAs/AlGaAs) distributed Bragg reflectors (DBRs) are grown and then transferred to polished optical surfaces, resulting in high-performance single-crystal optical coatings on arbitrary, including curved, substrates. As of 2024 the maximum diameter achievable is 20 cm, limited by commercially available GaAs wafers. The tightest curvature demonstrated for such coatings is 5 cm.

The substrate-transferred crystalline coating process was developed in 2013 by Garrett Cole and colleagues at the Institute for Quantum Optics and Quantum Information at the Austrian Academy of Sciences and the University of Vienna. With additional refinement, the technique became capable of generating high-reflectivity mirrors with optical losses on par with the best ion-beam-sputtered coatings, with optical absorption in the 1000–2000 nm spectral range demonstrated to be < 1 part-per-million (ppm) and optical scatter < 3 ppm in the best optics. Additional advantages of these coatings include:

1. Significantly reduced elastic losses (at least a factor of 10 over typical amorphous interference coatings) resulting in minimal thermal noise, enabling ultrastable interferometers for optical atomic clocks and gravitational-wave detectors such as LIGO.
2. The realization of ppm-levels of optical losses (absorption + scatter) in the mid-infrared spectral region demonstrating enhancement cavities for cavity ring-down spectrometers with a finesse > 400 000 at wavelengths to ~4500 nm.
3. High thermal conductivity, over 20 times higher than typical metal-oxide based coatings, making crystalline coatings promising for high-power continuous wave (CW) and quasi-CW lasers, with a CW damage threshold of 75 MW/cm^{2} demonstrated in a deformable mirror device at 1064 nm.

Owing to the low Brownian noise of crystalline coatings, when implemented in optical reference cavities, these mirrors enable laser systems with record-low levels of instability. This technology has also led to a number of advancements in quantum-limited interferometry, with crystalline mirrors being instrumental in efforts relevant to macroscopic quantum phenomena and enabling the demonstration of ponderomotive squeezing at room temperature, the broadband reduction of quantum radiation pressure noise via squeezed light injection, and the room temperature measurement of quantum back action in the audio band.

Garrett Cole and Markus Aspelmeyer founded Crystalline Mirror Solutions in 2013 to commercialize the technology. They were awarded second prize from the Berthold Leibinger Innovationspreis in 2016. The company was acquired by Thorlabs in December 2019 and rebranded as Thorlabs Crystalline Solutions.
