= Helium dimer =

Chemical compound

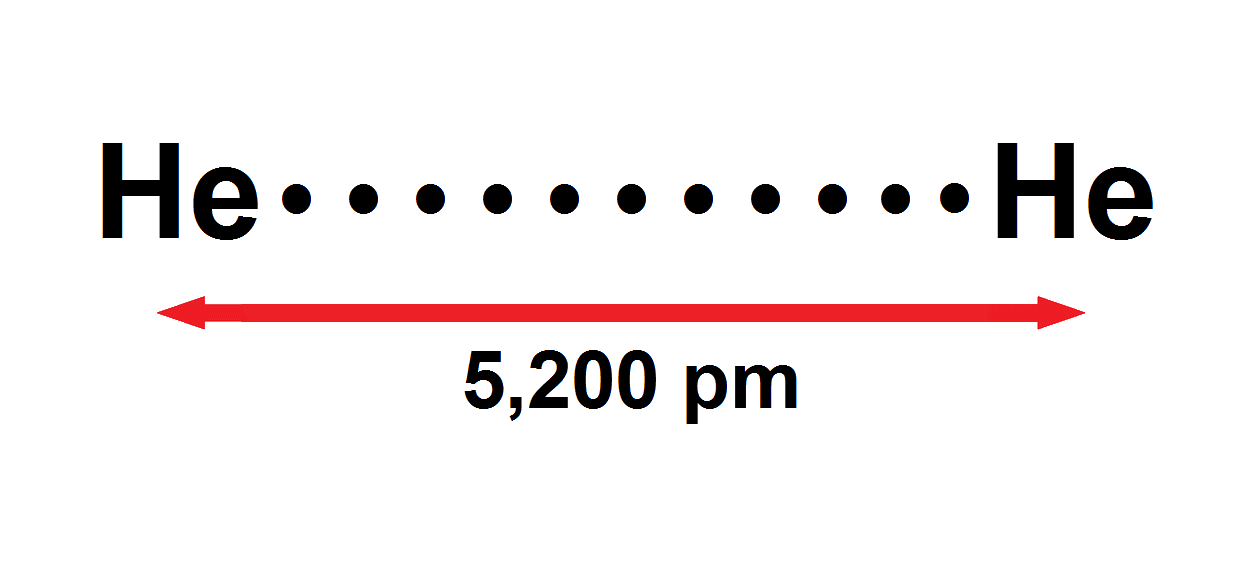

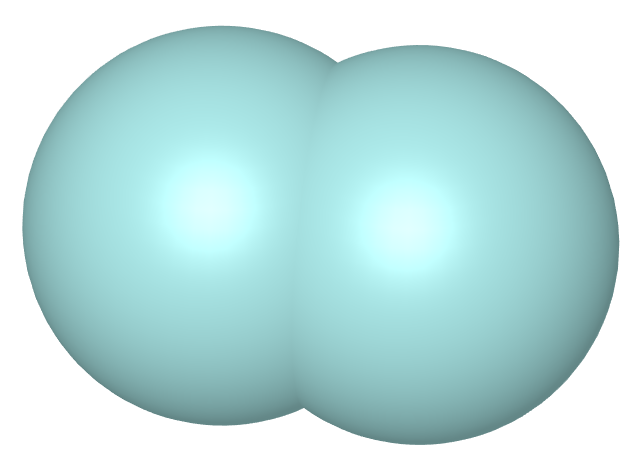

Names
- Other names dihelium

Identifiers
CAS Number	12184-98-4
3D model (JSmol)	Interactive image
ChEBI	CHEBI:33685
Gmelin Reference	48
PubChem CID	19357400
CompTox Dashboard (EPA)	DTXSID001032949
- InChI: : InChI=1S/He2/c1-2 Key: GHVQTHCLRQIINU-UHFFFAOYSA-N
- SMILES: [He][He]

Properties
Chemical formula	He_{2}
Molar mass	8.005204 g·mol^{−1}
Appearance	colorless gas

Thermochemistry
Std enthalpy of formation (Δ_{f}H^{⦵}_{298})	-1.1×10^{−5} kcal/mol

Related compounds
Related van der Waals molecules	LiHe NeHe_{2} He_{3}
- Except where otherwise noted, data are given for materials in their standard state (at 25 °C [77 °F], 100 kPa). (what is ?) Infobox references

A helium dimer is a molecule composed of two helium atoms. One type of helium dimer is a van der Waals molecule with formula He_{2} consisting of two helium atoms. This chemical is the largest diatomic molecule—a molecule consisting of two atoms bonded together. The bond that holds this dimer together is so weak that it will break if the molecule rotates or vibrates too much. It can only exist at very low cryogenic temperatures.

Another type of helium dimer is two excited helium atoms bonded to each other. This form is called an excimer, and was discovered from a spectrum of helium that contained bands first seen in 1912. Written as He_{2}^{*} with the * meaning an excited state, it is the first known Rydberg molecule.

Several dihelium ions also exist, having net charges of negative one, positive one, and positive two. Also two helium atoms can be confined together without bonding in the cage of a fullerene.

== Molecule ==
Based on molecular orbital theory, He_{2} should not exist, and a chemical bond cannot form between the atoms. However, the van der Waals force exists between helium atoms as shown by the existence of liquid helium, and at a certain range of distances between atoms the attraction exceeds the repulsion. So a molecule composed of two helium atoms bound by the van der Waals force can exist. The existence of this molecule was proposed as early as 1937.

He_{2} is the largest known molecule of two atoms when in its ground state, due to its extremely long bond length. The He_{2} molecule has a large separation distance between the atoms of about 5,200 picometres (52 Å). This is the largest for a diatomic molecule without rovibronic excitation. The binding energy is only about 1.3 mK, 10^{−7} eV or 1.1×10^{−5} kcal/mol.

Both helium atoms in the dimer can be ionized by a single photon with energy 63.86 eV. The proposed mechanism for this double ionization is that the photon ejects an electron from one atom, and then that electron hits the other helium atom and ionizes that as well. The dimer then explodes as two helium cations repel each other, moving with the same speed but in opposite directions.

A dihelium molecule bound by Van der Waals forces was first proposed by John Clarke Slater in 1928.

== Formation ==
The helium dimer can be formed in small amounts when helium gas expands and cools as it passes through a nozzle in a gas beam. Only the isotope ^{4}He can form molecules like this; ^{4}He^{3}He and ^{3}He^{3}He do not exist, as they do not have a stable bound state. The amount of the dimer formed in the gas beam is of the order of one percent.

== Molecular ions ==
He_{2}^{+} is a related ion bonded by a half covalent bond. It can be formed in a helium electrical discharge. It recombines with electrons to form an electronically excited He_{2}(a^{3}Σ^{+}_{u}) excimer molecule. Both of these molecules are much smaller with more normally sized interatomic distances. He_{2}^{+} reacts with N_{2}, Ar, Xe, O_{2}, and CO_{2} to form cations and neutral helium atoms.

The helium dication dimer He_{2}^{2+} releases a large amount energy when it dissociates, around 835 kJ/mol. However, an energy barrier of 138.91 kJ/mol prevents immediate decay. This ion was studied theoretically by Linus Pauling in 1933. This ion is isoelectronic with the hydrogen molecule. He_{2}^{2+} is the smallest possible molecule with a double positive charge. It is detectable using mass spectroscopy.

The negative helium dimer He_{2}^{−} is metastable and was discovered by Bae, Coggiola and Peterson in 1984 by passing He_{2}^{+} through caesium vapor. Subsequently, H. H. Michels theoretically confirmed its existence and concluded that the ^{4}Π_{g} state of He_{2}^{−} is bound relative to the a^{2}Σ^{+}_{u} state of He_{2}. The calculated electron affinity is 0.233 eV compared to 0.077 eV for the He^{−}[^{4}P^{∘}] ion. The He_{2}^{−} decays through the long-lived 5/2g component with τ~350 μsec and the much shorter-lived 3/2g, 1/2g components with τ~10 μsec. The ^{4}Π_{g} state has a 1σ^{2}_{g}1σ_{u}2σ_{g}2π_{u} electronic configuration, its electron affinity E is 0.18±0.03 eV, and its lifetime is 135±15 μsec; only the v=0 vibrational state is responsible for this long-lived state.

The molecular helium anion is also found in liquid helium that has been excited by electrons with an energy level higher than 22 eV. This takes place firstly by penetration of liquid He, taking 1.2 eV, followed by excitation of a He atom electron to the ^{3}P level, which takes 19.8 eV. The electron can then combine with another helium atom and the excited helium atom to form He_{2}^{−}. He_{2}^{−} repels helium atoms, and so has a void around it. It will tend to migrate to the surface of liquid helium.

== Excimers ==
In a normal helium atom, two electrons are found in the 1s orbital. However, if sufficient energy is added, one electron can be elevated to a higher energy level. This high energy electron can become a valence electron, and the electron that remains in the 1s orbital is a core electron. Two excited helium atoms can form a covalent bond, creating a molecule called dihelium that lasts for times from the order of a microsecond up to second or so. (Excited helium atoms in the 2^{3}S state can last for up to an hour, and react like alkali metal atoms.)

The first clues that dihelium exists were noticed in 1900 when W. Heuse observed a band spectrum in a helium discharge. However, no information about the nature of the spectrum was published. Independently E. Goldstein from Germany and W. E. Curtis from London published details of the spectrum in 1913. Curtis was called away to military service in World War I, and the study of the spectrum was continued by Alfred Fowler. Fowler recognised that the double headed bands fell into two sequences analogous to principal and diffuse series in line spectra.

The emission band spectrum shows a number of bands that degrade towards the red, meaning that the lines thin out and the spectrum weakens towards the longer wavelengths. Only one band with a green band head at 5732 Å degrades towards the violet. Other strong band heads are at 6400 (red), 4649, 4626, 4546, 4157.8, 3777, 3677, 3665, 3356.5, and 3348.5 Å. There are also some headless bands and extra lines in the spectrum. Weak bands are found with heads at 5133 and 5108.

If the valence electron is in a 2s 3s, or 3d orbital, a ^{1}Σ_{u} state results; if it is in 2p 3p or 4p, a ^{1}Σ_{g} state results. The ground state is X^{1}Σ_{g}^{+}.

The three lowest triplet states of He_{2} have designations a^{3}Σ_{u}, b^{3}Π_{g} and c^{3}Σ_{g}. The a^{3}Σ_{u} state with no vibration (v=0) has a long metastable lifetime of 18 s, much longer than the lifetime for other states or inert gas excimers. The explanation is that the a^{3}Σ_{u} state has no electron orbital angular momentum, as all the electrons are in S orbitals for the helium state.

The lower lying singlet states of He_{2} are A^{1}Σ_{u}, B^{1}Π_{g} and C^{1}Σ_{g}. The excimer molecules are much smaller and more tightly bound than the van der Waals bonded helium dimer. For the A^{1}Σ_{u} state the binding energy is around 2.5 eV, with a separation of the atoms of 103.9 pm. The C^{1}Σ_{g} state has a binding energy 0.643 eV and the separation between atoms is 109.1 pm. These two states have a repulsive range of distances with a maximum around 300 pm, where if the excited atoms approach, they have to overcome an energy barrier. The singlet state A^{1}Σ^{+}_{u} is very unstable with a lifetime only nanoseconds long.

The spectrum of the He_{2} excimer contains bands due to a great number of lines due to transitions between different rotation rates and vibrational states, combined with different electronic transitions. The lines can be grouped into P, Q and R branches. But the even numbered rotational levels do not have Q branch lines, due to both nuclei being spin 0. Numerous electronic states of the molecule have been studied, including Rydberg states with the number of the shell up to 25.

Helium discharge lamps produce vacuum ultraviolet radiation from helium molecules. When high energy protons hit helium gas it also produces UV emission at around 600 Å by the decay of excited highly vibrating molecules of He_{2} in the A^{1}Σ_{u} state to the ground state. The UV radiation from excited helium molecules is used in the pulsed discharge ionization detector (PDHID) which is capable of detecting the contents of mixed gases at levels below parts per billion.

The Hopfield continuum (named after J. J. Hopfield) is a band of ultraviolet light between 600 and 1000 Å in wavelength formed by photodissociation of helium molecules.

One mechanism for formation of the helium molecules is firstly a helium atom becomes excited with one electron in the 2^{1}S orbital. This excited atom meets two other non excited helium atoms in a three body association and reacts to form a A^{1}Σ_{u} state molecule with maximum vibration and a helium atom.

Helium molecules in the quintet state ^{5}Σ^{+}_{g} can be formed by the reaction of two spin polarised helium atoms in He(2^{3}S_{1}) states. This molecule has a high energy level of 20 eV. The highest vibration level allowed is v=14.

In liquid helium the excimer forms a solvation bubble. In a ^{3}d state a He^{*}_{2} molecule is surrounded by a bubble 12.7 Å in radius at atmospheric pressure. When pressure is increased to 24 atmospheres the bubble radius shrinks to 10.8 Å. This changing bubble size causes a shift in the fluorescence bands.

state	K	electronic angular momentum Λ	electronic spin S	Hund's coupling case	type	energy	dissociation energy eV	length pm	vibration levels
A^{1}Σ_{u}	1,3,5,7				singlet		2.5	103.9	
B^{1}Π_{g}					singlet				
C^{1}Σ_{g}	0,2,4,6				singlet				
a^{3}Σ_{u}	1,3,5,7				triplet				
b^{3}Π_{g}					triplet				
c^{3}Σ_{g}	0,2,4,6	0	1	b	triplet				
^{5}Σ^{+}_{g}					quintet				

== Magnetic condensation ==
In very strong magnetic fields, (around 750,000 tesla) and low enough temperatures, helium atoms attract, and can even form linear chains. This may happen in white dwarfs and neutron stars. The bond length and dissociation energy both increase as the magnetic field increases.

== Use ==
The dihelium excimer is an important component in the helium discharge lamp.

A second use of dihelium ion is in ambient ionization techniques using low temperature plasma. In this helium atoms are excited, and then combine to yield the dihelium ion. The He_{2}^{+} goes on to react with N_{2} in the air to make N_{2}^{+}. These ions react with a sample surface to make positive ions that are used in mass spectroscopy. The plasma containing the helium dimer can be as low as 30 °C in temperature, and this reduces heat damage to samples.

== Clusters ==
He_{2} has been shown to form van der Waals compounds with other atoms forming bigger clusters such as ^{24}MgHe_{2} and ^{40}CaHe_{2}.

The helium-4 trimer (^{4}He_{3}), a cluster of three helium atoms, is predicted to have an excited state which is an Efimov state. This has been confirmed experimentally in 2015.

== Cage ==
Two helium atoms can fit inside larger fullerenes, including C_{70} and C_{84}. These can be detected by the nuclear magnetic resonance of ^{3}He having a small shift, and by mass spectrometry. C_{84} with enclosed helium can contain 20% He_{2}@C_{84}, whereas C_{78} has 10% and C_{76} has 8%. The larger cavities are more likely to hold more atoms. Even when the two helium atoms are placed closely to each other in a small cage, there is no chemical bond between them. The presence of two He atoms in a C_{60} fullerene cage is only predicted to have a small effect on the reactivity of the fullerene. The effect is to have electrons withdrawn from the endohedral helium atoms, giving them a slight positive partial charge to produce He_{2}^{δ+}, which have a stronger bond than uncharged helium atoms. However, by the Löwdin definition there is a bond present.

The two helium atoms inside the C_{60} cage are separated by 1.979 Å and the distance from a helium atom to the carbon cage is 2.507 Å. The charge transfer gives 0.011 electron charge units to each helium atom. There should be at least 10 vibrational levels for the He-He pair.
