= Rudolf Grimm =

Austrian physicist (born 1961)

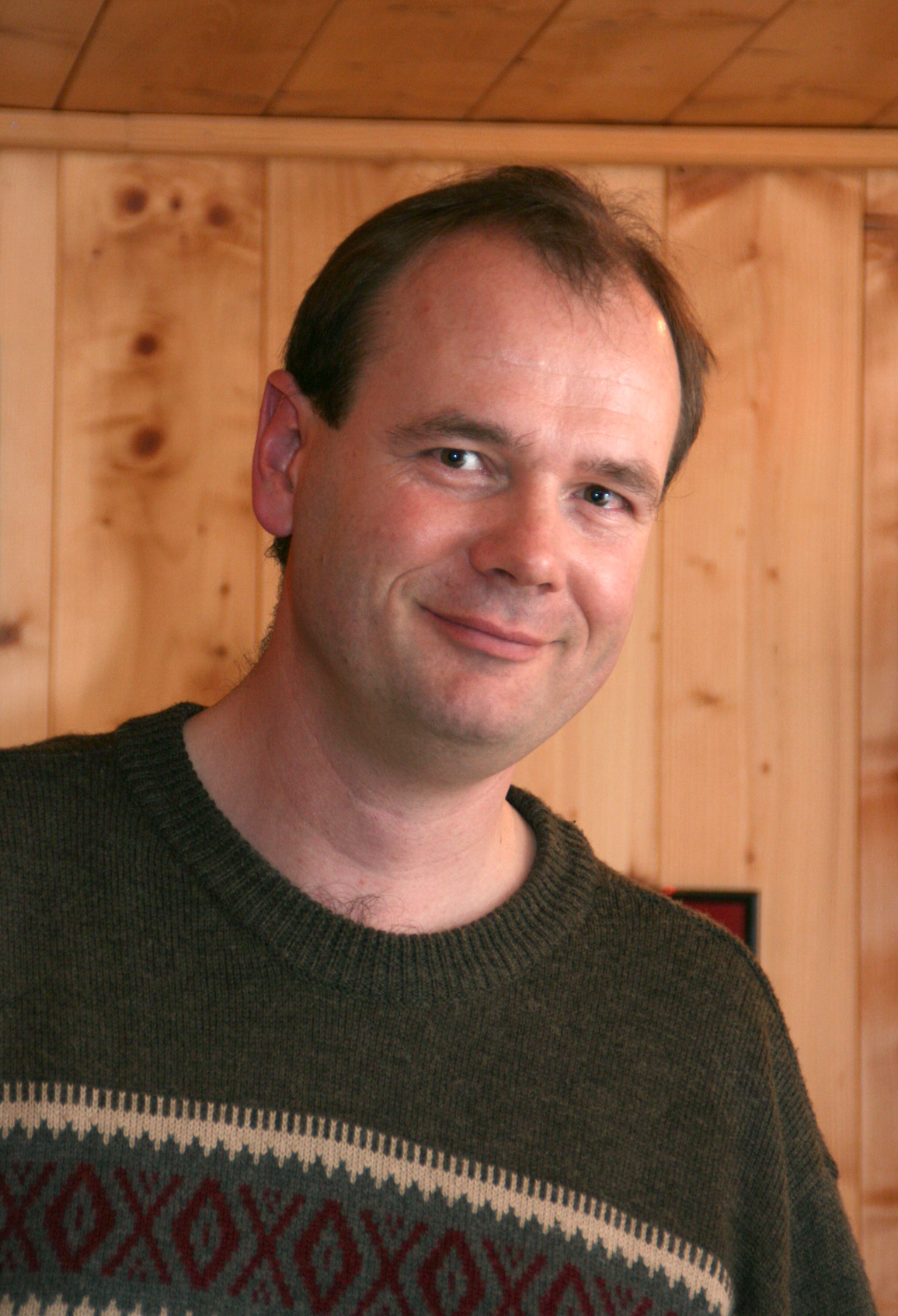
- Born: 10 November 1961 (age 64); Mannheim, West Germany
- Education: University of Hannover
- Known for: ultracold atoms, Bose–Einstein condensation
- Awards: Wittgenstein Award (2005)
- Scientific career
- Fields: Physicist
- Workplaces: University of Innsbruck
- Thesis: Light-pressure-induced phenomena in an atomic gas : modification of absorption and dispersion profiles (1989)
- Doctoral advisor: Jürgen Mlynek; Hans Melchior

Rudolf Grimm (born 10 November 1961) is an experimental physicist from Austria. His work centres on ultracold atoms and quantum gases. He was the first scientist worldwide who, with his team, succeeded in realizing a Bose–Einstein condensation of non-polar molecules.

== Career ==
Grimm graduated in physics from the University of Hannover in 1986. From 1986 to 1989 he was a post-graduate researcher at the ETH Zurich (Swiss Federal Institute of Technology), then went on to the Institute of Spectroscopy of the USSR Academy of Sciences in Troitsk near Moscow for half a year. He spent the next ten years in Heidelberg as a researcher at the Max Planck Institute for Nuclear Physics. In 1994, Grimm applied to the University of Heidelberg to qualify as a professor by receiving the "venia docendi" in experimental physics. In the year 2000, he was appointed to a chair in experimental physics at the University of Innsbruck, where he has been Dean of the Faculty for Mathematics, Computer Science and Physics since 2005 and Director of the Research Center for Quantum Physics from 2006. Since 2003, Grimm has also held the position of Scientific Director at the Institute for Quantum Optics and Quantum Information (IQOQI) of the Austrian Academy of Sciences (ÖAW). Grimm is married, with three children.

== Research ==
The work of the experimental physicist concentrates on Bose–Einstein condensation of atoms and molecules and on fermionic quantum gases. In 2002 his working group succeeded for the first time ever to produce a Bose–Einstein condensate from caesium atoms. In the following year, the team produced the first Bose–Einstein condensate of molecules (simultaneously with Deborah S. Jin's group at JILA, Boulder, Colorado). In 2004, the Innsbruck scientists achieved a Fermionic condensate. In his work on collective oscillations and pairing energies, Grimm found first evidence of the flow of particles without any loss of energy (superfluidity) in Fermi condensates. Meanwhile, Grimm and his team have succeeded in producing more complex molecules in ultracold quantum gases. Currently Grimm is concentrating his efforts on producing mixed condensation from atoms of different elements. In 2006, his working group also managed to lift the veil on an old mystery of physics: they succeeded in the first experimental observation of Efimov states, mysterious quantum states that the Russian scientist Vitali Efimov had theoretically predicted in the early 1970s.

== Awards ==
Grimm has received numerous awards for his achievements. In 2005 he was presented with the Wittgenstein Award, Austria's highest scientific accolade. In the same year, the Austrian daily paper Die Presse made him „Austrian (Researcher) of the Year 2005". Years before, he had won the Gerhard Hess Prize, a new blood stipend of the German Research Foundation (DFG) (1996), and the Silver Medal of the ETH Zurich (1989). Recently he received the Beller Lectureship Award of the American Physical Society (APS) (2007), the Science Award of the Region of Tyrol (2008) and was named „Austrian Scientist of the Year 2009" by the Austrian Club of Education and Science Journalists. In 2018, he was honored jointly with Vitaly Efimov with the inaugural Faddeev Medal. In 2021, he received an ERC Advanced Grant.

In 2006, Grimm became a full member of the Austrian Academy of Sciences.
