= Lithium helide =

Names
- IUPAC name Lithium Helide
- Other names Monohelidolithium

Identifiers
CAS Number	12162-15-1
3D model (JSmol)	Interactive image
PubChem CID	71355038
CompTox Dashboard (EPA)	DTXSID70779478
- InChI: InChI=1S/He.Li Key: SINKHWKNPANGEK-UHFFFAOYSA-N
- SMILES: [He].[Li]

Properties
Chemical formula	HeLi
Molar mass	10.94 g·mol^{−1}

Related compounds
Other cations	Disodium helide
- Except where otherwise noted, data are given for materials in their standard state (at 25 °C [77 °F], 100 kPa). Infobox references

Lithium helide is a compound of helium and lithium with the formula LiHe. The substance is a cold low-density gas made of Van der Waals molecules, each composed of a helium atom and lithium atom bound by van der Waals force. The preparation of LiHe opens up the possibility to prepare other helium dimers, and beyond that multi-atom clusters that could be used to investigate Efimov states and Casimir retardation effects.

== Detection ==
It was detected in 2013. Previously ^{7}Li^{4}He was predicted to have a binding energy of 0.0039 cm^{−1} (7.7×10^{−8}eV, 1.2×10^{−26}J, or 6 mK), and a bond length of 28 Å. Other van der Waals-bound helium molecules were previously known including Ag^{3}He and He_{2}. Detection of LiHe was done via fluorescence. The lithium atom in the X^{2}Σ state was excited to A^{2}Π. The spectrum showed a pair of lines, each split into two with the hyperfine structure of ^{7}Li. The lines had wavenumbers of 14902.563, 14902.591, 14902.740, and 14902.768 cm^{−1}. The two pairs are separated by 0.177 cm^{−1}. This is explained by two different vibrational states of the LiHe molecule: 1/2 and 3/2. The bonding between the atoms is so low that it cannot withstand any rotation or greater vibration without breaking apart. The lowest rotation states would have energies of 40 and 80 mK, greater than the binding energy around 6 mK.

LiHe was formed by laser ablation of lithium metal into a cryogenic helium buffer gas at a temperature between 1 and 5 K. The proportion of LiHe molecules was proportional to the density of He, and declined as the temperature increased.

== Properties ==
LiHe is polar and paramagnetic.

The average separation between the lithium and helium atoms depends on the isotope. For ^{6}LiHe the separation is 48.53 Å, but for ^{7}LiHe the distance is much smaller at 28.15 Å on average.

If the helium atom of LiHe is excited so that the 1s electron is promoted to 2s, it decays by transferring energy to ionise lithium, and the molecule breaks up. This is called interatomic Coulombic decay. The energy of the Li^{+} and He decay products is distributed in a curve that oscillates up and down about a dozen times.

== See also ==
- Helium compounds#Predicted compounds
