= Rainer Blatt =

German-Austrian experimental physicist

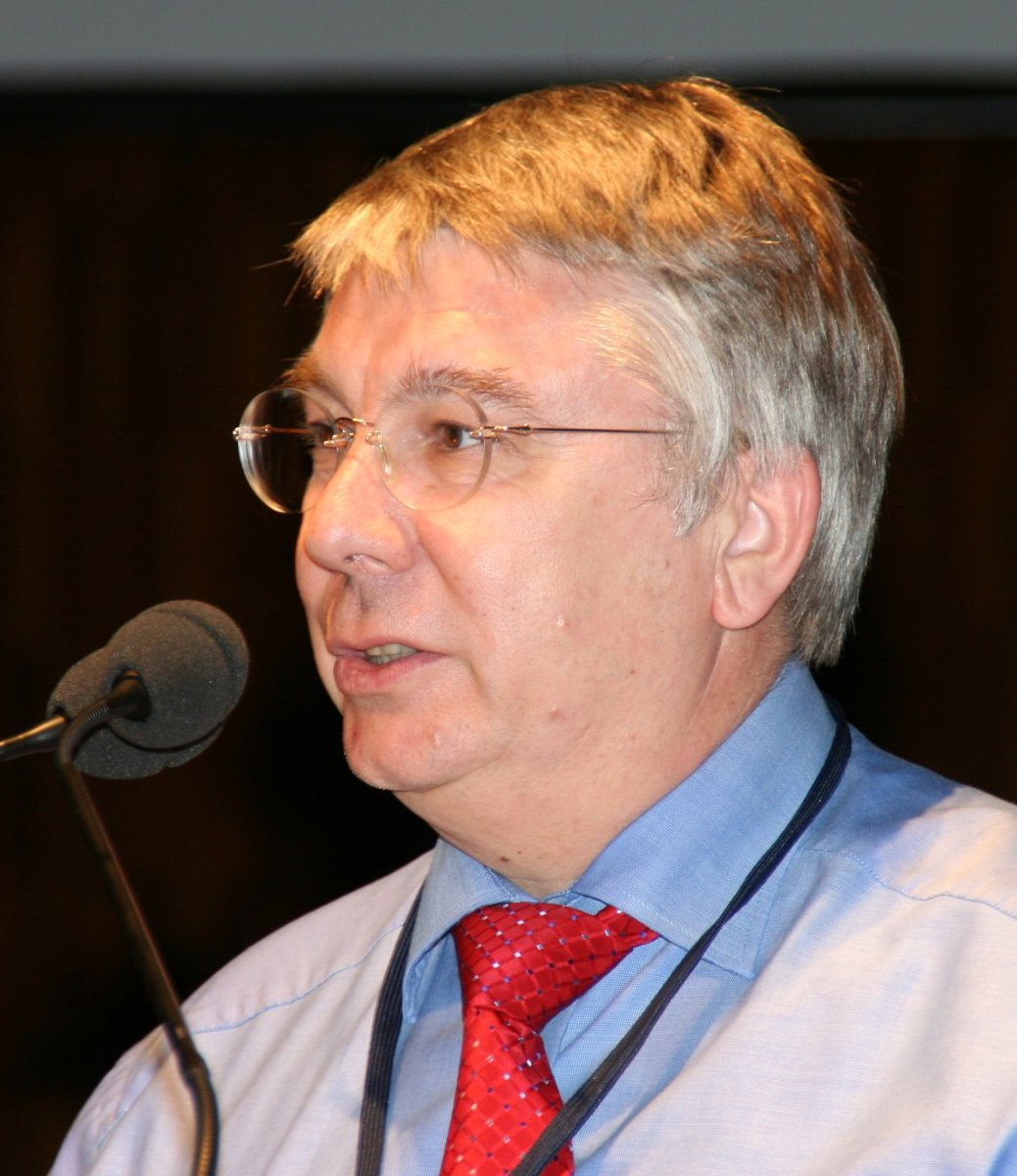
- Born: 8 September 1952 (age 73); Idar-Oberstein, Germany
- Education: University of Mainz
- Known for: Quantum optics, quantum information
- Awards: Stern-Gerlach Medal (2012), John Stewart Bell Prize (2015)
- Scientific career
- Fields: Physicist
- Workplaces: University of Innsbruck, Institute for Quantum Optics and Quantum Information

Rainer Blatt (born 8 September 1952) is a German-Austrian experimental physicist. His research centres on the areas of quantum optics and quantum information. He and his team performed one of the first experiments to teleport atoms, the other was done at NIST in Boulder Colorado. The reports of both groups appeared back-to-back in Nature.

== Early life and education ==
Blatt graduated in physics from the University of Mainz in 1979. He finished his doctorate in 1981 and worked as research assistant in the team of Günter Werth.

== Career ==
In 1982 Blatt received a research grant of the Deutsche Forschungsgemeinschaft (DFG) to go to the Joint Institute for Laboratory Astrophysics (JILA), Boulder, and work with John L. Hall (Nobel Prize winner 2005) for a year. In 1983 he went on to the Freie Universität Berlin, and in the following year joined the working group of Peter E. Toschek at the University of Hamburg. After another stay in the US, Rainer Blatt applied to qualify as a professor by receiving the “venia docendi” in experimental physics in 1988. In the period from 1989 until 1994 he worked as a Heisenberg research fellow at the University of Hamburg and returned several times to JILA in Boulder.

In 1994 Blatt was appointed to a chair in physics at the University of Göttingen and in the following year he was offered a chair in experimental physics at the University of Innsbruck. From 2000 until 2013 Blatt headed the Institute for Experimental Physics. He is a member of the academic senate. Since 2003 Blatt has also held the position of Scientific Director at the Institute for Quantum Optics and Quantum Information (IQOQI) of the Austrian Academy of Sciences (ÖAW). Blatt is a member of the council for the Lindau Nobel Laureate Meetings.

In 2018, Rainer Blatt co-founded Alpine Quantum Technologies, a quantum computing hardware company.

Blatt is married, with three children.

== Research ==
Experimental physicist Rainer Blatt has carried out trail-blazing experiments in the fields of precision spectroscopy, quantum metrology and quantum information processing. He works with atoms caught in ion traps which he manipulates using laser beams. This work is based on suggestions made in the mid-1990s by theorists Ignacio Cirac and Peter Zoller. In 2004, using their suggested set-up, Blatt’s working group, at the same time as a team at the National Institute of Standards and Technology in Boulder, Colorado, USA, succeeded for the first time in transferring the quantum information of one atom in a totally controlled manner onto another atom (teleportation). The science journal Nature reported these independently conducted experiments back-to-back and gave them pride of place on the cover. In that experiment three particles had been positioned in an ion trap. Two years later, Rainer Blatt’s working group already managed to entangle up to eight atoms in a controlled manner. Creating such a first “quantum byte” (qubyte) is a further step on the way towards a quantum computer. Blatt is also known for his support of young scientists. Six of his former assistants (Christoph Becher, Jürgen Eschner, Hartmut Häffner, Dietrich Leibfried, Piet O. Schmidt, Ferdinand Schmidt-Kaler) have since been appointed to chairs at universities abroad.

== Awards ==
Rainer Blatt was awarded the Herbert Walther Prize 2023. In 2022 he received the Austrian Cross of Honor for Science and Art 1st Class and the Gutenberg Research Award of the Gutenberg Research College of the University of Mainz. In 2020 he has been awarded an honorary doctorate from the Complutense University of Madrid. He received the Micius Quantum Prize in 2018 and was the 2015 winner of the John Stewart Bell Prize for Research on Fundamental Issues in Quantum Mechanics and their Applications. In 2014 he received the Science Award of the State of Tyrol, in 2013 an Alexander von Humboldt Research Award of the Humboldt Foundation, and in 2012 the Stern-Gerlach Medal. In 2009 he was awarded the Carl-Zeiss-Research Award and 2008 an ERC Advanced Grant by the European Research Council. He also received the Kardinal-Innitzer-Prize. In 2007 Blatt and his European project partners were nominated by the European Commission for the Descartes Prize. In 2006 he received the Erwin Schrödinger Prize of the Austrian Academy of Sciences. In 1997 he won the Innovations Award of the Tiroler Sparkasse for new ideas on quantum information processing.
Since 2008 Rainer Blatt is full member of the Austrian Academy of Sciences. He was elected a foreign associate of the US National Academy of Sciences in April 2019. In 2020 he was accepted as a foreign member of the Spanish Royal Academy of Sciences.

== Other activities ==
- Lindau Nobel Laureate Meetings, Member of the Council

== Works ==
- Rainer Blatt: Quantum information processing: Dream and Realization, in: Jürgen Audretsch (Ed.): Entangled World: The Fascination of Quantum Information and Computation. Wiley 2006 ISBN 978-3-527-40470-4
