= Disodium helide =

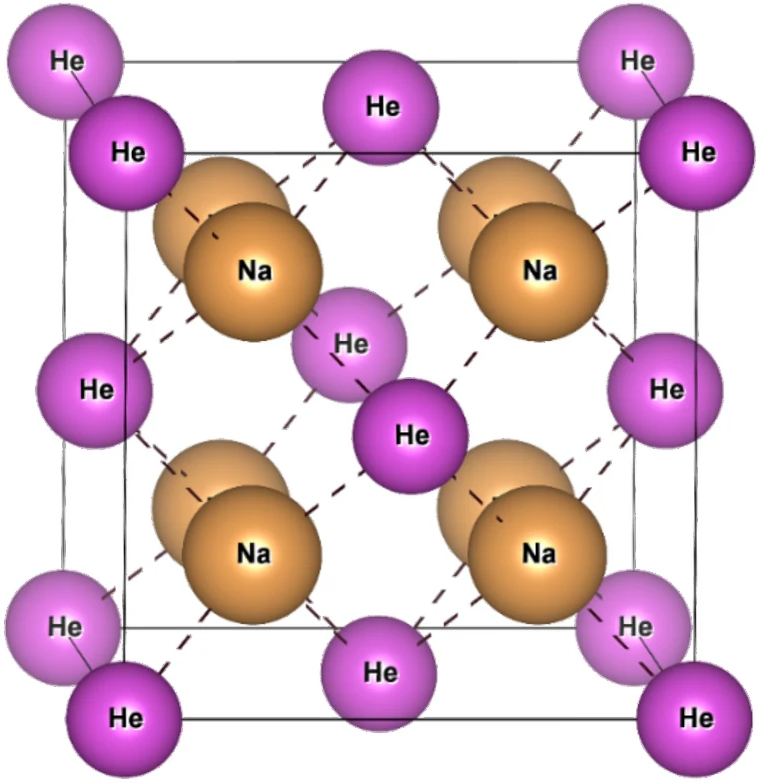

Identifiers
3D model (JSmol)	Interactive image
- InChI: InChI=1S/He.2Na Key: JTZHEFJRNNBIOK-UHFFFAOYSA-N
- SMILES: [Na].[Na].[He]

Properties
Chemical formula	Na_{2}He
Molar mass	49.982141 g·mol^{−1}

Structure
Crystal structure	Fluorite, cF12
Space group	Fm3̅m, #225
Lattice constant	a = 3.95 Å at 300 gigapascals (3,000,000 bar)

Related compounds
Other cations	Lithium helide
- Except where otherwise noted, data are given for materials in their standard state (at 25 °C [77 °F], 100 kPa). Infobox references

Disodium helide (Na_{2}He) is an electride compound of helium and sodium that is stable at high pressures above 113 GPa (1,130,000 bar). It was first predicted using the USPEX crystal structure prediction algorithm and then synthesised in 2016.

== Structure ==
Disodium helide has a cubic crystal structure, resembling that of fluorite. At 300 GPa (3,000,000 bar), the edge of a unit cell of the crystal has a = 3.95 Å.

Each unit cell contains:

- 4 neutral helium atoms He on the centre of the cube faces and corners.
- 8 sodium ions Na^{+} at coordinates halfway between the center and each corner,
- 4 spin-paired electron pairs 2e^{−} at each edge and the centre of the unit cell. (Note: Each face is shared by two cells, each edge is shared by four cells, and each corner is shared by eight cells.)

The helium atoms do not participate in any bonding. The electron pairs can be considered as an eight-centre two-electron bond.

== Synthesis ==
Na_{2}He was predicted to be thermodynamically stable over 160 gigapascals (1,600,000 bar) and dynamically stable over 100 gigapascals (1,000,000 bar). This means it should be possible to form at the higher pressure and then decompress to 100 GPa, but below that it would decompose. Compared with other binary compounds of other elements and helium, it was predicted to be stable at the lowest pressure of any such combination. This also means, for example, that a helium-potassium compound is predicted to require much higher pressures of the order of terapascals.

The material was synthesized by putting tiny plates of sodium in a diamond anvil cell along with helium at 160 megapascals (1,600 bar) and then compressing to 130 gigapascals (1,300,000 bar) and heating to 1,500 K (1,230 °C; 2,240 °F) with a laser. Disodium helide is predicted to be an insulator and transparent. At 200 gigapascals (2,000,000 bar) the sodium atoms have a Bader charge of +0.599, the helium charge is −0.174, and the two-electron spots are each near −0.511. This phase could be called disodium helium electride. Disodium helide melts at a high temperature near 1500 K, much higher than the melting point of sodium. When decompressed, it can keep its form as low as 130 gigapascals (1,300,000 bar). As pressure increases, the sodium is predicted to gain more positive charge, the helium to lose negative charge and the free electron density to increase. Energy is compensated by the relative shrinking of the helium atoms and the space for electrons.
