= Institute for Quantum Optics and Quantum Information =

Member institute of the Austrian Academy of Sciences

- IQOQI Logo

Agency overview
- Formed: 2003
- Jurisdiction: Austria
- Headquarters: Innsbruck, Austria Vienna, Austria; 48.22130°N 16.35647°E
- Agency executives: Gerhard Kirchmair, Managing Director, IQOQI Innsbruck; Markus Aspelmeyer, Executive Director, IQOQI Vienna; Birgit Weihs-Dopfer, Head of Administration, IQOQI Innsbruck; Isabel Grießhammer, Head of Administration, IQOQI Vienna
- Parent agency: Austrian Academy of Sciences
- Website: IQOQI Innsbruck; IQOQI Vienna

The Institute for Quantum Optics and Quantum Information (IQOQI; German: Institut für Quantenoptik und Quanteninformation) is a member institute of the Austrian Academy of Sciences and was founded in November 2003, to create an Austrian research center for the newly developing fields of theoretical and experimental quantum optics and quantum information.

It has two independent sites -- Innsbruck and Vienna -- with around 80 employees each. The institute is dedicated to fundamental research in quantum optics, quantum information, quantum foundations, and quantum communication, both theoretical and experimental.

The Innsbruck site has eight research teams led by Hannes Bernien, Rainer Blatt, Francesca Ferlaino, Rudolf Grimm, Klemens Hammerer, Gerhard Kirchmair, Hannes Pichler and Peter Zoller. The Vienna site has seven teams, led by Markus Aspelmeyer, Časlav Brukner, Marcus Huber, Markus Müller, Miguel Navascues, Rupert Ursin, and Anton Zeilinger, as well as the recently established YIRGs (Young Independent Researcher Groups), led by Ämin Baumeler, Costantino Budroni, and Yelena Guryanova.

The two sites are independent research centers with strong links to the University of Innsbruck and the University of Vienna. Thereby a close exchange of students and postdocs is established, and the members of the institute can be integrated into teaching at the universities.

== IQOQI-Innsbruck ==
The main research areas of IQOQI-Innsbruck include quantum computation with trapped ions and neutral atoms trapped in optical tweezers, quantum gases of strongly magnetic atoms, complex quantum many-body behavior, superconducting quantum circuits, many-body quantum optics, quantum nanophysics and quantum information processing.

IQOQI-Innsbruck is located at the Campus Technik of the University of Innsbruck in the western part of Innsbruck.

== IQOQI-Vienna ==
The main research achievements of IQOQI-Vienna include the up-to-now longest quantum teleportation (over 144 km), the highest photon angular momentum states that are entangled, the coldest temperature of a nano-mechanical resonator and the first proposal for testing general relativistic time dilation in a quantum experiment. IQOQI-Vienna is a member of the Vienna Center for Quantum Science and Technology (VCQ).

IQOQI-Vienna is located in a historical building at Boltzmanngasse 3. In May 2015, the European Physical Society has designated the building as an EPS Historic Site, among the sites that are significant to physics and its history. The building was previously the location of the Institute for Radium Research, now Stefan-Meyer-Institute for Subatomic Physics, initiated by Karl Kupelwieser and opened by Archduke Rainer of Austria.

== Research groups in Innsbruck ==
- Quantum science atom-by-atom (Hannes Bernien)
- Dipolar quantum gases (Francesca Ferlaino)
- Ultra cold atoms and quantum gases (Rudolf Grimm)
- Quantum optics and quantum metrology (Klemens Hammerer)
- Superconducting quantum circuits (Gerhard Kirchmair)
- Many-body quantum optics (Hannes Pichler)

=== Emeritus groups ===
- Quantum optics and spectroscopy (Rainer Blatt)
- Quantum optics and quantum information (Peter Zoller)

=== Former groups ===
- Quantum nanophysics, optics and information (Oriol Romero-Isart) (2013–2024)
- Quantum information (Hans J. Briegel) (2003–2014)

== Research groups in Vienna ==
- Exploring the boundaries of quantum physics and gravity in experiments (Markus Aspelmeyer)
- Quantum foundations and quantum information theory (Časlav Brukner)
- Quantum thermodynamics, quantum information and quantum metrology, theory and experiments (Marcus Huber)
- Quantum information and foundations of physics (Markus Müller)
- Foundational and theoretical aspects of quantum information (Miguel Navascués)
- Quantum information processing and communication, experiments (Rupert Ursin)
- Quantum information and foundations of physics, experiments (Anton Zeilinger)
- Young Independent Research Group (Ämin Baumeler, Costantino Budroni, and Yelena Guryanova)

- riegel)
