= Markus Aspelmeyer =

Austrian quantum physicist

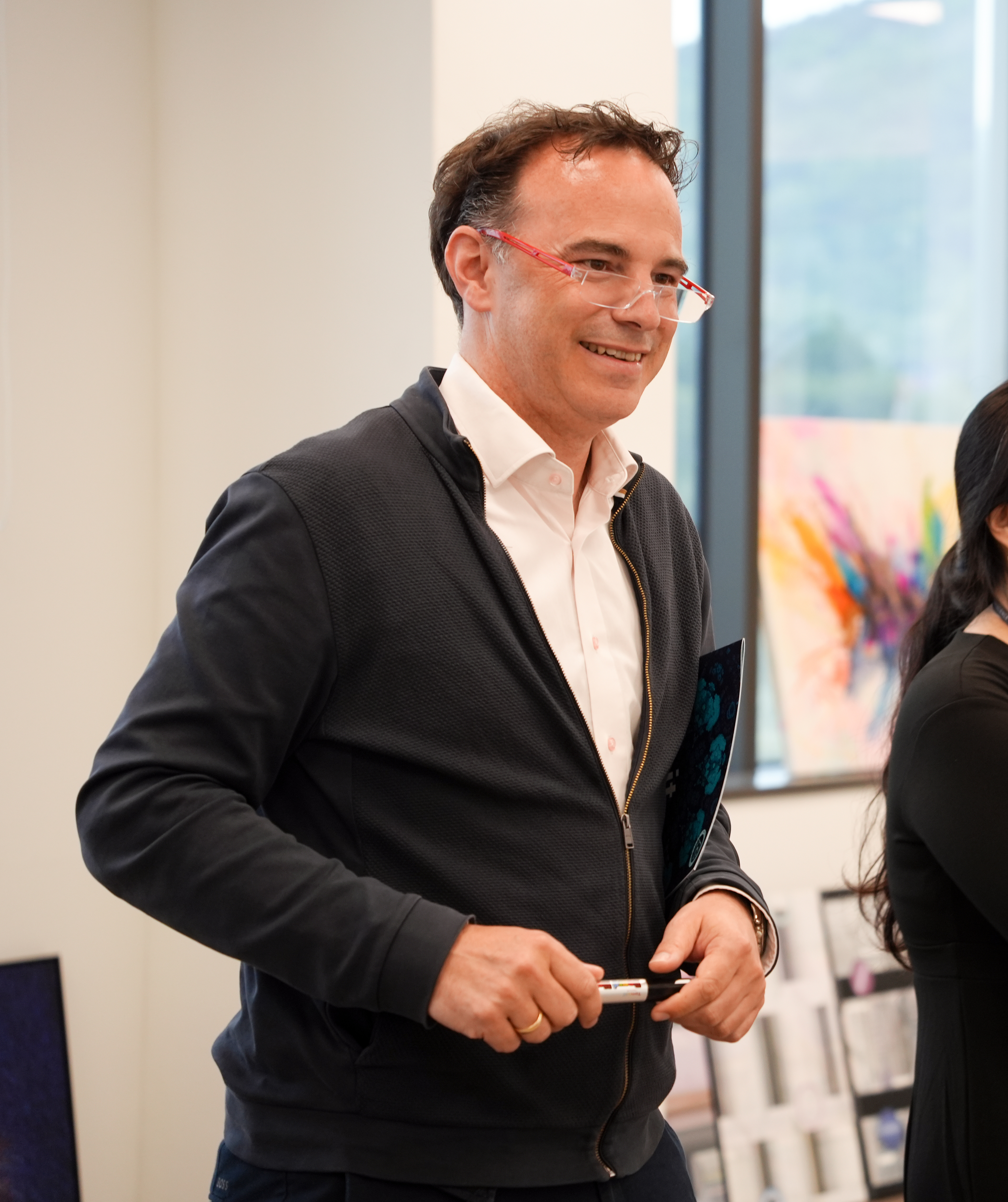
- Born: 1974 (age 51–52); Schongau, Germany
- Education: LMU Munich
- Awards: Lieben Prize (2007), ERC Starting Grant (2009)
- Scientific career
- Fields: Physicist
- Workplaces: University of Vienna; Institute for Quantum Optics and Quantum Information (IQOQI)
- Thesis: Einfluss externer Felder auf Struktur und Grenzflächenmorphologie dünner ferroelektrischer Filme (2002)
- Doctoral advisor: Johann Peisl

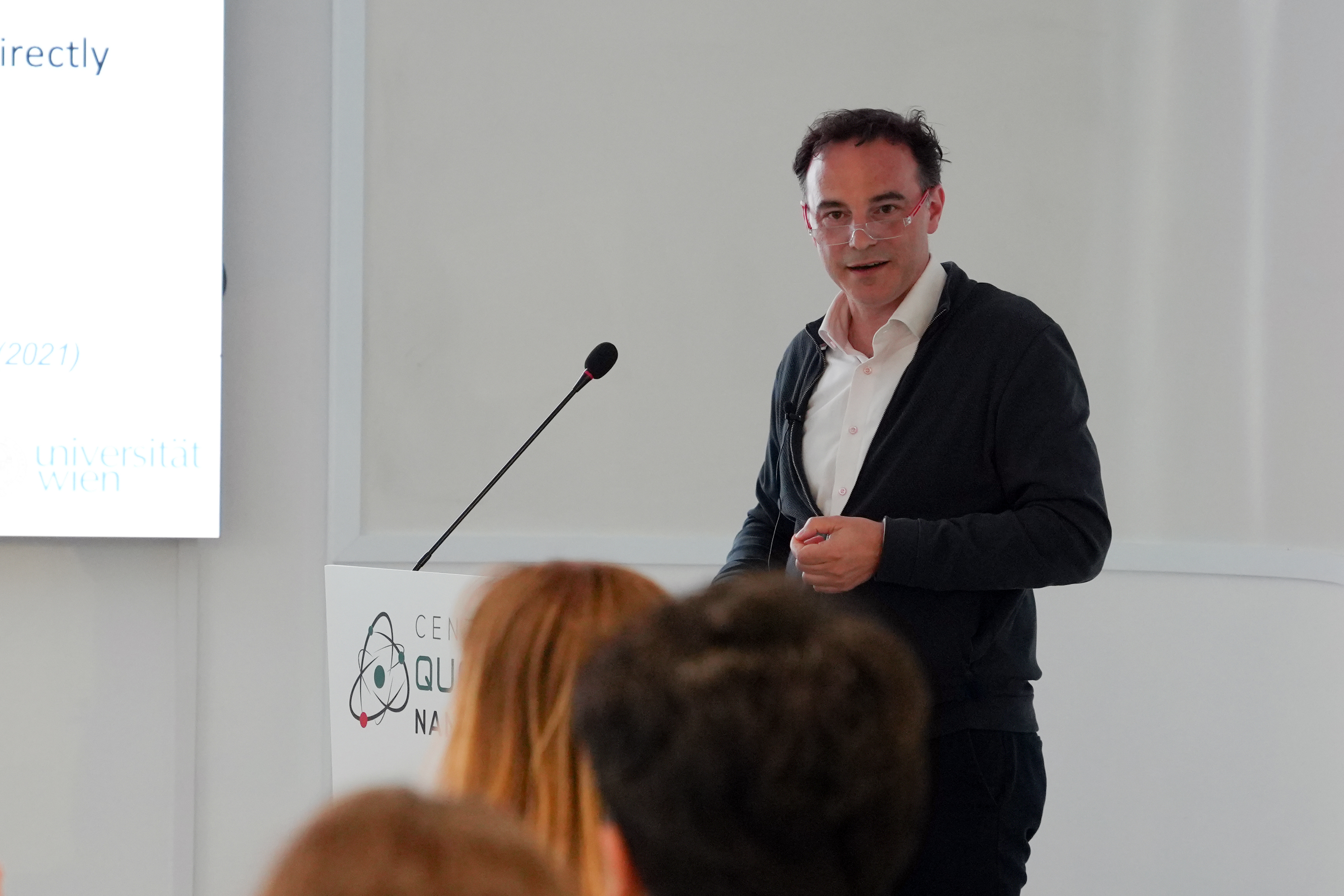
Markus Aspelmeyer giving a lecture at the Center for Quantum Nanoscience in South Korea.

Markus Aspelmeyer is an Austrian quantum physicist.

== Early life and education ==
Aspelmeyer was born 1974 in the Bavarian town Schongau. He also attended the local school, where he received his Abitur in 1993. He studied physics and philosophy at LMU Munich, receiving his BS in philosophy and his Ph.D. in physics in 2002.

== Career ==
He joined the group of Anton Zeilinger at the University of Vienna in 2002 with a Feodor Lynen PostDoctoral Fellowship of the Alexander von Humboldt Foundation. He became Universitätsassistent at the university and then, Junior, later senior researcher, at the Institute for Quantum Optics and Quantum Information (IQOQI) of the Austrian Academy of Sciences where he is leading a research team working on quantum effects in micro- and nanomechanical systems. His research interests are quantum entanglement and quantum optics.

== Awards and honors ==
He was awarded the Lieben Prize in 2007 and an ERC Starting Independent Researcher Grant in 2009. He was offered chairs at the University of Oxford, the University of Calgary and the University of Vienna and currently holds the chair for Quantum Information on the Nanoscale at the University of Vienna. For his work in quantum optics, quantum information and quantum-opto-mechanics he has received the Fresnel Prize of the European Physical Society, the Ignaz Lieben Prize of the Austrian Academy of Sciences and the Fritz-Kohlrausch Prize of the Austrian Physical Society. Together with Garrett Cole, co-founding partner of Crystalline Mirror Solutions (CMS), he received the second prize of the Berthold Leibinger Innovationspreis in 2016 for the development of substrate-transferred crystalline coatings. In December 2019 CMS was acquired by Thorlabs Inc.
