= Francesca Ferlaino =

Italian experimental physicist

- Born: 23 December 1977 (age 48); Napoli, Italy
- Known for: Quantum Phenomena in atomic gases
- Awards: Grand Prix de Physique "Cécile-DeWitt Morette/École de Physuqye des Houches" Junior Bec Award The Feltrinelli prize Erwin Schrödinger Prize Elected as a Fellow of the American Physical Society
- Scientific career
- Fields: Experimental physicist
- Institutions: University of Innbruck

Francesca Ferlaino (born 1977) is an Italian-Austrian experimental physicist known for her research on quantum matter. She is a professor of physics at the University of Innsbruck.

== Career ==
Francesca Ferlaino was born in Naples, Italy. She studied physics at the University of Naples Federico II (1995–2000) and was an undergraduate research fellow at the International School for Advanced Studies (SISSA) in Trieste (1999–2000). She did a PhD in physics at the University of Florence and the European Laboratory for Non-Linear Spectroscopy (LENS) (2001–2004). In 2007, she moved to the University of Innsbruck, Austria, where she was a research and teaching associate and started her own research group. In 2014 she became a professor of physics at the University of Innsbruck and research director at the Institute for Quantum Optics and Quantum Information (IQOQI) of the Austrian Academy of Sciences.

== Research ==
Her research activity explores quantum phenomena in atomic gases at ultralow temperatures with contributions spanning topics including quantum matter of atoms and molecules and few-body and scattering physics. Over the last years, she has focused specifically on the strongly magnetic, and rather unexplored, Erbium and Dysprosium atomic species, realizing in 2012 the world's first Bose-Einstein condensation of Erbium, and in 2018, the first dipolar quantum mixture of Erbium and Dysprosium. In 2019, she was able to prepare the first long-lived supersolid state, an elusive and paradoxical state where superfluid flow and crystal rigidity coexist. With these systems, she has explored a variety of many-body quantum phenomena dictated by the long-range and anisotropic dipolar interaction among the atoms. In 2021, she created supersolid states along two dimensions. In 2024 her team reported the observation of quantum vortices in the supersolid phase

== Awards ==
Her was awarded the Grand Prix de Physique "Cécile-DeWitt Morette/École de Physique des Houches" from the French Academy of Sciences (2019), the Junior BEC Award (2019), the Feltrinelli Prize (2017) and the Erwin Schrödinger Prize (2017). She was elected as a Fellow of the American Physical Society (APS) in 2019 "for ground-breaking experiments on dipolar quantum gases of erbium atoms, including the attainment of quantum degeneracy of bosons and fermions, studies on quantum-chaotical scattering, the formation of quantum droplets, and investigations on the roton spectrum".

She was named Austria's Scientist of the Year 2025 and Austrian of the Year 2024 in research. Since 2026, she is a full member of the Austrian Academy of Sciences.
