= Peter E. Toschek =

German physicist (1933–2020)

Peter Toschek
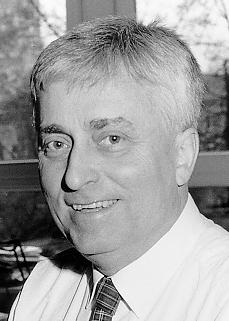
- Born: 18 April 1933; Hindenburg, Saxony, Prussia, Germany
- Died: 25 June 2020 (aged 87); Hamburg
- Education: University of Bonn; University of Göttingen
- Known for: laser spectroscopy, singular ions
- Awards: Robert Wichard Pohl Prize (1990); Herbert Walther Award (2015)
- Scientific career
- Fields: physics
- Workplaces: Heidelberg University; University of Hamburg
- Doctoral advisor: Wolfgang Paul
- Doctoral students: Theodor W. Hänsch

Peter E. Toschek (18 April 1933 – 25 June 2020) was a German experimental physicist who researched nuclear physics, quantum optics, and laser physics. He is known as a pioneer of laser spectroscopy and for the first demonstration of single trapped atoms (ions). He was a professor at Hamburg University.

== Biography ==
Toschek studied physics in Göttingen and Bonn. Supervised by Wolfgang Paul, he defended his Ph.D. thesis in 1961. The topic of his dissertation was the scattering of Gallium atoms in defined Zeeman states by Argon and Helium. In 1963, he became a research assistant at the Institute for Applied Physics at Heidelberg University. There he founded the first German research group for laser spectroscopy which was soon joined by Theodor Hänsch (doctorate 1969). Toschek completed his habilitation in experimental physics in 1968. In 1972, he became a Professor at Heidelberg. In 1981, he accepted a chair in experimental physics at the University of Hamburg. There he and Günter Huber founded the Institute for Laser Physics in 1989. From 1980 to 1990, Toschek co-edited Optics Communications. Peter Toschek worked at Stanford University with Tony Siegman (1972), at the Laboratoire Aimé Cotton in Orsay, France, (1978/79), and as a Fellow of the Joint Institute for Laboratory Astrophysics (JILA) in Boulder, Colorado (1986/87). He retired in 1998, but continued to be a scientifically active part of the Institute for Laser Physics.

== Research ==
Since the 1960s, Peter Toschek and his associates developed new methods of laser spectroscopy like Doppler-free saturation spectroscopy as well as the extremely sensitive intra-cavity absorption spectroscopy (ICAS). They observed non-linear interactions of light with atoms like self-induced transparency of an absorber, and like the generation of singular optical oscillations (solitons). In 1978, Toschek‘s research group was the first to demonstrate the cooling of atoms by laser light, just before David Wineland and co-workers. After Peter Toschek and Hans Georg Dehmelt having proposed, in 1975, a scheme for the realization and observation of single atomic ions, Werner Neuhauser, Martin Hohenstatt and Peter Toschek demonstrated in 1978, for the first time, the trapping and visual observation of a single atom, a Barium ion, which had been cooled by laser light down to a few mK above absolute zero temperature, and confined within a miniature quadrupole ion trap. This achievement made feasible the manipulation, quantum measurement and spectroscopy of individual atomic ions. On such quantum objects Toschek and associates observed for the first time and reported in 1986 Niels Bohr's metaphorical "quantum jumps", simultaneously with and independent of similar observations by Hans Georg Dehmelt and co-workers. Other achievements include the first demonstration of a two-photon laser (1981), the quenching of quantum noise (in the difference frequency signal of two laser emission lines) by correlated spontaneous emission (1990), stochastic cooling of single ions (1995), the observation of the oscillation dynamics of trapped ions (1998), atomic interferometry on a single ion (1999) and unambiguous evidence of impeded evolution of an unstable quantum system by the system's observation, the Quantum Zeno effect (2000).

Toschek’s former students or associates include Bernd Appasamy, Valery Baev, Rainer Blatt, Klaus-Jochen Boller, Philippe Courteille, Jürgen Eschner, Theodor Hänsch, Werner Neuhauser, Ingo Siemers, Ingo Steiner, and Zhang Dao-Zhong.

== Awards ==
In 1990 Peter Toschek received the Robert Wichard Pohl Prize of the German Physical Society (DPG). He has been a member of the Academy of Sciences and Humanities in Hamburg since 1994. In 2002, Toschek became a Fellow of the Optical Society of America (OSA). In 2015 he received the Herbert Walther Award, jointly awarded by DPG and OSA.

== Works ==
- With Werner Neuhauser: Einzelne Ionen für die dopplerfreie Spektroskopie. In: Physikalische Blätter 36, Nr. 7, 1980, S. 198–202, doi:10.1002/phbl.19800360714.
- Das Einzelion — Quantenpräparat und Idealuhr. In: Physikalische Blätter 46, Nr. 7, 1990, S. 213–219, doi:10.1002/phbl.19900460706.
- Was enthüllt ein beobachtetes Atom seinem Beobachter? Berichte aus den Sitzungen der Joachim Jungius-Gesellschaft der Wissenschaften e.V., Hamburg, Jahrgang 23 (2005), Heft 1. Vandenhoeck & Ruprecht, Göttingen 2005, ISBN 3-525-86329-2
