= Časlav Brukner =

Serbian-Austrian quantum physicist

Časlav Brukner (born July 9, 1967 in Novi Sad, Serbia, Yugoslavia) is a Serbian-Austrian quantum physicist and university professor.

== Biography ==
Brukner studied physics at the University of Belgrade from 1987 to 1991, and subsequently completed a degree in physics at the University of Vienna in 1995. He then worked as a research assistant at the Institute for Experimental Physics at the University of Innsbruck. In 1999 he received his doctorate in quantum physics at the Vienna University of Technology under the supervision of Anton Zeilinger.

In 2003, he completed his habilitation in the field of quantum physics at the University of Vienna, where he was an associate professor until 2014. He has had several research experiences abroad: in 2004 at Imperial College in London, and from 2005 to 2008 as professor at the Tsinghua University in Beijing. Since 2008 he has been guest professor at the University of Belgrade.

Between July 2013 and June 2019 he has been Director of the Institute for Quantum Optics and Quantum Information (IQOQI) Vienna at the Austrian Academy of Sciences and since February 2014 he has the Chair of Quantum Information Theory and Fundamentals of Quantum Physics in the group Quantum Optics, Quantum Nanophysics and Quantum Information at the University of Vienna.

His research interests are in quantum information theory, quantum non-locality and theoretical quantum foundations, as well as causality in gravitation and quantum physics.

In 2021, he was elected a member of Serbian Academy of Science and Art (SANU).
