= Hannes Pichler (physicist) =

Physicist

Hannes Pichler (born 1986 in Brixen, Italy) is a physicist who works on theoretical quantum information science. He is a professor of theoretical physics at the University of Innsbruck, Austria.

== Biography ==
Pichler studied physics at the University of Innsbruck, where he earned his doctorate in the research group of Peter Zoller. From 2016 he was an ITAMP Postdoctoral Fellow at Harvard University and from 2019 a Gordon and Betty Moore Postdoctoral Fellow at the California Institute of Technology. Currently he is professor of theoretical physics at the University of Innsbruck and scientific director of the Institute for Quantum Optics and Quantum Information (IQOQI) in Innsbruck.

In 2022 he received an ERC Starting Grant from the European Research Council for his theoretical research on quantum many-body physics and quantum information processing. For 2023 he was awarded the New Horizons in Physics Prize "for the development of optical traps for neutral atoms and their application to quantum information processing, metrology and molecular physics".

In 2023, 2024 and 2025 he was listed among the Highly Cited Researchers in physics.

== Awards ==
- 2022: Starting Grant of the European Research Council (ERC)
- 2023: New Horizons in Physics Prize
- 2023: Hans and Walter Thirring Prize of the Austrian Academy of Sciences
- 2023: Member of the Young Academy of the Austrian Academy of Sciences
- 2024: Research Prize of the Stiftung Südtiroler Sparkasse
- 2024: Lieben Prize of the Austrian Academy of Sciences
