= Ursins (disambiguation) =

Ursins is a municipality in Switzerland. Ursins may also refer to:

== People ==
- Guillaume Jouvenel des Ursins (1400–1472), Chancellor of France
- Jean Juvénal des Ursins (1388–1473), French bishop
- Louis-Auguste Juvénal des Ursins d'Harville (1749–1815), French military officer
- Marie Anne de La Trémoille, princesse des Ursins (1642–1722), French courtier
- Marie Félicie des Ursins (1600–1666), Italian noble

== Other uses ==
- Valeyres-sous-Ursins, municipality in Switzerland
