= Vitaly Efimov =

Soviet physicist

- Виталий Ефимов
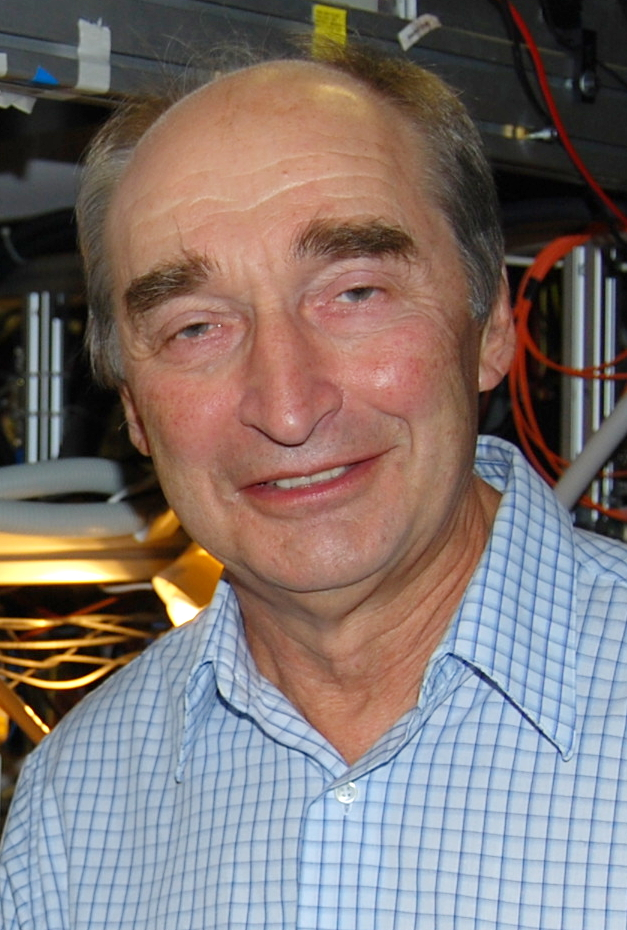
- Efimov in 2009
- Born: 1938 (age 87–88); Leningrad, Soviet Union
- Education: Ioffe Institute
- Known for: Efimov State
- Awards: Faddeev Medal (2018)
- Scientific career
- Workplaces: USSR Academy of Sciences; University of Washington
- Thesis: (1966)
- Doctoral advisor: Miron Ya. Amusia; Lev A. Sliv

Vitaly N. Efimov (Russian: Вита́лий Никола́евич Ефи́мов; born 1938) is a Soviet theoretical physicist. He proposed the existence of a novel and exotic state of matter now dubbed the Efimov State as a researcher in A. F. Ioffe Physico-Technical Institute, USSR Academy of Sciences, Leningrad, USSR in his 1970 paper "Energy levels arising from resonant two-body forces in a three-body system". It was announced in 2006 that the existence of this state of matter had been confirmed.

Formerly an affiliate professor of physics at the University of Washington, he is now a lecturer emeritus.

In 2018, he has been selected as the winner of the Inaugural Fadeev Medal.
