= Van der Waals molecule =

Weakly bound complex of atoms or molecules

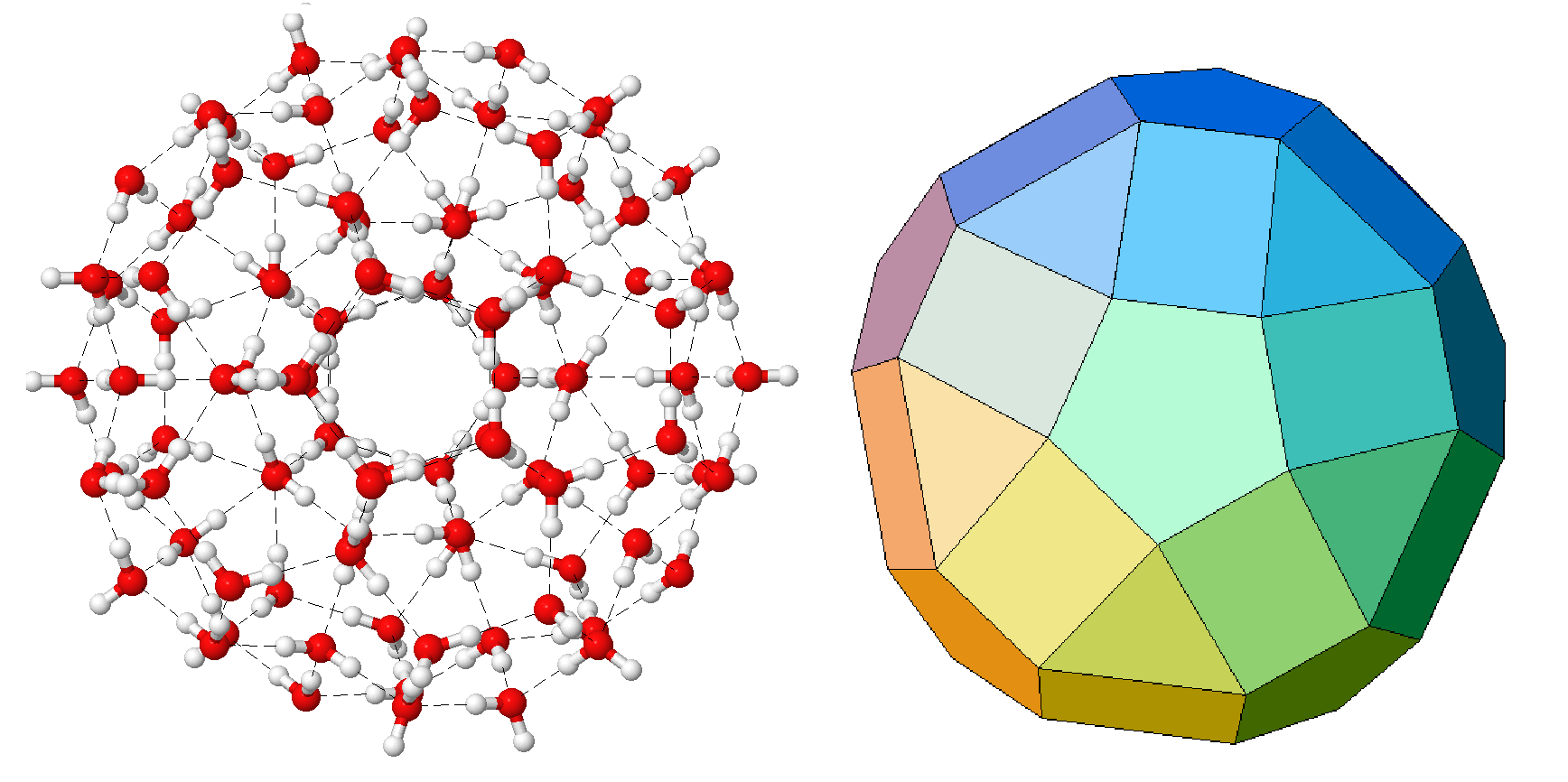
Calculated structure of a (H_{2}O)_{100} icosahedral water cluster.

A van der Waals molecule is a weakly bound complex of atoms or molecules held together by intermolecular attractions such as van der Waals forces or by hydrogen bonds. The name originated in the beginning of the 1970s when stable molecular clusters were regularly observed in molecular beam microwave spectroscopy.

== Examples ==
Examples of well-studied van der Waals molecules are Ar_{2}, H_{2}-Ar, H_{2}O-Ar, benzene-Ar, (H_{2}O)_{2}, and (HF)_{2}. Others include the largest diatomic molecule, He_{2}, and LiHe.

A notable example is the He-HCN complex, studied for its large amplitude motions and the applicability of the adiabatic approximation in separating its angular and radial motions. Research has shown that even in such 'floppy' systems, the adiabatic approximation can be effectively utilized to simplify quantum mechanical analyses.

== Supersonic beam spectroscopy ==
In (supersonic) molecular beams, temperatures are very low (usually less than 5 K). At these low temperatures, van der Waals (vdW) molecules are stable and can be investigated by microwave, far-infrared spectroscopy and other modes of spectroscopy. Also, in cold equilibrium gases, vdW molecules are formed, albeit in small, temperature dependent concentrations. Rotational and vibrational transitions in vdW molecules have been observed in gases, mainly by UV and IR spectroscopy.

Because Van der Waals molecules are usually very non-rigid, with many different versions separated by low energy barriers, relatively large level-splittings of their tunneling barriers are observable in the far-infrared. In this far-infrared spectral region, many of the very numerous intermolecular vibrations, rotations and tunneling motions of these weakly-interacting moieties can be resolved. Such Vibrational-Rotational-Tunneling ("VRT") spectroscopic study of van der Waals molecules is one of the most direct routes to the understanding of intermolecular forces.

In study of helium-containing van der Waals complexes, the adiabatic approximation or Born–Oppenheimer approximation has been adapted to separate angular and radial motions. Despite the challenges posed by the weak interactions leading to large amplitude motions, research demonstrates that this approximation can still be valid, offering a quicker computational method for Diffusion Monte Carlo studies of molecular rotation within ultra-cold helium droplets. The non-rigid nature of these complexes, especially those with helium, complicates traditional quantum mechanical approaches. However, recent studies have validated the use of the adiabatic approximation for separating different types of molecular motion, even in these 'floppy' systems.

== See also ==
- Van der Waals radius
- Van der Waals strain
- Van der Waals surface
- Category:Van der Waals molecules (articles about specific chemicals)
