= Chibaite =

Rare silicate mineral

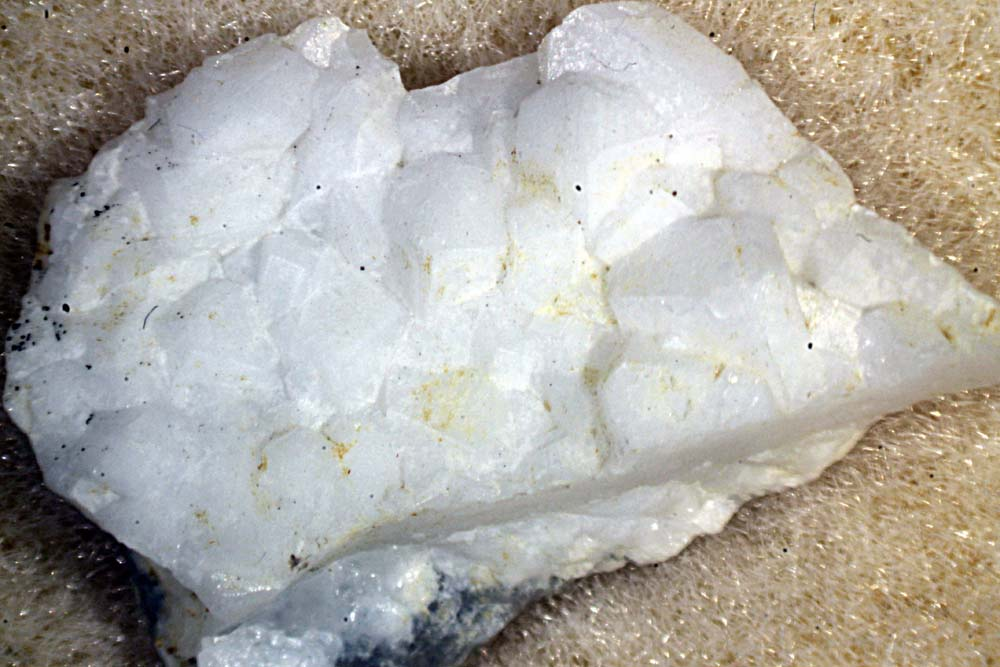
- White crystals of the rare silica-hydrocarbon minerals chibaite (IMA 2008-067) and bosoite (IMA 2014-023) from the type and only known locality worldwide for both species: Arakawa, Minamiboso City, Chiba Prefecture, Honshu Island, Japan.

General
- Category: Minerals
- Formula: SiO_{2}•n(CH_{4}, C_{2}H_{6}, C_{3}H_{8}, i-C_{4}H_{10}) (n ≤ 3/17)
- IMA symbol: Cib
- Strunz classification: 4.DA
- Crystal system: Isometric
- Space group: F2/d3̅
- Unit cell: a = 19.3742 V=7,272.29 Å^{3}

Identification
- Colour: white
- Mohs scale hardness: 7
- Luster: Vitreous
- Specific gravity: 1.933
- Optical properties: isotropic
- Refractive index: 1.470

Chibaite is a rare silicate mineral. It is a silica clathrate with formula SiO_{2}•n(CH_{4},C_{2}H_{6},C_{3}H_{8},i-C_{4}H_{10}) (n = 3/17 (max)). The mineral is cubic (diploidal class, m3̅) and the silica hosts or traps various hydrocarbon molecules, such as methane, ethane, propane and isobutane.

Chibaite was first described for specimens collected from Arakawa, Minamibōsō, Chiba Prefecture, Honshu Island, Japan. The mineral was approved by the IMA in 2009.
