= Rupert Ursin =

Austrian experimental physicist (born 1973)

Rupert Ursin (born January 26, 1973) is an Austrian experimental physicist active in the field of quantum entanglement and communications. He founded several companies, e.g. Quantum Technology Laboratories GmbH. and Quantum Industries GmbH and acts currently as CEO in both of theses companies.

== Education ==
Ursin completed his Masters diploma in 2001, then in December 2006 completed a PhD dissertation at University of Vienna on quantum teleportation over long distances under the guidance of Anton Zeilinger. He continued with postdoctoral studies in 2007, and since 2013 has served as a research group leader and Deputy Director at the IQOQI.

== Research ==
Ursin's research group is active in the field of quantum entanglement and communications. In particular, the team demonstrated an example of loophole-free Bell inequality and worked on quantum key distribution.

In 2004, Ursin and colleagues from the Institute for Experimental Physics at the University of Vienna succeeded in the world's-first demonstration of quantum teleportation of a photon outside of the laboratory, sending it a distance of 600 meters across the River Danube.

In 2007, Ursin's group succeeded in distributing entangled photons between the Canary Islands La Palma and Tenerife over a world-record distance of 144 km.

In 2016, Ursin's group successfully tested entanglement in accelerated reference frames. and in a Zero-G flight.

== Awards ==
- 2009 Christian-Doppler-Prize
- 2023 Gründungspreis Phönix

== Bibliography ==
- Fink, M. et al. Experimental test of photonic entanglement in accelerated reference frames. Nat. Comm. 8, 15304 doi: 10.1038/ncomms15304 (2017).
- Rupert Ursin et al.: Quantum Teleportation across the Danube, Nature, 430, 849 (2004).
- Rupert Ursin et al.: Entanglement-based quantum communication over 144 km, Nature Physics 3, 481 - 486 (2007)
