= Helium trimer =

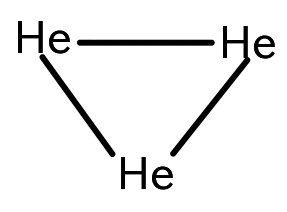

Names
- Other names trihelium

Identifiers
CAS Number	12596-21-3
3D model (JSmol)	Interactive image
PubChem CID	18688918
- InChI: InChI=1S/3He Key: YFGIFVWZKVYMFI-UHFFFAOYSA-N
- SMILES: [He].[He].[He]

Properties
Chemical formula	He_{3}
Molar mass	12.007806 g·mol^{−1}
- Except where otherwise noted, data are given for materials in their standard state (at 25 °C [77 °F], 100 kPa). Infobox references

The helium trimer (or trihelium) is a weakly bound molecule consisting of three helium atoms. Van der Waals forces link the atoms together. The combination of three atoms is much more stable than the two-atom helium dimer. The three-atom combination of helium-4 atoms is an Efimov state. Helium-3 is predicted to form a trimer, although ground state dimers containing helium-3 are completely unstable.

Helium trimer molecules have been produced by expanding cold helium gas from a nozzle into a vacuum chamber. Such a set up also produces the helium dimer and other helium atom clusters. The existence of the molecule was proven by matter wave diffraction through a diffraction grating. Properties of the molecules can be discovered by Coulomb explosion imaging. In this process, a laser ionizes all three atoms simultaneously, which then fly away from each other due to electrostatic repulsion and are detected.

The helium trimer is large, being more than 100 Å, which is even larger than the helium dimer. The atoms are not arranged in an equilateral triangle, but instead form random shaped triangles.

Interatomic Coulombic decay can occur when one atom is ionised and excited. It can transfer energy to another atom in the trimer, even though they are separated. However this is much more likely to occur when the atoms are close together, and so the interatomic distances measured by this vary with half full height from 3.3 to 12 Å. The predicted mean distance for Interatomic Coulombic decay in ^{4}He_{3} is 10.4 Å. For ^{3}He^{4}He_{2} this distance is even larger at 20.5 Å.

== Extra reading ==
- Suno, Hiroya (14 January 2016). "Geometrical structure of helium triatomic systems: comparison with the neon trimer". Journal of Physics B: Atomic, Molecular and Optical Physics. 49 (1) 014003. Bibcode:2016JPhB...49a4003S. doi:10.1088/0953-4075/49/1/014003. S2CID 124846893.
