= Efimov state =

Physical effect in few-body systems

The Efimov effect is an effect in the quantum mechanics of few-body systems predicted by the Soviet theoretical physicist V. N. Efimov in 1970. Efimov's effect is where three identical bosons interact, with the prediction of an infinite series of excited three-body energy levels when a two-body state is exactly at the dissociation threshold. One corollary is that there exist bound states (called Efimov states) of three bosons even if the two-particle attraction is too weak to allow two bosons to form a pair. A (three-particle) Efimov state, where the (two-body) sub-systems are unbound, is often depicted symbolically by the Borromean rings. This means that if one of the particles is removed, the remaining two fall apart. In this case, the Efimov state is also called a Borromean state.

== Theory ==
A computer depiction of the quantum effect predicted by Efimov, said to resemble "Russian nesting dolls".

Pair interactions among three identical bosons will approach resonance as the binding energy of some two-body bound state approaches zero, or equivalently, the s-wave scattering length of the state becomes infinite. In this limit, Efimov predicted that the three-body spectrum exhibits an infinite sequence of bound states $N=0,1,2,\ldots$ whose scattering lengths $a_{N}$ and binding energies $E_N$ each form a geometric progression

$$\begin{align}
a_{N}&=a_0\lambda^N\\
E_{N}&=E_0\lambda^{-2N}
\end{align}$$

where the common ratio

$$\lambda=\mathrm{e}^{\mathrm{\pi}/s_0}=22.69438\ldots$$

is a universal constant (OEIS: A242978).

Here

$$s_0=1.0062378\ldots$$

is the order of the imaginary-order modified Bessel function of the second kind $\tilde{K}_{s_0}(r/a)$ that describes the radial dependence of the wavefunction. By virtue of the resonance-determined boundary conditions, this is the unique positive value of $s$ satisfying the transcendental equation

$$-s\cosh\left.\tfrac{\mathrm{\pi}s}{2}\right.+\tfrac{8}{\sqrt{3}}\sinh\left.\tfrac{\mathrm{\pi}s}{6}\right.=0.$$

The geometric progression of the energy levels of Efimov states is an example of a emergent discrete scaling symmetry. This phenomenon, exhibiting a renormalization group limit cycle, is closely related to the scale invariance of the $1/r^2$ form of the quantum mechanical potential of the system.

The result above is obtained in the so-called zero-range limit of the two-body interaction, where the range is of the interaction is taken to zero while the scattering length is kept constant. An artifact of this zero-range limit is seen in the fact that the scale invariant Efimov spectrum possesses bound states with infinite binding energy. In other words, the zero-range Efimov spectrum does not have a well defined ground state, a manifestation of a more general phenomenon in three-body quantum systems known as the Thomas collapse. In a more realistic model of the two-body interaction, with a non-zero interaction range, the scaling symmetry will be broken by a lowest Efimov state with an energy $E_*$, with an associated length scale known as the three-body parameter. For such finite range potentials, the Efimov scaling as set by $s_0$ is only valid for very weakly bound three-body states where $E_N \rightarrow 0$. For low-lying states, such as the ground state and first excited state, the scaling is broken by finite range corrections.

== Experimental results ==
In 2005, the research group of Rudolf Grimm and Hanns-Christoph Nägerl at the Institute for Experimental Physics at the University of Innsbruck experimentally confirmed the existence of such a state for the first time in an ultracold gas of caesium atoms. In 2006, they published their findings in the scientific journal Nature. Further experimental support for the existence of the Efimov state has been given recently by independent groups. Almost 40 years after Efimov's purely theoretical prediction, the characteristic periodic behavior of the states has been confirmed.

The most accurate experimental value of the scaling factor of the states has been determined by the experimental group of Rudolf Grimm at Innsbruck University as

$$\lambda=21.0\pm1.3$$

Interest in the "universal phenomena" of cold atomic gases is still growing. The discipline of universality in cold atomic gases near the Efimov states is sometimes referred to as "Efimov physics".

The experimental groups of Cheng Chin of the University of Chicago and Matthias Weidemüller of the University of Heidelberg have observed Efimov states in an ultracold mixture of lithium and caesium atoms, extending Efimov's original picture of three identical bosons.

An Efimov state existing as an excited state of a helium trimer was observed in an experiment in 2015.

== Usage ==
The Efimov states are independent of the underlying physical interaction and can in principle be observed in all quantum mechanical systems (i.e. molecular, atomic, and nuclear). The states are very special because of their "non-classical" nature: The size of each three-particle Efimov state is much larger than the force-range between the individual particle pairs. This means that the state is purely quantum mechanical. Similar phenomena are observed in two-neutron halo-nuclei, such as lithium-11; these are called Borromean nuclei. (Halo nuclei could be seen as special Efimov states, depending on the subtle definitions.)

== See also ==
- Three-body force
