= Professor of Genetics, University of Oxford =

Professorship at the University of Oxford

The Professorship of Genetics at the University of Oxford is a professorship that is attached to a fellowship at Keble College, Oxford. It was established in 1969 to address the relative lack of genetics available to undergraduate students at the university and has contributed to the development of genetics as an academic discipline there. The decision to create the position came at a time when notable geneticists at the university – the ecological geneticist Edmund Brisco Ford and the Sherardian Professor of Botany Cyril Darlington – had retired or were about to retire. The university created a lecturer and a demonstrator post in the discipline at the same time.

Support came from three departments - the Department of Zoology (now Department of Biology), the Department of Biochemistry, and Botany (now Department of Biology) - in a collaborative initiative led by John Pringle, the Linacre Professor of Zoology. Rodney Porter had just been appointed as the new Whitley Professor of Biochemistry and Cyril Darlington was Professor of Botany. Space for the new Genetics Laboratory was allocated in the old Physiology building

It might have been expected that the first Professor of Genetics would be an ecological geneticist, replacing Ford's expertise. But instead, a human geneticist, Walter Bodmer, who was working in areas including the HLA system (encoding the major histocompatibility complex proteins) and human somatic cell genetics, was chosen. Sir Walter was at the time a professor at Stanford University and had previously studied at the University of Cambridge. He moved to Oxford in 1970 and was asked to decide which department genetics should be allied with - Zoology, Botany or Biochemistry. For Sir Walter, the obvious choice was the Department of Biochemistry since his work was increasingly moving towards that discipline.

Sir Walter and his group settled in the Genetics Laboratory, which would later become the Walter Bodmer Building (now demolished). He and his colleagues taught a single introductory genetics course to students across all departments, from medical students to biochemists and biologists. His was the only major genetics group at the university during the early 1970s, and he remained in post until 1979 when he moved to become director of research at the Imperial Cancer Research Fund (now part of Cancer Research UK) in London.

Since the creation of the chair, genetics has expanded and diversified across the University of Oxford with the arrival of David Weatherall, Kay Davies, Peter Donnelly and many others. It is no longer a sub-department within the Department of Biochemistry.

The Professor of Genetics chair has been held by:

- Sir Walter Bodmer (1970-1979)
- John H. Edwards (1979-1995)
- Kay Davies (1995-1998)
- Jonathan Hodgkin (2000-2016)
- Rob Klose (2017- )
