= Ronald Whittam =

English physiologist (1925–2023)

Ronald Whittam FRS
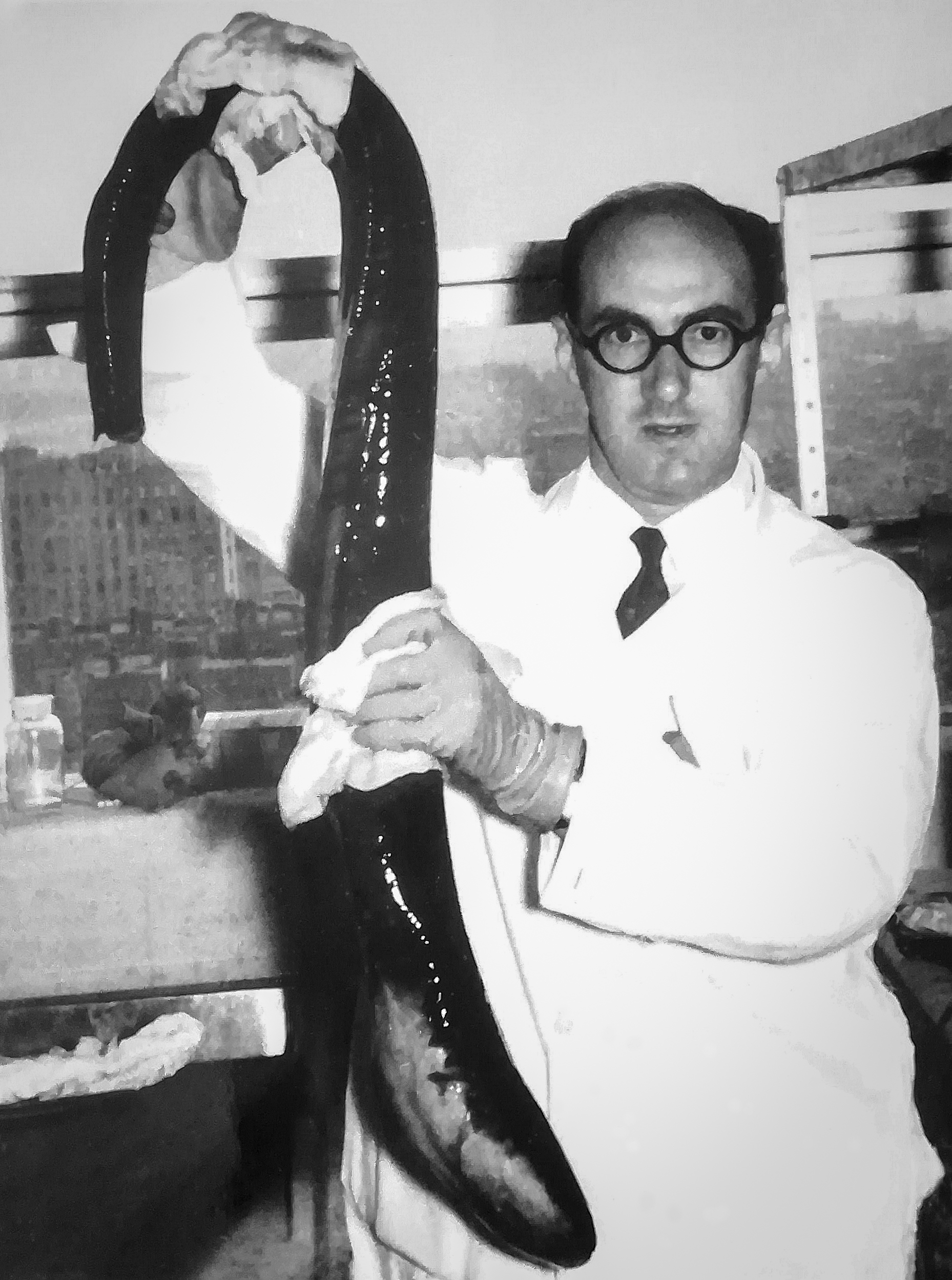
- Born: 21 March 1925; Chadderton, Lancashire, England
- Died: 16 August 2023 (aged 98); Leicester, England
- Education: Oldham College
- Alma mater: University of Manchester
- Known for: Active transport of ions
- Spouse: Christine Patricia Margaret Lamb (m. 1957)
- Children: 2
- Awards: Fellow of the Royal Society (1973)
- Scientific career
- Fields: Physiology
- Workplaces: University of Cambridge; University of Oxford; University of Sheffield; University of Leicester
- Doctoral advisor: Hans Krebs; Richard Keynes
- Ronald Whittam's voice Recorded January 1962

Ronald Whittam FRS (21 March 1925 – 16 August 2023) was an English research scientist in the field of cell physiology. He conducted important studies on the mechanism of active transport of ions across animal membranes and its relation to cellular metabolism. Whittam was the inaugural Chair in Physiology at the University of Leicester, where he was subsequently an Emeritus Professor.

== Early life and education ==
Ronald Whittam was born in Chadderton, within the Metropolitan Borough of Oldham, Lancashire, on 21 March 1925. He is the eldest of three sons and one daughter of Edward Whittam and May Whittam. His parents owned a bakery business in Butler Green, Chadderton. He left school at the age of 14 to work in the family business. He voluntarily attended educational evening classes and at the age of 16 had day release to the Municipal Technical College, Oldham. He achieved the School Certificate.

Whittam reached the age of 18 during World War II in 1943 and joined the Royal Air Force. He was selected to join the PNB scheme: pilot, navigator, bomb-aimer. He passed the PNB scheme, in 50 Initial Training Wing at RAF Bridgnorth, Shropshire. In 1947 he was demobbed from National Service, then commenced university life.

Whittam received his BSc degree in Chemistry, at the University of Manchester in 1951. His tutor was Thomas K. Walker who by then had finished working with Chaim Weizmann in the University. He gained an early insight for research with Professor Herbert Stanley Raper and Alfred Alexander Harper.

Whittam founded the Labour Student Club in the Faculty at the University of Manchester and was a member of the executive of the newly formed National Association of Labour Students Organisations, along with Fred Jarvis, Dick Mabon and Bill Wedderburn.

== Career and research ==
In 1951 Whittam was selected by Professor Sir Hans Krebs to conduct research in the Medical Research Council unit - Department of Biochemistry, University of Sheffield. He resided in Stephenson Hall where he met another biochemist: Gregorio Weber. He received a PhD. His external examiner was Professor Sir Alan Hodgkin. He continued research upon being awarded a John Stokes Fellowship till 1955. He published several papers, including with Bob Davies, Hans Breuer, Professor Sir Hans Krebs and Reg Hems.

Later in 1955, Whittam became a Beit Memorial Fellow at the University of Cambridge in the Department of Physiology. He conducted research there and was among eminent physiologist in the department, including Lord Edgar Adrian, Professor Sir Alan Hodgkin, Professor Sir Bryan Matthews, Joseph Needham and Gilbert Adair. Whittam and Matthews were both members of Kings’ College. His Doctoral advisor was Richard Keynes. He was awarded another PhD. Whittam's research was on electrolyte and water in relation to metabolism; oxidative phosphorylation; the relationship between ion transporting water and respiration and glycolysis. He worked with Daniel C. Tosteson whereby they discovered the making of red cell ghosts.

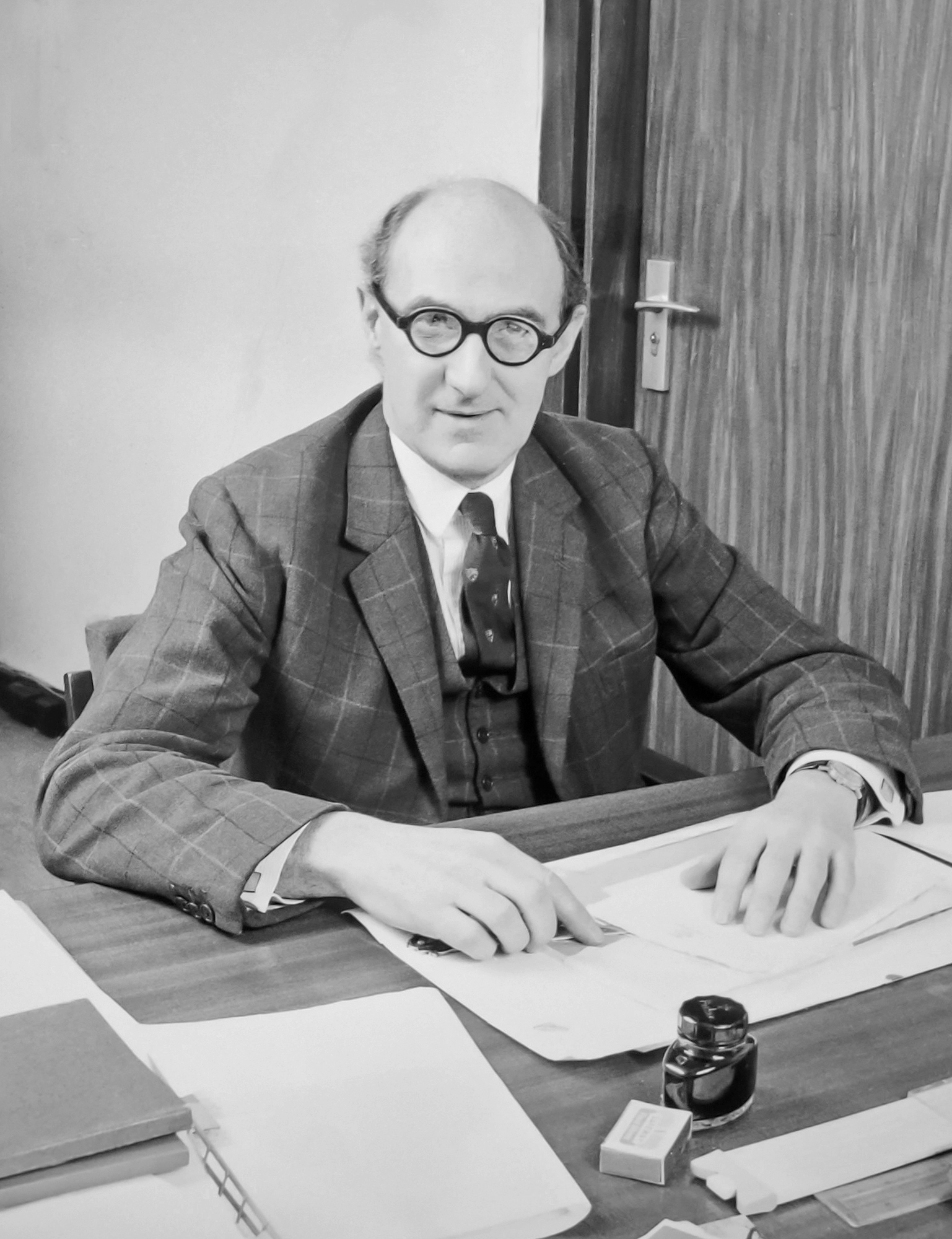
Ronald Whittam in his office

From 1958 to 1966, Whittam was at the University of Oxford. During that time, he was again in the same department of Sir Hans Krebs who was Whitley Professor of Biochemistry. He was awarded a M.A. at the University of Oxford. In the first two years he conducted research as scientific research staff of the Medical Research Unit. Whittam proved the pacemaker effect of the sodium pump on metabolism with red blood cells. He spent over half of 1958 at Columbia University, New York, working with David Nachmansohn on electrophysiology with single cell electroplaques and the electric eel. Whittam discovered how much potassium is released from a cell of a mammalian. In 1960 he became a Lecturer in the Department of Biochemistry, University of Oxford, joining New College, yet also made a member of the Senior Common Room at Hertford College. He was a moderator for exams in physiology having been asked by Professor Sir Lindor Brown, the Waynflete Professors of Physiology. A real advance in physiology was made by Whittam in 1962 when he had three Papers published: Spatial asymmetry in the stimulation of a membrane adenosine triphosphatases; the asymmetrical stimulation of a membrane adenosine triphosphatase in relation to active cation transport and directional effects of the alkali metal ions on adenosine triphosphate hydrolysis in erythrocyte ghosts. This research was referred to by The Royal Society upon Whittam being elected a Fellow, "Ronald Whittam conducted important studies of the mechanism of active transport of ions in animal tissues. He demonstrated the special asymmetry of the ATPase of the red blood cell membrane, which acts only when Na^{+} is inside and K^{+} is outside the membrane. He was the first to demonstrate that active transport can exert a feedback control over the rate of cellular metabolism. These concepts, of directionality as an inherent part of an enzyme reaction in membranes, are of fundamental significance for the understanding of the relations between physiological function and the mechanism of enzyme action."

During 1965, he became a Bruno Mendel Fellow of the Royal Society conducting research at the Weizmann Institute of Science, Israel. There he worked with Izzy Edelman. Ephraim Katzir had oversight as Head of the Department of Biophysics.

In 1966, Whittam became the first Chair of General Physiology in the University of Leicester, where he established a new Laboratory of Physiology, that was re-titled in 1968 as the Department of Physiology. It was the first Chair of General Physiology to have been created in Britain since Professor Sir William Bayliss was created Chair at University College London. He ran one of the largest physiology departments in UK universities, outside of Oxford and Cambridge. A lot of funding was hypothecated from the University Grants Committee.

Whittam made significant contributions to the administration of physiology and the shape of biological sciences in the following positions: 1963 to 1967, member of the Editorial Board of Biochemical Journal; 1969 to 1974, Honorary Secretary of The Physiological Society; 1969 to 1974, member of the Biological Research Board of Medical Research Council; 1973 to 1974, Co-Chairman of the Biological Research Board of the Medical Research Council, with Professor Rodney Porter; 1974 to 1977, Chairman of the Biological Education Committee of the Royal Society and Institute of Biology; 1974 to 1982, member of the Biological Sciences Committee of the University Grants Committee 1979 to 1982, Dean of Faculty of Science at the University of Leicester; 1979 to 1983, member of the Education Committee of the Royal Society.

In 1983, Whittam became an Emeritus Professor of the University of Leicester.

== Personal life and death ==
Whittam married Christine Patricia Margaret Lamb, the second daughter of Canon John W. Lamb, which marriage was officiated by Archbishop Michael Ramsey in 1957. They had one son and one daughter.

Early in his academic career, Whittam was a member of the Manchester University Mountaineering Club. A passion for walking continued into his nineties.

Ronald Whittam died at Leicester Royal Infirmary on 16 August 2023, at the age of 98.

== Awards and honours ==
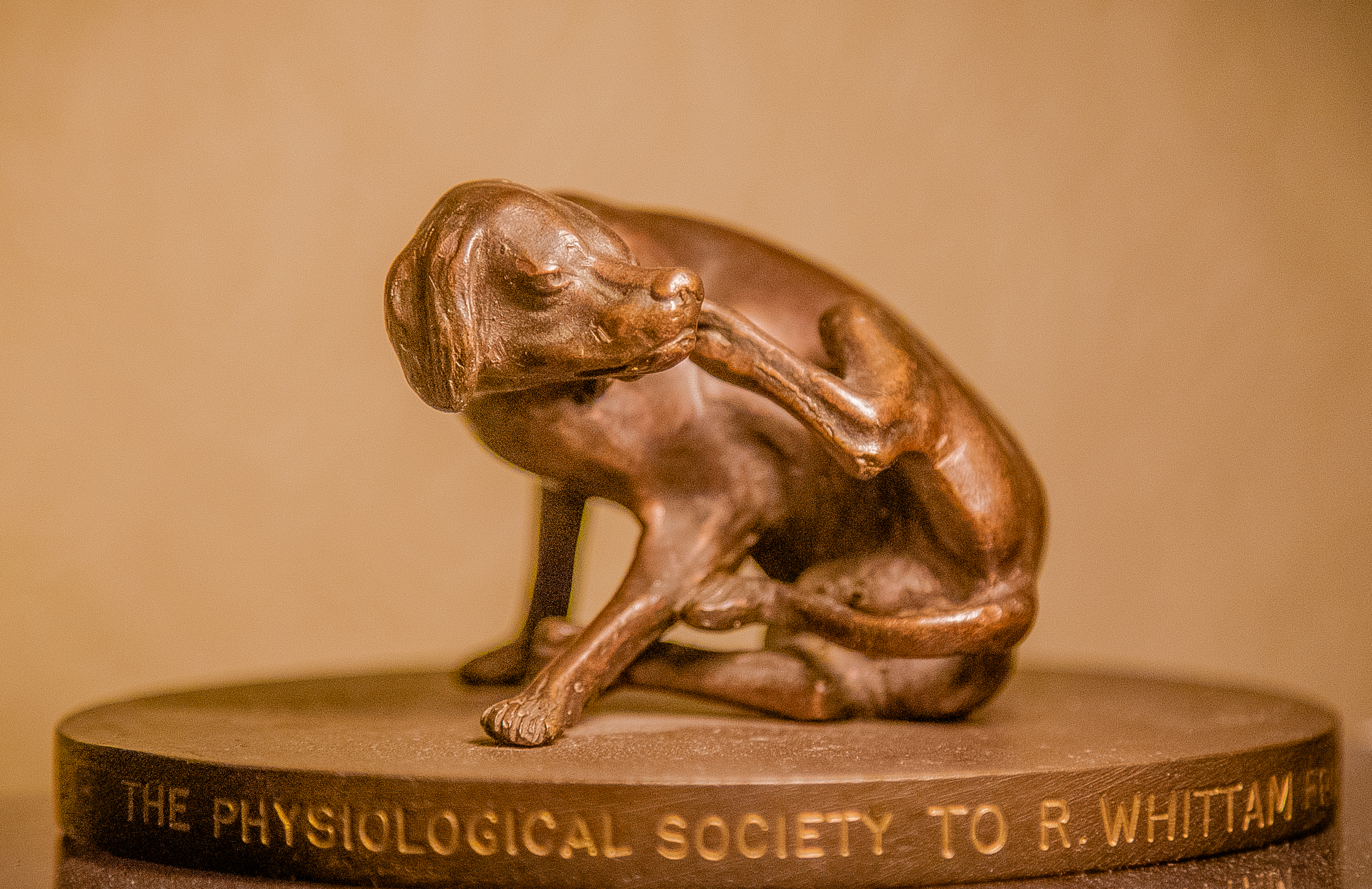
Replica of The Physiological Society's mascot

- 1986: Honorary Member of The Physiological Society
- 1973: Fellow of The Royal Society (FRS)
- 1965: The Royal Society, Bruno Mendel Fellow
- 1958: Beit Memorial Fellow
- 1954: John Stokes Research Fellow, University of Sheffield

== Publications ==
- Whittam, Ronald (1964), Transport and diffusion in red blood cells, London, UK: Edward Arnold Pub., ISBN 9780713141153
- General Physiology and the Biological Sciences (Leicester University Press, 1966), OCLC 669687948.

Professional and academic associations
Preceded by John S. Gillespie	Hon.Secretary of The Physiological Society; 1969–1974	Succeeded by Sidney M. Hilton
Academic offices
Preceded by New Office	1st Professor of Physiology University of Leicester; 1966–1983	Succeeded by Asa Blakely
Preceded by George MacLellan	Dean of the Faculty of Science University of Leicester; 1979–1982	Succeeded by Wladyslaw Sluckin
