= Keith Dalziel =

British biochemist (1921–1994)

- Born: 24 August 1921; Salford, England
- Died: 7 January 1994 (aged 72)
- Known for: Kinetic analysis of two-substrate reactions
- Spouse: Sallie Farnworth
- Children: 2
- Scientific career
- Fields: Enzymes (especially alcohol dehydrogenase), kinetics
- Institutions: Department of Biochemistry, University of Oxford

Professor Keith Dalziel F.R.S. (24 August 1921 – 7 January 1994) was a British biochemist.

== Life ==
Dalziel was born in Salford, the youngest of four children of Gilbert and Edith Dalziel. His father, born in Dumfries, Scotland, worked as a mechanic, lorry driver and chauffeur. He was the first of his family to enter higher education. He married Sallie Farnworth in 1945, and the couple had two daughters, born in 1947 and 1952. He died on 7 January 1994. The name Dalziel is of Scottish origin and it is pronounced [dɪj'el] with only slightly more stress on the second syllable, essentially like the prefix d,l in d,l-lactic acid.

== Career ==
Dalziel spent the greater part of his scientific career at the Department of Biochemistry of the University of Oxford. He worked primarily on liver alcohol dehydrogenases, and is well known in enzymology for his idiosyncratic way of representing the kinetic equations of two-substrate reactions. He wrote the typical equation as follows:

$\frac{[\mathrm{E_0}]}{v} = \phi_0 + \frac{\phi_\mathrm{A}}{[\mathrm{A}]} + \frac{\phi_\mathrm{B}}{[\mathrm{B}]} + \frac{\phi_\mathrm{AB}}{[\mathrm{A}][\mathrm{B}]}$

for a reaction between A and B with rate v. The coefficients $\phi$ are known as Dalziel coefficients. This system has not been widely adopted. A more usual way of writing the same relationship (with the same symbols for the concentrations) would be as follows:

$v = \frac{k_0[\mathrm{E_0}][\mathrm{A}][\mathrm{B}]} {K_{\mathrm{iA}}K_{\mathrm{mB}} + K_{\mathrm{mB}}[\mathrm{A}] + K_{\mathrm{mA}}[\mathrm{B}] + [\mathrm{A}][\mathrm{B}] }$

Here $K_{\mathrm{mA}}$ and $K_{\mathrm{mB}}$ are the Michaelis constants (concentrations at half-saturation) for A and B at limiting (saturating) concentrations of B and A respectively, and $K_{\mathrm{iA}}$ (not the same as $K_{\mathrm{mA}}$) is a type of inhibition constant.

Dalziel was a professorial fellow of Wolfson College, and in 1975 was elected a Fellow of the Royal Society
