= Elizabeth Press =

British immunologist

- Born: 5 October 1920; Marylebone, London, England
- Died: 30 December 2008 (aged 88)
- Education: Queen Mary College, London
- Scientific career
- Fields: Immunology
- Workplaces: National Institute for Medical Research, St Mary's Hospital and Medical Research Council
- Notable students: Nancy Hogg

Elizabeth Marian Press (5 October 1920 – 30 December 2008) was a British immunologist, best known for her work with Rodney Porter on the structure of antibodies. She worked side by side with Porter for 25 years, at the National Institute for Medical Research, St Mary's Hospital and in the Medical Research Council Immunochemistry Unit, and played a major role in him being awarded the Nobel Prize in 1972.

== Early life and education ==
Elizabeth Press was born on 5 October 1920 at 85 Crawford Street, Marylebone, London, the only child of Sydney George Press, the manager of a zinc and plumbing business, and Hilda Marian Press (née Hall), who was a ladies' maid before marriage.

Press was 19 years old when the Second World War started, and joined the Women's Royal Naval Service (WRNS, "the Wrens"). After the war, she obtained a BSc in chemistry at Queen Mary College, London, and had research experience at the Middlesex Hospital Medical School.

== Career ==
On 1 October 1955, Press joined Rodney Porter's research group at the National Institute for Medical Research, Mill Hill, London.

Her studies on antibodies were important in determining the chain structure, and particularly the observation that more than one gene was involved in coding for antibodies. Her work led to Porter's Nobel Prize in 1972, together with Gerald Edelman. The structural studies on antibodies were essential in the chain of scientific discoveries which led to the development of monoclonal antibodies by César Milstein, and led to the subsequent development of monoclonal antibodies which are now widely used as treatment for many cancers.

Science described Press as "a 'major' yet largely unknown contributor to the field of immunology".

Although she only had a BSc herself, Press supervised the PhD research of others, including Nancy Hogg, now a group leader at Cancer Research UK.

== The chain structure of antibodies ==
Press's work provided the first evidence that immunoglobulin heavy chains had variable regions similar to those observed in light chains, and identified a particularly variable segment, now known as complementarity-determining region 3. Her research also pointed to evidence that at least two genes are involved in the synthesis of the heavy chain.
