= Rivka Carmi =

Israeli pediatrician and geneticist (born 1948)

- רבקה כרמי
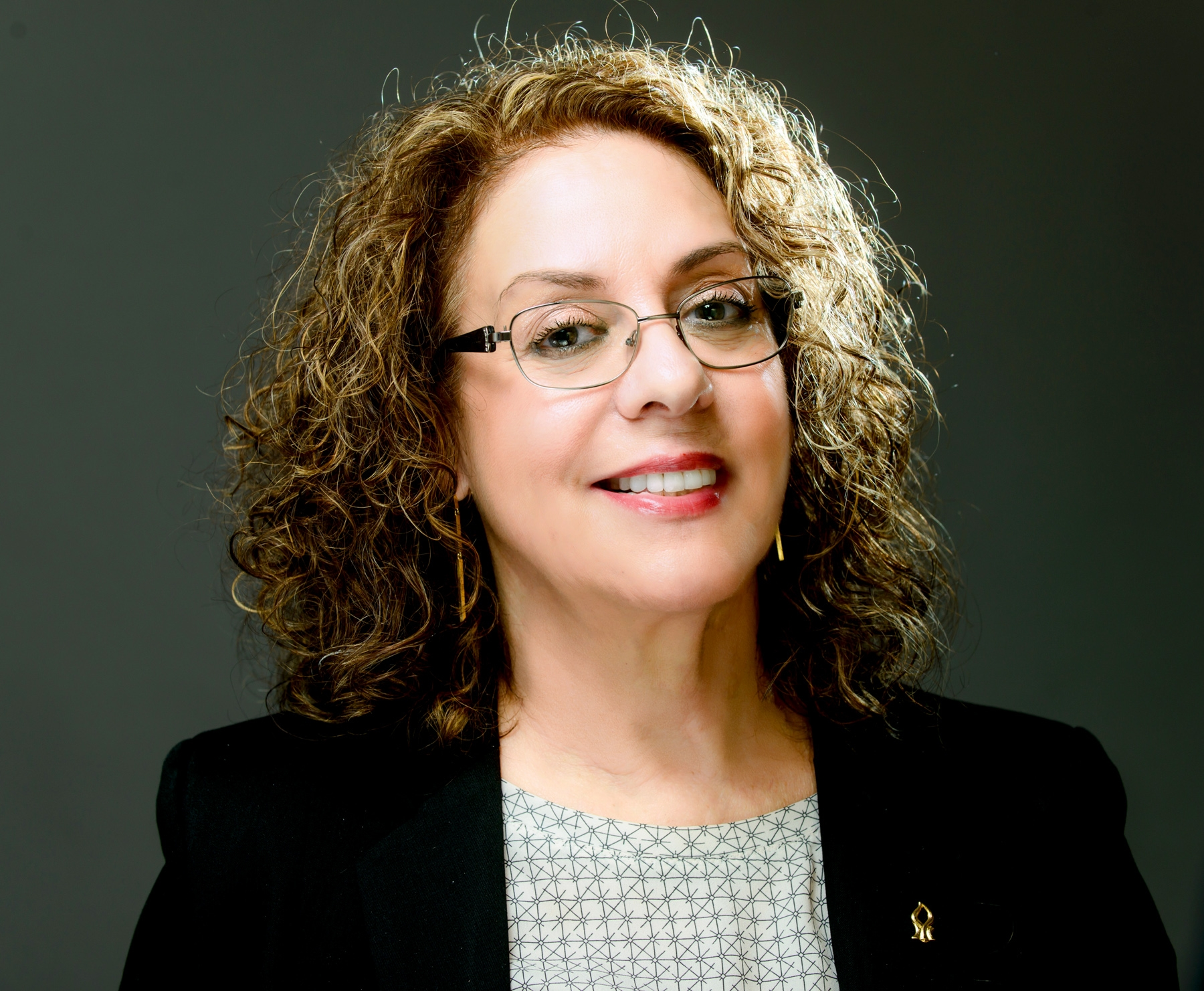
- Rivka Carmi (2015)
- Born: 1948 (age 77–78); Zikhron Ya'akov, Israel
- Education: The Hebrew University of Jerusalem Hadassah Medical School; Soroka University Medical Center (residency in pediatrics and fellowship in neonatology); Boston Children's Hospital and Harvard Medical School (fellowship in medical genetics)
- Occupations: pediatrician and geneticist
- Known for: Molecular basis of genetic diseases in the Negev Arab-Bedouin population; President of Ben-Gurion University of the Negev

Rivka Carmi (Hebrew: רבקה כרמי; born 1948) is an Israeli pediatrician and geneticist. She served as President of Ben-Gurion University of the Negev (BGU) from May 2006 until December 2018. Carmi is the first woman to be appointed president of an Israeli university.

== Early life ==
Carmi was born in Zikhron Ya'akov, Israel. Her mother, Zipora, was a social worker. Her father, Menachem, was an accountant, a painter and an amateur archaeologist who died when Carmi was 14 years old.

She was an officer in the Israeli Defence Forces (Captain), and served as the commander of academics officers' training school. During the Yom Kippur War, she helped establish the missing in action (MIA) accounting unit in the IDF.

Carmi is a graduate of The Hebrew University of Jerusalem Hadassah Medical School. She completed a residency in pediatrics and a fellowship in neonatology at the Soroka University Medical Center and an additional fellowship in medical genetics at Boston Children's Hospital and Harvard University Medical School.

== Medical and academic career ==
Carmi's research focused mainly on the delineation of the clinical manifestations and molecular basis of genetic diseases in the Negev Arab-Bedouin population. Author of over 150 publications in medical genetics, her research included the identification of 12 new genes and the delineation of 2 new syndromes, one of which is known as the Carmi Syndrome. Carmi's first academic publication (1977) described an accumulation of carbon dioxide oxygen hoods, infant cots and incubators in possible relation with the sudden infant death syndrome phenomenon. Her community outreach projects were aimed at preventing hereditary diseases and advancing women's education in the Bedouin community. She was involved with the establishment of biotechnology initiatives at Ben-Gurion University of the Negev, and served as the Acting Director of the nascent National Institute for Biotechnology in the Negev.

She served as President of Ben-Gurion University of the Negev (BGU) from May 2006 – December 2018. She succeeded Avishay Braverman, and was followed by Daniel Chamovitz.

== Public positions ==
Carmi is a member of the Advisory Board of the Genesis Prize Foundation. She is a founding member of the UK-Israel Science Council and served as its co-chair alongside Professor Raymond Dwek in the years 2010–2017. On April 4, 2013, the Minister of Justice, MP Tzipi Livni, appointed Carmi to be part of the Rivlin Committee. The committee examined the compensation agreement for workers of the nuclear research facility in Dimona that were exposed to ionizing radiation and diagnosed with cancer.

In May 2014 Carmi was appointed to the Locker Committee which examined Israel's national defense budget. In 2011 she was appointed chairperson of the Promotion and Representation of Women in Higher Education Institutions Committee (the Carmi Team). In 2015 she headed the task force of the Israeli Medical Association established to study the status of women in medicine.

Between the years 2021 and 2023 she was the chairwoman of TELEM (the Council for National Research Infrastructures Committee for Bio-convergence).

Currently (2025), Prof. Carmi serves as the Founding President of the Israel Academy of Science in Medicine by the Israeli Medical Association (founded in 2019), Chairwoman of the TELEM Scientific Advisory Committee for Bio-convergence, Chairwoman of ScienceAbroad, chairwoman of the CHE Advisory Committee on Medical Education, Research fellow at the Shmuel Neeman Institute, board member - 8400, Levinski-Wingate Academic Center, Desert stars and additional startups boards.

== Controversy ==
In November 2017, the search committee for president recommended extending Carmi's tenure as president by two additional years, through May 2020. In response, the academic senate held an extraordinary meeting, in which it declared that the search committee failed and called for the resignation of the chair of the executive committee, Asher Heled. The executive committee decided to approve the extension despite the objections of the academic staff, which resulted in further protest. The State Comptroller of Israel launched an investigation into the selection process. In response, Carmi stated: "What I have in mind is the good of the university, so once a person is elected to head it, I will be the first to congratulate, to vacate my place and to pave the way for anyone found to be suitable – even if it is earlier than the two years that I was asked to fill.

In February 2018, the executive committee announced that a new president would be elected by the end of year.

== Awards and recognition ==
- 2020 - the Landau Lifetime Award in Medicine
- 2019 – Honorary degree, Brandeis University, Massachusetts, USA
- 2016 – Jewish 100 awardees, The Algemeiner
- 2015 – One of the BBC's 100 Women
- 2015 – Honorary Commander of the Order of the British Empire (CBE)
- 2015 – The Paul Harris Fellow recognition, Rotary
- 2013 – Honorary degree, Dalhousie University, Halifax, Canada
- 2010 – An Honorary Fellowship by the Interdisciplinary Center (IDC) in Herzliya
- 2009 – An award in excellence from the Israel Ambulatory Pediatric Association (IAPA)
- 2008 – Women of Distinction Award of the Hadassah Women's Zionist Organization of America
- 2003 – Achievement in Medicine Award by the Municipality of Beer–Sheva
- 2002 – Award for Peace from the Canada International Scientific Exchange Program (CISEPO), to which she served as representative of the Israeli Medical Deans
- 2001 – Lifetime Achievement Award by the Yated organization for children with Downs Syndrome
