= Nancy Hogg =

Immunologist

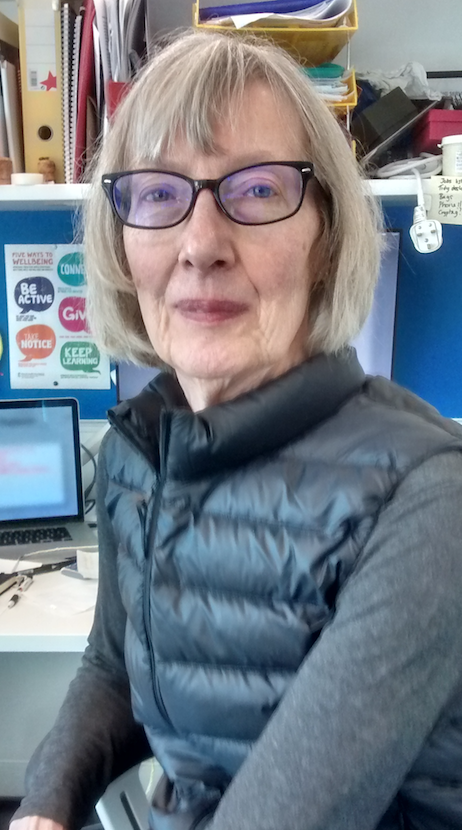
- Known for: Study of Leukocyte Integrins
- Scientific career
- Fields: Immunology

Nancy Hogg FMedSci is an immunologist who has made major contributions in the field of adhesion molecules, focusing on the integrins expressed by leukocytes. Hogg was elected to the Academy of Medical Sciences in 2002 and currently holds an emeritus position at the Francis Crick Institute, London.

== Education and academic career ==
Nancy Hogg studied for a BSc at the University of Toronto. She was awarded a PhD working with Rodney Porter firstly at the University of London and then at Department of Biochemistry, University of Oxford. This was followed by a post–doctoral period at National Institute for Medical Research and finally a position at the Imperial Cancer Research Fund (which became Cancer Research UK London Research Institute and is now part of the Francis Crick Institute). Hogg was located initially at University College London followed by a move to the main laboratories in Lincoln’s Inn Fields where she set up her laboratory focusing initially on the function of macrophages, but then increasingly on the adhesion molecules termed integrins expressed by all leukocytes.

== Research interests ==
Nancy Hogg’s PhD project involved the protein sequencing of immunoglobulin heavy chains identifying for the first time the heterogeneity that accounts for immunoglobulin specificity. During a postdoctoral period at the Imperial Cancer Research Fund she co-discovered the protein that is now known as fibronectin. Through study of leukocyte integrin LFA-1 and particularly special mAb 24, Hogg was the first to document that the state of integrin activity could be controlled by bound divalent cations. The active forms are linked to different cytoskeletal proteins, namely talin for high affinity and a-actinin for clustered intermediate affinity LFA-1 . The lab showed that the LFA-1 ligand ICAM-1 was a target for pathogen binding, for example the malaria parasite Plasmodium falciparum. The generation of LFA-1 null mice revealed the central role of LFA-1 in leukocyte migration within lymph nodes in vivo. Hogg also first identified and characterised unique Leukocyte Adhesion Deficiency-III patients that expressed inactive leukocyte integrins. This integrin malfunction was due to mutation in protein kindlin-3.

Hogg has also studied the S100A8/S100A9 proteins that constitute 45% of neutrophil cytosolic protein. S100a9 null mice demonstrated that myeloid cells could function relatively normally without these proteins but they had a major role in responding to infections such as Streptococcus pneumoniae in terms of cytokine generation.

== Professional associations and awards ==
- Member of British Society of Immunology
- 1996 Co-founder of UK Adhesion Society, now UK Cell Adhesion Society
- In 2002 Hogg was elected to Academy of Medical Sciences.
- In 2013 Hogg was awarded the William Harvey Medal
