= Rob Klose =

Canadian geneticist

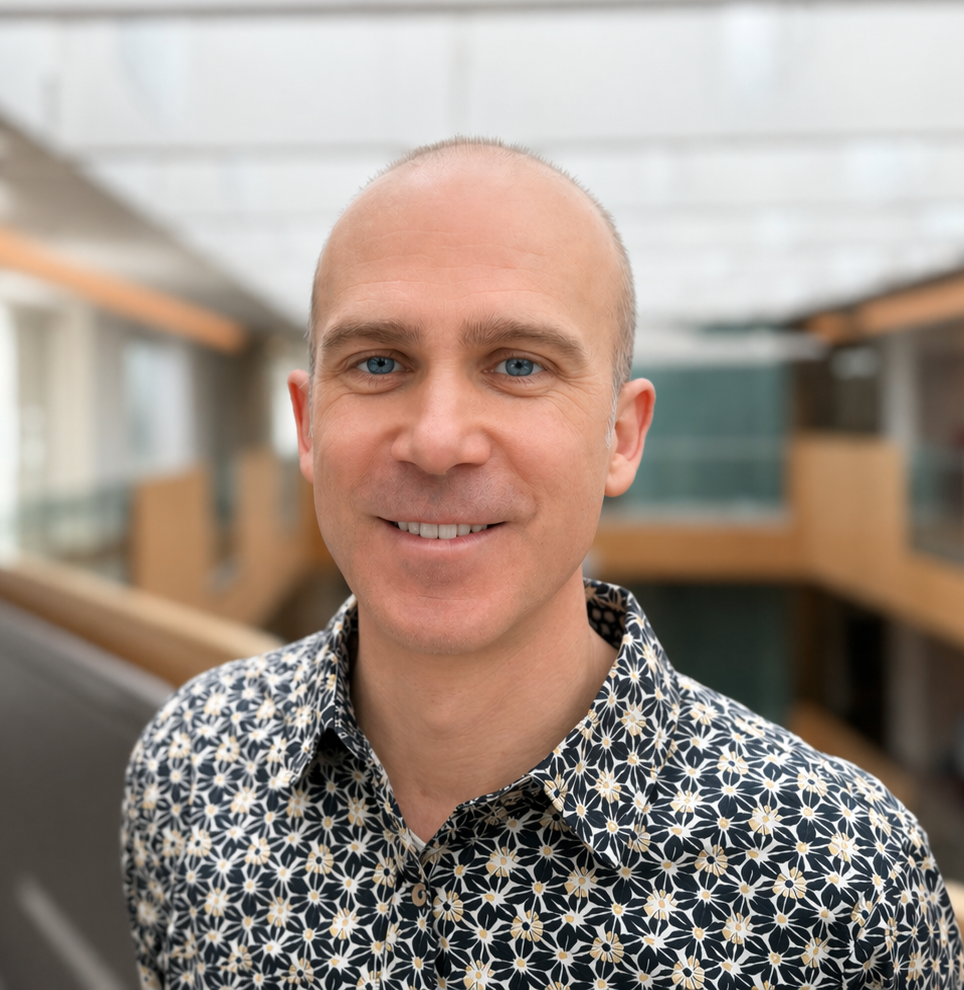
- Rob Klose in 2026
- Born: December 28, 1977 (age 48)
- Education: University of Waterloo (BSc); University of Edinburgh (PhD)
- Awards: Francis Crick Medal and Lecture (2015); EMBO Membership (2021); Fellow of the Royal Society (2026)
- Scientific career
- Workplaces: University of Oxford (2008–2013); University of North Carolina at Chapel Hill (2005–2007)
- Scientific career
- Known for: Research on chromatin-based and epigenetic mechanisms
- Thesis: Biochemical analysis of MeCP2 (2005)
- Doctoral advisor: Adrian Bird
- Website: kloselab.co.uk

Rob Klose (born December 28, 1977) is a Canadian researcher and Professor of Genetics at the Department of Biochemistry, University of Oxford. His research investigates how chromatin-based and epigenetic mechanisms contribute to the ways in which gene expression is regulated.

== Education ==
Klose was an undergraduate student at the University of Waterloo in Ontario, Canada, where he graduated with Dean's Honors in Biology. He was a postgraduate student supervised by Adrian Bird at the Wellcome Centre for Cell Biology at the University of Edinburgh, Scotland, where he studied the methyl CpG binding protein MeCP2, part of the DNA methylation system, which is associated with Rett syndrome. He obtained his Doctor of Philosophy in 2005.

== Career and research ==
Klose spent two years as a postdoctoral researcher in the laboratory of Yi Zhang, who was based at the University of North Carolina at Chapel Hill, identifying a novel family of histone lysine demethylase enzymes. He then moved to the University of Oxford where, in 2008, he established himself as a Principal Investigator at the Department of Biochemistry at Oxford supported by a Wellcome Trust career development fellowship. Five years after this, he secured a Wellcome Trust senior research fellowship. Since then, he has been a Monsanto senior research fellow, a post associated with Exeter College, Oxford, and in 2014 was appointed as professor of cell and molecular biology. In 2017 he was appointed Professor of Genetics, University of Oxford, a chair held at the department of biochemistry and associated with a fellowship at Keble College, Oxford.

Klose's work throughout his career has sought to explain how, during development, cell types with the same DNA use chromatin-based and epigenetic mechanisms to restrict gene expression to the correct complement of genes in a stable and heritable way. In particular, he has focused on understanding how DNA encoded regulatory elements in vertebrates, called CpG islands, help to achieve appropriately controlled gene usage.

=== Awards and honours ===
Klose was awarded a European Molecular Biology Organization (EMBO) young investigator programme fellowship in 2010 and was awarded a Lister Institute of Preventive Medicine Research prize in 2011. In recognition of his achievements as an early career stage scientist, he was awarded the Francis Crick Lecture by the Royal Society in 2015. He was elected EMBO Member in 2021 and elected a Fellow of the Royal Society in 2026.
