= Raymond Dwek =

British scientist

Raymond Allen Dwek CBE FRS FRSC (born 10 November 1941) is a scientist at the University of Oxford and co-founder of the biotechnology company Oxford GlycoSciences Ltd.

== Biography ==
Dwek was educated at Carmel College, and the University of Manchester, where he studied chemistry (1960–64). He then went to Oxford University and Lincoln College, Oxford, where he completed his DPhil in physical chemistry in 1966. He became Professor of Glycobiology in 1988 in the Department of Biochemistry. He is an emeritus fellow of Exeter College, Oxford and since 2014, emeritus director of the Oxford Glycobiology Institute, which he founded in 1991. From 2000 to 2006, he was also head of the Department of Biochemistry. He was a member of the Board of Scientific Governors at The Scripps Research Institute from 2007 to 2015 and an Institute Professor there in 2008. Dwek was President of the Institute of Biology from 2008 to 2010, overseeing the merger with the UK Science Federation to form the Royal Society of Biology. Dwek was the Kluge Chair of Technology and Society at the Library of Congress in the US in 2007. He was scientific advisor to the presidents of Ben-Gurion University of the Negev in Israel from 1997 to 2019, where he helped to build the National Institute of Biotechnology in the Negev. He was also scientific advisor to the Institute of Biochemistry in Bucharest. Dwek was co-chair of the UK/Israel Science Council from 2012 to 2017. Since 2013, Dwek has been a member of the scientific governing board of the newly established ShanghaiTech University.

== Academic and scientific career ==
Dwek read chemistry (1960–64) at the University of Manchester. He completed his DPhil in physical chemistry at Oxford in 1966. Following this, he became a research lecturer at Christ Church, Oxford, where he taught physical and inorganic chemistry. In 1969, he was invited to join the Biochemistry Department, working with other members of the Oxford Enzyme Group. In 1974, he was elected Royal Society Locke Research fellow, working on antibodies. This led to his appointment as university lecturer in biochemistry with a fellowship, by special election, at Exeter College in 1976. At the same time, he was also appointed a lecturer in biochemistry at Trinity College to help build up the subject there.

Dwek's research on antibodies led directly to defining the function of the attached oligosaccharides and from which the field of glycobiology emerged – a word coined by Dwek which entered the Oxford English Dictionary in 1992. In 1988, Dwek was made Professor of Glycobiology. In 1985, Dwek secured the first industrial grant to Oxford University in its 950-year history, from Monsanto Company USA, which was developing a pharmaceutical arm. The grant was to develop the technology for sequencing oligosaccharides. Over 13 years the value of the grant was almost $100M. In 1991, Dwek became Director of the Glycobiology Institute which he founded and which was built with funds from Monsanto/Searle.

Also in 1988, Dwek was the founding scientist and non-executive director of Oxford GlycoSciences Plc (formerly Oxford GlycoSystems), which was established to commercialise technologies arising from his research at the Glycobiology Institute. In 1995, the company was mentioned as part of the Queen's Anniversary Prize to the University of Oxford. In 1998, it was publicly quoted on the London Stock Exchange.

In 2002 in collaboration with Glycobiology Institute, Oxford GlycoSciences had a drug for Gaucher disease approved worldwide.

In 1998, Dwek was also the founding scientist and chairman of the Scientific Board and Director of Synergy, which was established in the United States to develop antiviral agents for the treatment of chronic Hepatitis B and C infections. This work was taken over by United Therapeutics, USA, and Dwek became a director of this company in 2002 and continues this appointment. The company sponsored the antiviral laboratory at the Glycobiology Institute from 2002 to 2017 and continues its sponsorship of the Annual Unither Barry Blumberg Virology Lecture at Oxford University (2004-2027).

Dwek is the author of Nuclear Magnetic Resonance (NMR) in biochemistry – application to enzyme systems (OUP, 1973), Principles and Problems in Physical Chemistry for Biochemists, with N C Price (OUP, 1974) and Biology Spectroscopy with I D Campbell (Benjamin Cummings, 1984). He has published over 600 peer reviewed articles and about 100 patents.

== Awards and recognition ==
Dwek has received honorary doctorates from the Katholieke Universiteit Leuven, Belgium (1996), Ben-Gurion University of the Negev, Israel (2001), the Scripps Research Institute, USA (2004), Cluj University, Romania (2006) and University College Dublin, Ireland (2010).

Other honours include the 7th Wellcome Trust Award for Research in Biochemistry Related to Medicine (1994), the First Scientific Leadership Award of the Hepatitis B Foundation (1997), The Romanian Order of Merit (2000), the Huxley Medal of the Institute of Biology (2007) and the K.T. Wang Bioorganic Chemistry Prize and Lecture, Taiwan. He held the Kluge Chair in Technology and Society at the Library of Congress, USA in 2007. He is an Honorary Fellow of Lincoln College, Oxford (2004). He was a director of ISIS Innovation (now called Oxford University Innovation, OUI) – the University's Intellectual Property Company (2003–8). He was the founding Chairman of Oxford University Consulting, now part of OUI.

Dwek was elected a member of the European Molecular Biology Organization in 1988, a Fellow of the Royal Society of Chemistry in 1993, a Fellow of the Royal Society in 1998, a foreign member of the American Philosophical Society in 2006, and Hon Fellow of the Royal College of Physicians in 2007. He was the head of the Biochemistry Department from 2000 to 2007 and President of the Institute of Biology from 2008 to 2010. He is a founding member of the UK-Israel Science Council and served as its co-chair alongside Professor Rivka Carmi in the years 2010–2017.

Dwek was appointed Commander of the Order of the British Empire (CBE) in the 2013 New Year Honours for services to UK/Israel scientific collaboration and in 2018 received a Lifetime Achievement Award from Ben-Gurion University.

== Published works ==
- Dwek, Raymond A. (1973). Nuclear Magnetic Resonance (N.M.R.) in Biochemistry: Applications to Enzyme Systems. Oxford: Clarendon Press. ISBN 978-0-19-854614-6.
- Price, Nicholas C.; Dwek, Raymond A. (1974). Principles and Problems in Physical Chemistry for Biochemists. Oxford: Clarendon Press. ISBN 978-0-19-854129-5.
  - (1979). 2nd ed. ISBN 0-19-855511-3
- Campbell, Iain D.; Dwek, Raymond A. (1984). Biological Spectroscopy. Menlo Park, Calif.: Benjamin/Cummings. ISBN 978-0-8053-1847-0.
