= Department of Biochemistry, University of Oxford =

Faculty at the University of Oxford

Department of Biochemistry
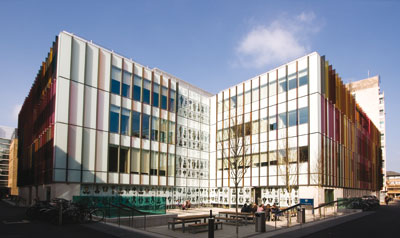
- Oxford Biochemistry Building
- Established: 1923
- Head of Department: Francis Barr
- Academic staff: 49
- Students: 450
- Undergraduates: 350
- Postgraduates: 100
- Location: Oxford, UK; 51.75943°N 1.25460°W
- Website: www.bioch.ox.ac.uk
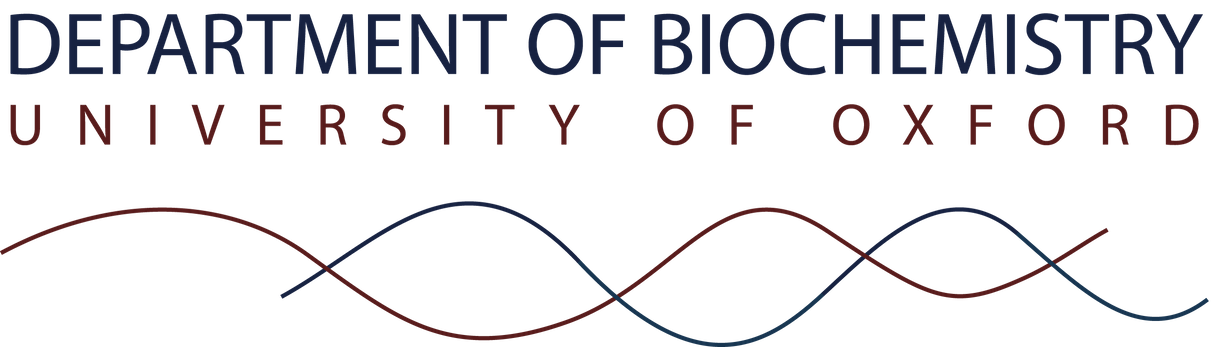

The Department of Biochemistry is an academic department of the Medical Sciences Division at the University of Oxford. It is located in Science Area, Oxford, England, United Kingdom.

== History ==
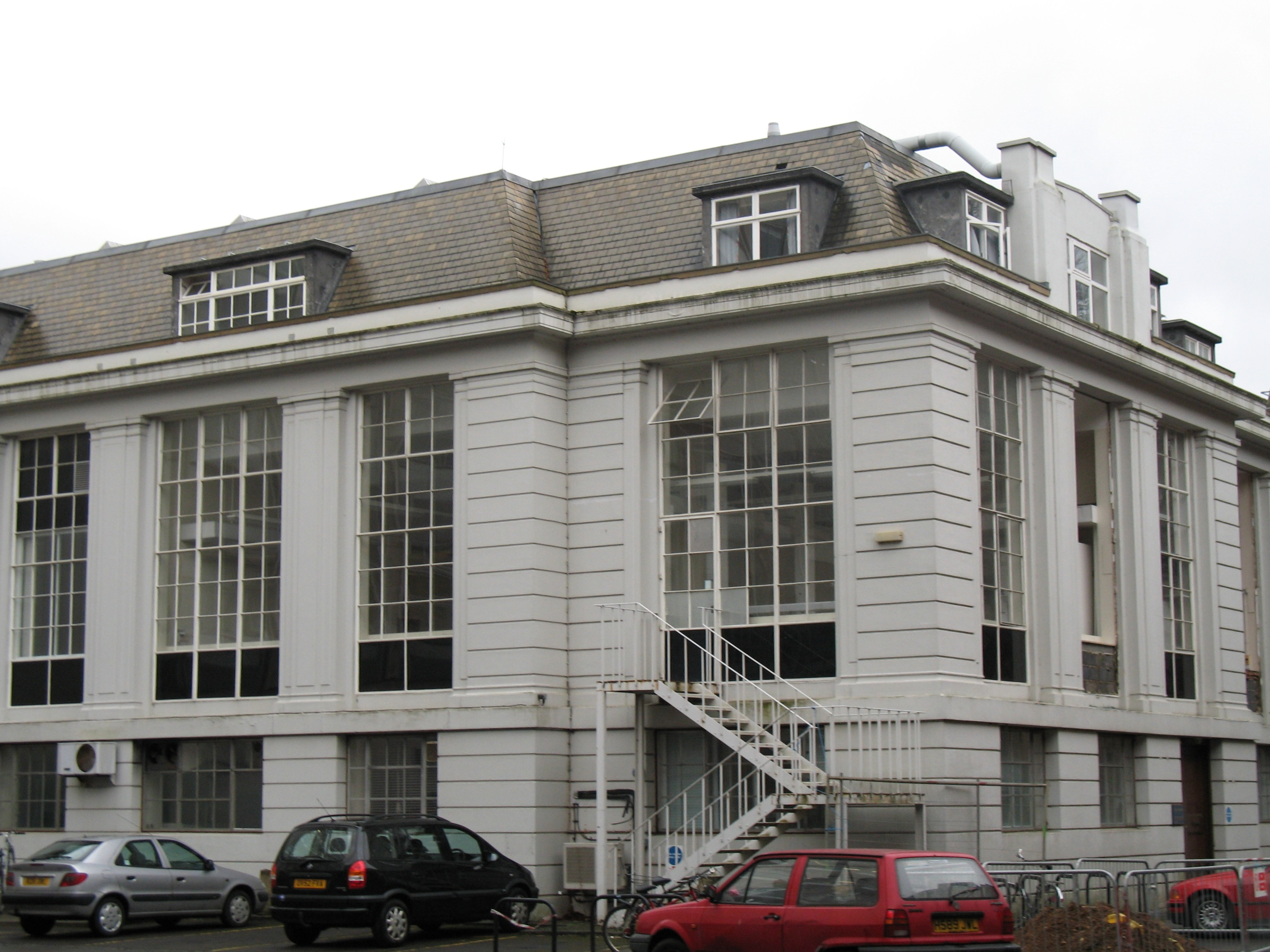
The old biochemistry Rudolf Peters Building, demolished in 2006

The Department of Biochemistry at Oxford University began as the physiological chemistry section of the Physiology Department, and acquired its own separate department and building in the 1920s. In 1920, Benjamin Moore was elected to the position of the Whitley Professor of Biochemistry, the newly established Chair of Biochemistry at Oxford University. He was followed by Rudolph Peters in 1923, and an endowment of £75,000 was soon granted by the Rockefeller Foundation for the construction of a new departmental building, purchase of equipment, and its maintenance. The Biochemistry Department building opened in 1927.

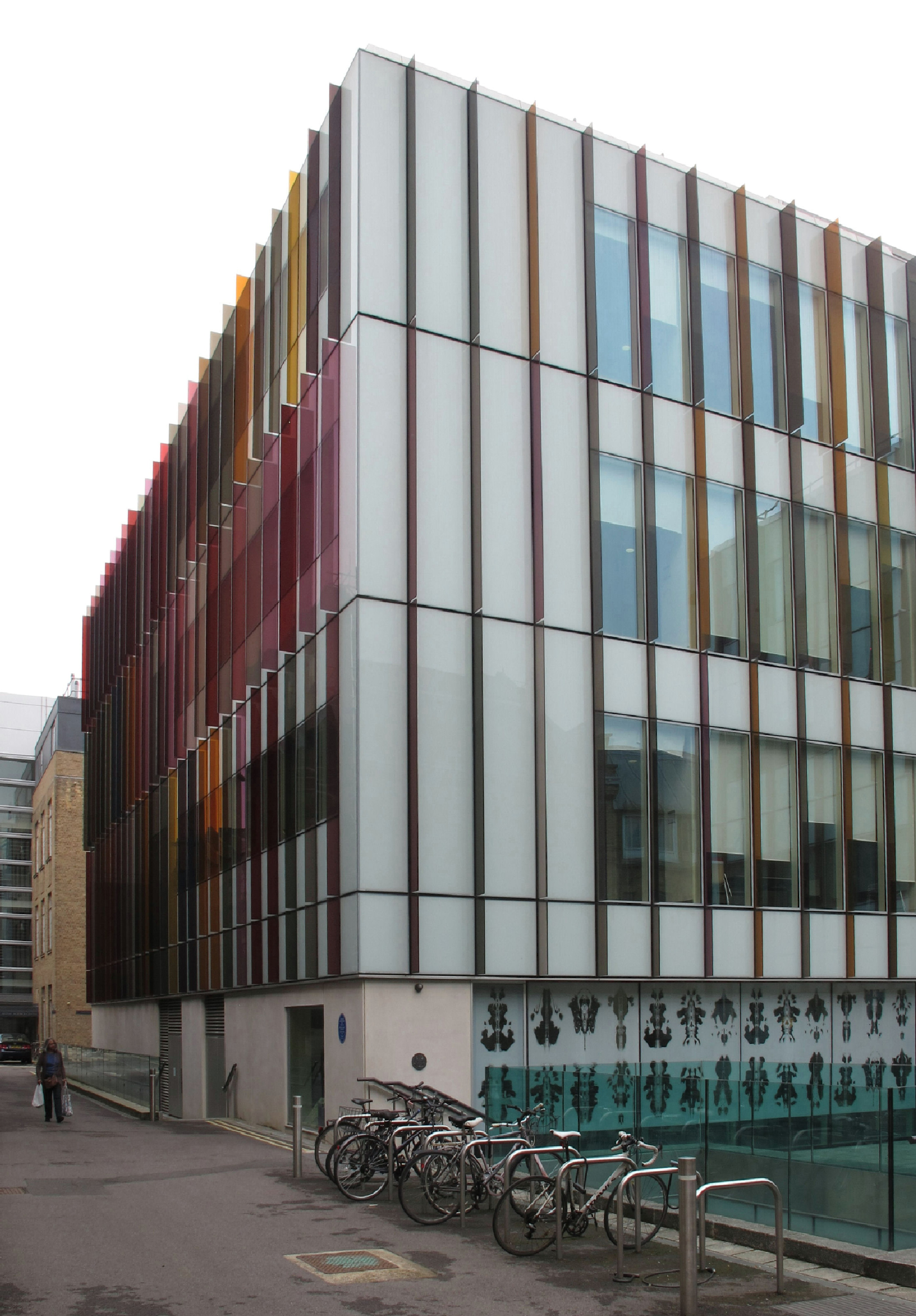
The New Biochemistry Building

In 1954, Hans Krebs was appointed the Whitley Chair of Biochemistry, and his appointment brought greater prominence to the department. He brought with him the Medical Research Council unit established to conduct research on cell metabolism. In 1955, a second professorship in the department, the Iveagh Chair of Microbiology, was established with funding from Guinness and the sub-department of Microbiology created, with Donald Woods its first holder. The eight-storey Hans Krebs Building was constructed in 1964 with funds from the Rockefeller Foundation. Krebs was succeeded by Rodney Porter in 1967. Genetics was brought into the Biochemistry Department when Walter Bodmer was appointed the first Professor of Genetics in 1970. The Laboratory of Molecular Biophysics, first established in the Zoology Department with support from Krebs and also linked to the Physical Chemistry Laboratory of the Chemistry Department, became part of the Biochemistry Department. It moved into the Rex Richards building built in 1984, with David Phillips the Professor in Molecular Biophysics. The Oxford Glycobiology Institute, headed by Raymond Dwek and housed in the Rodney Porter Building, opened in 1991.

The department is now part of the Medical Sciences Division of Oxford University, under the Divisional Boards formed in 2000. In 2006, two older biochemistry buildings were demolished, followed by two more including the Han Krebs Tower in 2014, to make way for the two-phase construction of the New Biochemistry Building. Francis Barr, the EP Abraham Professor of Mechanistic Cell Biology, is the head of the Biochemistry Department, replacing Mark Sansom, the David Phillips Professor in Molecular Biophysics, in January 2019.

== Research ==
The department is sub-divided into the following research areas:

- Cell Biology, Development and Genetics
- Chromosomal and RNA Biology
- Infection and Disease Processes
- Microbiology and Systems Biology
- Structural Biology and Molecular Biophysics

== Academic staff ==
There are around 400 research staff, with about 50 independent principal investigators who lead research groups that may range from a few people to forty or more. Members of other departments also contribute to teaching, including lecturers in physiology, pathology, pharmacology, clinical biochemistry and zoology. The department hosts the Oxford University Biochemical Society, a graduate student association that invites speakers to the University of Oxford. The head of department is Professor Francis Barr. Other members of the academic staff include Judy Armitage, Elspeth Garman, Jonathan Hodgkin, Kim Nasmyth, Neil Brockdorff, Rob Klose and Alison Woollard.

== Buildings ==
The department currently has two main buildings:

- The Dorothy Crowfoot Hodgkin building
- The Rex Richards building (housing the NMR facility in the basement)

Until 2006, two older buildings housing genetics (the Walter Bodmer building) and biochemistry (the Rudolph Peters building) were also part of the department. However, these were demolished in 2006 to make way for the first phase of the construction of the New Biochemistry building, completed in October 2008. Until 2008 biochemistry also occupied the Donald Woods building and the Hans Krebs Tower, which were demolished in 2014 for the second phase of the construction. The New Biochemistry building was renamed Dorothy Crowfoot Hodgkin building in 2022. Until 2022 biochemistry also occupied the Rodney Porter building (Oxford Glycobiology Institute).

The New Biochemistry building houses interdisciplinary research in the biosciences, including physiology, chemistry, biochemistry, and clinical neurosciences. The department moved into the purpose-built new biochemistry building during the autumn of 2008 which was designed to promote interaction and collaboration as well as provide facilities for all staff. The New Biochemistry building houses a substantial amount of contemporary art.

Former departmental buildings

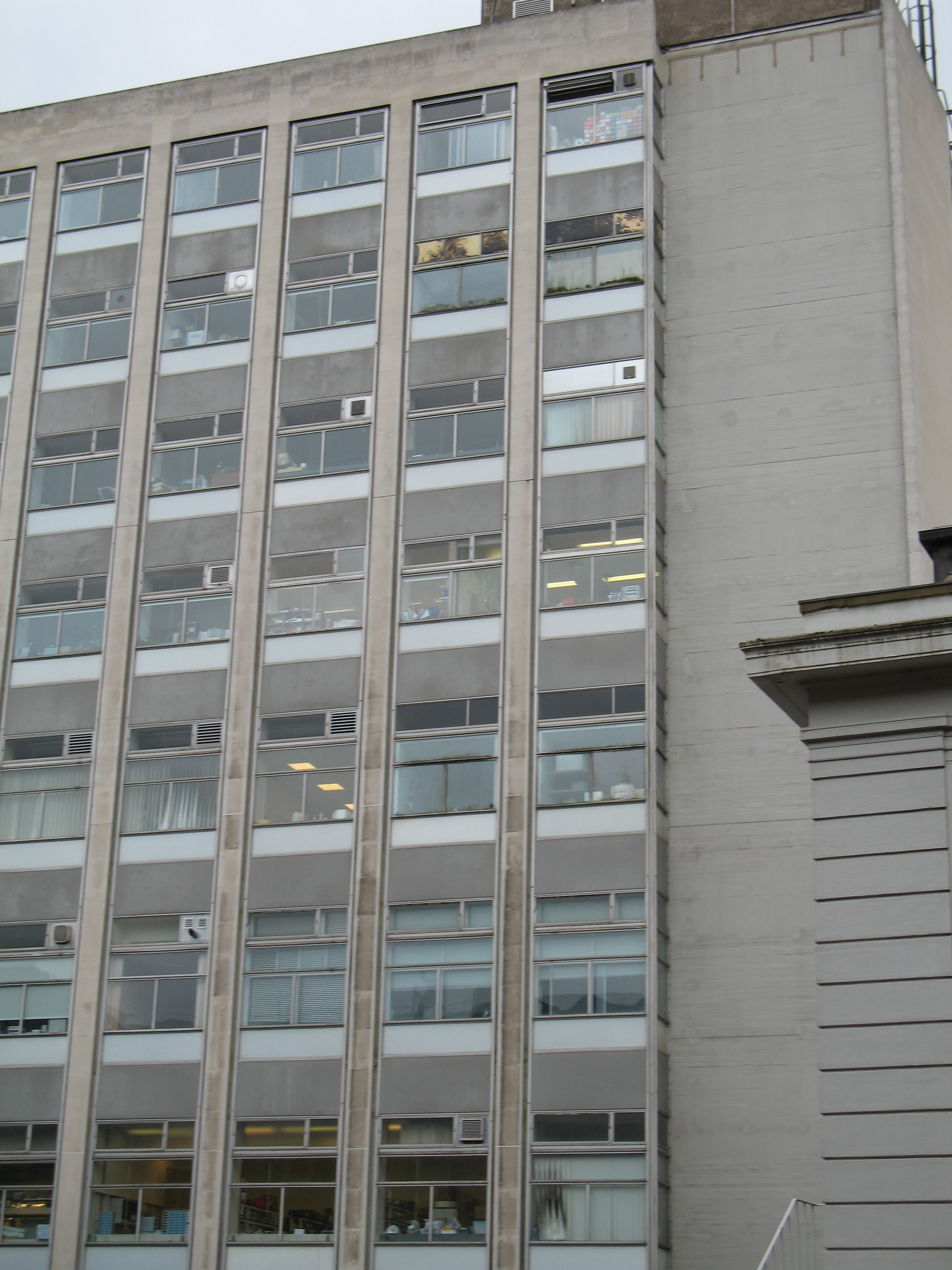
Hans Krebs Tower, demolished 2014

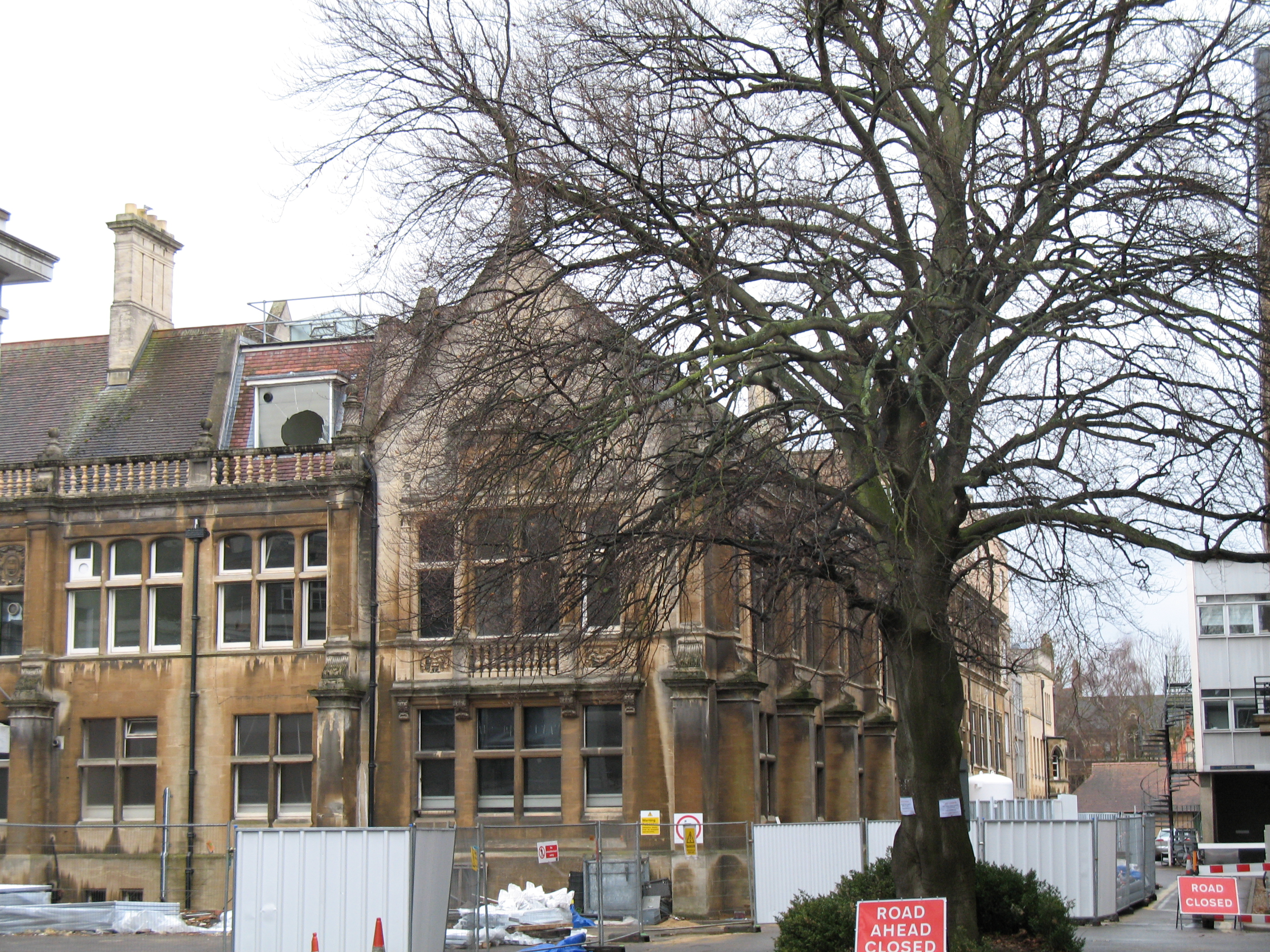
Walter Bodmer Building, demolished 2006

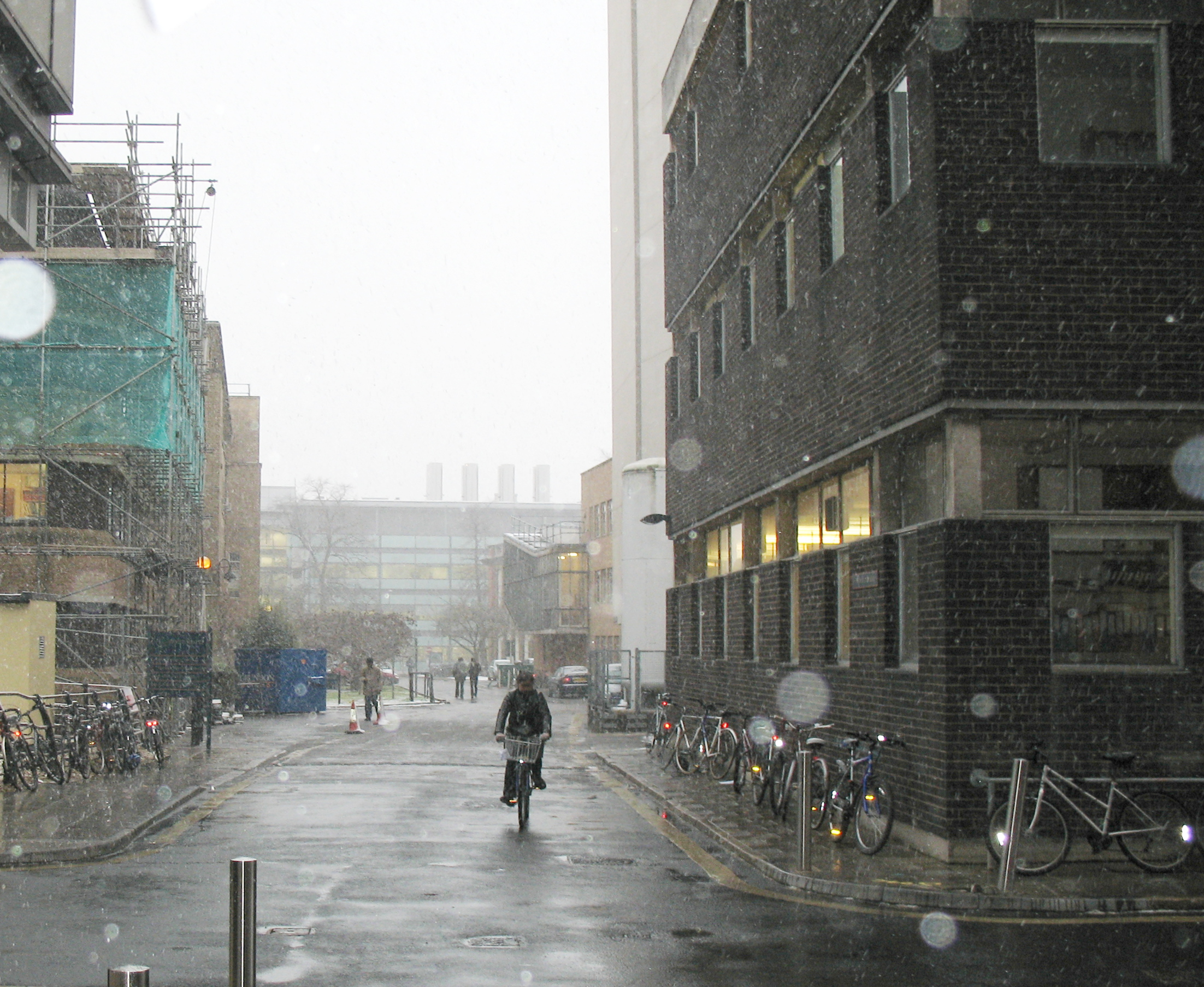
Donald Woods Building to the right, demolished 2014
