= CISEPO =

Canadian global charitable organization

- Canada International Scientific Exchange Program
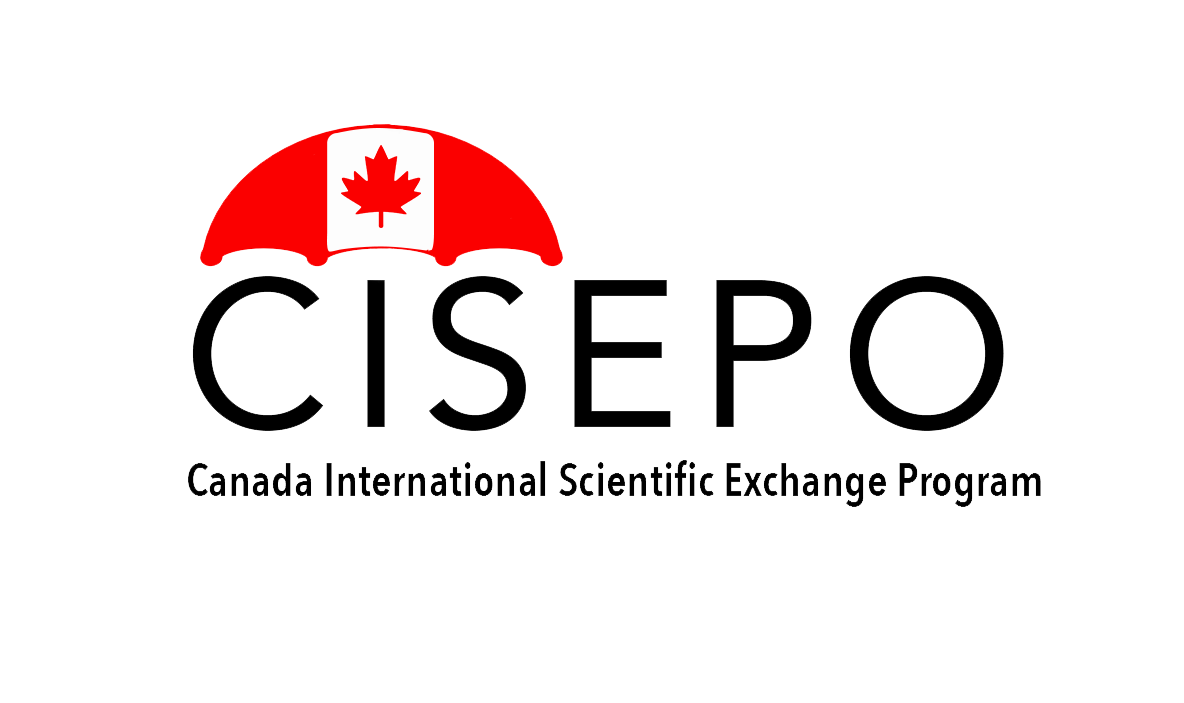
- Formation: 1984
- Founder: Arnold Noyek
- Executive Director: Shawna Novak
- Website: http://www.cisepo.ca/

The Canada International Scientific Exchange Program, commonly known as CISEPO is a Canadian-based global charitable organization that promotes global health equity, peacebuilding, and medical cooperation. CISEPO has a sister 501(c)(3) organization based in Boston, Massachusetts called the American-Canadian Scientific Exchange Program.

== History ==
CISEPO was founded in 1984 by Arnold Noyek M.D., with an initial focus on addressing hereditary deafness.

The organization received Government of Canada funding to implement newborn hearing screening in Jordan in 2007.

The organization was awarded the Canadian Red Cross Power of Humanity Award in 2004, presented to CISEPO by Rania Al-Abdullah.

CISEPO is a member of CanWaCH.

== Activities ==
CISEPO works to address global health equity and promotes peace, with a focus on the Middle East and North Africa (MENA) region and programming in over 50 countries worldwide. It delivers accredited training and education programs for technical and soft skill development to address health-workforce needs including anti-hate and critical dialogue, and designs interventions for health system strengthening. It also facilitates global knowledge transfer in healthcare and medicine and academic exchanges between healthcare facilities and universities. Activities take place in the Middle East, South-East Asia, Northern America, Western and Eastern Europe, South America, and Australasia. Partnering healthcare establishments include the Department of Global Health and Social Medicine at Harvard Medical School, Mount Sinai Hospital, the University of Toronto, Sir Mortimer B. Davis Hewish General Hospital, McGill University, the Baycrest Centre for Geriatric Care, McMaster University and the Royal College of Physicians and Surgeons of Canada.

CISEPO provides residency training to Palestinian doctors in Israeli hospitals both to improve learning and to create links to help foster peace.

CISEPO has produced 25 chapters for textbooks, produced 500 publications, including 250 peer-reviewed publications, and undertaken over 250 guest lectures. CISEPO provides one and two-year fellowships to foreign medical students in Canada.

Activities are funded by corporate donations, research grants, social impact bonds, and the Saul A. Silverman Family Foundation.

== Key people ==
- Harvey Skinner PhD, Emeritus Chair of the Board
- Shawna Novak M.D, Executive Director
- Tim Patterson M.A, Chair of the Board
- Arnold Noyek M.D, Founder
- Dennis Bojrab M.D, Regional Director
- Ziad Abdeen M.D, Regional Director
- Karen Avraham PhD, Regional Director
