= Rodney Porter =

English biochemist

Professor Rodney Porter CH FRS FRSE HonFRCP
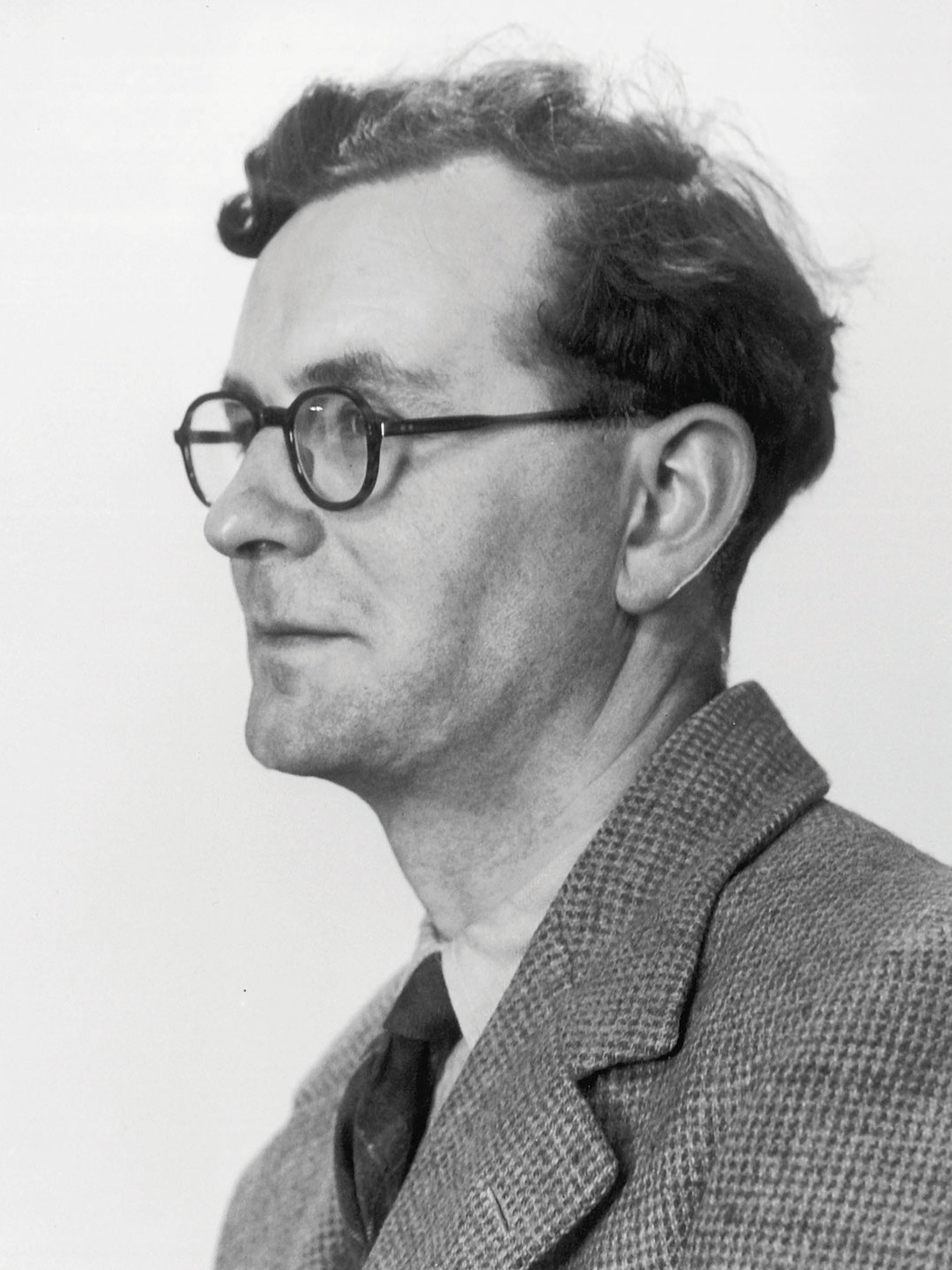
- Born: Rodney Robert Porter; 8 October 1917; Newton-le-Willows, Lancashire, England
- Died: 6 September 1985 (aged 67); Beacon Hill, Surrey, near Guildford
- Education: University of Liverpool (BSc); University of Cambridge (PhD)
- Known for: Chemical structure of antibodies
- Awards: Gairdner Foundation International Award (1966); Nobel Prize in Physiology or Medicine (1972); Royal Medal (1973); Copley Medal (1983)
- Scientific career
- Fields: Biochemistry
- Workplaces: National Institute for Medical Research; Imperial College London; University of Oxford
- Thesis: The free amino groups of proteins (1948)
- Doctoral advisor: Frederick Sanger

Rodney Robert Porter (8 October 1917 – 6 September 1985) was a British biochemist and Nobel laureate.

== Education and early life ==
He was born in Newton-le-Willows, Lancashire, England, the son of Joseph Lawrence Porter, chief clerk of the Railway Carriage and Wagon Works in Earlestown (Newton-le-Willows), and his wife, Isabel May Reese. He was educated at Ashton-in-Makerfield Grammar School.

Rodney Robert Porter received his Bachelor of Science degree from the University of Liverpool in 1939 for Biochemistry.

His career was interrupted by World War II during which he served as a 2nd Lieutenant in the Royal Engineers serving in Sicily and North Africa. In 1944 he was promoted to Major and transferred to the Royal Army Service Corps acting as a War Department analyst, based in Naples in Italy.

After the war he moved to the University of Cambridge where he became Fred Sanger's first PhD student. He was awarded his doctorate (PhD) in 1948.

== Career and research ==
Porter worked for the National Institute for Medical Research for eleven years (1949–1960) before joining St. Mary's Hospital Medical School, Imperial College London and becoming the Pfizer Professor of Immunology. In 1967 he was appointed Whitley Professor of Biochemistry at the University of Oxford, and Fellow of Trinity College, Oxford. His colleague Elizabeth Press (Betty Press) worked with him at NIMR, St Mary's and at Oxford contributing extensively to the work which led to the Nobel Prize.

== Awards and honours ==
Porter was elected a Fellow of the Royal Society (FRS) in 1964. He won the Gairdner Foundation International Award in 1966. In 1972, Porter shared the Nobel Prize in Physiology or Medicine with Gerald M. Edelman for determining the chemical structure of an antibody. Using the enzyme papain, he broke the blood's immunoglobin into fragments, making them easier to study. He also looked into how the blood's immunoglobins react with cellular surfaces. He subsequently worked with colleagues Kenneth BM Reid, Robert Sim and Duncan Campbell on developing understanding of the Complement Proteins associated with defence against infection.

In 1991, Raymond Dwek founded the Oxford Glycobiology Institute at the Department of Biochemistry, University of Oxford and this building was named after Porter as the Rodney Porter building. The department organises the Rodney Porter Memorial Lecture every year.

== Family ==
In 1948 he married Julia New. They had five children together. She died in 2025 at the age of 98.

== Death ==
Porter died following a four-car accident on 6 September 1985, near Beacon Hill, Surrey, near Hindhead, as the driver of one of the cars. Julia was only slightly injured in the accident. They had been en route to France for a holiday, just prior to his formal retirement.
