= Whitley Professor of Biochemistry =

Position at the University of Oxford

The position of Whitley Professor of Biochemistry at the University of Oxford is one of the permanent chairs of the university, and the first in the field of biochemistry at the university. It is associated with a fellowship at Trinity College, Oxford, and was established with an endowment of £10,000 by Edward Whitley of Trinity College. Benjamin Moore was nominated by Whitley, a former student of Moore, as the first professor. Since its creation, the position has been held by:

- Benjamin Moore 1920–22
- Sir Rudolph Peters 1923–54
- Sir Hans Adolf Krebs 1954–67
- Rodney Robert Porter 1967–85
- Sir Edwin Southern 1985–2005
- Kim Nasmyth 2006-2022
- Dame Amanda Fisher 2023 onwards
